= Tam Kung =

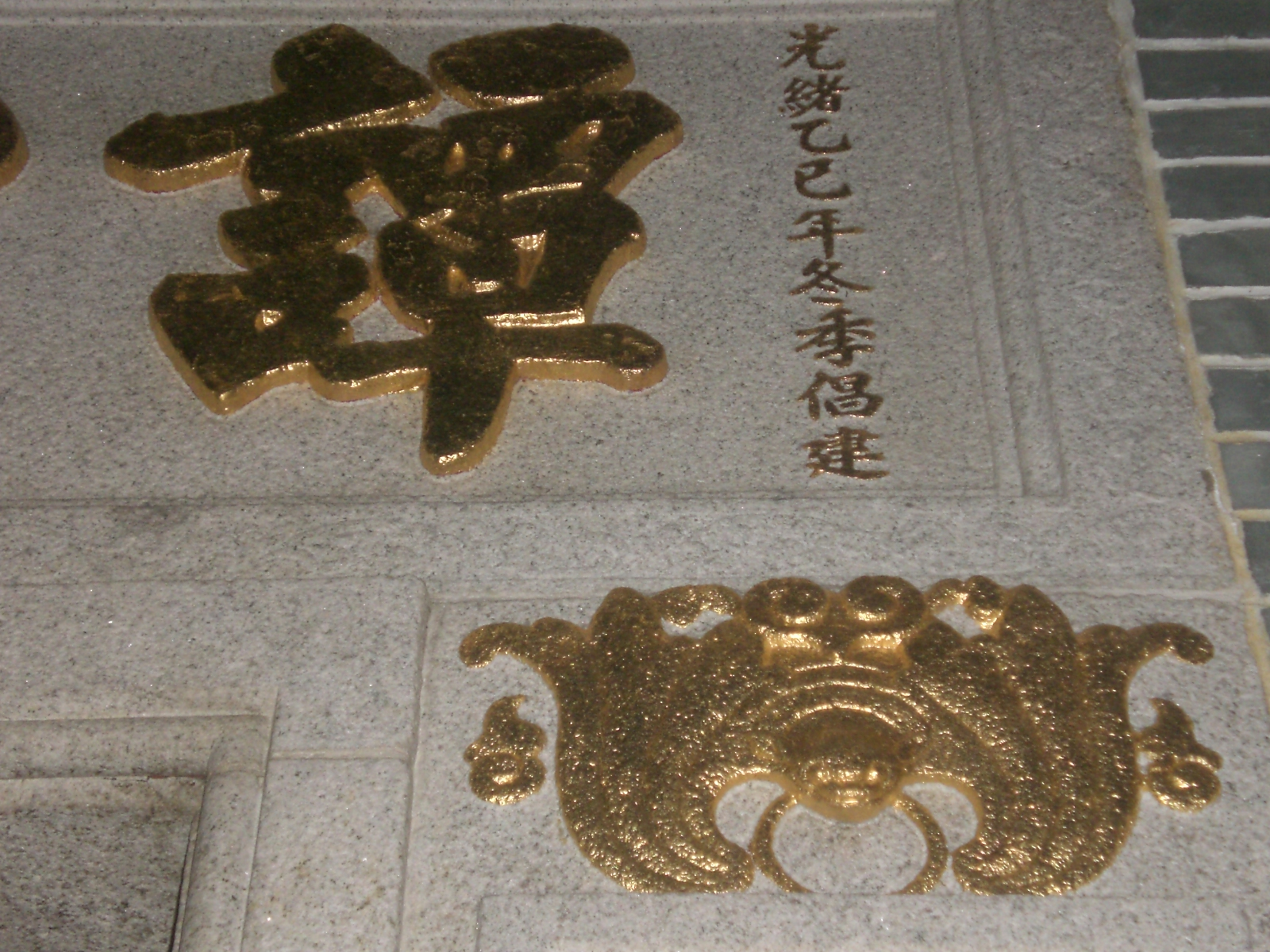
The Tam (譚) character at the entrance of the Shau Kei Wan Tam Kung Temple.

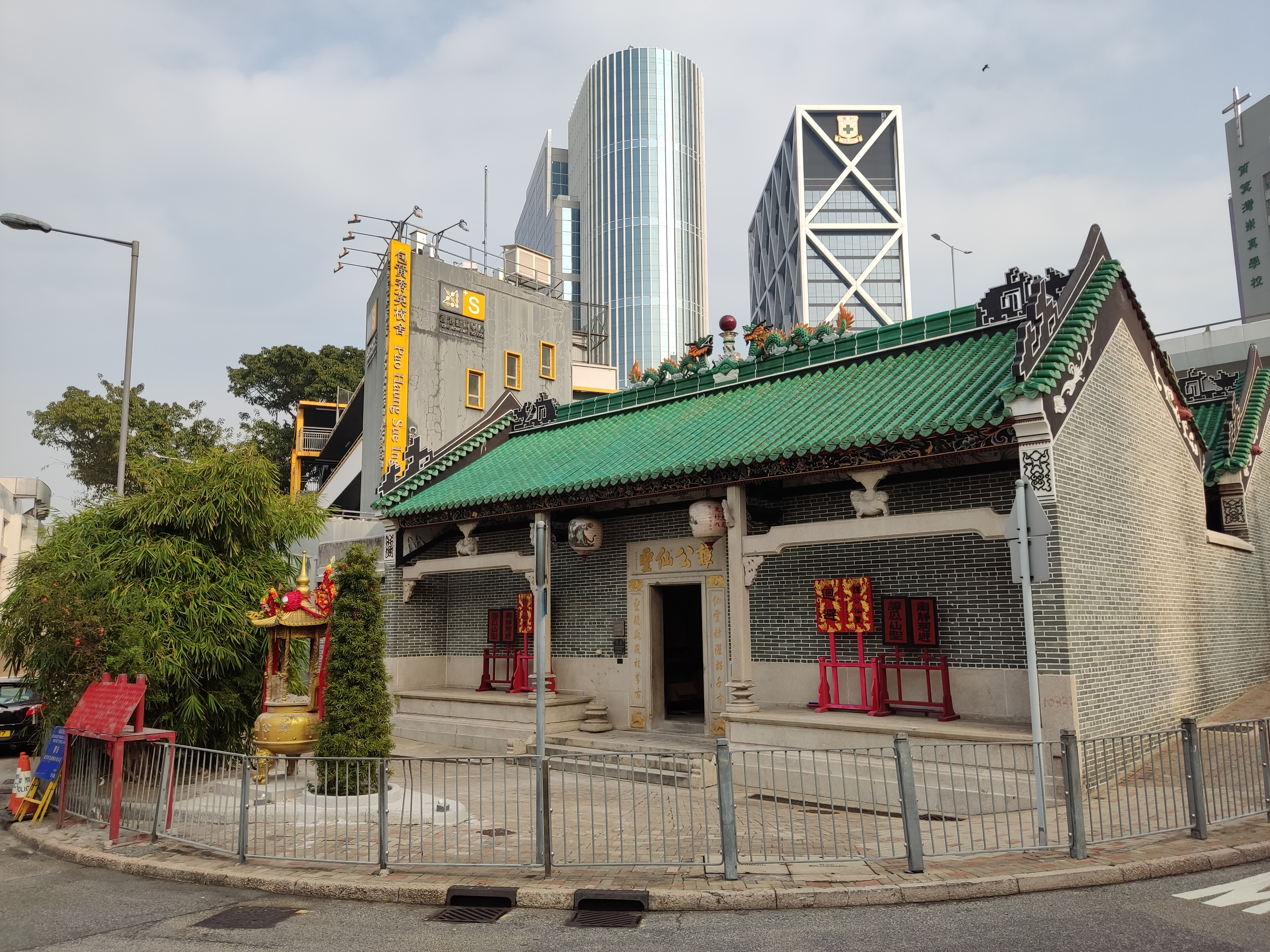
Tam Kung Temple in Shau Kei Wan, Hong Kong.

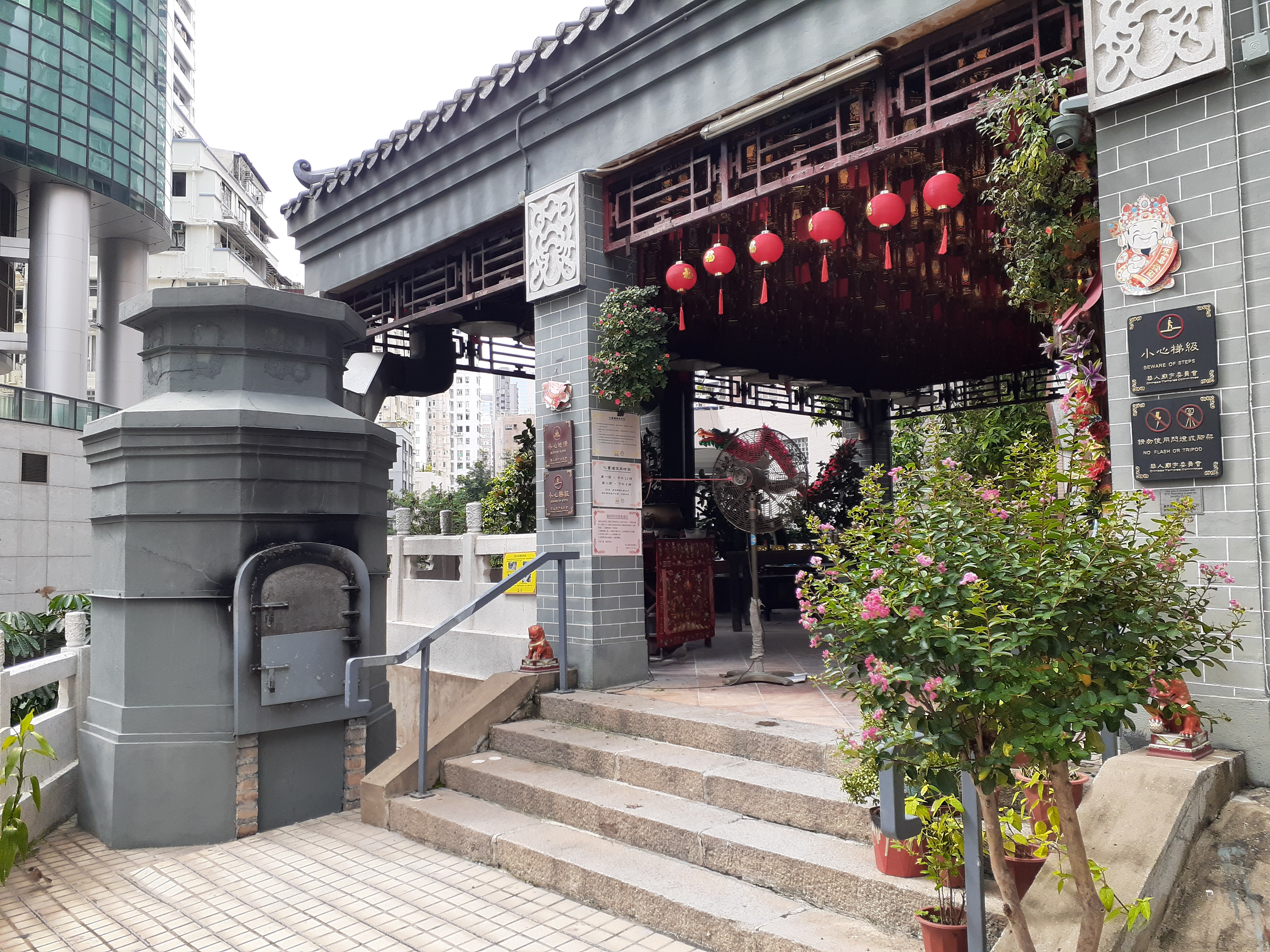
Tam Kung Temple in Happy Valley, Hong Kong.

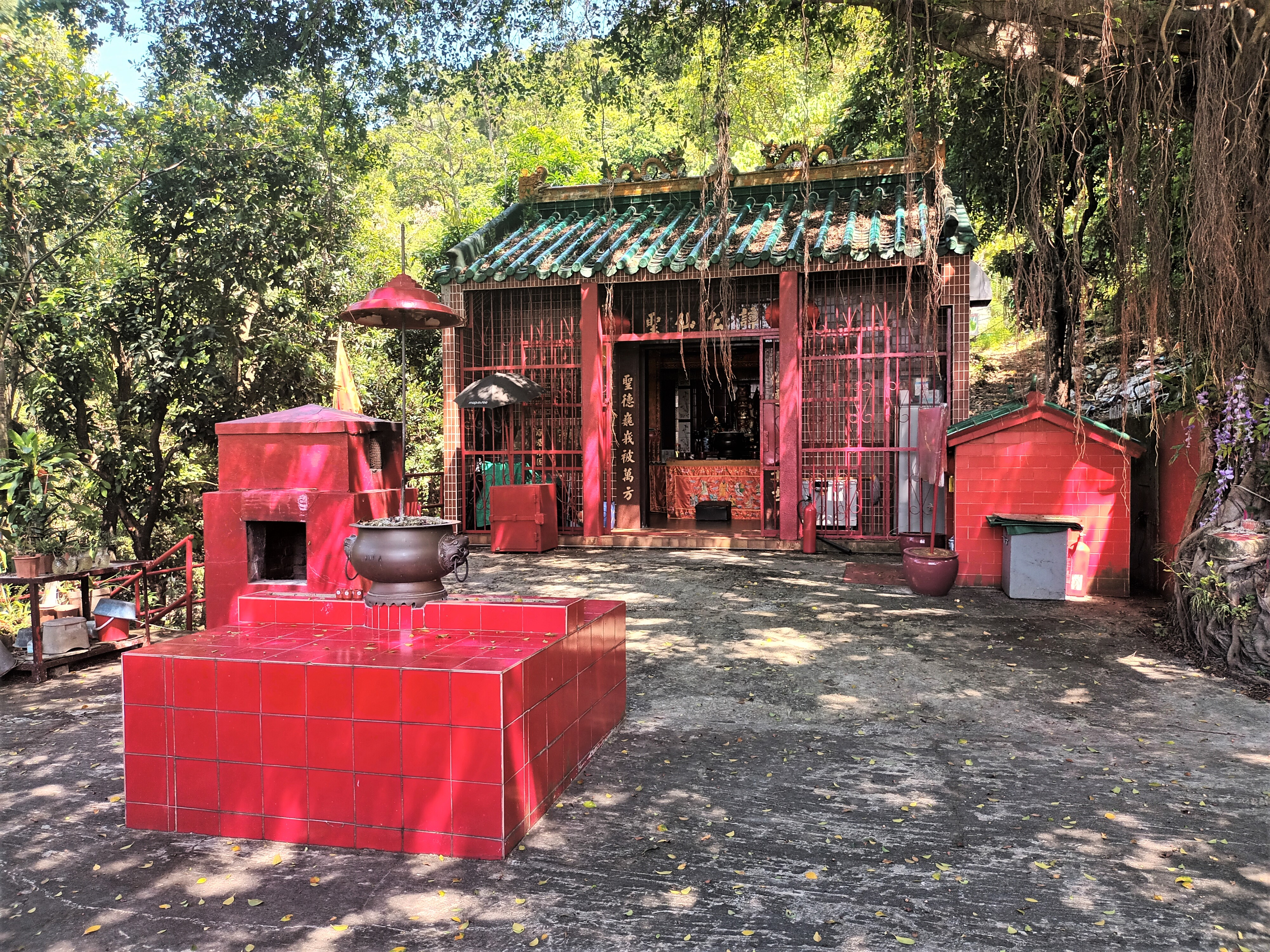
Tam Kung Yea Temple, off Shek Pai Wan Road, in Tin Wan, Southern District, Hong Kong.

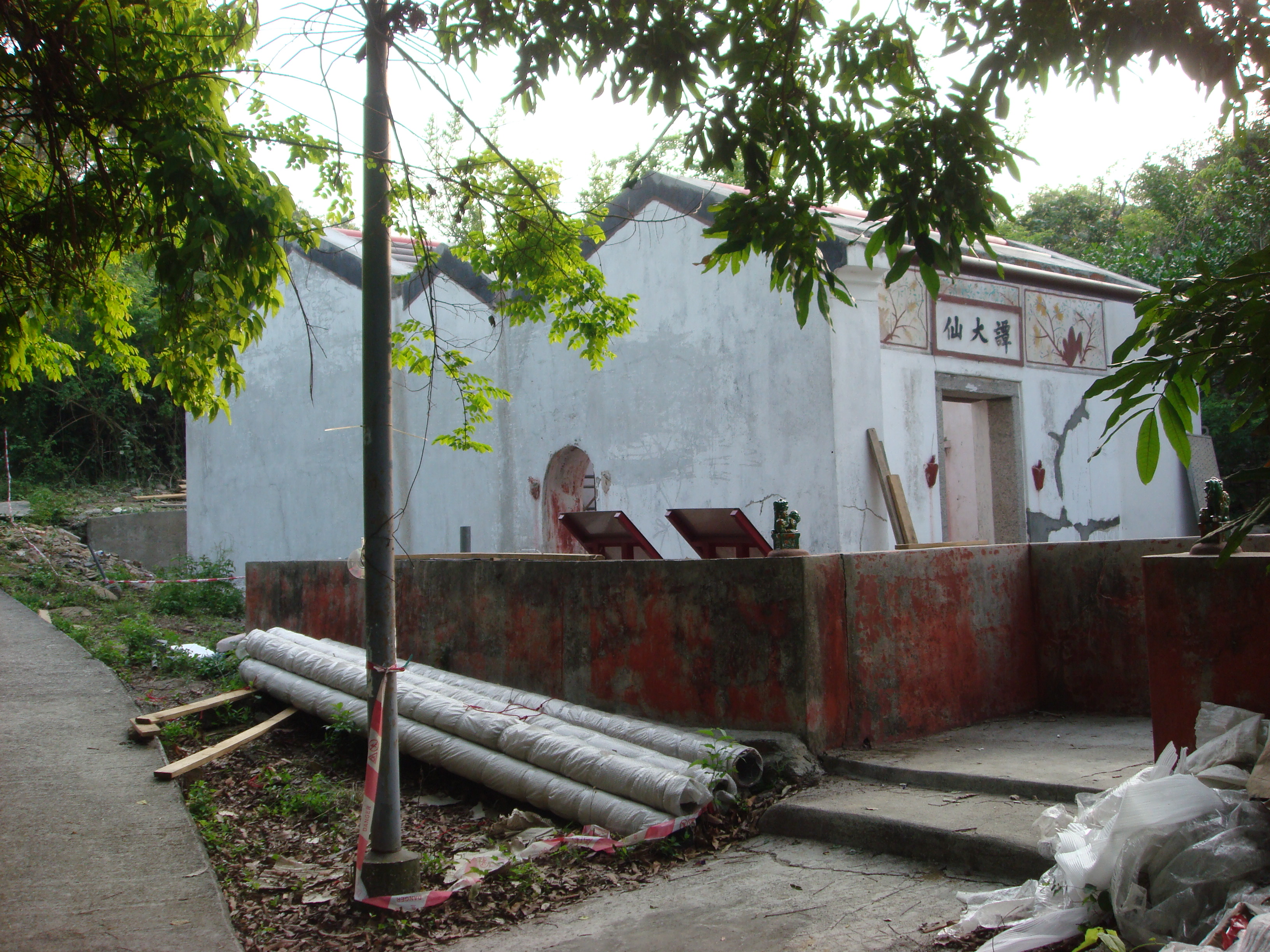
Tam Kung Temple in Ping Chau.

Tam Kung (Chinese: 譚公; lit. 'Lord Tam') or Tam Tai Sin (譚大仙) is a sea deity worshiped in Hong Kong and Macau.

In Chinese folk legends, Tam Kung was one of gods who could forecast the weather. He was born in Huizhou Prefecture. It was said that he could cure patients in his childhood. Tam Kung became an immortal in heaven at the age of twenty in the Nine-dragon Mountain in Huizhou. He was officially deified during the Qing dynasty. People whose ancestral home are in Huizhou or Chaoshan of Guangdong province worship Tam Kung most sincerely.

== Temples in Hong Kong ==
=== Shau Kei Wan ===
The Tam Kung Sin Shing Temple (譚公仙聖廟) is located along Tam Kung Temple Road, at the northern end of Shau Kei Wan Main Street East, in A Kung Ngam, Shau Kei Wan. It was originally a small shrine. Local people raised money to construct it in 1905 and reconstructed it many times afterwards.

The statue of Tam Kung, which was first worshipped among the other gods in the temple, was formerly positioned in the Tam Kung Temple in Tam Kung Road (譚公道) in Kowloon City. There is a big rock in front of the temple and is believed to be Tam Kung's magic stamp. Local residents and fishermen are the sincere worshippers. On the birthday of Tam Kung (8th day of the 4th month in Chinese calendar), they will have a celebration and play a so-called "kung fu" show which is a major part of the celebration. A parade and dragon dance are also held on this occasion.

The temple has been managed by the Chinese Temples Committee since 1928. The temple is a former Grade I historic building. It is a Grade III historic building since April 2013.

=== Happy Valley ===
A Tam Kung Temple is located on a small hill at No.9 Blue Pool Road, Happy Valley, at the intersection with Ventris Road. This temple was built in 1901 after the previous one located on a slope near the Hong Kong Sanatorium and Hospital in Happy Valley, in the former Wong Nai Chung Village, was demolished during urban development. According to a story, Tam Kung appeared to a young boy in a dream and guided him to the present site, which was regarded as selected by the deity for the new location of the temple. A Tin Hau Temple, also relocated in 1901, is situated at the back of this temple. The temples have been managed by the Chinese Temples Committee since 1929.

=== Southern District ===
The Tam Kung Yea Temple (香港仔譚公廟) is located off Shek Pai Wan Road, in Tin Wan, Southern District.

=== Ping Chau ===
The Tam Tai Sin Temple (譚大仙廟), in Sha Tau, Tung Ping Chau was built around 1877. Many early residents of Tung Ping Chau were from Shantou and they kept the tradition of worshipping Tam Kung after they settled on the island. The Temple celebrates the Tam Kung Festival on the 8th day of the fourth Lunar month.

== Other places ==
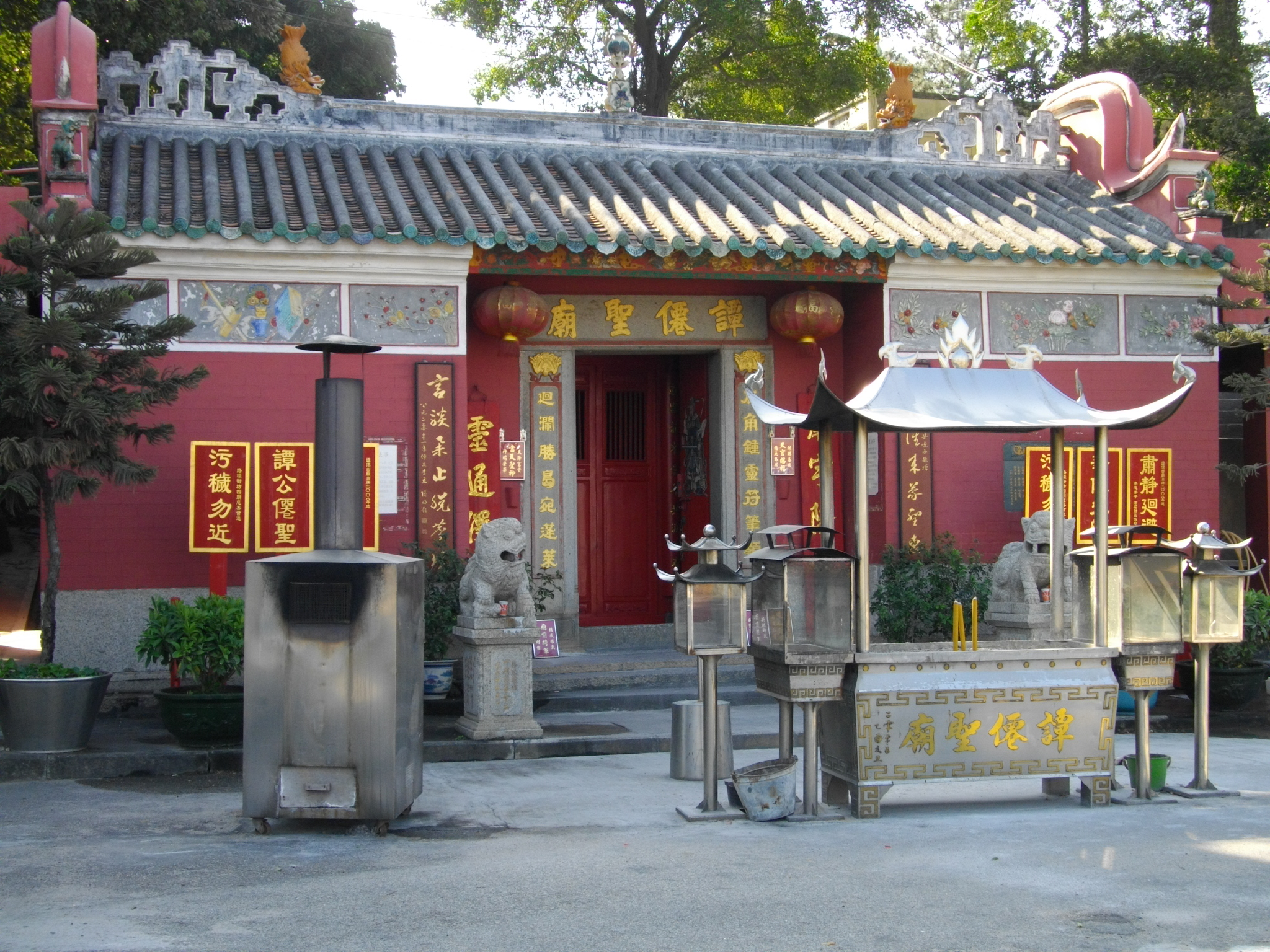
Tam Kung Temple, in Coloane, Macau

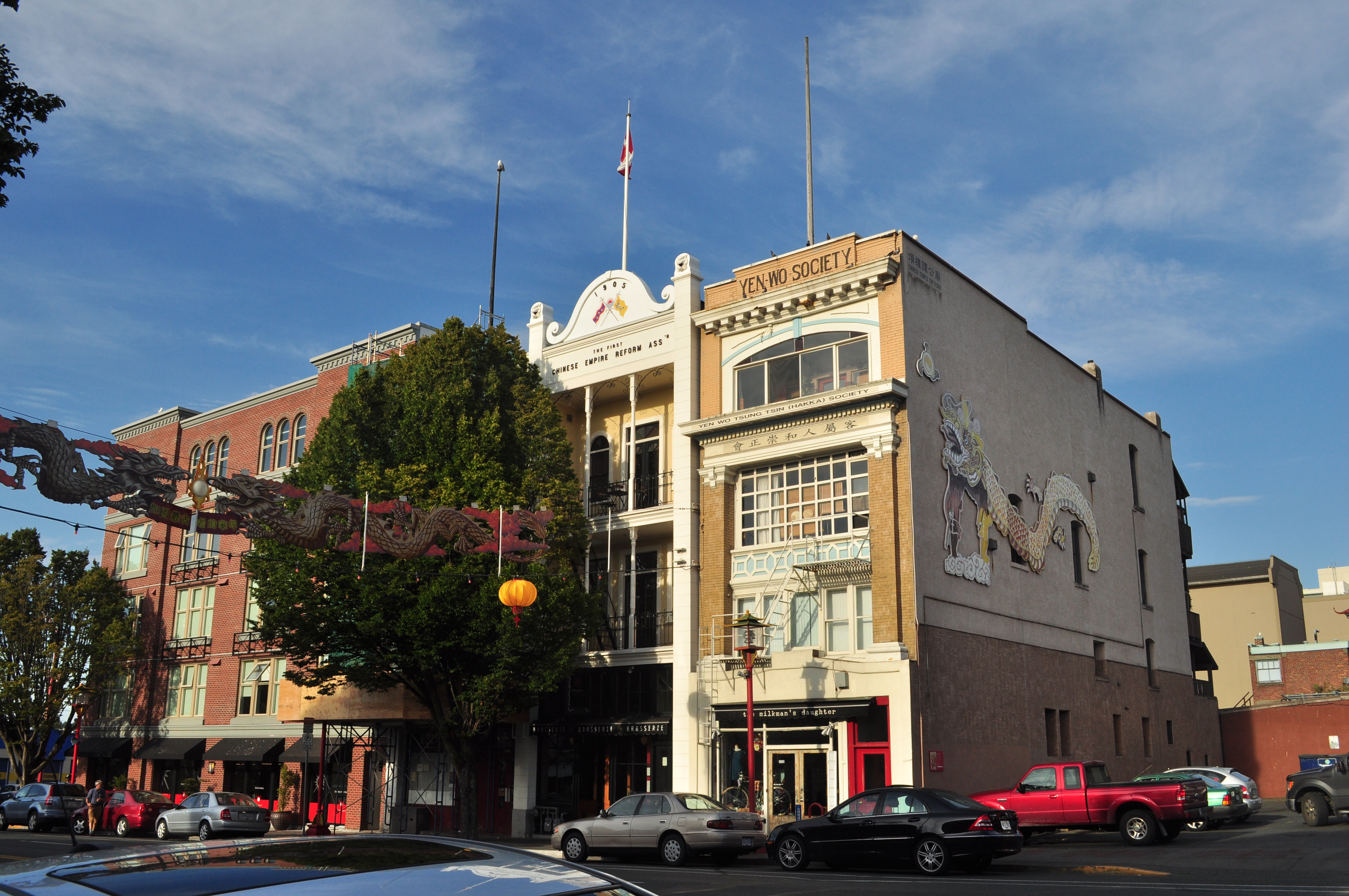
Tam Kung Temple in Victoria, British Columbia, Canada

=== Macau ===
There is also a Tam Kung Temple at Rua de Cinco de Outubro in Coloane, Macau. It was built in 1862.

=== Canada ===
In Victoria, BC, Canada, there is also a temple to the deity, Tam Kung. The temple was erected in 1876. At 1713 Government Street is a tall, slim building established by the Yen Wo Society. Fifty-two steps up to the top floor is the oldest Chinese Temple in Canada. The statue there was originally kept in a wooden box at Market Square, and it was moved to the temple by its keeper after Tam Kung appeared to him in a dream. Visitors are welcome most days from 10 to 4, and visitors can make donations for good health and the upkeep of the shrine.

=== Malaysia ===
There are several Tam Kung temples in Malaysia and these temples were mainly established by the Hakka community in Malaysia. One of the prominent temples is Tam Kung Temple, which is located at Mile 1.5 of North Road in Sandakan, Sabah, Malaysia. The temple was established in 1894 by Hakka immigrants in Sandakan.

== See also ==
- Tin Hau and Tin Hau temples in Hong Kong
- Hung Shing and Hung Shing Temple
- Kwan Tai temples in Hong Kong
- Hip Tin temples in Hong Kong
- Places of worship in Hong Kong
