= 1910 Coloane incident =

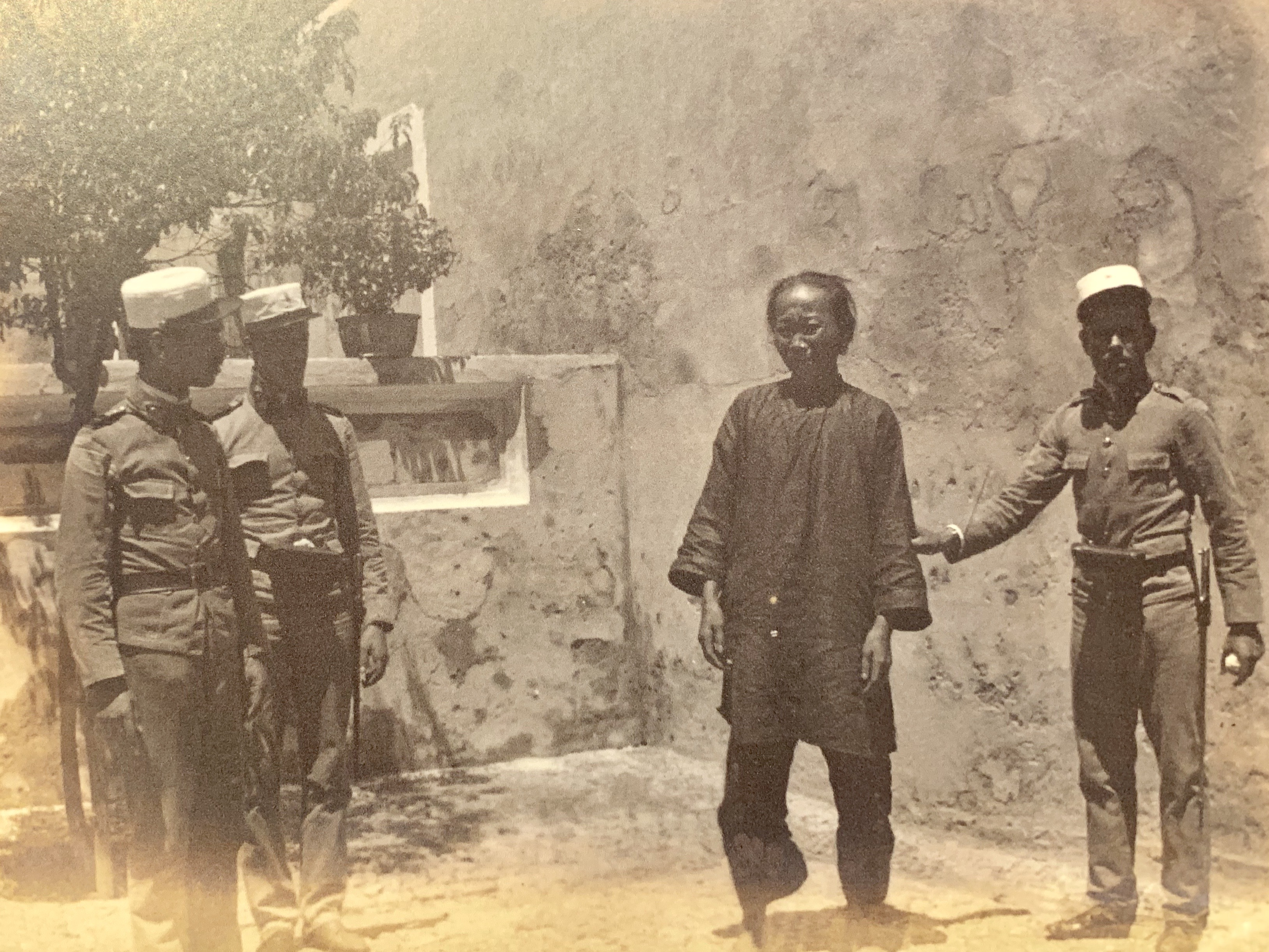
- Capturing of a female pirate during the 1910 Coloane incident
Date	June-August 1910
Location	Macau, Portugal
Result	Portuguese victory
Territorial changes	Annexation of Coloane by Portugal

Belligerents
Kingdom of Portugal	Chinese pirate gangs

Commanders and leaders
Eduardo Marques	Unknown

Strength
245 soldiers 2 ships	Unknown

Casualties and losses
2 dead 3 wounded	Several hundred dead 63 captured

The 1910 Coloane incident was a military conflict between Portuguese forces stationed in Macau and local pirate gangs based on Coloane island. The incident took place in mid-June 1910 when pirates belonging to the Society of Perfect Justice (Ang Ngui T’ong) abducted 17 school children and dozens of other civilians for a $35,000 ransom on the island of Coloane. Portuguese Governor Eduardo Marques reacted quickly to the requests for intervention and declared martial law on Taipa and Coloane on July 12.

An initial Portuguese landing on the same day was repelled when 45 soldiers were ambushed in the nearby hills, resulting in the death of one Portuguese soldier, António Maria d'Oliveira Leite. The next day, around 200 Portuguese soldiers and police, supported by artillery and the gunship Macau, landed at the island. The gunship bombarded Coloane village and the nearby fishing boats, which triggered resistance from the locals and pirates. In the end, three suspected pirates were captured and 60 surrendered, with several hundred Chinese dead.

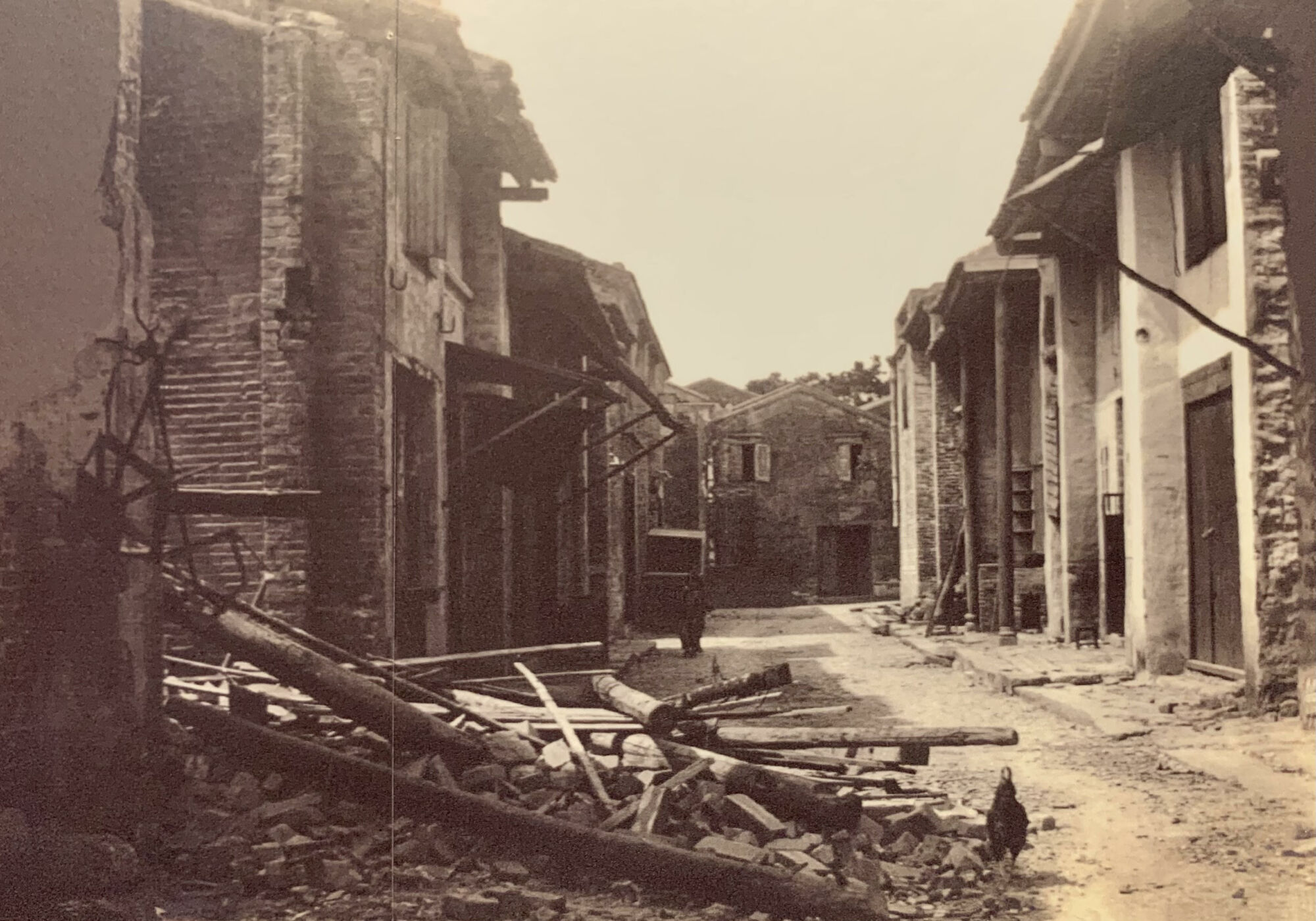
Coloane after the bombing

On July 14, the gunship Pátria and the cruiser Dom Amélia were deployed. Nine to eleven Chinese warships under Wu King Yung also offered assistance to the Portuguese, who declined. For the remainder of the month and into the first days of August, more than 200 Portuguese personnel, supported by the navy, conducted mopping-up operations and bombardments against suspected pirate hideouts.

By that time, the hostages had been rescued, and over 60 suspected pirates had been captured, with many escaping during a storm. The Portuguese suffered a total of two dead and three wounded. The incident allowed Portugal to incorporate Coloane into its Macau enclave despite protests from the Qing dynasty. A stone monument was later erected in St. Francis Xavier Square to commemorate the Portuguese victory.

== Bibliography ==
- Antony, Robert J. (June 2017). "We are Not Pirates: Portugal, China, and the Pirates of Coloane (Macao), 1910". Journal of World History. 28 (2). University of Hawai'i Press. doi:10.1353/jwh.2017.0020.
