= Tam Kung Temple (Macau) =

Temple in Coloane, Macau, China

- 譚公廟
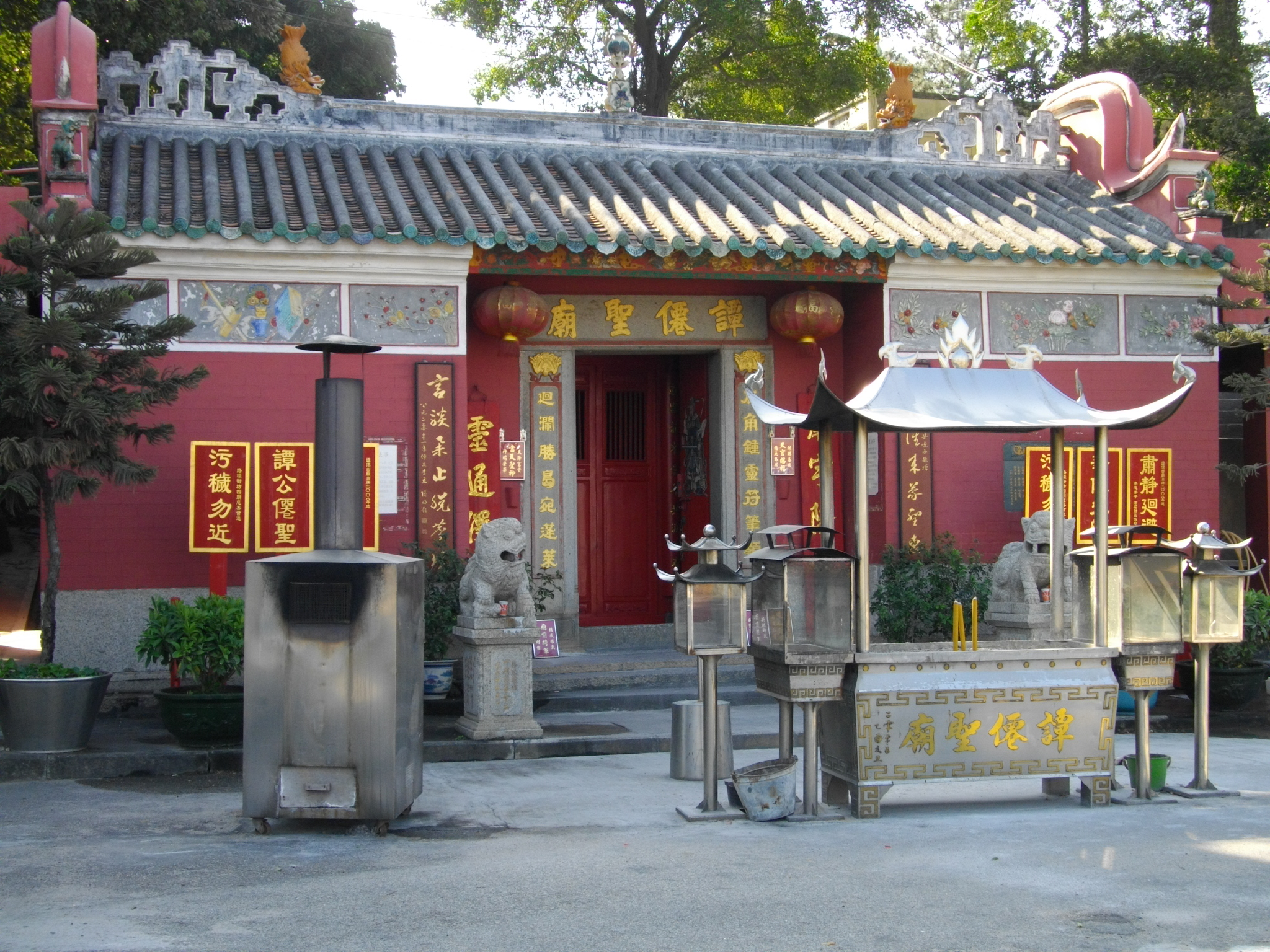

- Location within Macau

Location
- Location: Coloane, Macau, China
- Interactive map of Tam Kung Temple
- Coordinates: 22°6′51″N 113°33′0.4″E

Architecture
- Type: temple
- Completed: 1862

Tam Kung Temple
- Traditional Chinese: 譚公廟
- Simplified Chinese: 谭公庙
Transcriptions
Standard Mandarin
- Hanyu Pinyin: Tángōngmiào
Yue: Cantonese
- Jyutping: taam4 gung1 miu6

The Tam Kung Temple (Chinese: 譚公廟; Portuguese: Templo de Tam Kung) is a temple in Coloane, Macau, China. It is dedicated to Tam Kung.

== History ==
The temple was constructed in 1862 during the Portuguese Macau.

== Architecture ==
There is a long whale bone with the shape of dragon boat inside the temple main altar. There is also a bronze spouting bowl in the hall.

== See also ==
- Tam Kung
- A-Ma Temple, built in 1488
- Kun Iam Temple, built in 1627
- Na Tcha Temple, built in 1888
- Sam Kai Vui Kun
- Tam Kung Temple, located at Mile 1.5 of North Road in Sandakan, Sabah, Malaysia
- List of tourist attractions in Macau
