= A-Ma Temple =

Historic temple in São Lourenço, Macau

Coordinates: 22°11′10″N 113°31′52.10″E

A-Má Temple
- 媽閣廟
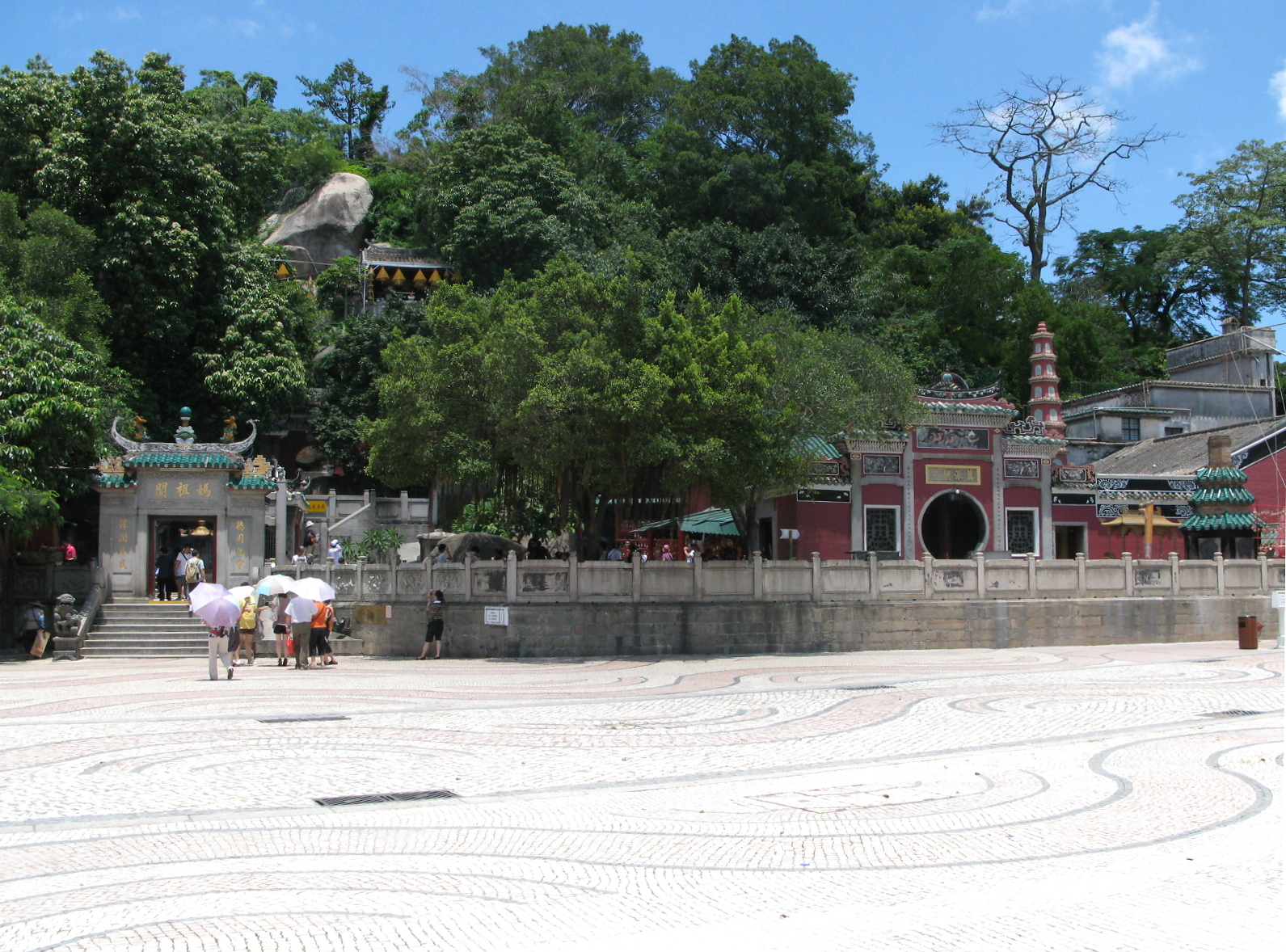
- A-Má Temple, Macau
- Interactive map of the A-Má Temple area

General information
- Location: Barra, Macau, Macau, Macau
- Completed: 1488

A-Ma Temple
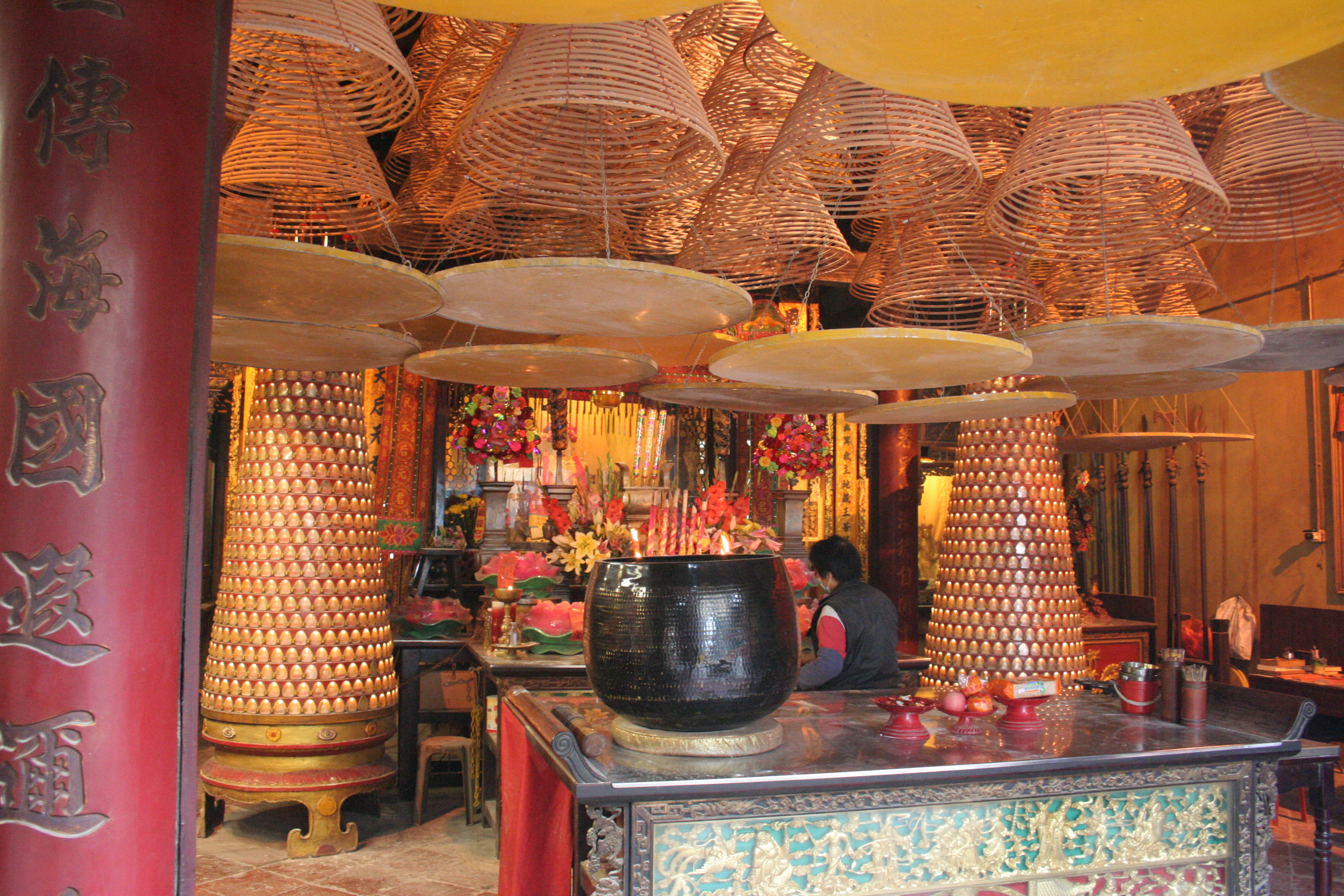
- Main Hall

Chinese name
- Traditional Chinese: 媽閣廟
- Simplified Chinese: 妈阁庙
- Literal meaning: Temple of the Pavilion of the Mother
Transcriptions
Standard Mandarin
- Hanyu Pinyin: Mā Gé Miào
Yue: Cantonese
- Yale Romanization: Mā Gok Miuh
- Jyutping: maa1 gok3 miu6
Southern Min
- Hokkien POJ: Má Koh Biō

Portuguese name
- Portuguese: Templo de A-Má

The A-Má Temple is a temple to the Chinese sea-goddess Mazu located in São Lourenço, Macau, China. Built in 1488, the temple is one of the oldest in Macau and thought to be the settlement's namesake.

== History ==
The name Macau was thought to be derived from the name of the temple. See Hokkien Chinese: 阿媽; Pe̍h-ōe-jī: a-má; lit. 'grandmother', 'elderly woman'; Cantonese Chinese: 阿媽; Jyutping: aa^{3} maa^{5}; Cantonese Yale: a máh; lit. 'an epithet of the Fujianese sea goddess Matsu (媽祖)'. It is said that when the Portuguese sailors landed at the coast just outside the temple and asked the name of the place, the natives replied A-maa-gok (Cantonese Chinese: 阿媽閣; Jyutping: aa^{3} maa^{5} gok^{3}; Cantonese Yale: a máh gok; lit. 'Pavilion of the Fujianese sea goddess Matsu (媽祖)'; Hokkien Chinese: 阿媽閣; Pe̍h-ōe-jī: A-má Koh; lit. 'Ornamental Platform of the Grandmother') or Maa-gok (Cantonese Chinese: 媽閣; Jyutping: maa^{5} gok^{3}; Cantonese Yale: máh gok; lit. 'Pavilion of the Mother'). The Portuguese then named the peninsula with various forms over the centuries such as "Amacão", "Ama Cuão", "amaquan", "Amacao", "Amacuão", "Amaquão", "Amangão", "Amagão", "Amaquam", then the initial ⟨A⟩ was later elided in Portuguese likely due to misconstruing with Portuguese: a, lit. 'towards; to; at; in' resulting into the following forms, "Macão", "Macao", "Macau", "Maquão", "Maçhoam", "Machoam". The temple was well described in ancient Chinese texts as well as represented in paintings, related to Macao. It is also one of the first scenes photographed in Macao.

In 2005, the temple became one of the designated sites of the Historic Centre of Macau, a UNESCO World Heritage Site.

== Architecture ==
The temple consists of six main parts: Gate Pavilion, the Memorial Arch, the Prayer Hall, the Hall of Benevolence (the oldest part of the temple), the Hall of Guanyin, Zhengjiao Chanlin - Buddhist Pavilion.

== Gallery ==
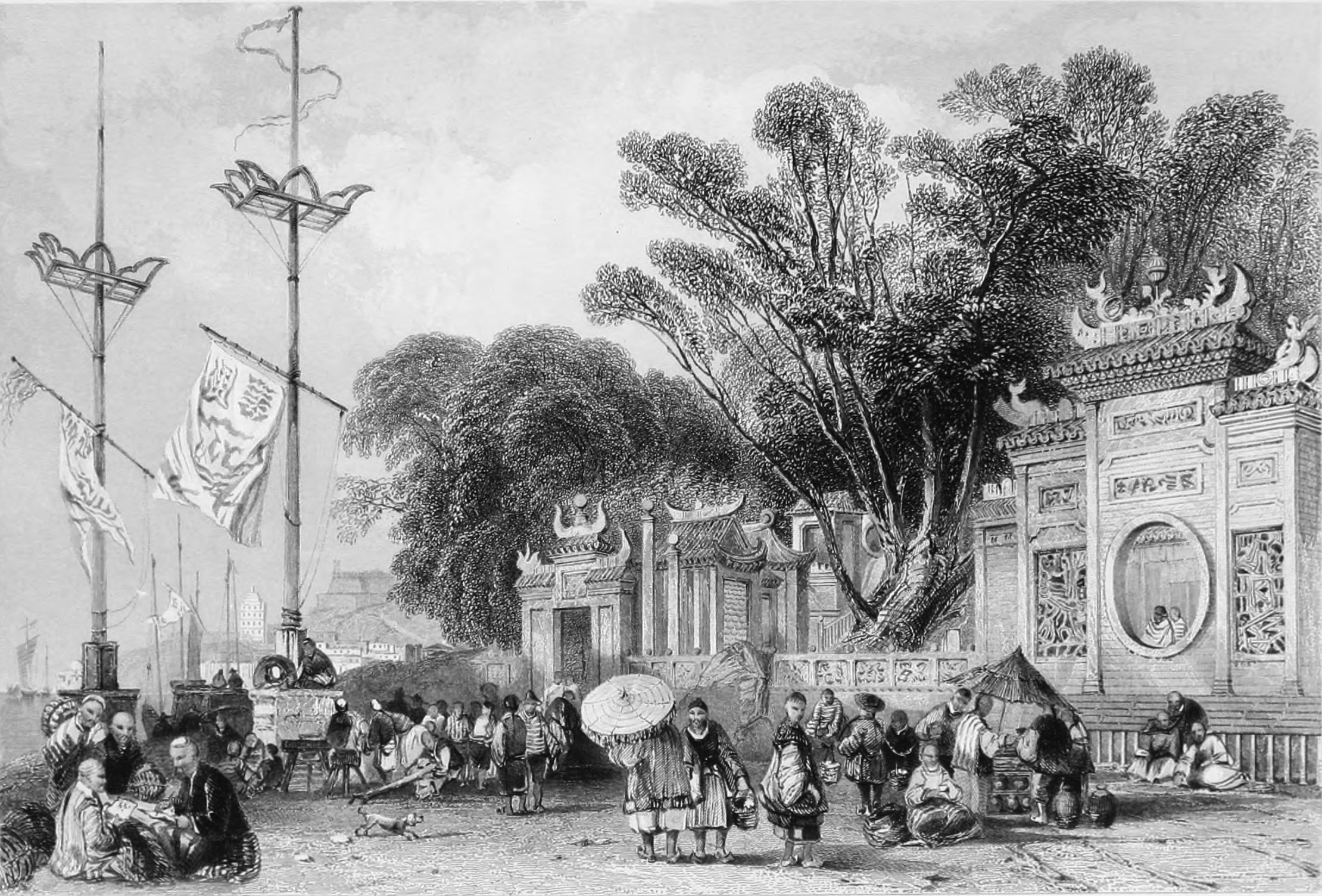
A 19th-century painting of the facade of A-Ma Temple by English architect and artist Thomas Allom

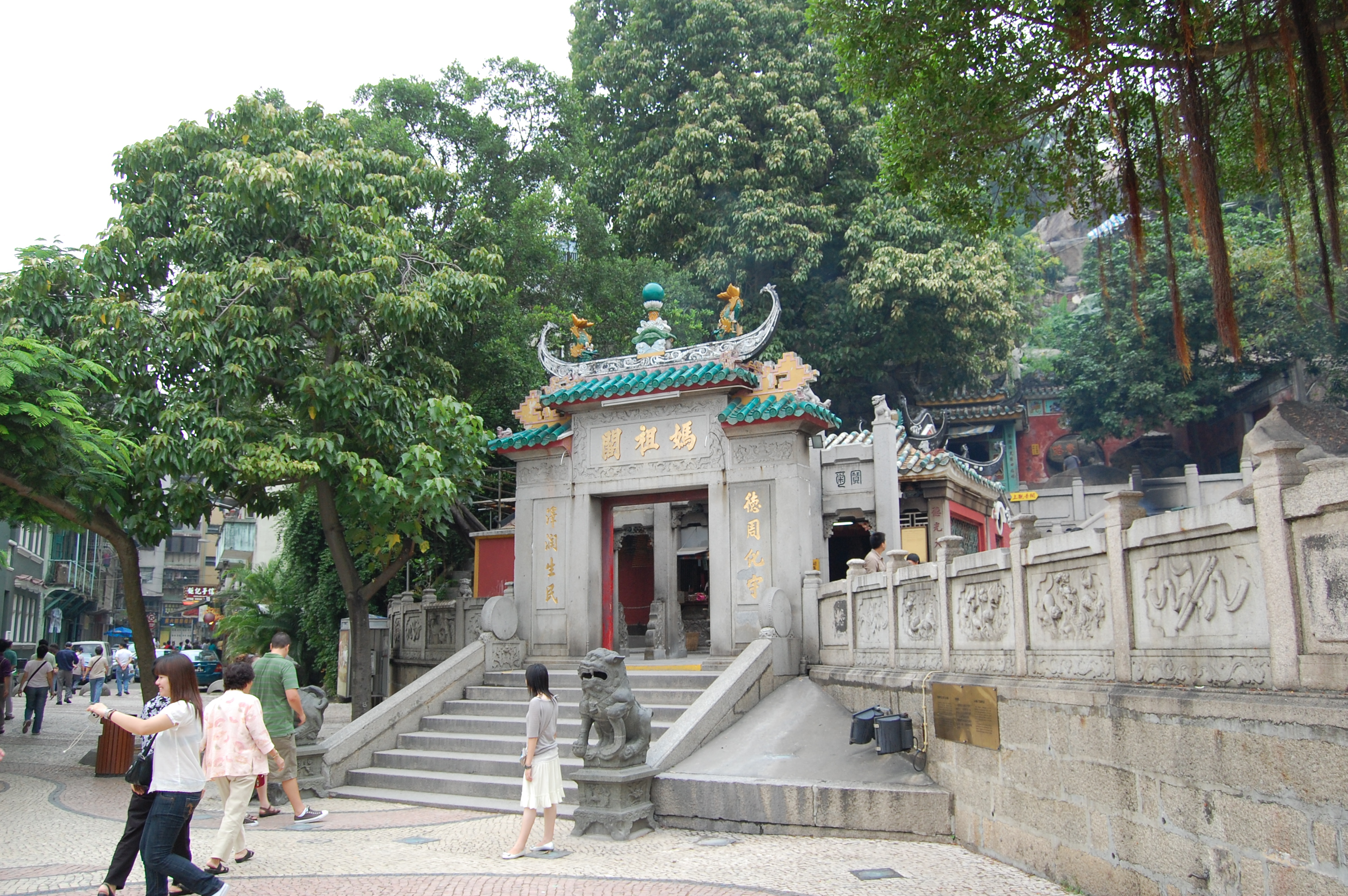
Main entrance of A-Ma Temple

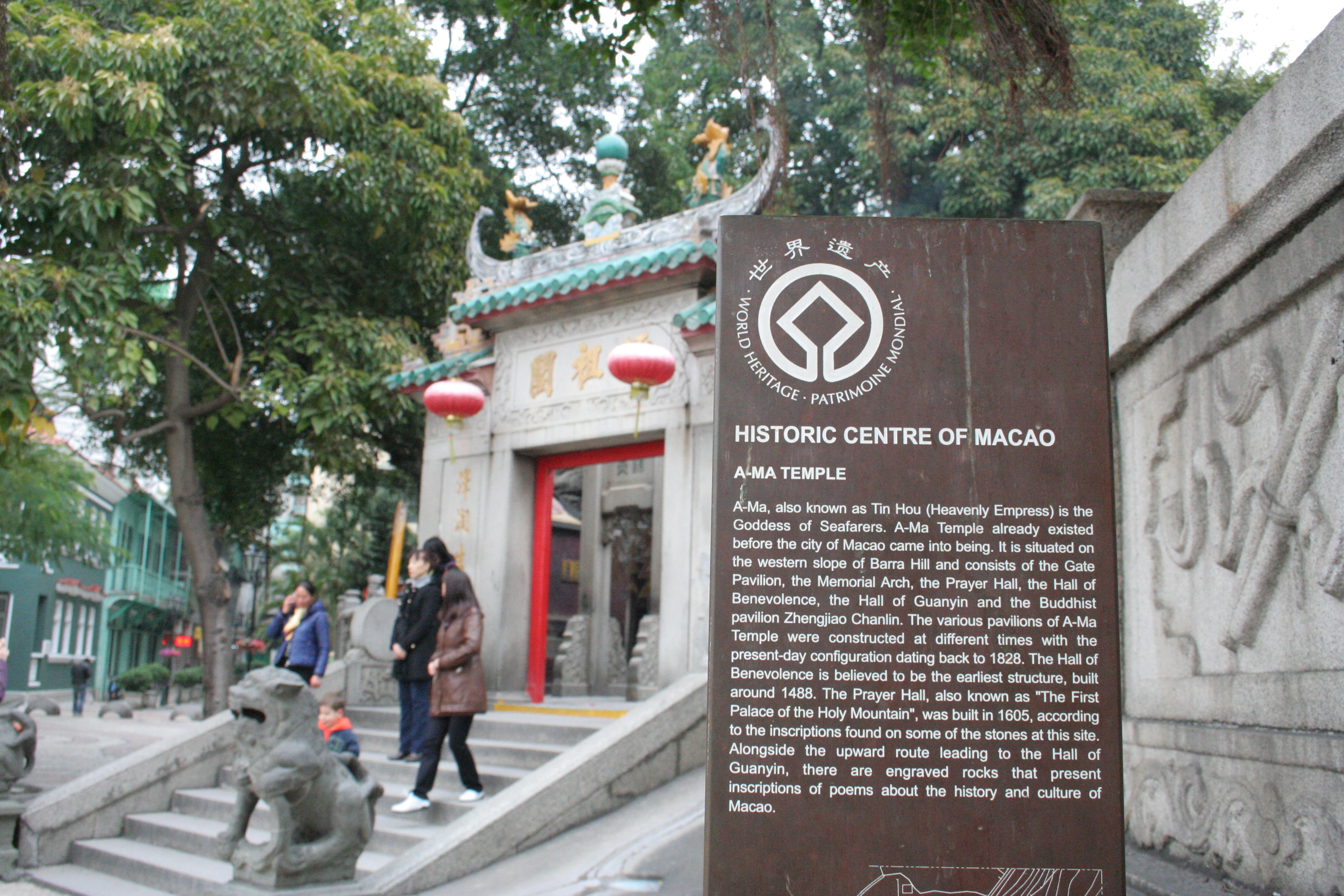
World Heritage marker

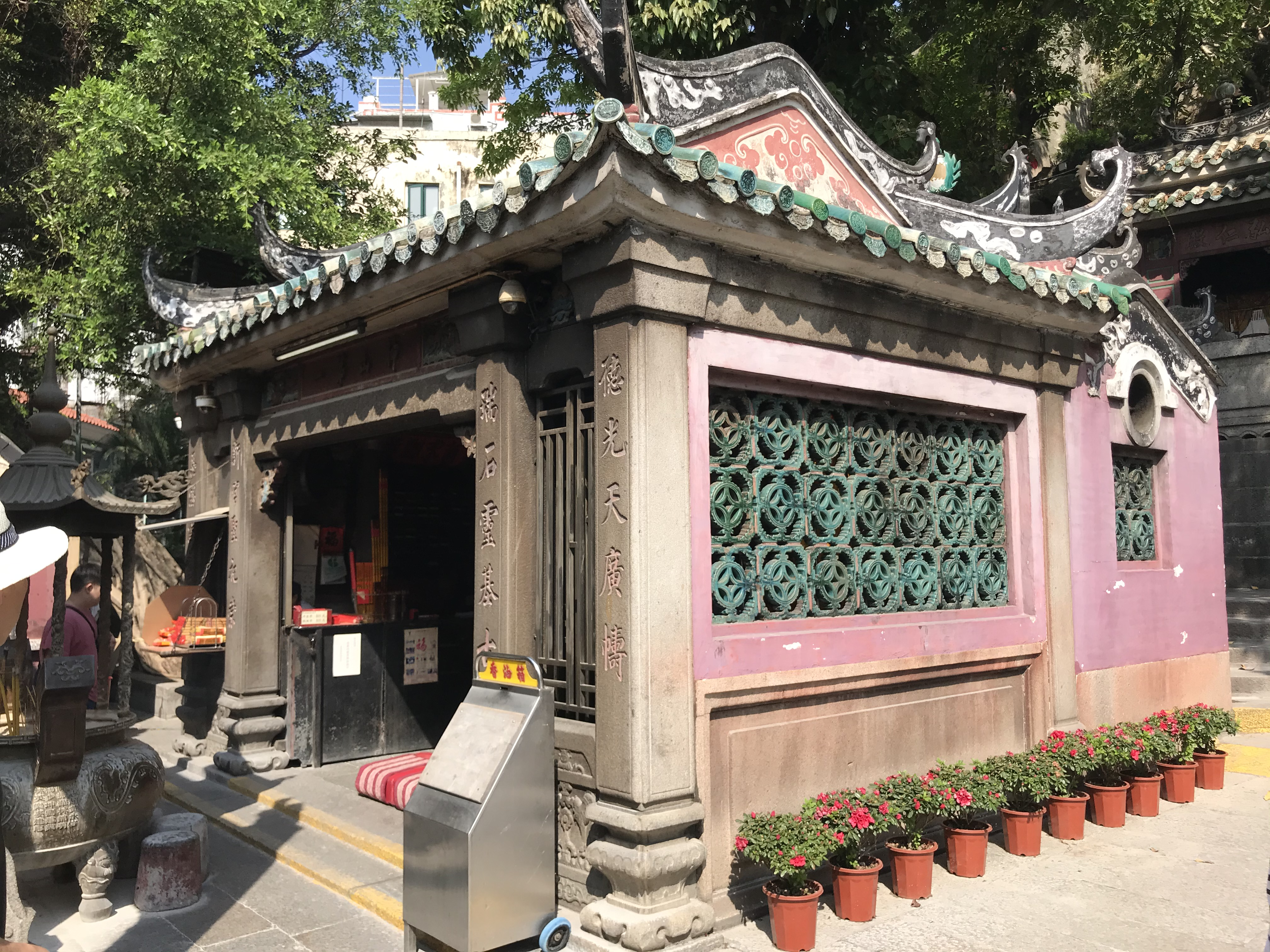
Prayer Hall

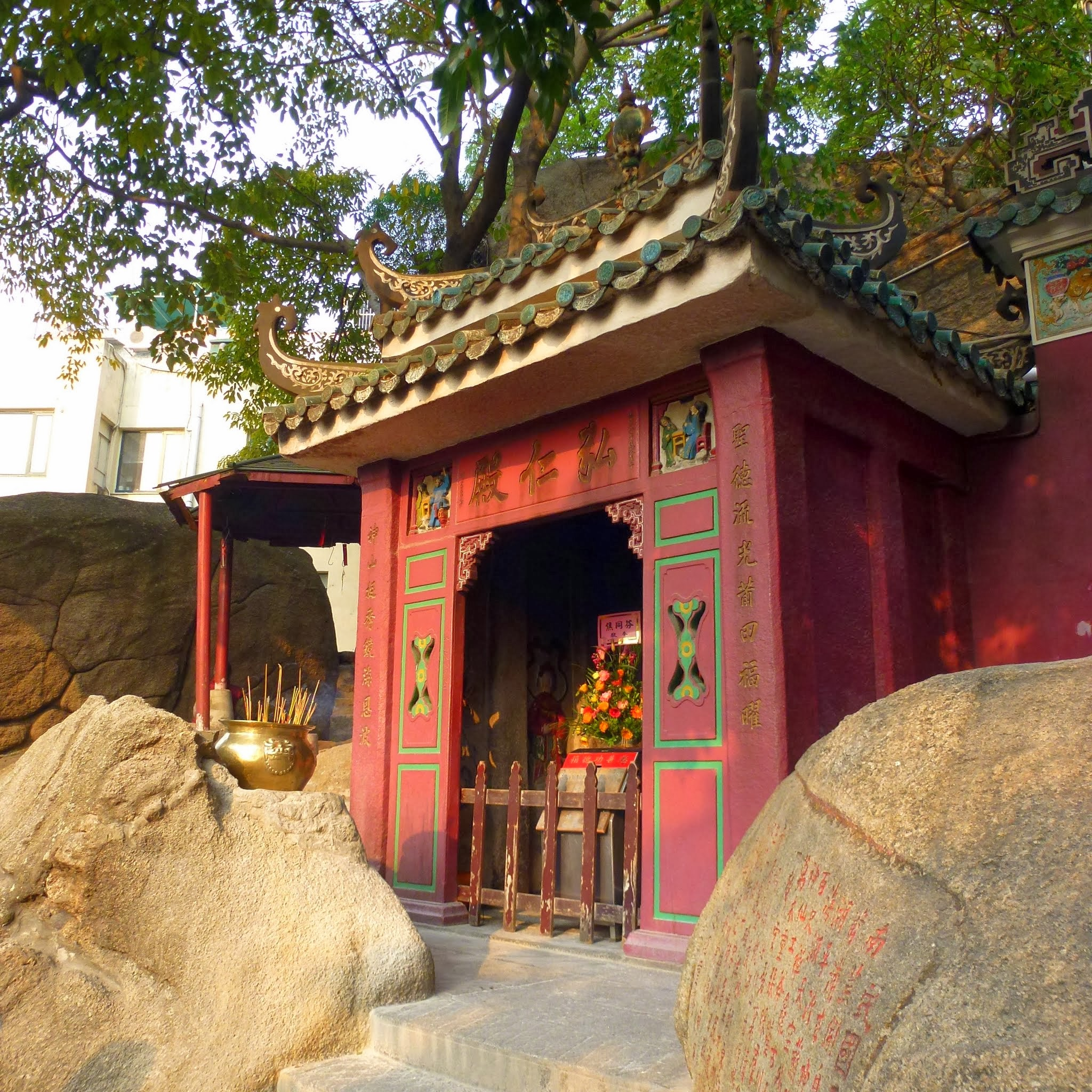
Hall of Benevolence

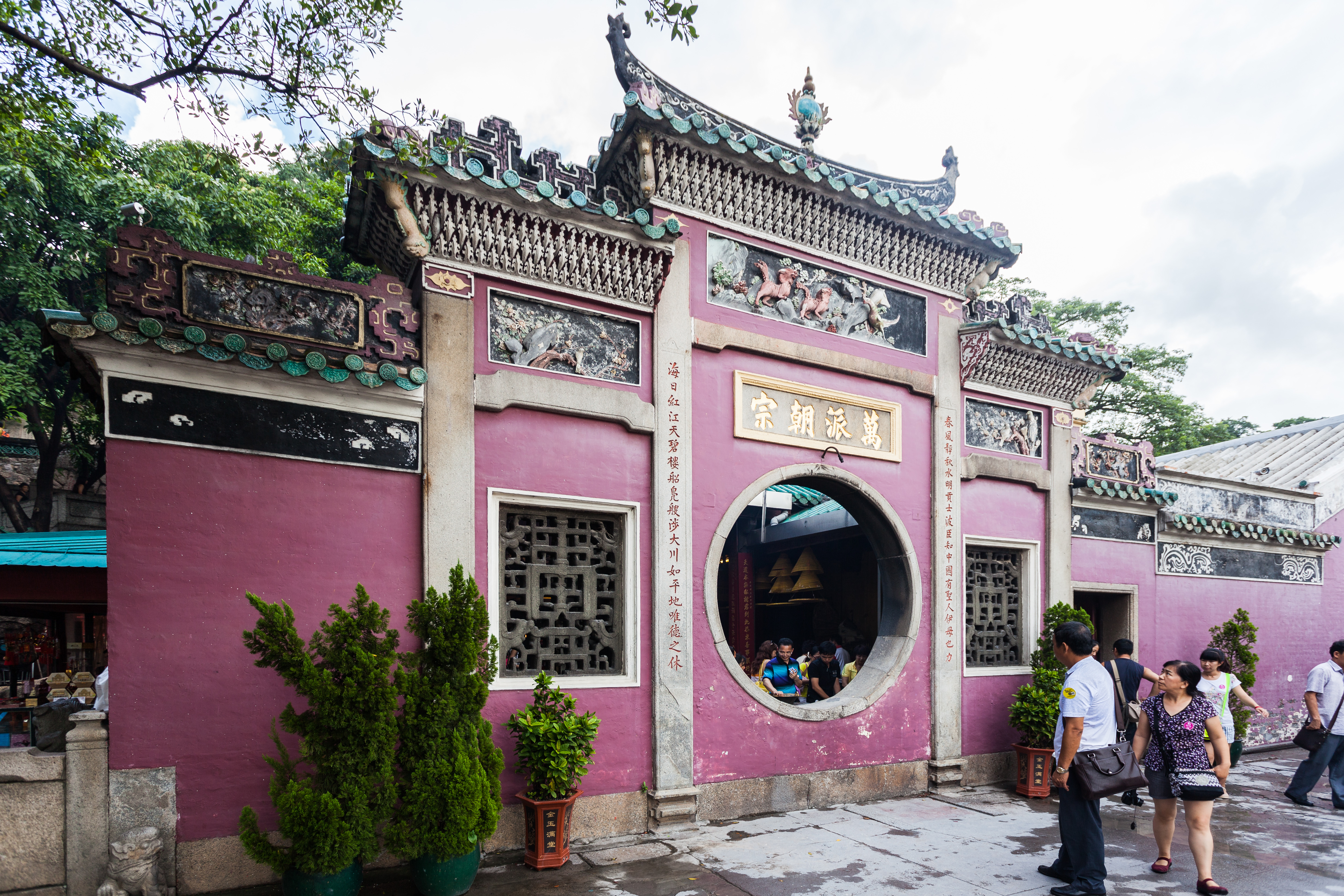
Zhengjiao Chanlin Buddhist Temple

== See also ==
- Kun Iam Temple, built in 1627
- Tam Kung Temple (Macau), built in 1862
- Na Tcha Temple, built in 1888
- Sam Kai Vui Kun
- Tin Hau temples in Hong Kong
- Qianliyan & Shunfeng'er
- Religion in Macau
- List of historic buildings and structures in Macau
