= Sam Kai Vui Kun =

Chinese temple in Macau

Coordinates: 22°11′38.4″N 113°32′21.6″E

- 三街會館
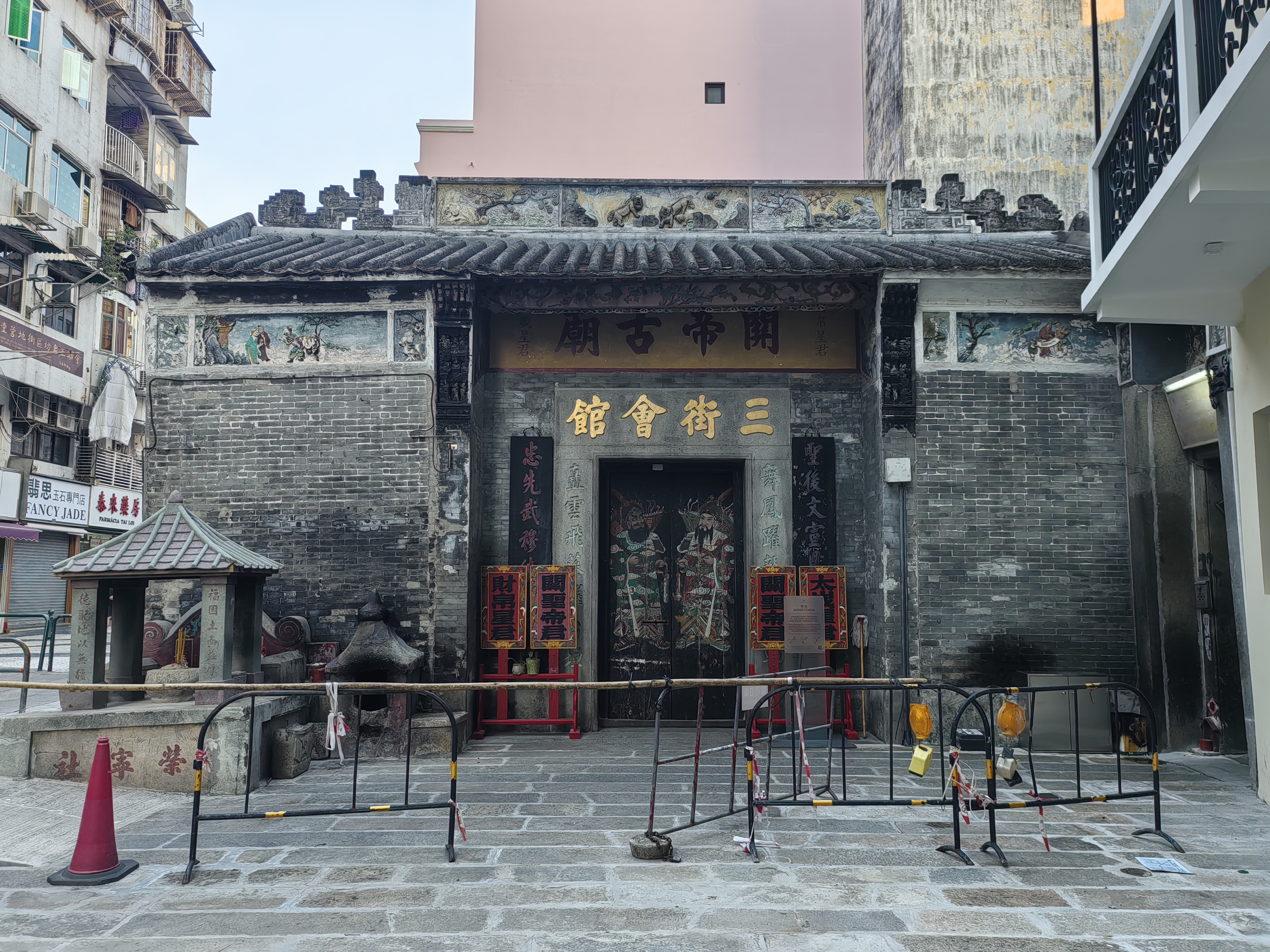

Location
- Location: Sé, Macau, China
- Interactive map of Sam Kai Vui Kun

Architecture
- Type: Temple

Sam Kai Vui Kun, known also as Kuan Tai Temple, (Chinese: 三街會館, Portuguese: Templo de Kuan Tai) is located in front of St. Dominic's Market Complex, near Senado Square in Sé, Macau, China. The temple was built in 1750.

Kuan Tai (Chinese: 關帝) is the Cantonese pronunciation of Guandi, Emperor Guan, an important general during the Three Kingdoms period in China, being now honored and worshiped in Taoism, Confucianism and Chinese Buddhism.

== History ==
In 2005, the temple became one of the designated sites of the Historic Centre of Macau enlisted on UNESCO World Heritage List.

== See also ==
- A-Ma Temple, built in 1488
- Kun Iam Temple, built in 1627
- Tam Kung Temple (Macau), built in 1862
- Na Tcha Temple, built in 1888
- Martial temple
- Man Mo Temple (Hong Kong)
- Kwan Tai temples in Hong Kong
- Hip Tin temples in Hong Kong
