= Shipyards in Macau =

Shipyards in Macau was once part of a shipbuilding industry that existed before disappearing after 2006.

== History ==
Shipbuilding had existed in Macau for centuries but large scale beginning in the 1850s, peaked in the 1950s with 30 facilities and lasted until the 1980s before disappearing in 2006.

The industry which focused in building fishing vessels (namely wooden junks) used in Hong Kong and China was challenged by cheaper metal boats from China.

== Coloane ==
The village of Lai Chi Vun Village was once home to at least 17 shipbuilders and now vacant. Veng Lok Shipyard was once located in Lai Chi Vun. Most other shipyards are abandoned and crumbling buildings facing demolition since 2016.

== Model Shipbuilder ==
Today the only shipbuilding exists in Lai Chi Vun Village where Macao Association of Shipyard Workers builds model junks.
