= Chapel of St. Francis Xavier =

Church in Macau, China

Coordinates: 22°7′0.9″N 113°33′5.2″E

- Traditional Chinese: 聖方濟各聖堂
- Simplified Chinese: 圣方济各圣堂
- Cantonese Yale: Shing fōng jai gok shing tòhng
Transcriptions
Standard Mandarin
- Hanyu Pinyin: Shèng Fāngjǐgè Shèngtáng
Yue: Cantonese
- Yale Romanization: Shing fōng jai gok shing tòhng
- Jyutping: shing3 fong1 zai3 gok3 sing3 tong4

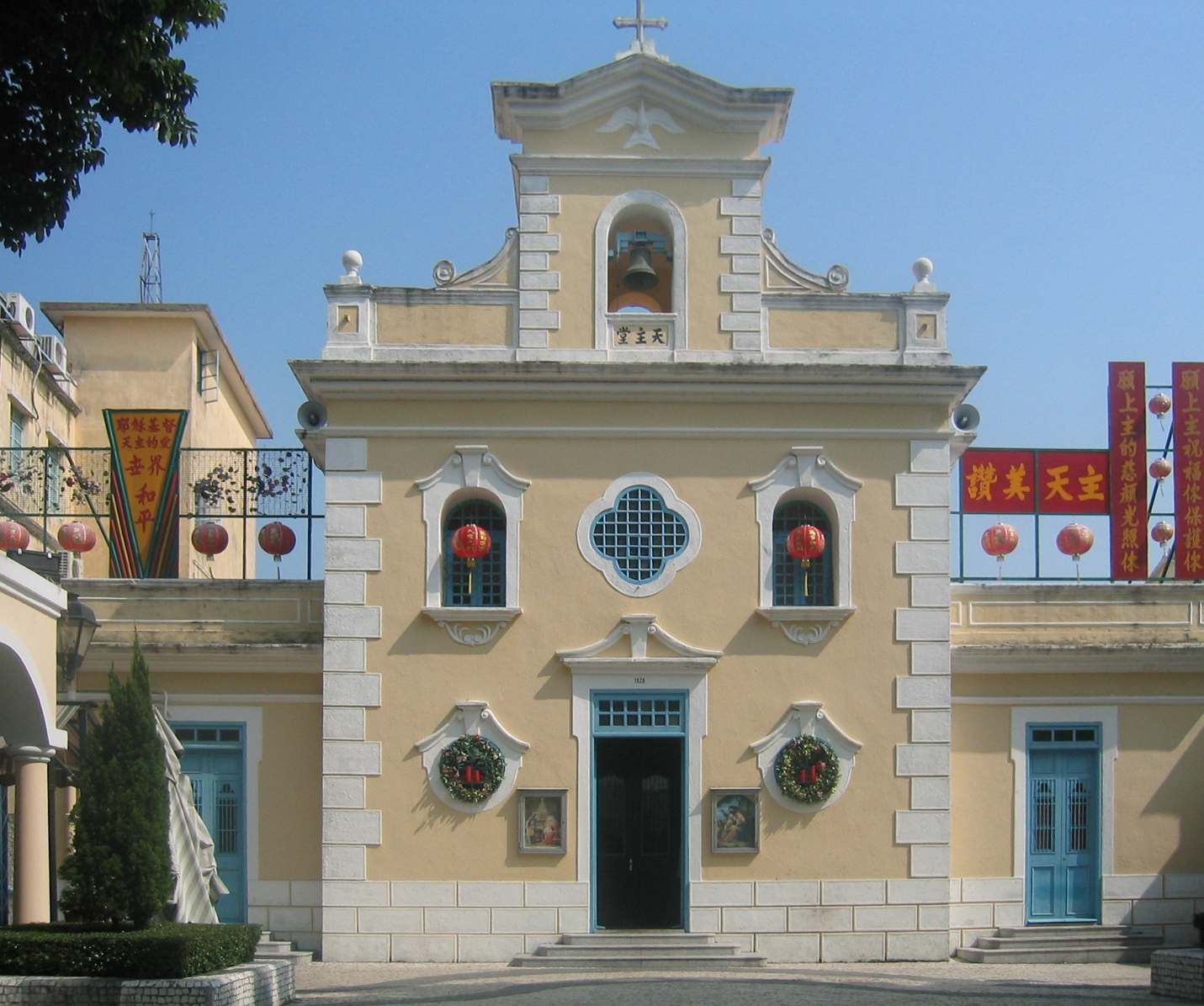
Chapel of St. Francis Xavier

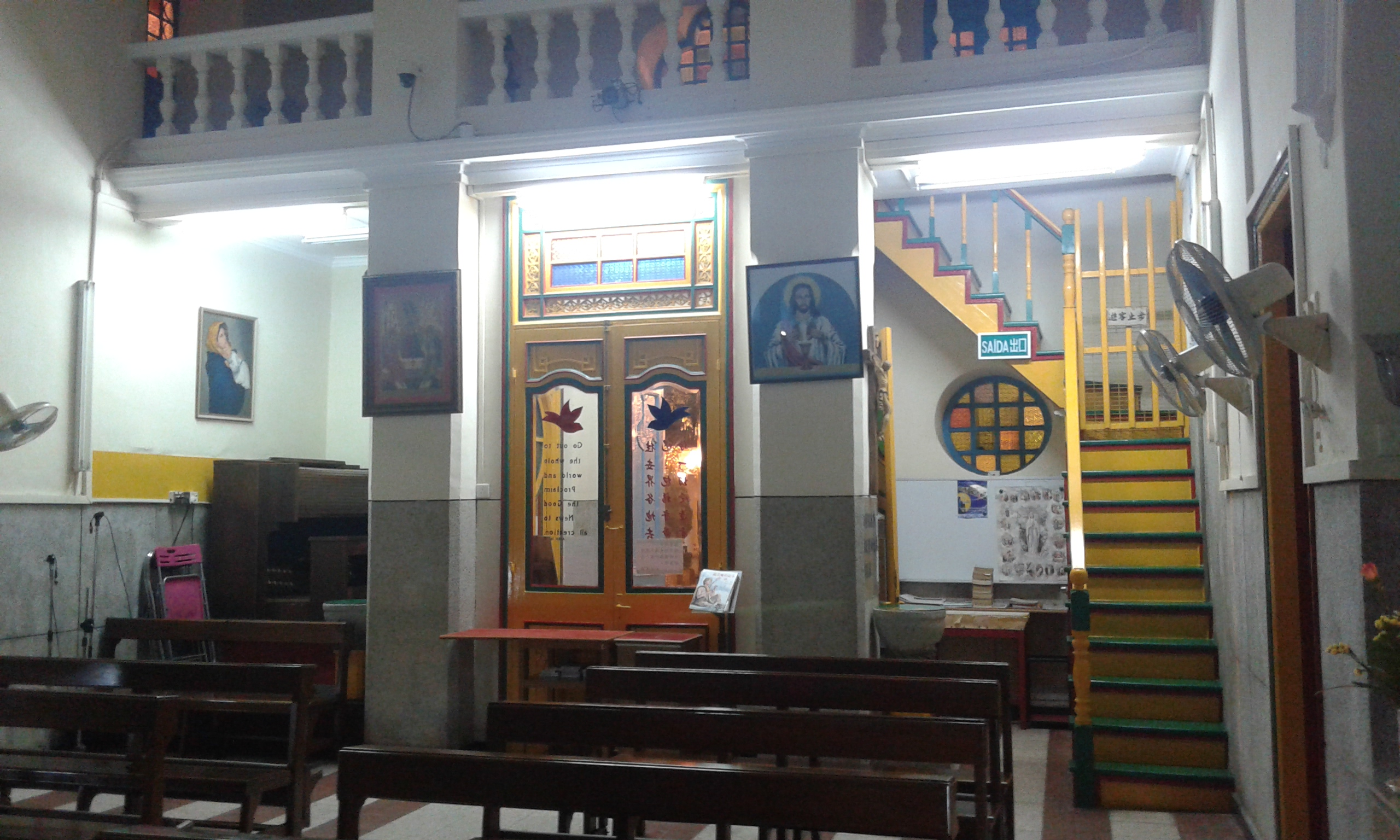
Interior of Chapel of St. Francis Xavier

Chapel of St. Francis Xavier (Chinese: 聖方濟各聖堂, Portuguese: Capela de São Francisco Xavier) is a church located on the island of Coloane, Macau. The chapel, built in 1928, is located on the southwestern coast of the island and stands near a monument commemorating a victory over pirates in 1910.

== Relics ==
The chapel used to contain some of the most sacred Christian relics in Asia, including the remains of 26 foreign and Japanese Catholic priests who were crucified in Nagasaki in 1597, as well as those of some of the Japanese Christians who were killed during the Shimabara Rebellion in 1637. They are now located in the Museum of Sacred Art and Crypt which was opened in 1996. Another relic was a bone from the arm of St. Francis Xavier, who died in 1552 on Shangchuan Island, 50 miles (80 km) from Macau. This relic has been transferred to St. Joseph's Church.
