= Tam Kung Temple, Malaysia =

Chinese temple in Sandakan, Malaysia

Tam Kung Temple
- Malay: Tokong Tam Kung; Chinese: 谭公爷庙
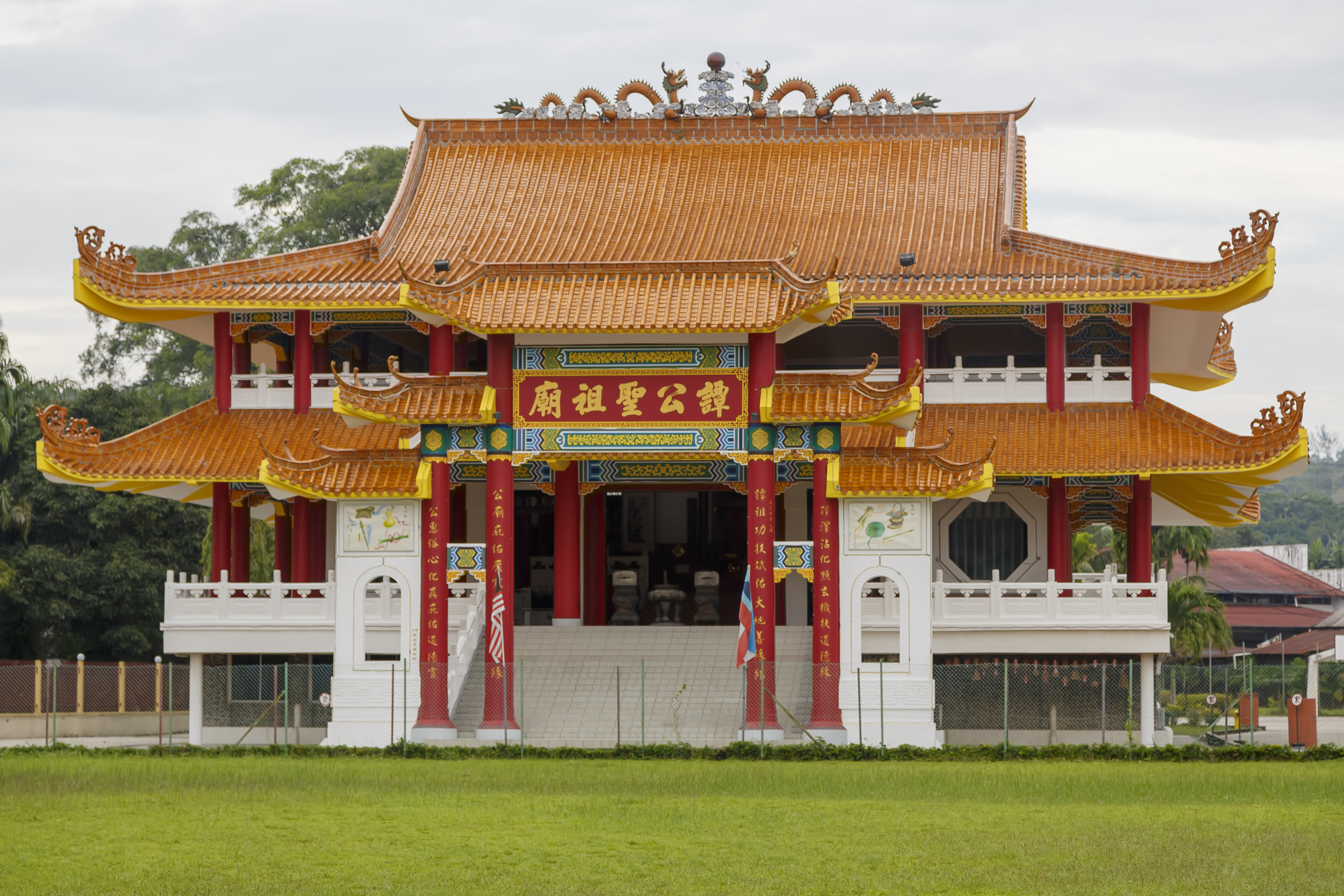

Religion
- Affiliation: Taoism
- District: Sandakan District

Location
- Location: Sandakan
- State: Sabah
- Country: Malaysia
- Geographic coordinates: 5°51′29.61″N 118°6′42.763″E

Architecture
- Type: Chinese temple
- Date established: 1894

Tam Kung Temple (Chinese: 谭公爷庙) is a Chinese temple located at Mile 1.5 of North Road in Sandakan, Sabah, Malaysia. The temple was established in 1894 by Hakka immigrants in Sandakan.
