= Coloane =

Area of Macau

Coloane (São Francisco Xavier) 路環 (聖方濟堂區)
- Freguesia
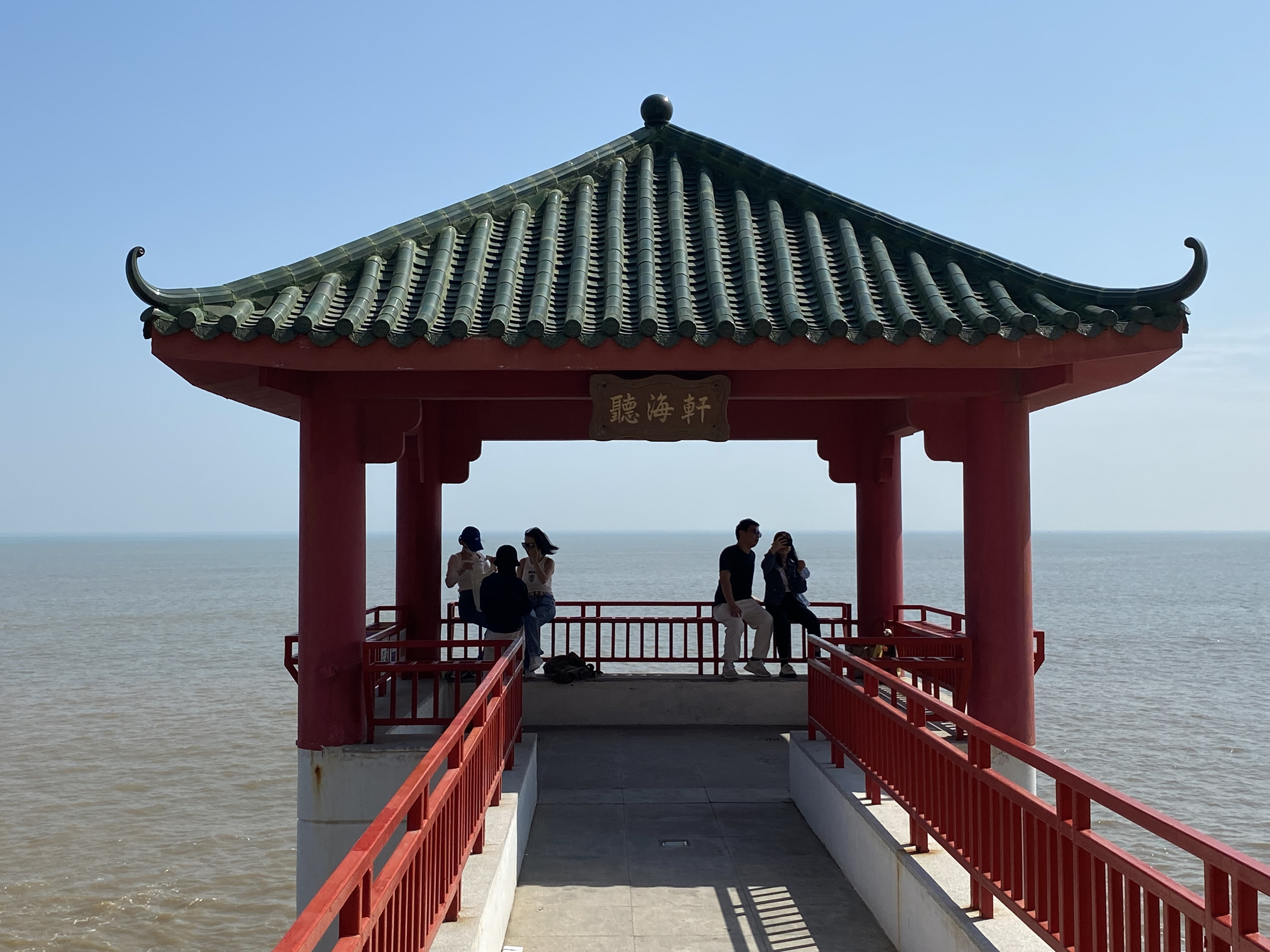
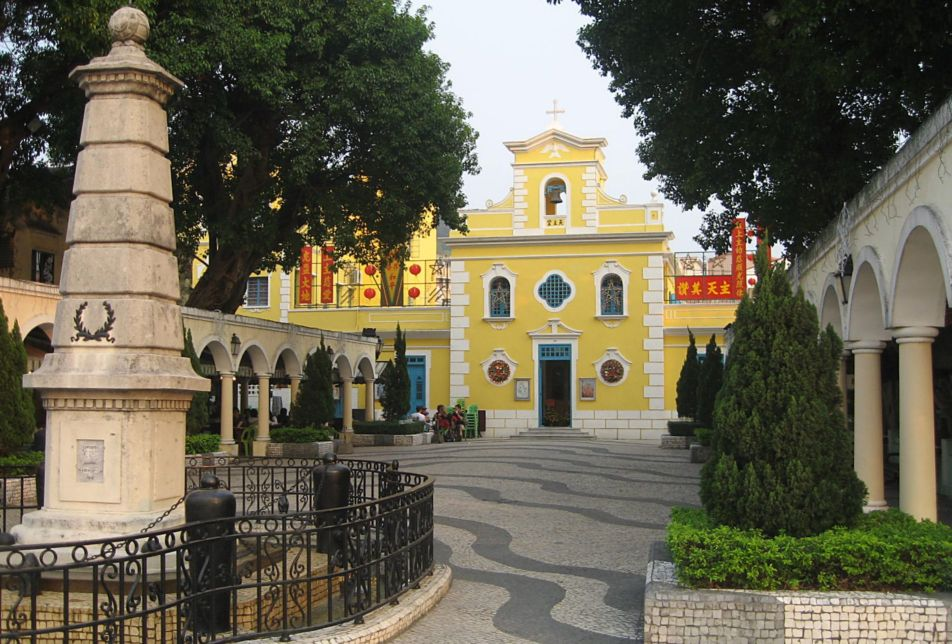
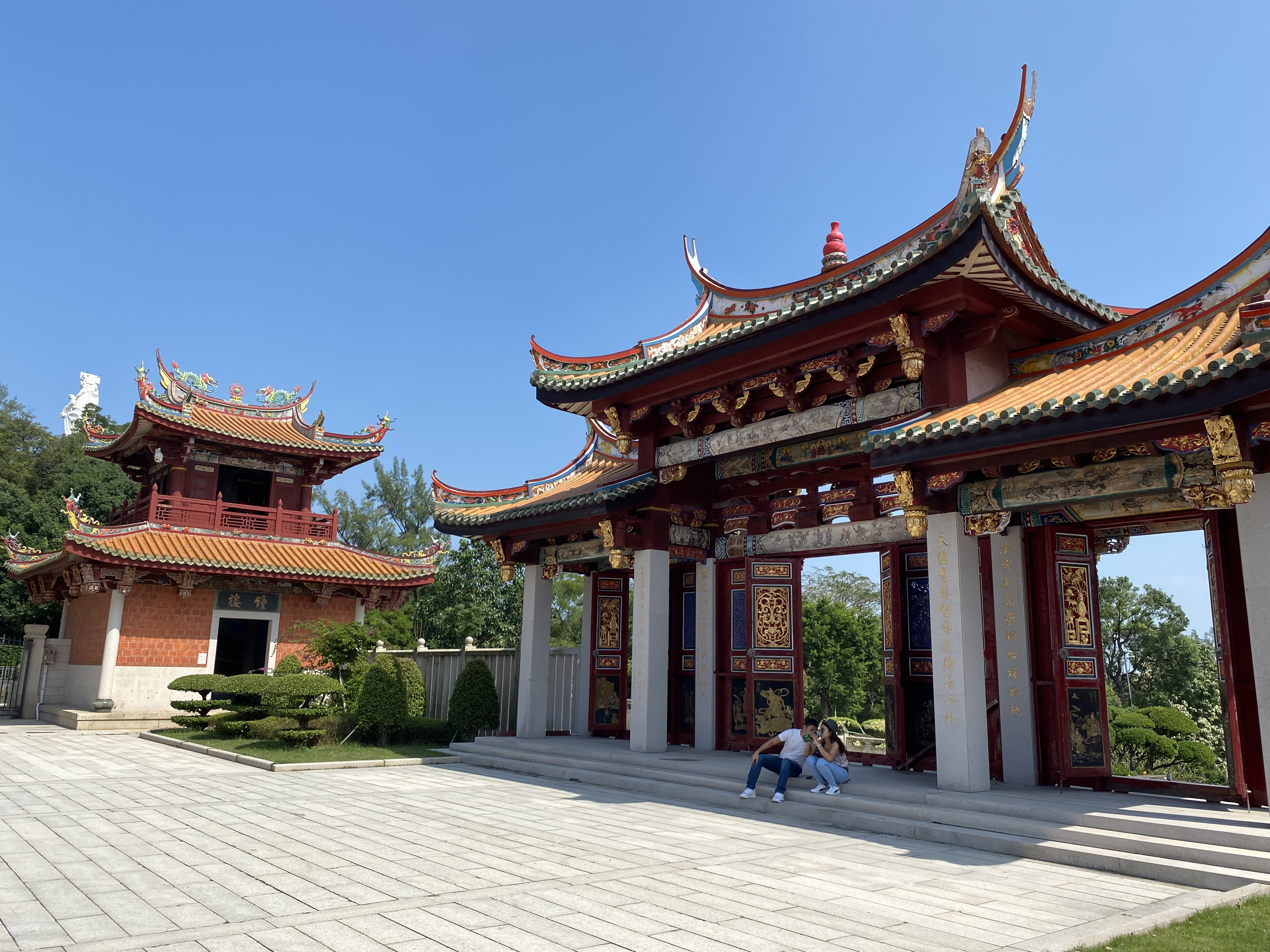
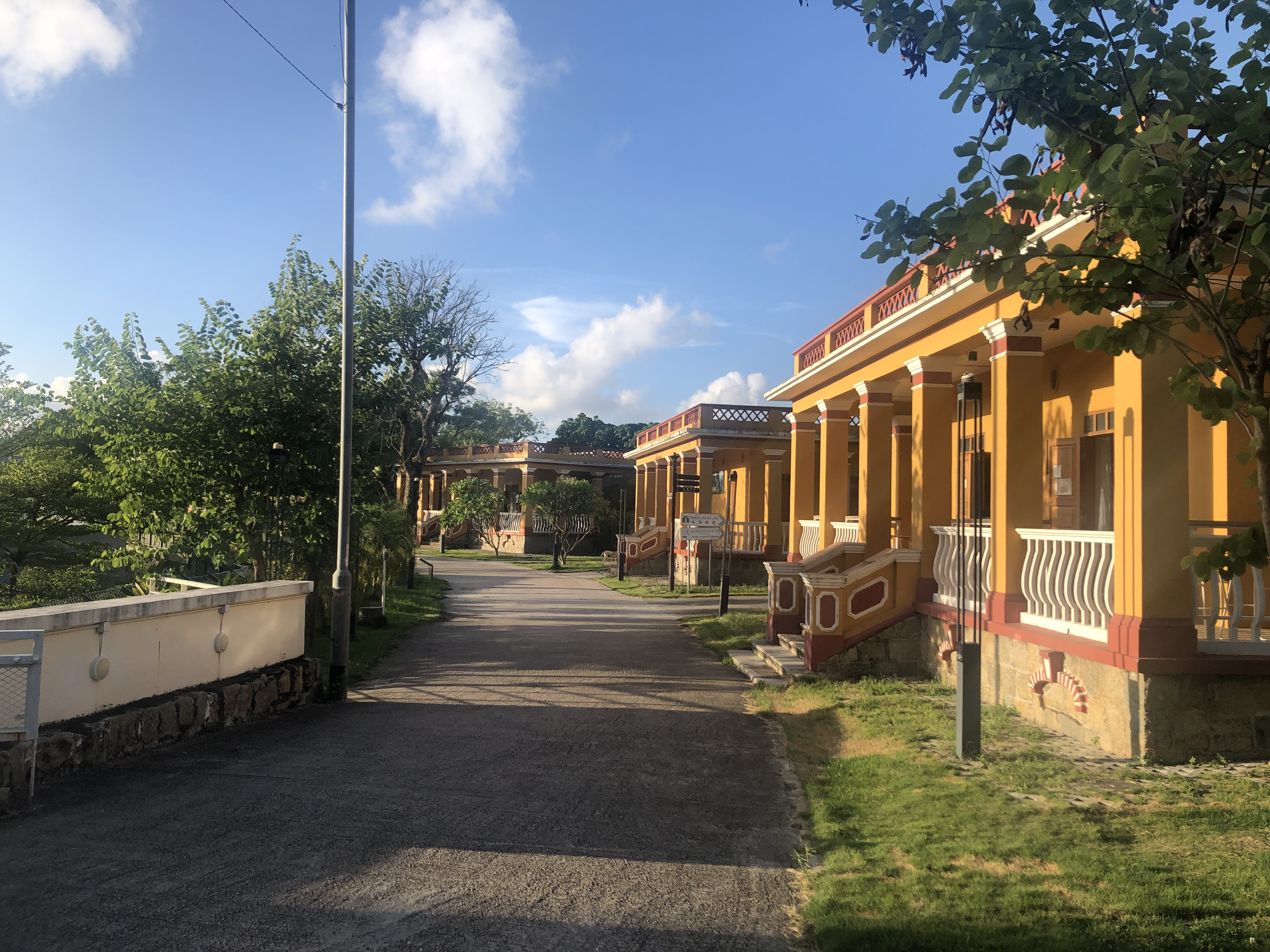
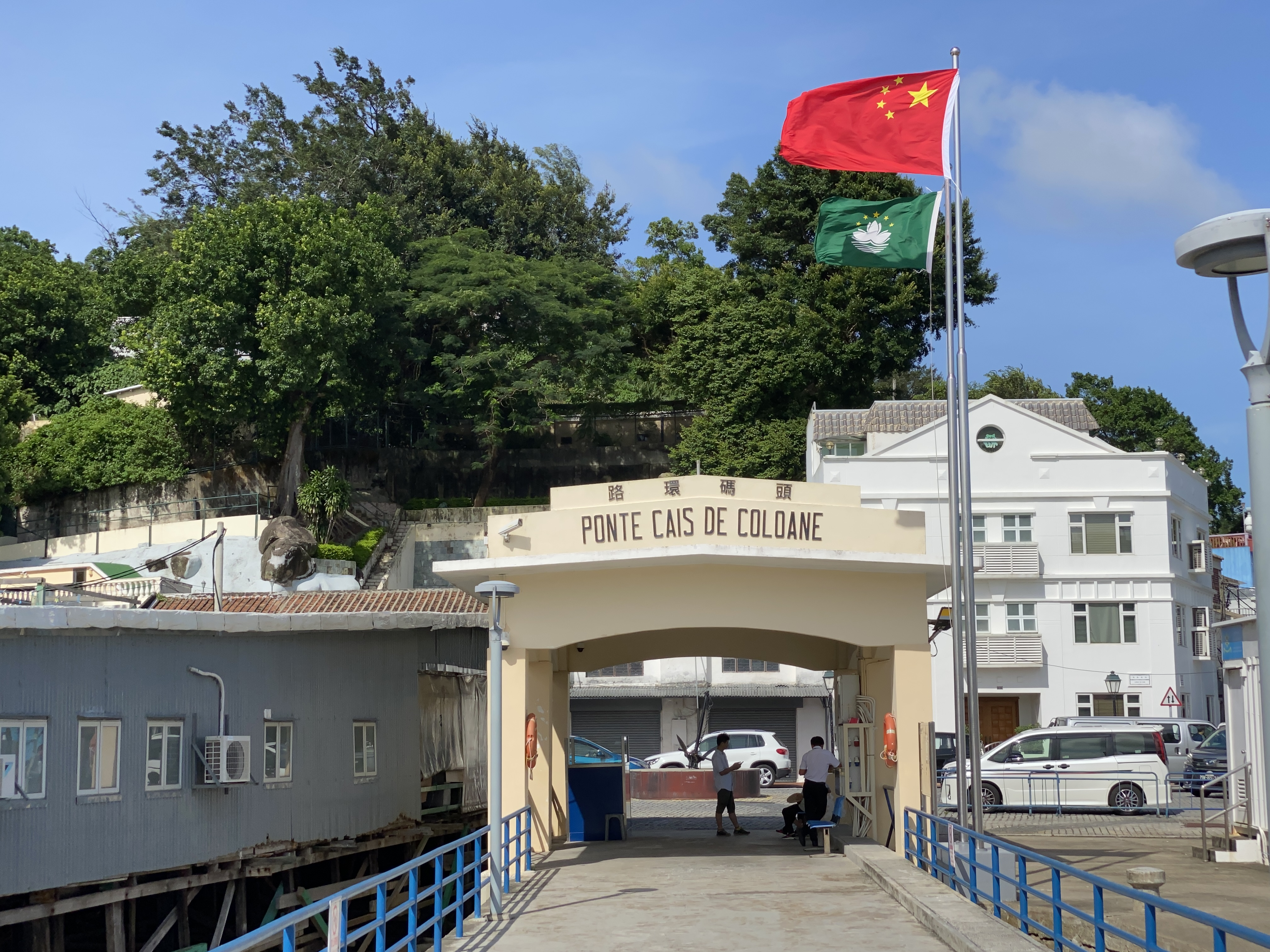
- Hac Sá Long Chao Kok Chapel of St. Francis Xavier Aldeia Cultural de A-Má Village de Nosa Senhora de Ká-Hó Ponte Cais De Coloane

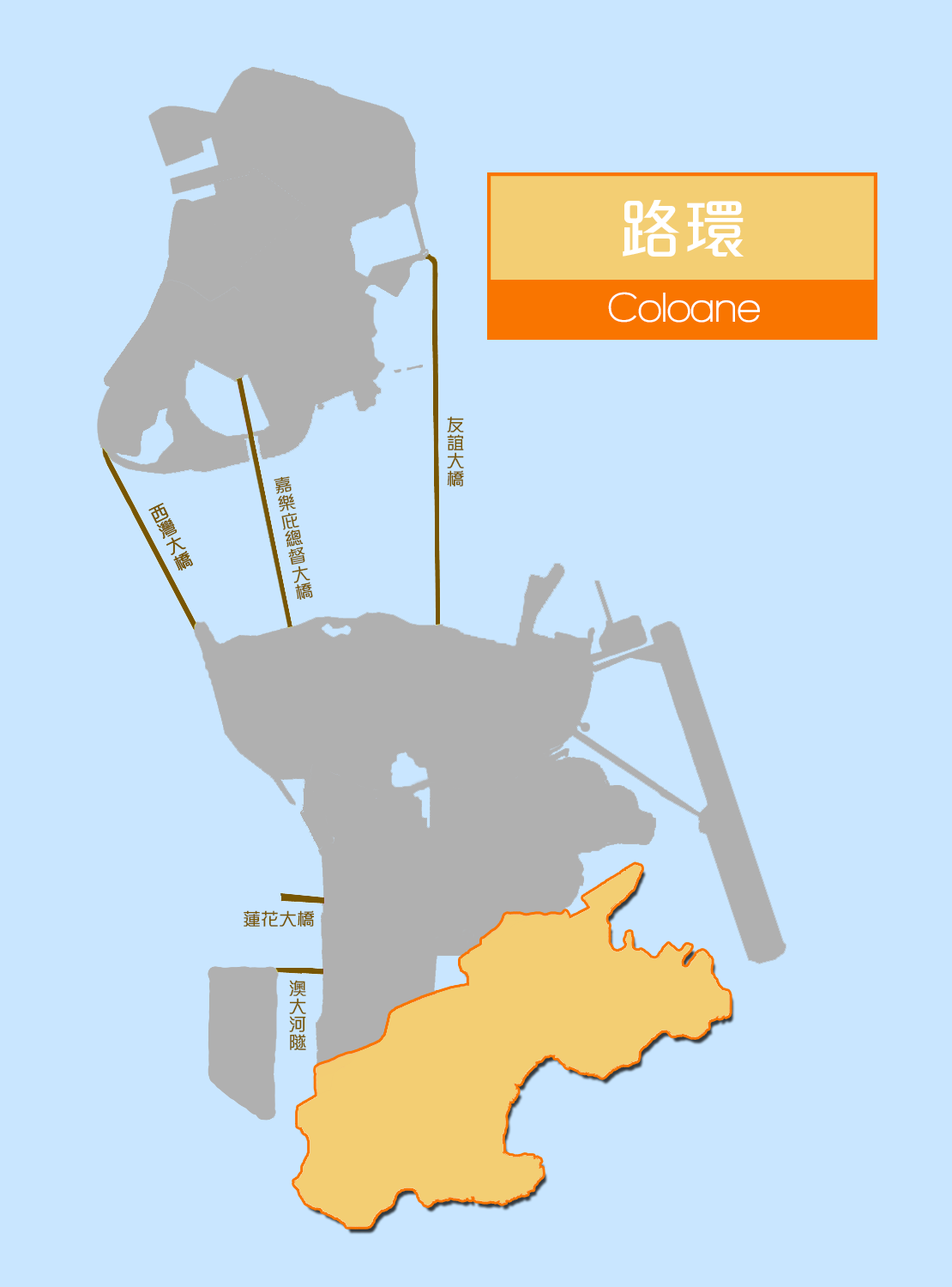
- Freguesia de São Francisco Xavier in Macau
- Coordinates: 22°07′34″N 113°34′01″E
- Country: China
- SAR: Macau
- Freguesia: Freguesia de São Francisco Xavier‍ (coterminous)

Area
  - Total: 7.6 km^{2} (2.9 sq mi)

Population (2013)
  - Total: 9,300
  - Density: 1,200/km^{2} (3,200/sq mi)
- Time zone: UTC+8 (Macau Standard)

São Francisco Xavier Parish
- Traditional Chinese: 聖方濟堂區
- Simplified Chinese: 圣方济堂区
- Cantonese Yale: shing fōng tsai gok tòhng kūi
Transcriptions
Standard Mandarin
- Hanyu Pinyin: Shèng Fāngjǐgè Tángqū
Yue: Cantonese
- Yale Romanization: shing fōng tsai gok tòhng kūi
- Jyutping: sing3 fong1 zai3 gok3 tong4 keoi1

Coloane
- Traditional Chinese: 路環
- Simplified Chinese: 路环
- Cantonese Yale: louh wàhn
Transcriptions
Standard Mandarin
- Hanyu Pinyin: Lùhuán
Yue: Cantonese
- Yale Romanization: louh wàhn
- Jyutping: lou6 waan4

Coloane (Chinese: 路環; Jyutping: lou6 waan4, Portuguese: Coloane) is the southernmost area in Macau, connected to Taipa through the area known as Cotai, which is largely built from reclaimed land. Known as "Lou Wan" in Cantonese, Coloane forms the southern part of Macau. Its population consists of several settlements dotted around the parish, such as Vila de Coloane (Coloane Village), Hac Sa, Ká-Hó, and Cheoc Van. Administratively, the boundaries of the traditional civil parish (Portuguese: freguesia) of São Francisco Xavier are coterminous with that of Coloane.

== Etymology ==
Coloane was historically known in Cantonese as "Nine-inlet Mountain" (九澳山; gau2 ou3 saan1; transcribed in Portuguese as Ká-Hó) and "Salt-stove Bay" (鹽灶灣; jim4 zou3 waan1). The Portuguese name of "Coloane" is derived from the Cantonese pronunciation of "Passing-road Ring" (過路環; gwo3 lou6 waan4).

== Geography ==
Coloane has an area of 8.07 km^{2} (3 sq mi), is 4 km (2 mi) long and is 5.6 km (3 mi) from the Macau Peninsula. The narrowest part of Coloane is 300 metres (980 ft). The highest points in Macau are eastern and central Coloane, with the highest point being the 170.6 metres (560 ft) Coloane Alto (疊石塘山; dip6 sek6 tong4 saan1, Alto de Coloane).

Before land reclamation works started beginning in the 1990s, Coloane was a former island, separated from Taipa by the bay of Seac Pai Van, which from 1969 was crossed by a 2.2 kilometres (1.4 mi) causeway, the Estrada do Istmo, connecting Coloane to Taipa. However by the early 2000s, extensive land reclamation physically connected the two islands and a new area called Cotai, intended primarily for entertainment and leisure purposes, was built between Taipa and Coloane, now home to the Cotai Strip and several other casino projects.

The northern shore of the parish is 4.5 metres (15 ft) deep, and is the site of the Macau Deepwater Port.

The eastern Hac Sa Beach (黑沙海灘; hak1 saa1 hoi2 taan1, Baía de Hác Sá) and the southern Cheoc Van Bay (竹灣; zuk1 waan1, Baía de Cheoc Van) are popular swimming beaches and overlook the South China Sea.

== History ==
From the Song dynasty onwards and until the Portuguese annexation of Coloane in 1864, Coloane largely served as a sea salt farm for China. The annexation of Coloane in the 1860s came as Portugal sought to expand its influence over Macau and affirm its sovereignty, turning the city into a fully-fledged colony and expanding its area to include Taipa, Ilha Verde, Coloane and portions of Hengqin (Montanha). Due to Coloane’s sparse habitation, mountainous terrain, and geographical isolation yet close adjacency to the flourishing trade on the Macau Peninsula, from the Ming Dynasty, it had also become a refuge of piracy, which resulted in Coloane’s fishermen having competition from both smugglers and pirates. According to historians, most pirates were likely fishermen seeking to make money. As such, the annexation by Portugal also sought to dislodge the pirates who had been using Coloane as a refuge and disrupt Macau’s trade.

Despite the annexation, Coloane remained largely deserted, and its Portuguese sovereignty remained disputed as late as 1912 by the local government in Guangdong, which wanted property owners in Coloane not to be forced to pay taxes to the Macau colonial government. Despite several anti-piracy efforts, Coloane remained a base of piracy until an incident in July 1910 where a group of 18 Chinese children were kidnapped by a band of pirates, requesting a ransom amount of 35,000 Macanese patacas. In what became the last battle fought by Portuguese troops in Macau, all 310 pirates active in the Coloane area were captured or fled after a 10-day battle, which saw Coloane bombed as a result and some of its inhabitants incarcerated and charged with helping pirates.

Many of the pirates that fled were caught either by the colonial Macau government, the British colonial government in Hong Kong, or the Qing government in China. Most faced the death penalty by decapitation.

For many years, July 13 has served as a local holiday in Coloane, celebrating the victory over the pirates, with a statue in front of the Church of St. Francis Xavier (in Largo Eduardo Marques) commemorating the event.

Locally famous for its rural character, the island started to become more populated after the Estrada do Istmo causeway connecting Coloane with Taipa was completed in 1969, and became to become rapidly developed and populated starting in the 1990s, following the beginning of land reclamation works that created the area of Cotai and developed new towns such as Seac Pai Van.

== Coloane Village ==
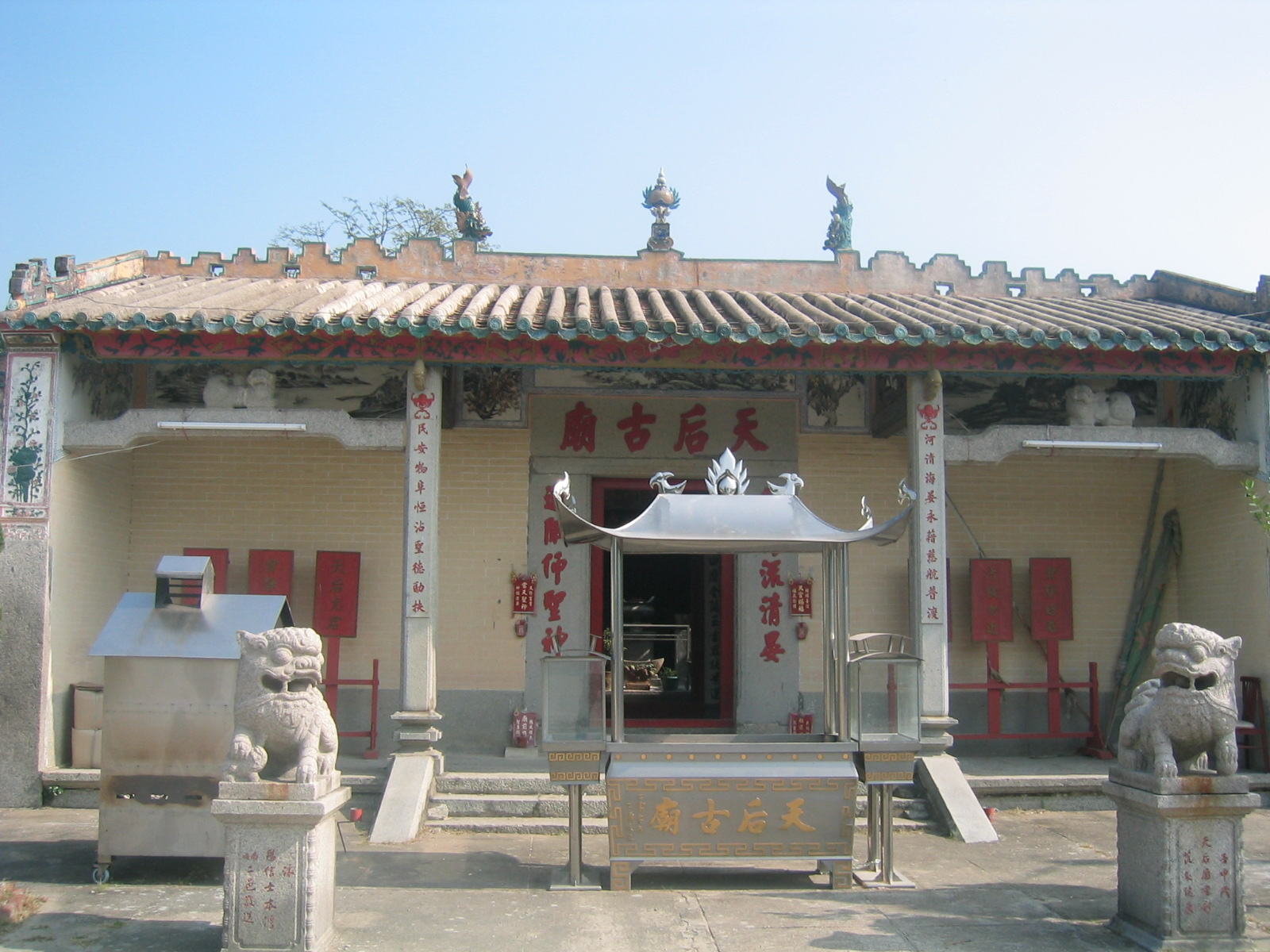
Old Tin Hau Temple

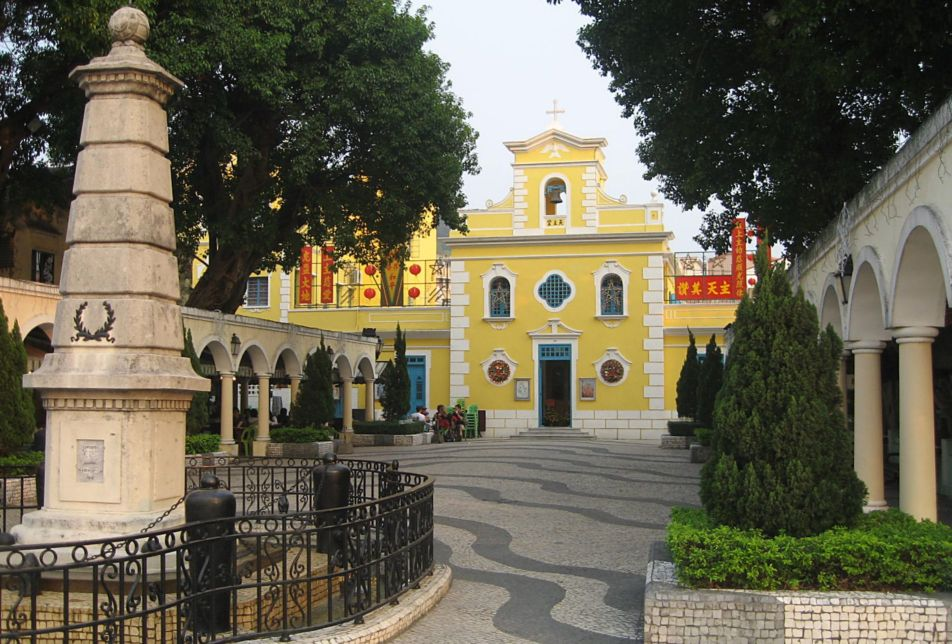
Chapel of St. Francis Xavier

Coloane Village (Vila de Coloane; 路環村; Louhwàahn Chyūn), located on the southwestern coast of Coloane, is the main settlement in the area.

The village centers on Eduardo Marques Square, which is a rectangle paved in cobblestones that are black, white and yellow, laid out in a wavy pattern reminiscent of the sea. The square faces a seaside promenade that traces the channel dividing Macau from the mainland Chinese hills on Hengqin (Montanha). At the eastern end of the square stands the Chapel of St. Francis Xavier, built in 1928.

A Tam Kung Temple is located at the southern end of Avenida de Cinco de Outubro (十月初五馬路).

== Lai Chi Vun Village ==
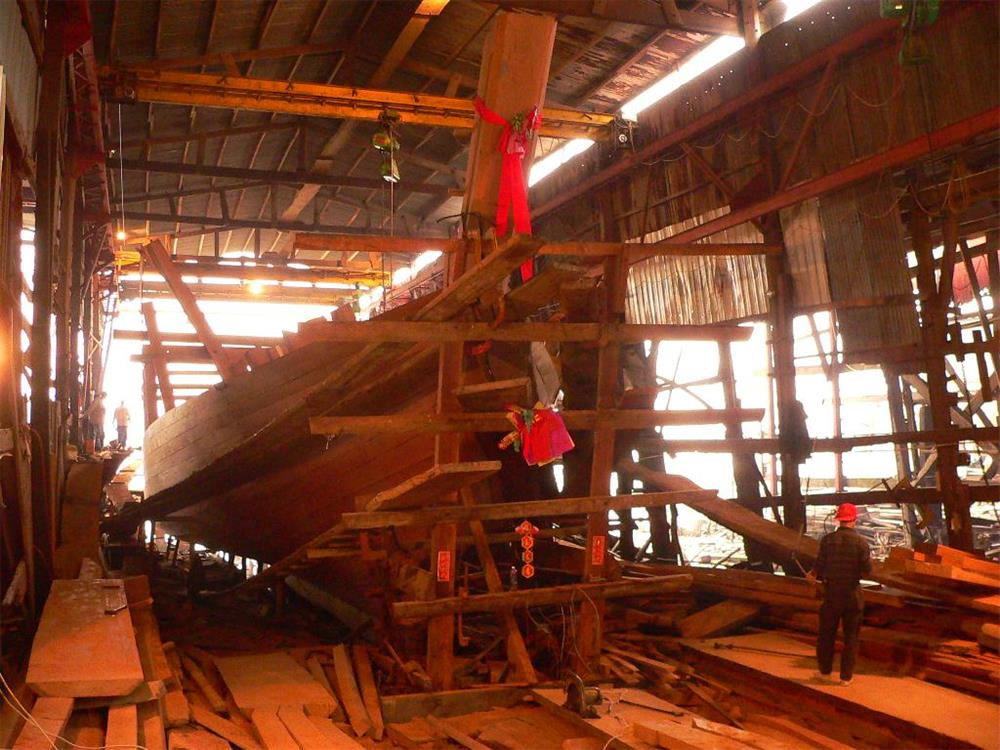
A ship being built in a local shipyard.

Lai Chi Vun Village (Vila de Lai Chi Vun; 荔枝碗村) is a small settlement located directly north of Coloane Village. The route to the village, the Estrada de Lai Chi Vun, begins at the intersection of Estrada de Seac Pai Van and Estrada do Campo in the north and ends at Largo do Cais in the south. The towering banyan tree at the northern end of the marks the northern entrance to the village, whose name is associated with its abundance in lychee trees in the past and its bowl-shaped bay.

The shipyards that once lay beyond the village are nowadays left in disuse. The single-storey business premises of Veng Lok Shipyard and of Association of Shipbuilders of Macau-Taipa-Coloane are located inside the small courtyard to the right of the road atop the hill. All the way down the road to the western side is the one-storey office building of the Customs office of Coloane in Portuguese architectural style.

Coloane Pier, which was once the only entry and exit point of Coloane, is located along the waterfront facing Largo do Cais the southern end of the road.

As of 2018, the Lai Chi Vun shipyards are being evaluated to determine whether they meet the Macau SAR’s legal definition of cultural relics. The site is potentially significant because Macau's shipbuilding industry began at the shipyards and because of the formation of a historical village near the area.

== Tourist attractions ==
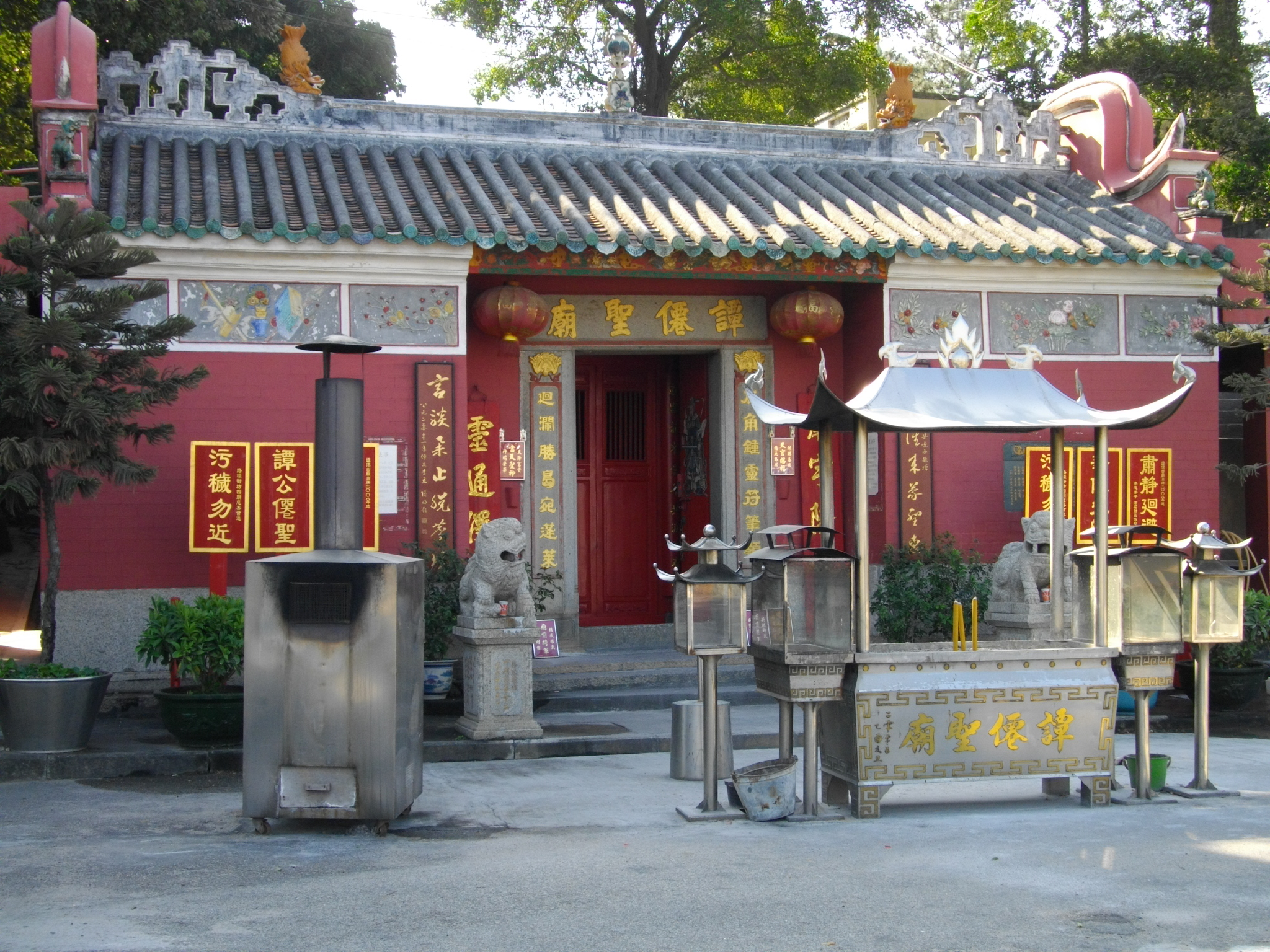
Tam Kung Temple

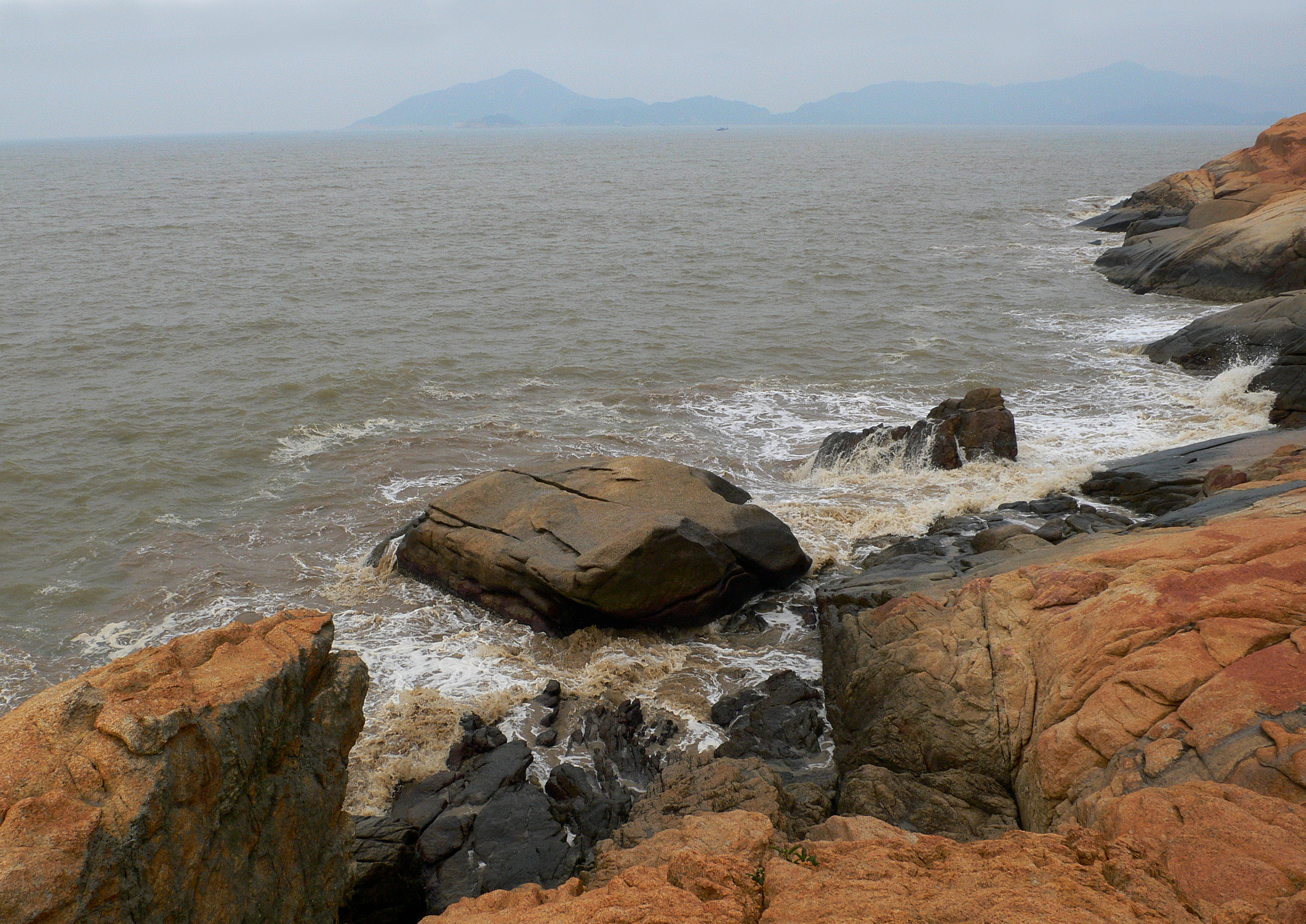
Southern coast of Coloane

Temples

- Sam Seng Temple (三圣宫; Templo Sam Seng), also called Kam Fa Temple (金花庙; Templo Kam Fa) located at 2 Rua dos Navegantes in Coloane Village. Dedicated to Kam Fa, Kun Iam and Va Kuong, it was built in 1865.
- Kun Iam Temple in Coloane Village, located at Travessa do Caetano.
- Old Tin Hau Temple (天后古廟; Antigo Templo de Tin Hau) in Coloane Village
- Tam Kung Temple in Coloane Village. Dedicated to Lord Tam, a Taoist god of seafarers, it was built in 1862.
- Hung Shing Temple in Hac Sa Village
- Sam Seng Temple (三聖站廟; Templo Sam Seng), in the Ká-Hó (九澳) area, in the northeastern part of the island
- Kun Iam Temple (Ká-Hó)

Churches

- Chapel of St. Francis Xavier (聖方濟聖堂; Capela de São Francisco Xavier) of the Freguesia de São Francisco Xavier. The chapel, built in 1928, is located on the southwestern coast of Coloane and stands near a monument commemorating a victory over pirates in 1910. The chapel used to contain some of the most sacred Christian relics in Asia, including the remains of 26 foreign and Japanese Catholic priests who were crucified in Nagasaki in 1597, as well as those of some of the Japanese Christians who were killed during the Shimabara Rebellion in 1637. They are now located in the Museum of Sacred Art, opened in 1996 next to the Ruins of St. Paul's. Another relic was a bone from the arm of St. Francis Xavier, who died in 1552 on Shangchuan Island, 50 miles (80 km) from Macau. This relic has been transferred to St. Joseph's Church.
- Church of Our Lady of Sorrows (九澳七苦聖母小堂; Igreja de Nossa Senhora das Dores) in the Ká-Hó area

Others

- "Fernando", a Portuguese restaurant at Baía de Hác Sá, is famous amongst locals in Macau and visitors from Hong Kong
- Hac Sa Park
- Macao Giant Panda Pavilion
- Natural and Agrarian Museum
- Seac Pai Van Park
- Hiking trails of Alto de Coloane
- Former leprosarium at Ká-Hó; home to five colonial Portuguese-style homes, once used to house female leprosy patients.
- A-Ma Statue (媽祖像; Estátua de A-Ma) opened on October 28, 1998 (lunar calendar: September 9)
- Balneário-style beachside resort towns of Hac Sa and Cheoc Van

== Government ==
- Correctional Services Bureau

== Infrastructure ==
- Coloane A Power Station
- Coloane B Power Station

== Healthcare ==
Health centres operated by the Macau government in Coloane include Posto de Saúde Coloane (路環衛生站) and Posto de Saúde Provisório de Seac Pai Van de Coloane (路環石排灣臨時衛生站).

== Education ==
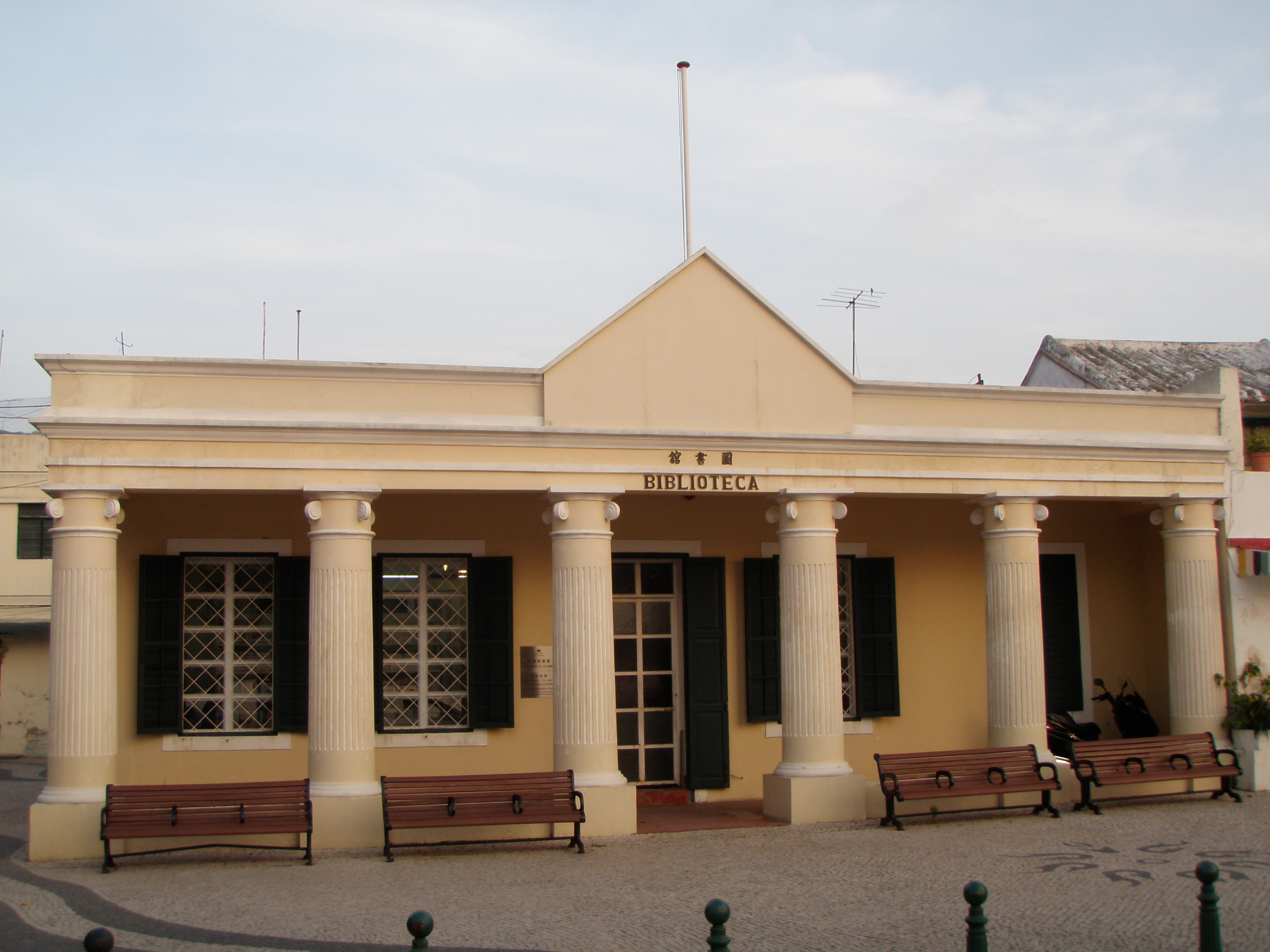
Coloane Library

Public schools:

- Escola Luso-Chinesa de Coloane (路環中葡學校) – Special education

Subsidized private schools:

- Escola Dom Luís Versíglia (雷鳴道主教紀念學校) – Primary and secondary school
- Escola de São José de Ká Hó (九澳聖若瑟學校) – Preschool through junior high school

Macao Public Library operates the Coloane Library (Biblioteca de Coloane; 路環圖書館), which occupies 170 square metres (1,800 sq ft) space in the former Coloane Public Elementary School (路環公局市立學校; Escola Básica Pública de Coloane), a Portuguese-style building. In 1983 the building was renovated so it could serve as a library.

== Transport ==
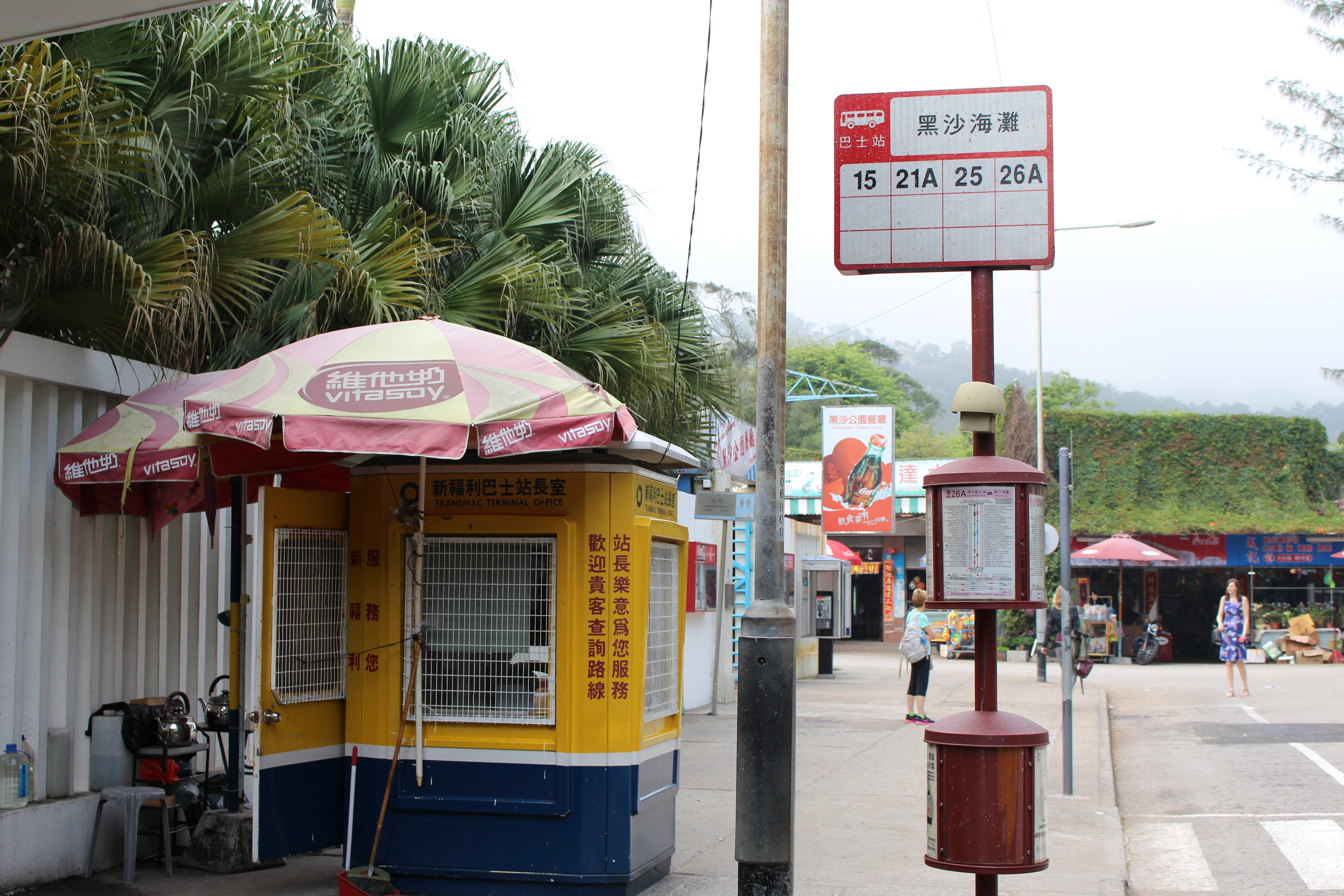
Bus stop at Hac Sa Beach

Coloane is served by buses and taxis, and is planned to be served in the future by the Seac Pai Van LRT line.

== See also ==
- Kai Ho Port
- Macau Prison
- List of islands and peninsulas of Macau
