= Land reclamation in Macau =

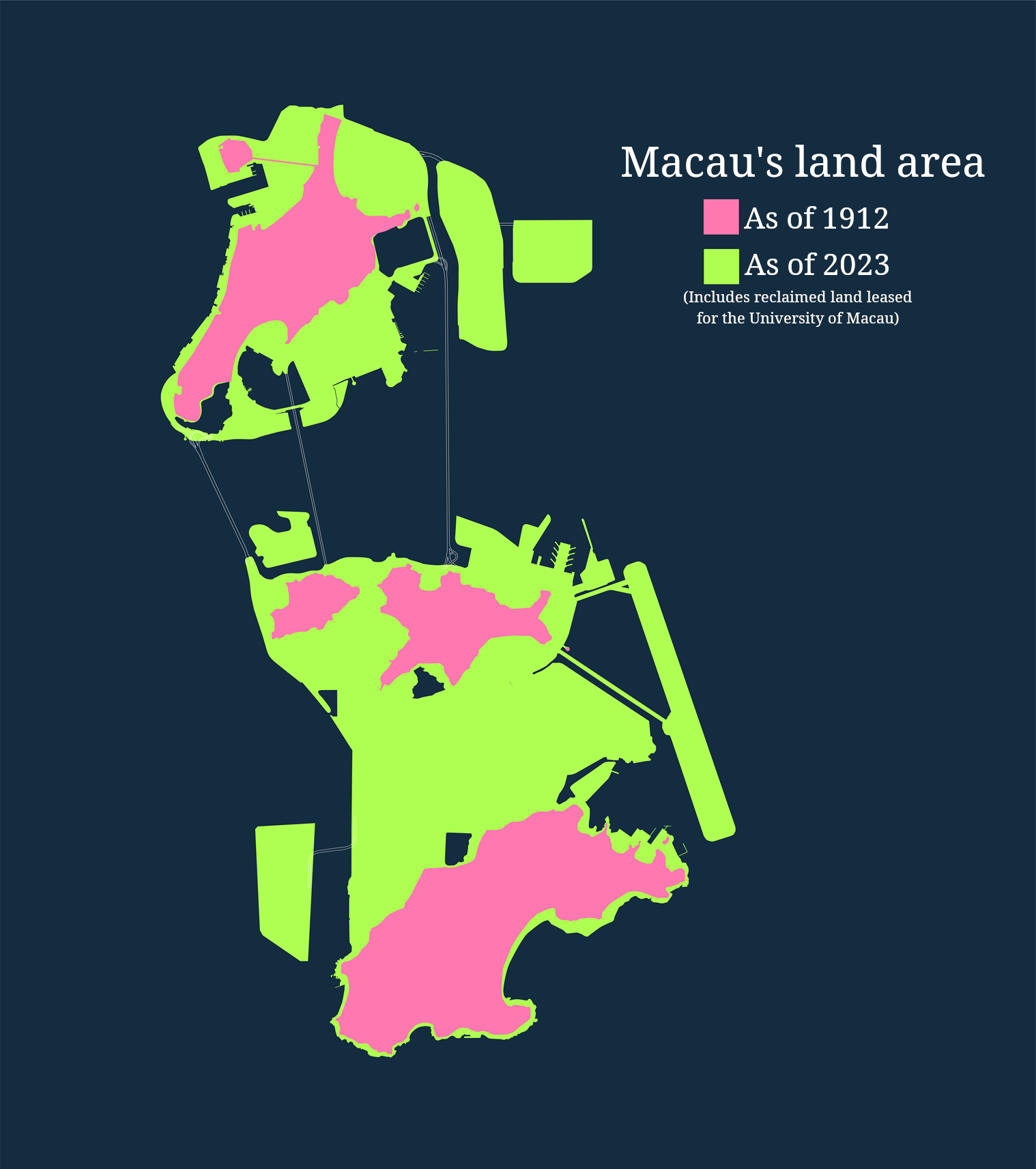
Since the early 20th century Macau's land area has tripled. (The map includes the reclaimed land of the University of Macau leased from Hengqin.)

The land area of Macau has tripled due to land reclamation. Macau's original territory consisted of the Macau Peninsula, including the offshore Ilha Verde, as well as the southern islands of Taipa and Coloane. Each of these areas has been expanded through reclamation. Additionally, the reclamation of the Cotai area between Taipa and Coloane combined them into a single landmass.

The first land reclamation efforts were small expansions to the Macau Peninsula, often filling in parts of shallow bays. More significant reclamation began in 1912, responding to the needs of a growing population. Expansion of the Macau Peninsula integrated Ilha Verde into the main landmass, while Taipa and Coloane also saw reclamation during this period. These initial reclamation projects continued until 1949, when the city entered an economic downturn.

A new period of large-scale reclamation began in 1984, with new land added to the peninsula, Taipa, and Coloane. Starting in 1989, the Macau International Airport was reclaimed east of Taipa, while the land between Taipa and Coloane was systematically reclaimed from 1989 until 2005, creating Cotai. The 21st century saw the initiation of the Macau New Urban Zone project, as well as the creation of a new island to support the Hong Kong–Zhuhai–Macau Bridge.

The purpose of reclaimed land differs between periods. Expansion in the early 20th century provided residential and manufacturing space. Reclamations in the 1980s helped develop the tourism and gambling industries. While the reclamation has provided more space to the city, it has caused environmental damage such as the destruction of most of the city's coastal wetlands. More recent reclamations have included the development of new urban green spaces, in part to capture more rainwater.

== Background ==
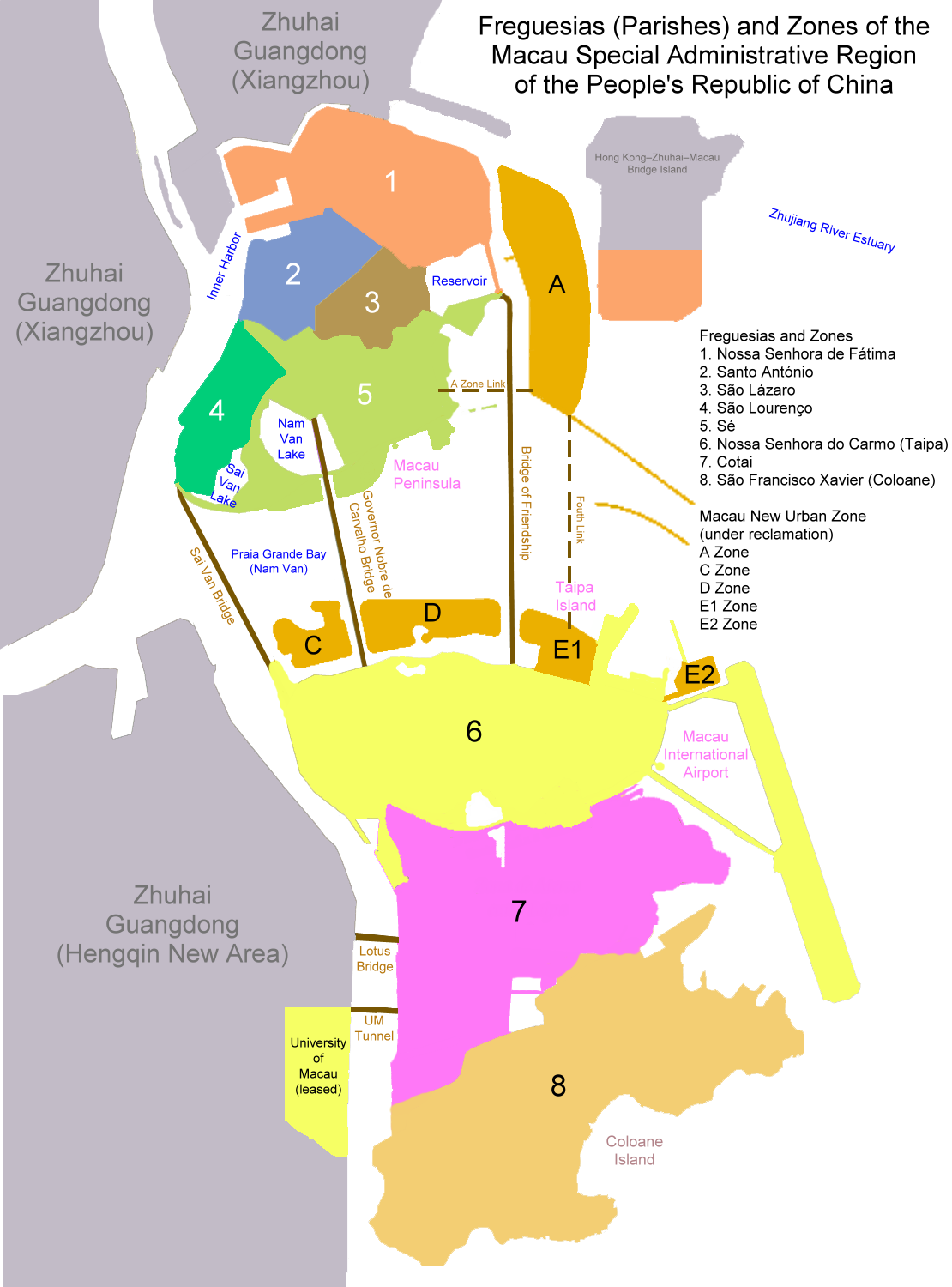
Macau includes natural land in the Macau Peninsula, Taipa, and Coloane, as well as a significant amount of reclaimed land, and reclaimed land leased from Hengqin

Land reclamation is a common response to a lack of land in coastal areas, being seen as a way to both alleviate existing urban pressures and create new economic opportunities. A lack of land is an old problem for Macau, which by the end of the 19th century already had little space remaining on the Macau Peninsula. Macau's status as a Portuguese colony also meant landward expansion into the hinterland was not possible for much of its history. The city has leased land from neighbouring Hengqin to host the University of Macau.

After large-scale land reclamation Macau is one of the most densely populated cities, with 21,055 inhabitants per square kilometre (54,530/sq mi) in 2021. Existing residential land is highly built up, with tall buildings and narrow streets, leading to new land being seen as essential for the development of the city. In addition to simply providing space, land reclamation can also shape terrain to suit the city's needs. In particular, the percentage of Macau that is flat land has significantly increased. For example, the large flat area needed for Macau International Airport was not present in the natural terrain.

Macau lies in a geologically stable area, with no recorded earthquakes above magnitude 5, which helps make land reclamation viable. Its waters are also heavily silted and often as shallow as 1 metre (3.3 ft), due to being near the mouth of the Pearl River. Land reclamation has evolved with technological changes. The first projects were small and relatively cheap, and sometimes privately funded. Larger reclamation in the early 20th century included development plans. As technology progressed, developments from the late 20th century were possible on an even greater scale. Since the start of the 20th century, there have been over 700 land reclamation projects of some kind in Macau.

== History ==
Land reclamation projects at select points from 1912 to 2018. Detailed land use data exists only from 1975.
Year	Number of projects	Reclaimed land (m^{2})
1936	71	2,465,277
1957	53	1,494,784
1975	66	683,574
1986	61	1,011,421
1991	58	1,594,576
1996	62	3,451,865
1999	60	2,366,866
2000	19	1,770,931
2001	15	339,009
2002	7	1,143,329
2003	26	407,611
2004	28	112,725
2005	19	797,884
2006	16	404,645
2007	10	732,528
2008	12	25,931
2009	16	332,067
2010	20	195,166
2011	35	189,645
2012	8	13,230
2013	7	381,608
2014	12	19,970
2015	14	220,293
2016	5	39,729
2017	5	492,082
2018	11	3,189,124
Total	716	23,875,870

At the time of initial Portuguese settlement in the 1500s, what is now the Macau Peninsula was a tidal island of about 3 square kilometres (1.2 sq mi). The initially small population rapidly expanded. Natural sedimentation had led to the formation of a tombolo, connecting the island to the nearby mainland. This sandbar, only a few metres wide, eventually became the location of the border with Mainland China. Sedimentation also formed what is now the peninsula in the first place, as it originally formed from piles of sediment that formed small islands which later merged and now can be identified as the peninsula's hills. During the early Portuguese period this tombolo continued to collect sediment, turning the island into a peninsula.

In the second half of the 19th century, Portuguese authorities expanded their control across the peninsula and its nearby island of Ilha Verde, as well as to the large islands of Taipa and Coloane. Taipa itself was originally three close but distinct islands, although two merged naturally due to siltation before any artificial land reclamation. The overall land area of the territory after the expansion of Portuguese control was about 10.28 square kilometres (3.97 sq mi).

=== Initial reclamations ===
Some infilling between two roads occurred in 1850. The first dedicated land reclamation took place in 1863. This saw land created from the beach in front of the Macau Government Headquarters (then the Governor's residence), and the widening of the nearby coastal road. Subsequent reclamations created land from other shallow bays, including near Ilha Verde. Some of this reclamation was government ordered, others were due to private efforts.

Other early reclamation efforts in the mid-19th century included extensions to the Port of Macau area. This occurred during a period of economic stagnation, so the works were restricted to shallow waters and were not extensive. These increased the size of the harbour and created new quays. Further expansion of the harbour continued into the 20th century. To the northwest, a causeway was constructed to link Ilha Verde to the peninsula. Eventually the waters near Ilha Verde were completely filled in, creating what became known as the Inner Harbour and merging Ilha Verde with the main peninsula. This northwest reclamation alone created 3.3 square kilometres (1.3 sq mi) by 1910.

The Sino-Portuguese Treaty of Peking in 1887 clearly established Macau's legal status as a Portuguese colony, providing certainty that encouraged further development. By the 20th century, the urban area of Macau had expanded to encompass the entire peninsula. The total land area of Macau in 1912 was 11.6 square kilometres (4.5 sq mi). That year saw the start of new port works, including significant land reclamation. Some material for reclamation was obtained by dredging the highly silted port. From 1919 to 1925, about 0.95 square kilometres (0.37 sq mi) of land was reclaimed, and reclamation in the northeast and northwest continued until the Second World War. A plan to develop coastal areas in the northeast, including the outer harbour, was implemented from 1923 to 1931. By 1927, the peninsula had effectively doubled in size. The reclamation of Fai Chi Kei was finished in 1933. Expansions of seawalls created new land, and new piers were created to expand shipping. From 1930, more land was also created near the Governor's residence.

The very shallow waters between the two islands of Taipa, already naturally accruing sediment through siltation, were reclaimed in 1919 to fully unite the islands. Taipa island was expanded from 1.3 square kilometres (0.50 sq mi) in 1919 to 3.48 square kilometres (1.34 sq mi) in 1927, while Coloane went from 5.61 square kilometres (2.17 sq mi) in 1910 to 6.66 square kilometres (2.57 sq mi) in 1927.

Systematic reclamation in the early 20th century was helped by increasing immigration from China, which provided a source of cheap labour. Reclamation planned in 1927 saw the construction of new harbour walls, as well as further expansion in the north of the peninsula. A bridge to Taipa and a more open border with China also reduced some pressure on existing land. However, the population continued to grow, especially during the Second World War as refugees fled from China.

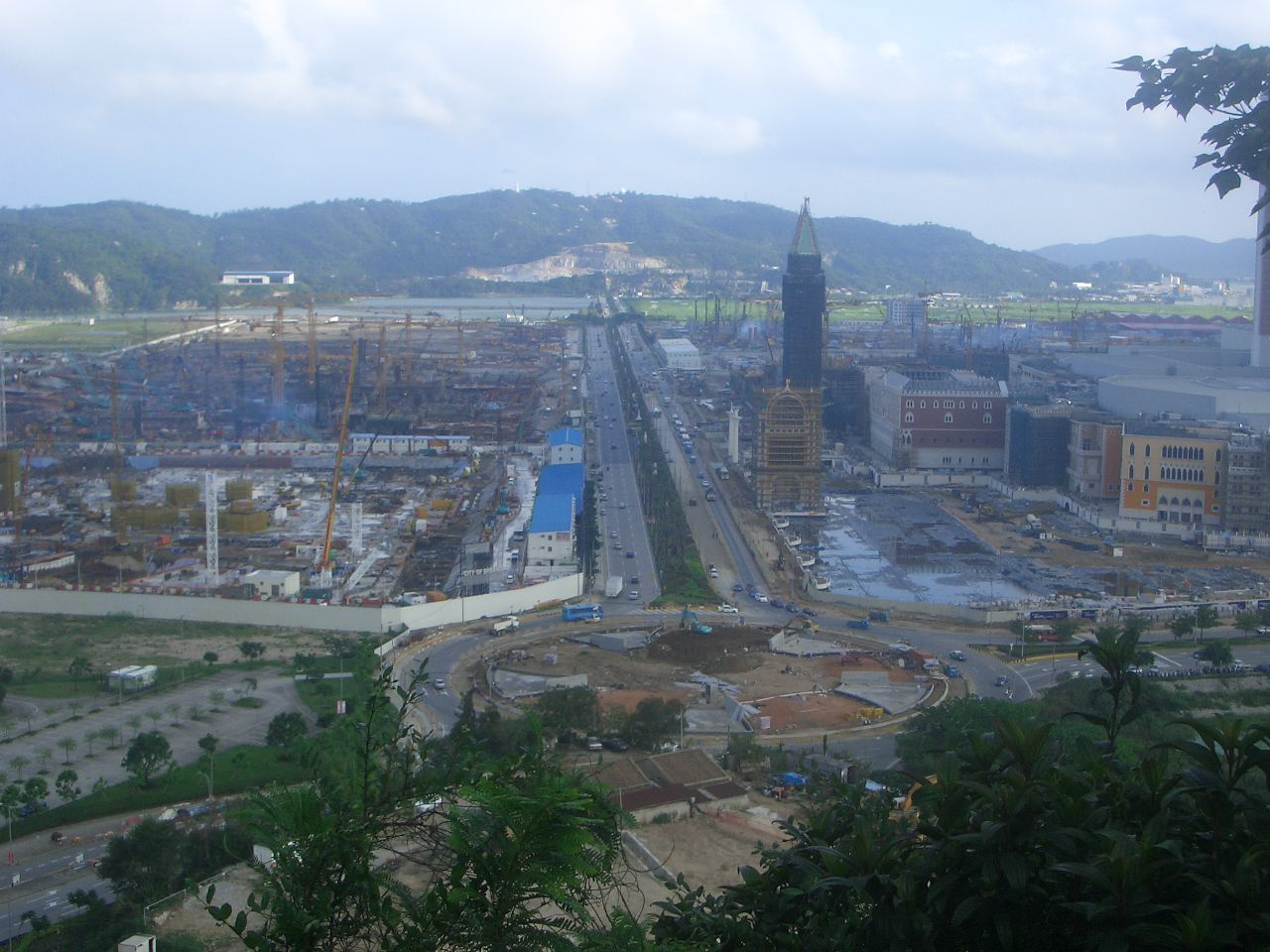
The Estrada do Istmo in 2007, with the reclaimed Cotai under development on both sides

By 1949, 40% of the peninsula was reclaimed land, which represented 14% of Macau's total land area. An economic downturn following the Second World War likely halted land expansion efforts, with no government records of reclamation taking place from 1949 to 1984. However, the Estrada do Istmo causeway was built in the 1960s, connecting Taipa and Coloane. However, a small number of small-scale projects occurred in the peninsula, and some reclamation may also have taken place in 1964 in southwest Taipa. The pause in land reclamation was likely due to a combination of factors, including a poor relationship with China, the Portuguese Colonial War, and the Carnation Revolution. Existing land, however, continued to be developed.

=== 1980s boom ===
The establishment of diplomatic relations between Portugal and China in 1979 eventually led to further economic growth and spurred a new wave of land reclamation. This stemmed from proposals made in 1982, arguing that expansion might reduce traffic congestion and improve the heavily silted waterfront. Macau's land area in 1984 was about 15.5 square kilometres (6.0 sq mi). A 1984 proposal led to a 144-by-72-metre (472 ft × 236 ft) rectangle reclaimed in the former port. Reclaimed land was used to relocate the Outer Harbour Ferry Terminal. More reclamations around the peninsula were used to create residential and commercial space.

1986 saw reclamation take place on the northern shores of both islands to the south. Coloane expanded during this time from 5.61 square kilometres (2.17 sq mi) to 7.09 square kilometres (2.74 sq mi). This came alongside a second bridge from the Macau Peninsula to Taipa, more closely integrating the territory. By 1987, 54% of the peninsula was reclaimed land, and 33% of all land was reclaimed. While reclamation in the early 20th century did come with planning, development could be slow and some plans were altered or not adopted. Contrasting with this, the land reclamation projects of the 1980s had legally enforceable land use plans that determined how the new land would be used, down to the architectural styles of new buildings. By 1992, Macau had expanded to 18.7 square kilometres (7.2 sq mi).

A competition to design a reclamation plan for Praia Grande in the southwest of the Macau Peninsula resulted in a proposal that in addition to slightly expanding Praia Grande itself used causeways to create two artificial fresh water lakes. A triangular artificial island separating the two was connected by road to the rest of the peninsula. The creation of these lakes in part aims to preserve the original view of the Praia Grande bay as it would historically have been seen from the sea. This project created 1.9 square kilometres (0.73 sq mi) of land.

A large project saw 5.2 square kilometres (2.0 sq mi) of land created on either side of the Estrada do Istmo between Taipa and Coloane. The two islands were completely connected by this reclaimed land, with the new area referred to as Cotai. Land was separately reclaimed to build the Macau International Airport to the east of the islands, with both the terminal and runway fully situated on reclaimed land. The airport was initially reclaimed as a separate island, connected to Taipa by bridges. It opened in November 1995. Reclamation of west Cotai and the airport took place from 1989 to 1995, while east Cotai was reclaimed from 1995 to 2005. Following this, Macau covered 30.4 square kilometres (11.7 sq mi): 9.3 square kilometres (3.6 sq mi) in the Macau Peninsula, 7.6 square kilometres (2.9 sq mi) each in Taipa and Coloane, and 5.9 square kilometres (2.3 sq mi) in Cotai.

=== Post-handover ===
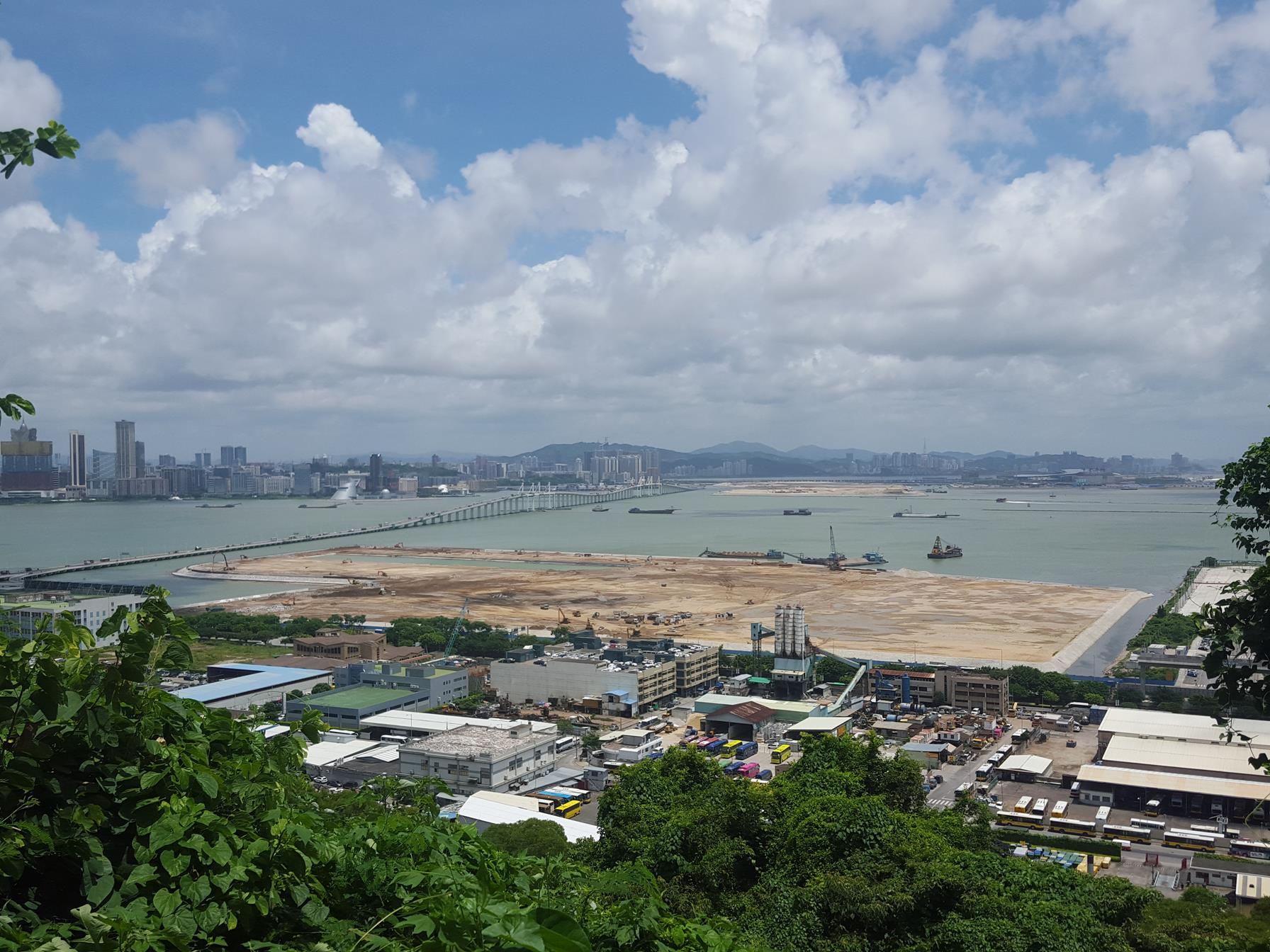
The reclamation of portion E1 of the Macau New Urban Zone in 2017, looking from Taipa along the Amizade Bridge to the Macau Peninsula.

Following the handover of Macau from Portugal to China in 1999, Chinese government funding was available for new land reclamation projects. However, new proposals required approval by the State Council of China, as well as the Macau government, and went through a more rigorous assessment process. Legal changes meant newly reclaimed land no longer became private property, but state property. Projects shifted mostly to infilling or small extensions from the existing coastline.

One large-scale initiative was the Macau New Urban Zone, which saw a large island built to the east of the Macau Peninsula, new land planned south of the peninsula, and four small areas planned north of Taipa. The development of the Macau New Urban Zone included pre-existing plans for how each new area of land was intended to be utilised. The total planned area of these six reclamations is 5 square kilometres (1.9 sq mi), which, if completed, would bring overall land area to 35.5 square kilometres (13.7 sq mi). The construction of the Hong Kong–Zhuhai–Macau Bridge included a new island east of the Macau Peninsula, which lies partially within Macau's jurisdiction. From 2000 to 2020, land reclamation extended the length of Macau's coastline from 40 kilometres (25 mi) to 76 kilometres (47 mi).

In 2015, Macau's maritime territory was expanded to 85 square kilometres (33 sq mi), which raised the question of whether more land reclamation was wanted. Proposals for new development include a new ring road around the Macau Peninsula, and a new island south of Coloane. However, it is unclear how much reclamation is possible, with some estimates suggesting only a further 8 square kilometres (3.1 sq mi) of land might be feasibly created. A plan to expand the airport through reclamation was approved in October 2024. The government plans to create a landfill island south of Coloane, modelled off Singapore's Pulau Semakau.

== Impact ==
Macau's land reclamation has occurred alongside a significant expansion of its urban area. There has also been large-scale land reclamation in neighbouring regions.

Land reclamation has provided space for new civil projects, such as the airport and ferry terminal. The purpose of newly reclaimed land was often linked to economic development. Some land reclaimed in the 1960s and 1970s was used to support manufacturing. As manufacturing weakened from the 1990s, development shifted to tourism and gambling, notably through the creation of Cotai. Land reclaimed after this gambling period has had more mixed use, created with more public areas and as part of an effort to shift the economy away from gambling. The Macau University of Science and Technology and Macau East Asian Games Dome were also constructed on reclaimed land part of or near Cotai.

The incremental land reclamation process has left infrastructure somewhat fragmented. Road systems in Macau are considered inefficient, often reflecting the needs of the territory prior to land reclamation, with roads on reclaimed land being added after the original system had been developed. The urban design, including the density of buildings and the size of roads, often reflects the period in which the land was added to the city.

In total, land reclamation has effectively doubled the size of the Macau Peninsula, and tripled the overall land area. This changing land area has reflected a changing economy, with Cotai in particular being central to the gambling industry. While the new land has been heavily developed, green spaces on the original Taipa and Coloane have been preserved.

Reclamation has destroyed much of Macau's natural wetlands, and has led to some saltwater intrusion. Land reclamation in the nearby Hongwan Waterway has also led to a decrease in Macau's water quality. The commercial fishing industry sharply contracted, dropping from over 800 vessels in the 1980s to 100 in the 1990s. Reclamation south of Coloane has received opposition due to potential further damage to Indo-Pacific humpback dolphin habitat. The coastline has become more irregular, which significantly affects coastal water flow. The government has sought to preserve some of the remaining wetlands. Land reclamation in the 21st century has increased the amount of urban green space, especially in the Taipa-Cotai-Coloane area. Much of this green development has been designed to capture rainwater, increasing the city's access to fresh water.
