= East line (Macau Light Rapid Transit) =

Light rail in Macau

Overview
- Status: Under construction
- Owner: Macau
- Locale: Macau, China
- Termini: Border Gate; Taipa Ferry Terminal
- Stations: 7

Service
- Type: Rapid transit
- System: Macau Light Rapid Transit
- Services: 1
- Operator(s): MTR (Macau)

History
- Planned opening: 2029

Technical
- Line length: 7.7 km (4.78 mi)
- Number of tracks: 2
- Character: Underground

The East line (Chinese: 澳氹東線, Portuguese: Linha Leste) is a line of the Macau Light Rapid Transit currently under construction. The East line is planned to run entirely underground, constructed with a tunnel-boring machine, excluding the section between ES6 station (Zone E1 of New Area station) and Taipa Ferry Terminal station The line will provide a through service from the existing terminus of the Taipa line at Taipa Ferry Terminal, and traverse Zone E1 of the Macau New Urban Zone, stopping in the centre of the zone. It will then cross under the Praia Grande to the southern end of New Urban Zone A. The track will run under the central greenway of zone A, stopping at 3 stations there. Finally, it will run underwater, along the coast of the Macau peninsula, stopping at stations at Areia Preta and Portas do Cerco. The line will be 7.7 km long.

Construction started in August 2023 by a joint venture led by China Civil Engineering Construction Corporation. The line is expected to be completed by 2028 and to open in 2029.

== Stations ==
Station No.	Station name			Connections	Distance km	Freguesia/Zone
Station No.	English	Chinese	Portuguese	Connections	Distance km	Freguesia/Zone
ES1	Border Gate	關閘	Portas do Cerco			Freguesia de Nossa Senhora de Fátima
ES2	Pearl of the Orient	東方明珠	Perola Oriental			Freguesia de Nossa Senhora de Fátima
ES3	New Urban Zone Area A North	新城A區北	Norte do Zona A dos Novos Aterros			Freguesia de Nossa Senhora de Fátima
ES4	New Urban Zone Area A Central	新城A區中	Central da Zona A dos Novos Aterros			Freguesia de Nossa Senhora de Fátima
ES5	New Urban Zone Area A South	新城A區南	Sul do Zona A dos Novos Aterros			Freguesia de Nossa Senhora de Fátima
ES6	New Urban Zone E1	新城E1區	Zona E1 dos Novos Aterros	Taipa Northern Link		Freguesia de Nossa Senhora do Carmo
ST23	Taipa Ferry Terminal	氹仔碼頭	Terminal Maritimo da Taipa	Taipa		Freguesia de Nossa Senhora do Carmo

== Proposed Extensions ==
A westward extension of the East Line, parallel to the West Line section of Macau LRT, is proposed to extend the Border Gate station to Ilha Verde station, planned to be located at the plaza nearby the Qingmao Port.

Station No.	Station name			Connections	Distance km	Freguesia/Zone
Station No.	English	Chinese	Portuguese	Connections	Distance km	Freguesia/Zone
ES0	Ilha Verde	青洲	Ilha Verde	West		Freguesia de Nossa Senhora de Fátima
ES1	Border Gate	關閘	Portas do Cerco			Freguesia de Nossa Senhora de Fátima
