= Taipa =

Area in Macau

Taipa (Nossa Senhora do Carmo) 氹仔 (嘉模堂區)
- Area
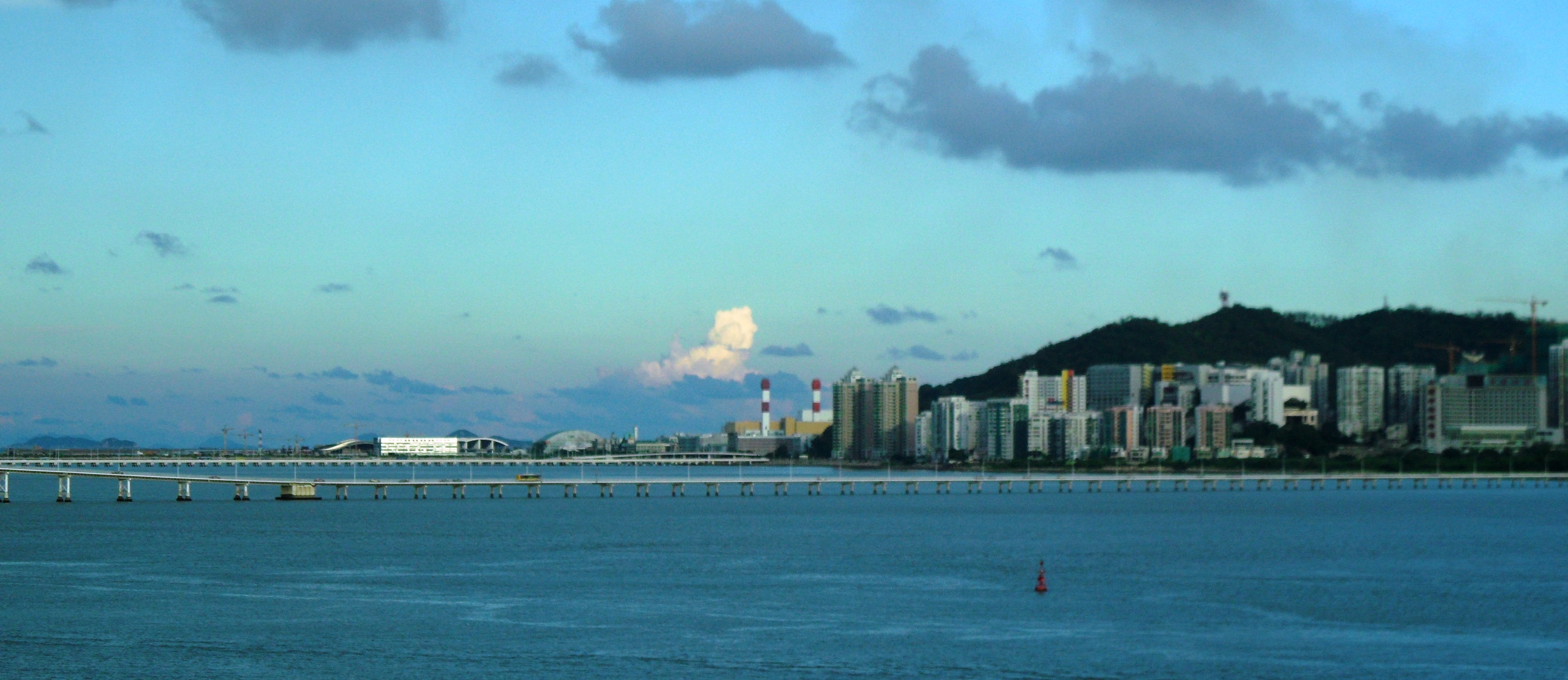
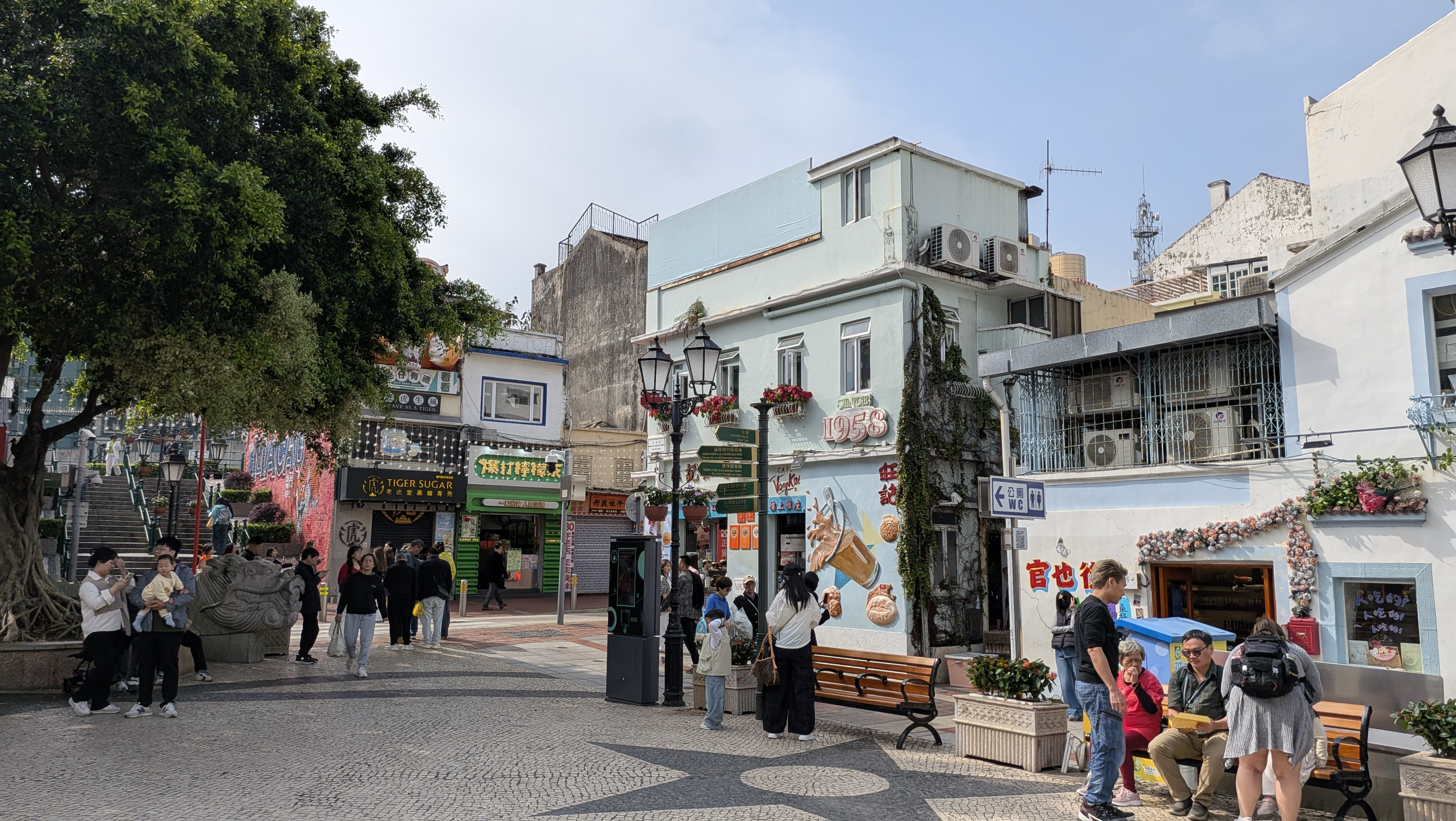
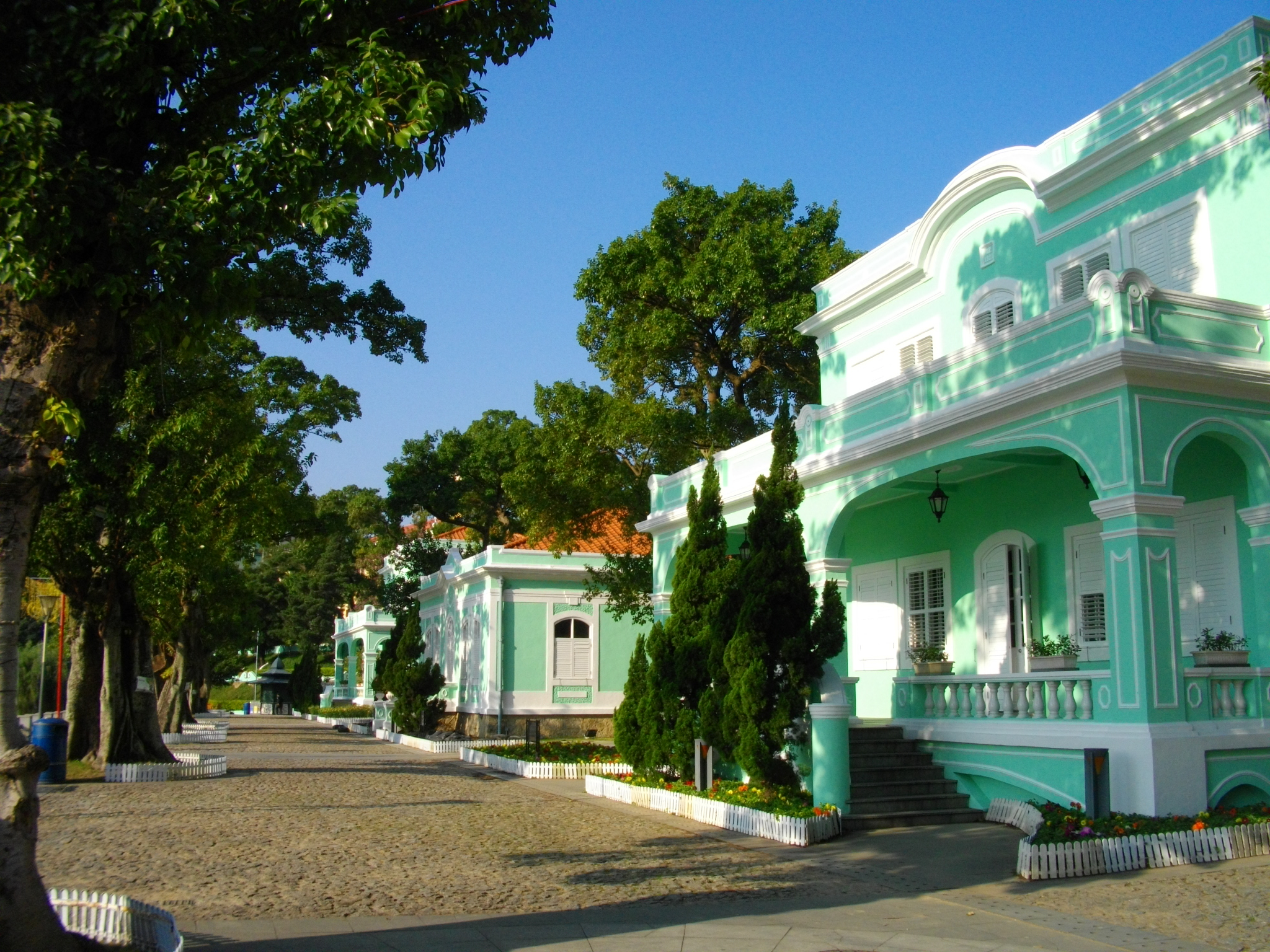
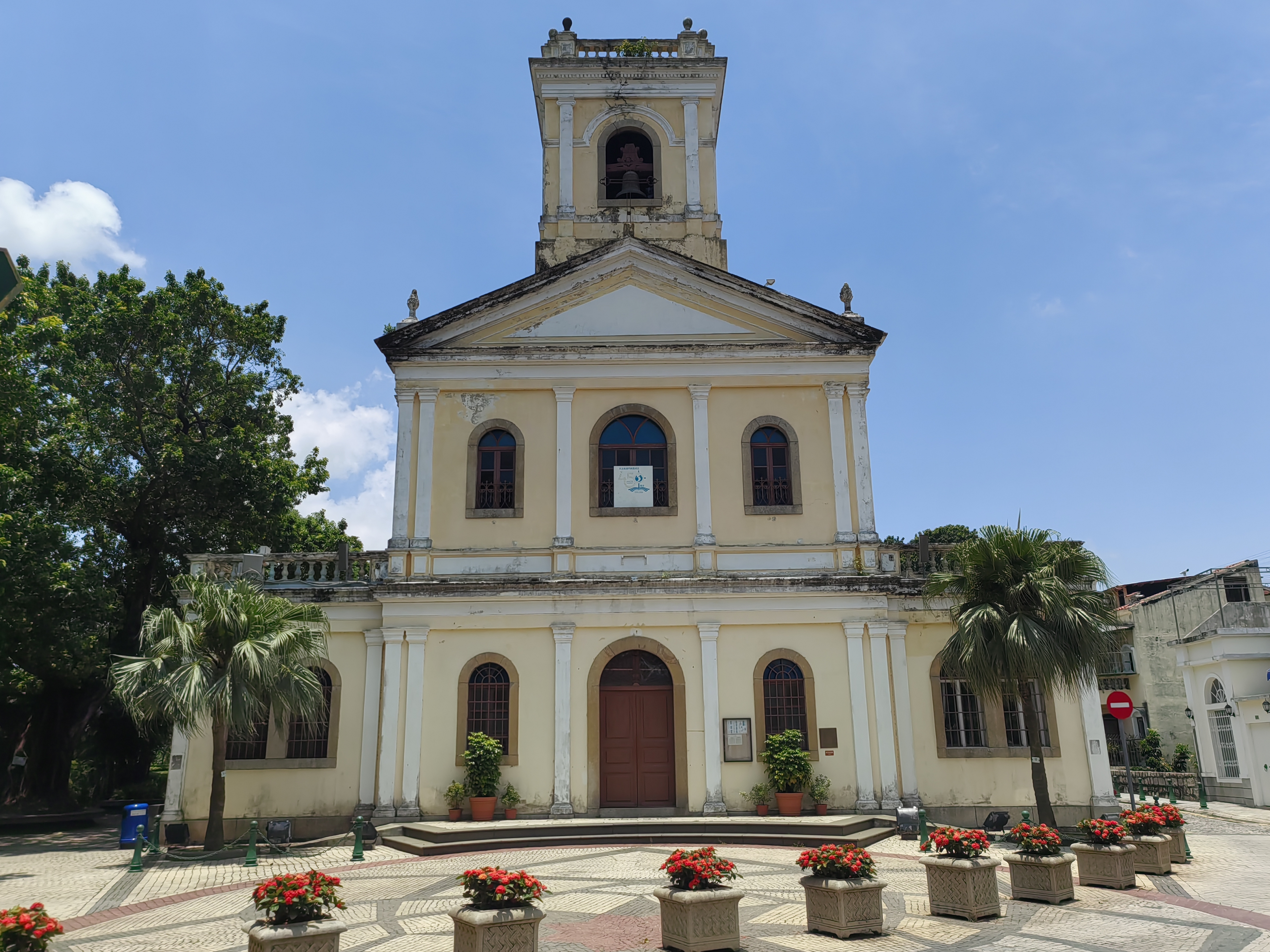
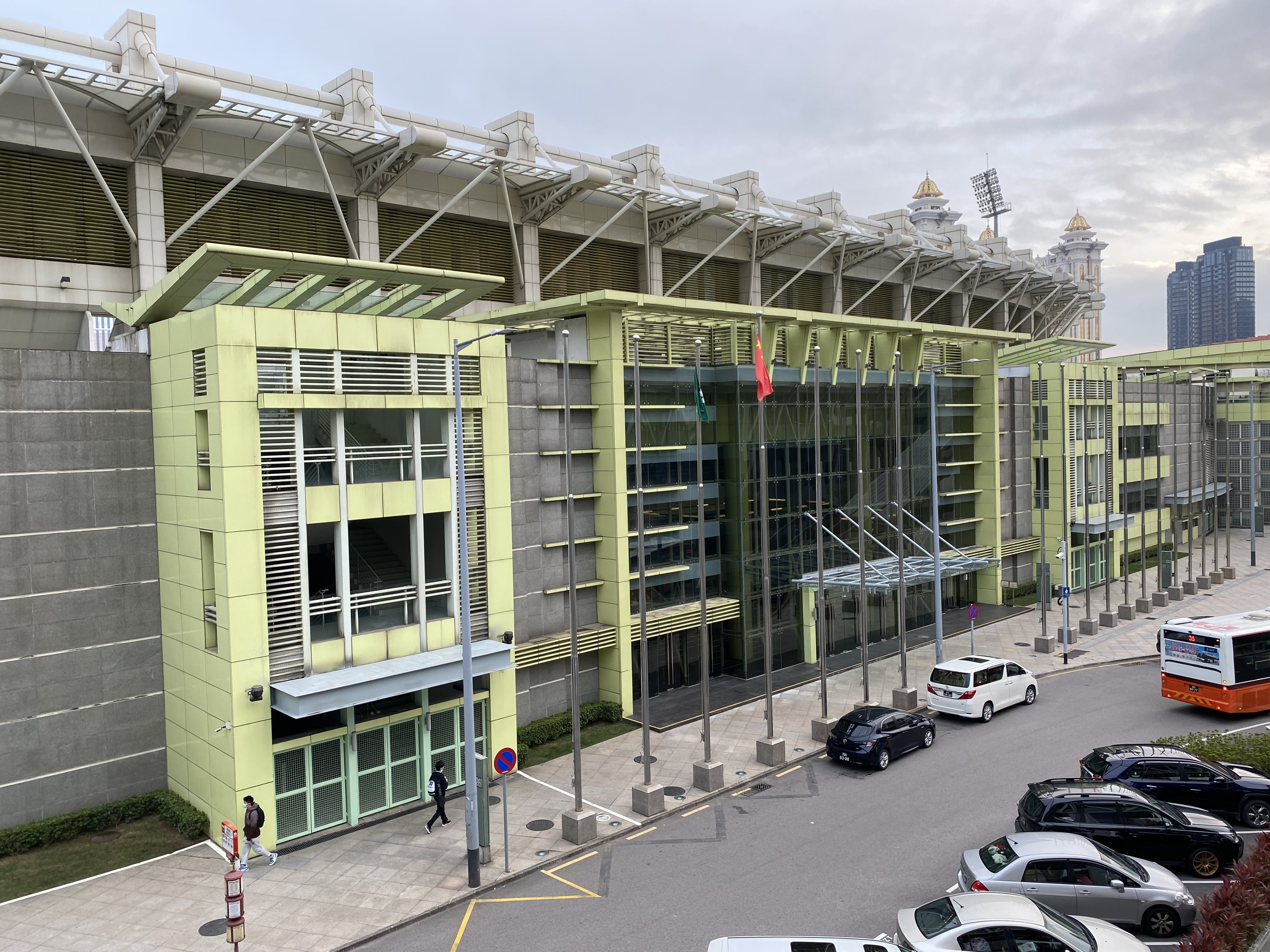
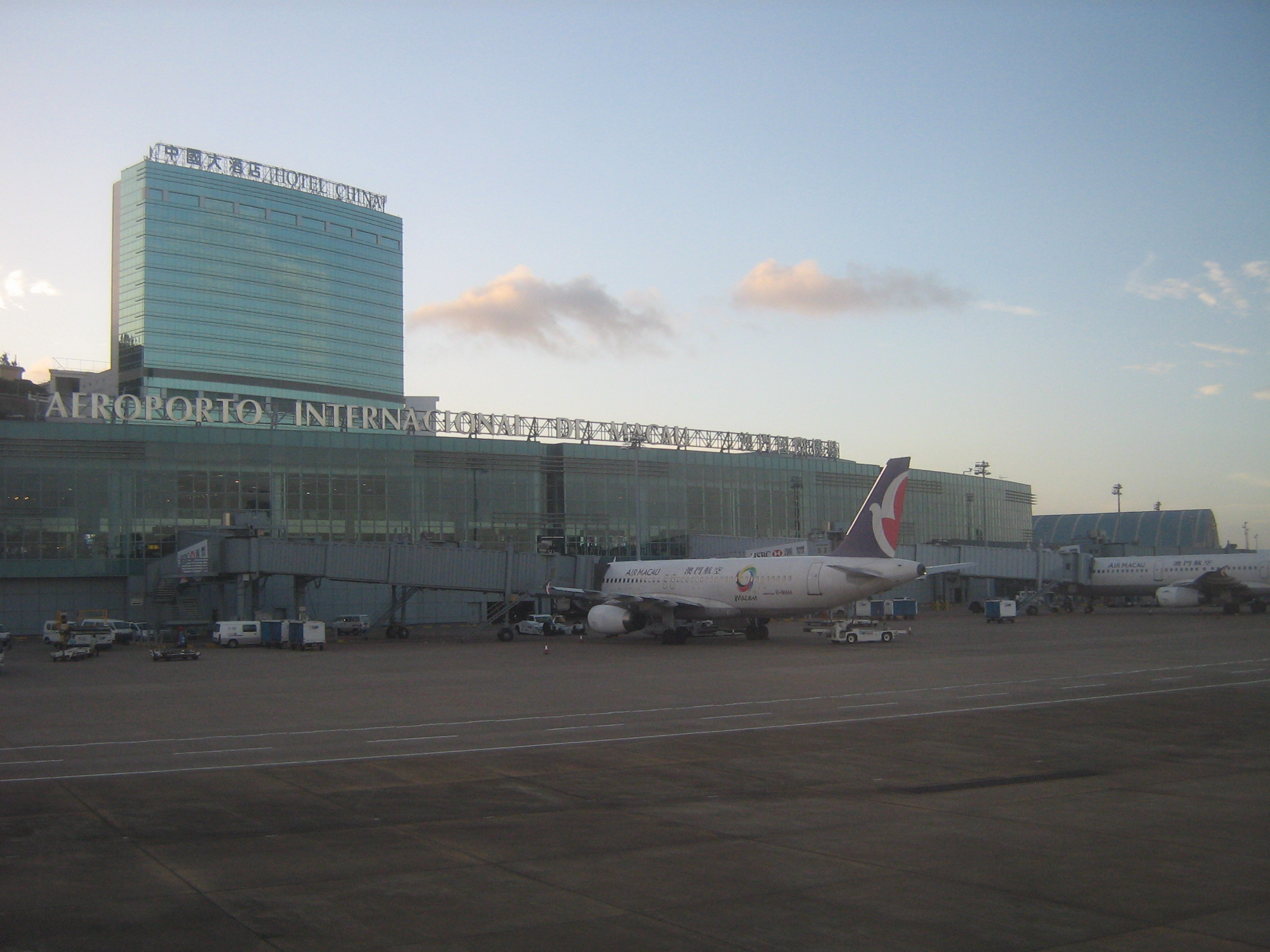
- Taipa Skyline Taipa Village Taipa Houses Museum Our Lady of Carmel Church Macau Stadium Macau International Airport Aerial view of Taipa

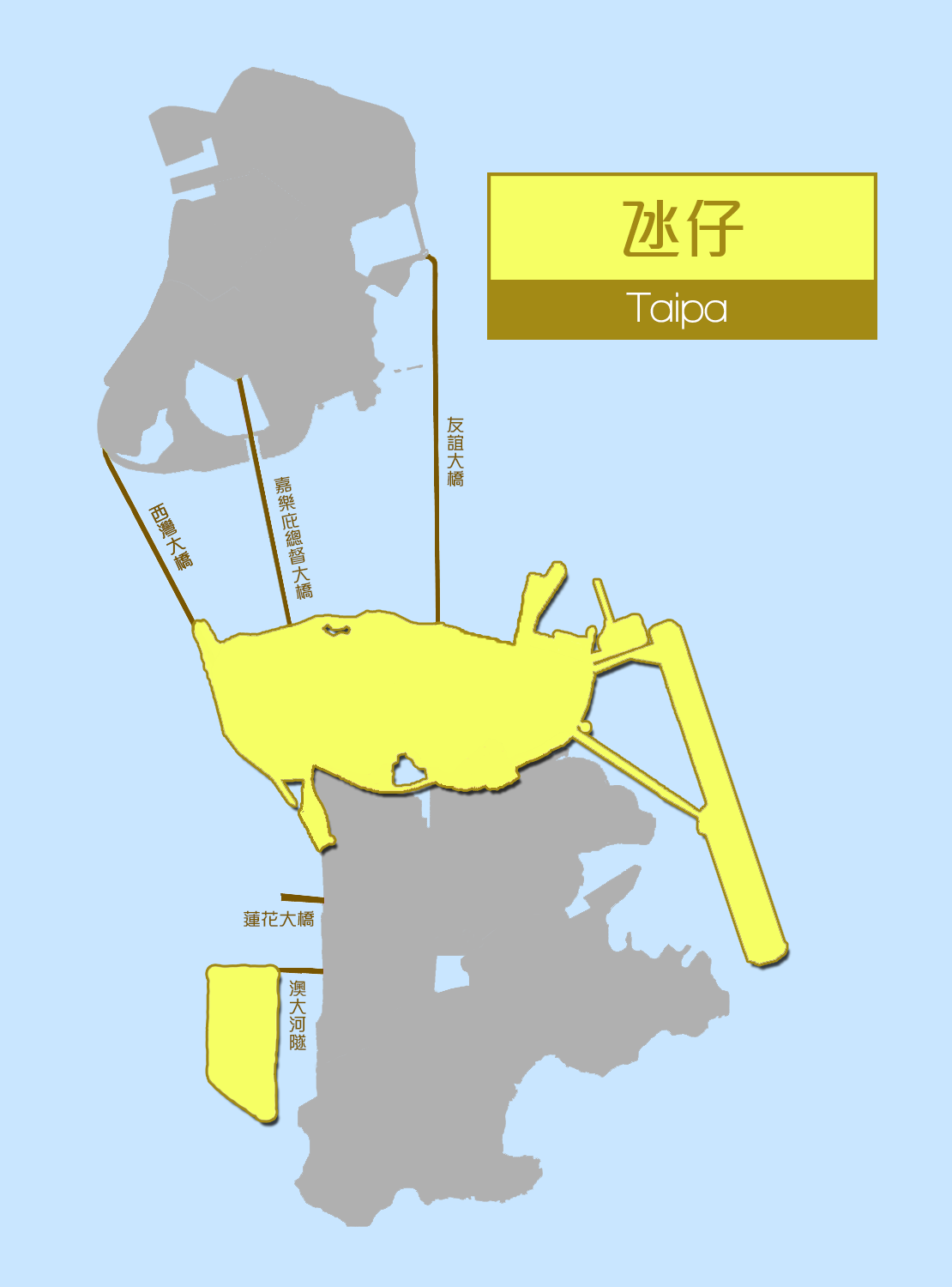
- Freguesia de Nossa Senhora do Carmo in Macau
- Coordinates: 22°9′35″N 113°33′34″E
- Country: China
- SAR: Macau
- Freguesia: Freguesia de Nossa Senhora do Carmo

Area
  - Total: 7.9 km^{2} (3.1 sq mi)

Population (2021)
  - Total: 112,051
  - Density: 14,000/km^{2} (37,000/sq mi)
- Time zone: UTC+8 (Macau Standard)

Taipa

Chinese name
- Traditional Chinese: 氹仔
- Simplified Chinese: 氹仔
- Jyutping: Tam^{5}zai^{2}
Transcriptions
Standard Mandarin
- Hanyu Pinyin: Dàngzǎi
- IPA: [tâŋtsàɪ]
Yue: Cantonese
- Yale Romanization: Táhmjái
- Jyutping: Tam^{5}zai^{2}
- IPA: [tɐ̬mtsɐ̌i]
Southern Min
- Hokkien POJ: tiap á tó

Portuguese name
- Portuguese: Taipa

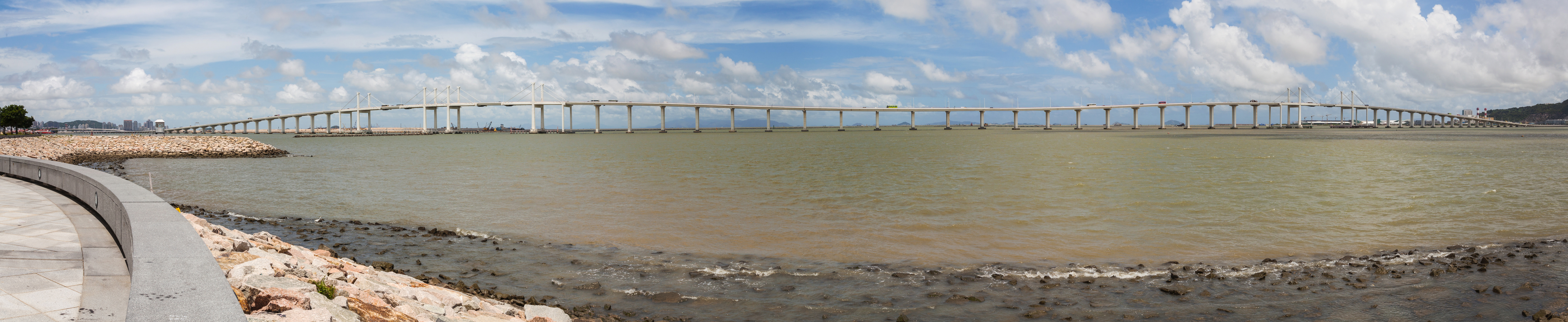
Ponte de Amizade (Friendship Bridge) from the Macau Peninsula (left) to the Taipa Island (right), Macau

Taipa (Chinese: 氹仔; Jyutping: Tam5zai2, Cantonese pronunciation: [tʰɐ̌m.t͡sɐ̌i̯]; Portuguese: Taipa, pronounced [ˈtajpɐ]) is an area in Macau, formerly a distinct island from Coloane but now connected to it through the reclaimed land of Cotai. Located on the northern half of the combined island, Taipa's population is mostly suburban. Administratively, the boundaries of the traditional civil parish Freguesia de Nossa Senhora do Carmo are mostly coterminous with that of the former Taipa Island, except for a portion of the parish that lies on the island of Hengqin (Montanha), housing the campus of the University of Macau.

== Geography ==
Taipa is 2.5 kilometres (1.6 miles) south of the Macau Peninsula and east of the island of Hengqin, which forms a part of the adjacent Chinese city of Zhuhai. The Macau International Airport, University of Macau, Macau Jockey Club and Macau Stadium are all located in Taipa.

- Area: 7.9 square kilometres (3.1 sq mi)
- Population: 112,051+ (2021)

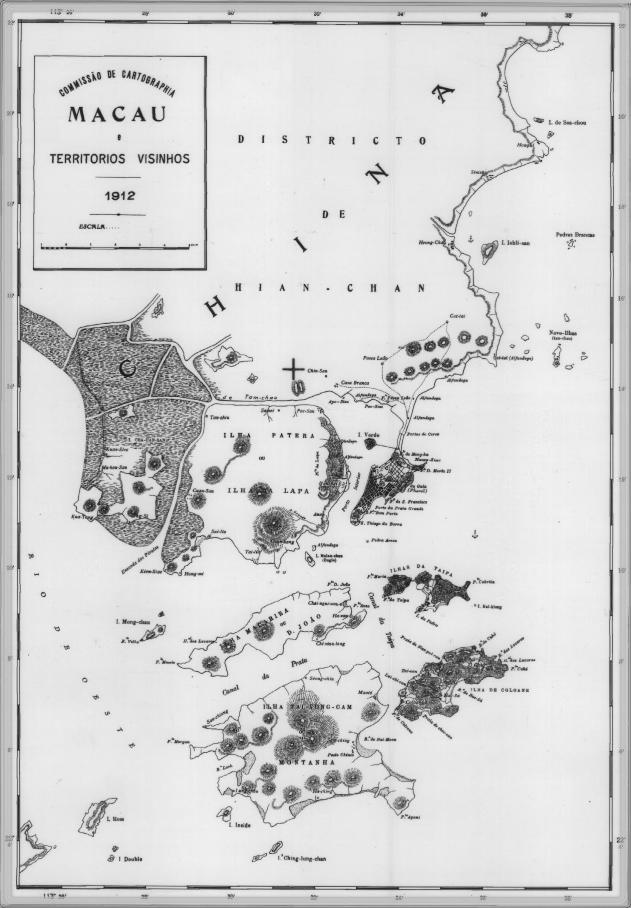
Map of Macau and its vicinity in 1912. Taipa was two islands.

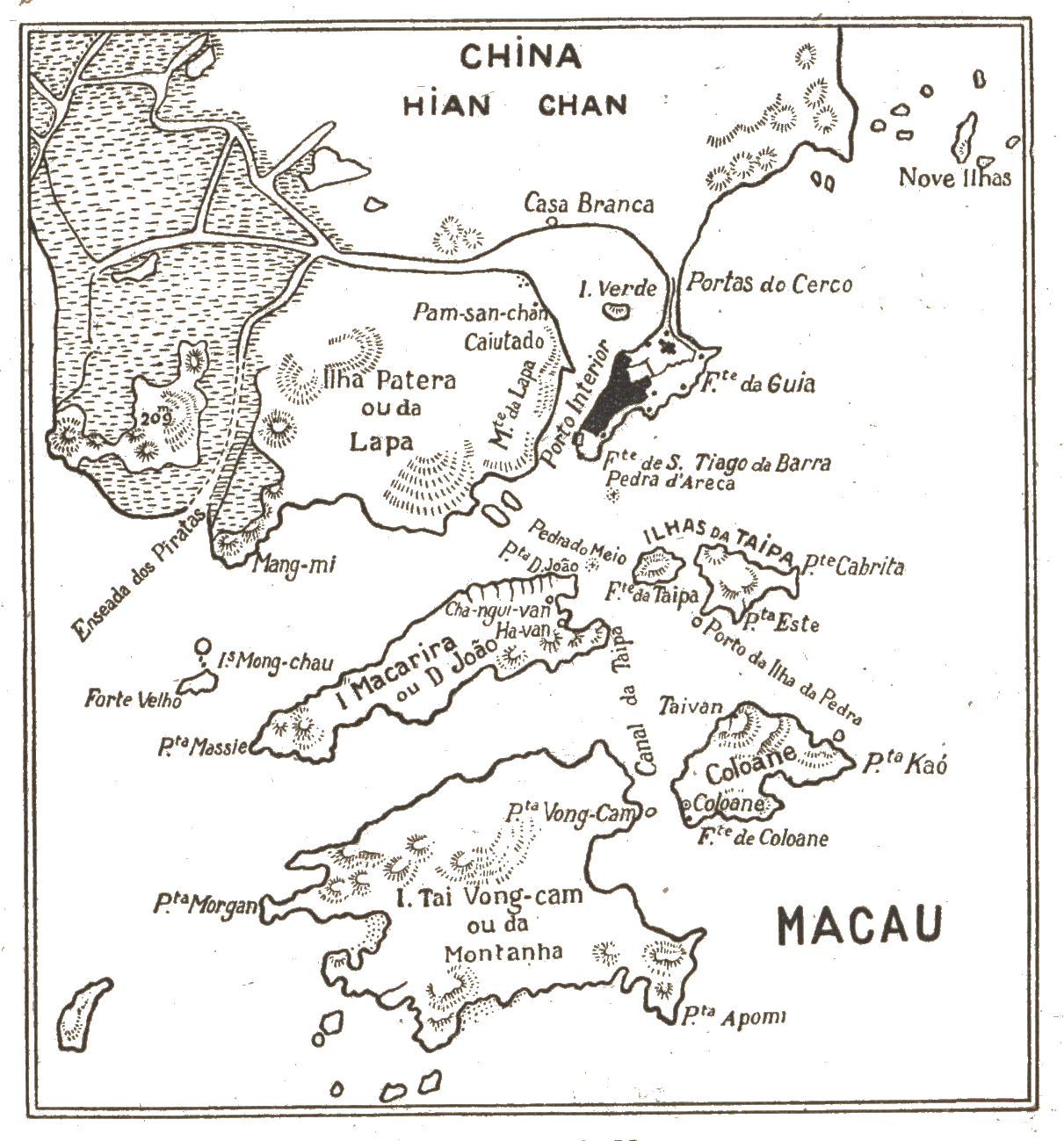
Map of Macau and its vicinity in 1936

Taipa's geography is dominated by the presence of two hills to the east and west that tower over central Taipa. The 159.1-metre (522.0-foot) Taipa Grande Hill (大潭山, Colina da Taipa Grande) lies to the east, and Taipa Pequena Hill (小潭山, Colina da Taipa Pequena) the west. This is because originally Taipa consisted of two islands with a hilly terrain - Greater Taipa and Lesser Taipa. As a result of siltation and land reclamation, by the mid-20th century central Taipa had formed, which is largely made up of flat terrain, turning Taipa into one island.

Initially, Taipa was connected to Coloane only by the Estrada do Istmo (路氹連貫公路) causeway, opened in 1969, but starting in the 1990s, land reclamation efforts created a new area, Cotai, and which is home to mega-resorts, casinos, and convention and exhibition centres, and has turned Taipa, Cotai and Coloane all into one island. Taipa is connected to the Macau Peninsula by the Governador Nobre de Carvalho Bridge, Friendship Bridge and the Sai Van Bridge.

Taipa is an urbanised, suburban area primarily home to housing, with several housing complexes, which are mostly upscale. As a new town of Macau, Taipa has better city planning than the Macau Peninsula, with wide streets set around a grid system, however Macau has historically centred around the peninsula and some choose to live on the Macau Peninsula because most famous schools are there.

In 2015 the body of the director general of Macao Customs Service, Lai Minhua, was found in the district.

== History ==
Originally an island pair on the southern end of the Praia Grande, Taipa was first settled by Hokkien-speaking fishermen around 800 years ago. Most Chinese settlement of Taipa occurred during the Southern Song dynasty. In 1847, encouraged by the governorship of João Maria Ferreira do Amaral, who sought to expand Portugal's influence over Macau and affirm its sovereignty, Lesser Taipa was annexed by the Portuguese, constructing Taipa Fortress upon the command of Pedro Jose da Silva Loureiro to combat marine outlaws and protect Macau against the attack of pirates. By 1851, Portugal had also annexed Greater Taipa. These annexations formed part of a wider project by Portugal to turn Macau into a fully-fledged colony and expanding the colony's area to include Taipa, Ilha Verde, Coloane and portions of Hengqin (Montanha). The annexation also aimed to resolve the problem of the divided harbour on the Peninsula and provide land, water supply and protection for the port.

Taipa's main industry historically was fishing, with a prominent harbour where fishermen congregated. In 1923, Taipa saw its first firecracker factory open, which encouraged a boom in the firecracker industry in Taipa, especially as colonial officials limited firecracker factories on the Peninsula because of safety concerns following an accident in 1925 that killed 100 people. Many firecracker factories opened, which encouraged people to flock to the island. By 1969, as the Portuguese colonial government sought to improve Macau's infrastructure, a causeway (Estrada do Istmo) opened connecting Taipa to Coloane, and in 1974 Taipa got its first connection to the Macau Peninsula, the Governador Nobre de Carvalho Bridge, named after the city's governor between 1966 and 1974. Taipa's population, like Coloane, began to expand significantly as better infrastructure was built, increasing from originally 3,000 residents. By the mid-1980s, the firecracker industry in Taipa had declined and the last factory closed in 1984. Starting in the 1990s, Taipa's old village developed as a tourist destination as its Portuguese architecture attracted tourists and further infrastructure was constructed on the island, including the opening of the Macau International Airport in 1995.

== The names of Taipa ==
In Cantonese, Taipa has been known by many names over time, including 龍環 (Lung Waan, meaning "Dragon Ring"), 雞頸 (Gai Geng/Kaikião/Kai Kiong, "Chicken's neck"), 潭仔 (Taam Jai, "Pool"), and 龍頭環 (Lung Tau Waan, "Dragon's-Head Ring").

The Portuguese name "Taipa" comes from the Chinese pronunciation of 氹仔 in Min Nan /tiap-á/ (similar to "tiamp-a") then became "Taipa". Both the character 氹 and the alternative form 凼 mean 'cesspit', but only used in relation to Taipa in Standard Chinese today. The character 氹, or 凼 (often used in mainland Chinese texts), is often missing from mobile phone and computer input systems.

Another origin of the name, according to local legend, comes from an exchange between early Portuguese settlers on Taipa and the local Chinese. The Portuguese asked the Chinese the name (nome in Portuguese) of the place. The Chinese settlers were local grocery shopkeepers and spoke no Portuguese, but took the Portuguese nome for the Chinese 糯米, "sticky rice", which is pronounced similar to nome in Cantonese. Thinking the Portuguese settlers were asking if they sold sticky rice, the Chinese responded with "大把", pronounced "daai ba" in Cantonese, meaning "a lot." The Portuguese, hearing the response, took this to be the name of the place. There is, however, no historical evidence to support this story. "Taipa" is also what the Portuguese call the clay-mud, rammed into moulds, used to build mud houses in Portugal in times gone by, in recent times referred to as Rammed Earth.

== Education ==
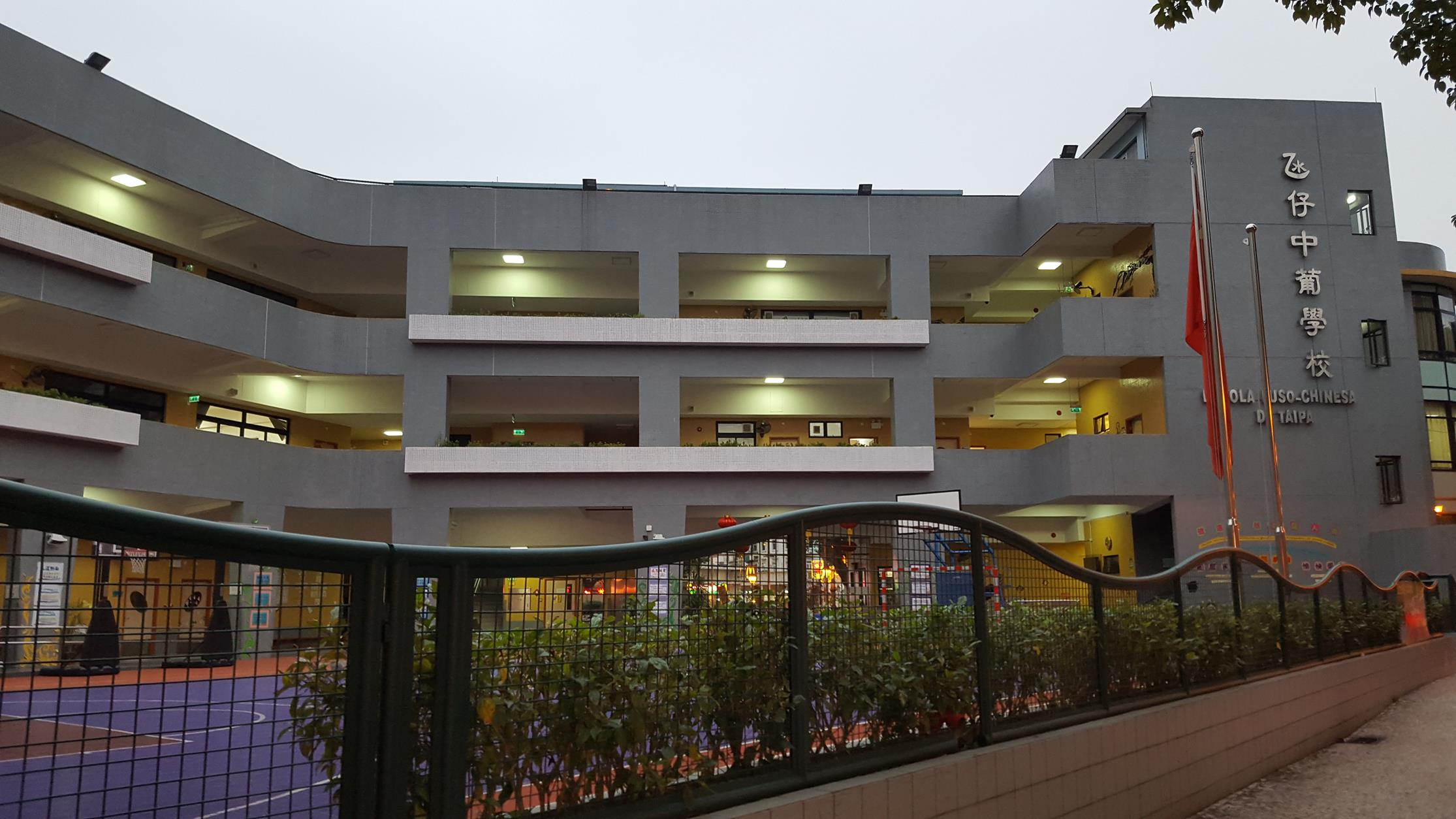
Escola Luso-Chinesa da Taipa (氹仔中葡學校)

=== Primary and secondary schools ===
Public preschool and primary school include:

- Escola Luso-Chinesa da Taipa (氹仔中葡學校) – Preschool and primary school

Private tuition-free primary and secondary schools:

- Macau Anglican College – Preschool through secondary
- Escola Cáritas de Macau (明愛學校) – Special education
- Escola Dom João Paulino – Preschool and primary school
- Fong Chong School of Taipa (Escola Fong Chong da Taipa; 氹仔坊眾學校) – Preschool through senior secondary school
- Hou Kong Middle School Macau Affiliated English School (濠江中學附屬英才學校)
- Macau Pooi To Middle School Taipa Elementary School Branch (澳培道中學氹仔小學分校)
- Pui Va Middle School (Escola Secundária Pui Va; 培華中學) – Preschool through secondary school
- Affiliated School of the University of Macau (Escola de Aplicação Anexa à Universidade de Macau; 澳門大學附屬應用學校) – Preschool through secondary

Private non-free primary and secondary schools:

- The International School of Macao – Located in Block K inside the Macau University of Science and Technology – Preschool through secondary
- School of the Nations (聯國學校; Escola das Nações) – Preschool through secondary with special education

=== Colleges and universities ===
The Macau University of Science and Technology (MUST), Macao University of Tourism, and City University of Macau are located in Taipa. University of Macau (UM), on Hengqin Island, which is part of Taipa (Nossa Senhora do Carmo), but geographically separate from Taipa.

=== Public library ===
Taipa has one public library operated by the Macao Public Library system. Taipa Library (Biblioteca da Taipa; 氹仔圖書館), which began trial operations on 15 April 2015 and opened officially on 1 September of that year, occupies 2,200 square feet (200 m^{2}) of space in the basement of Taipa Central Park (Parque Central da Taipa; 氹仔中央公園). Previously, the area was also served by another public library: the Wong Ieng Kuan Library in Taipa (Biblioteca de Wong Ieng Kuan da Taipa; 氹仔黃營均圖書館). The library, which opened in January 2005, occupied 1,080 square metres (11,600 sq ft) of space on the second and third floors of Hei Loi Tang Plaza (喜來登廣場). Its construction was funded with donations from the Wong Ieng Kuan Foundation (Fundação Wong Ieng Kuan; 黃營均基金會). The Wong Ieng Kuan Library in Taipa closed on 1 January 2022.

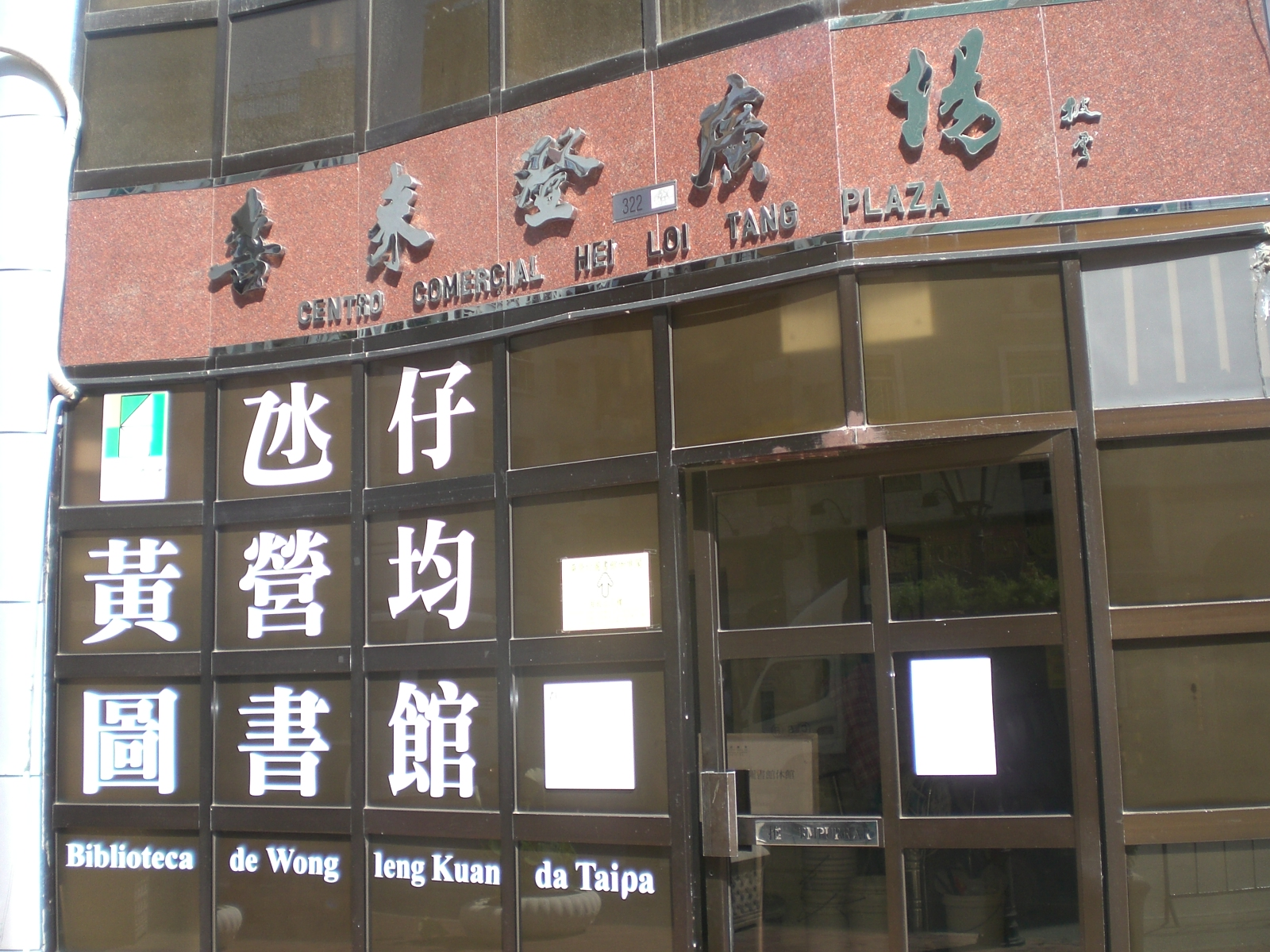
Wong Ieng Kuan Library in Taipa (2005–2022)

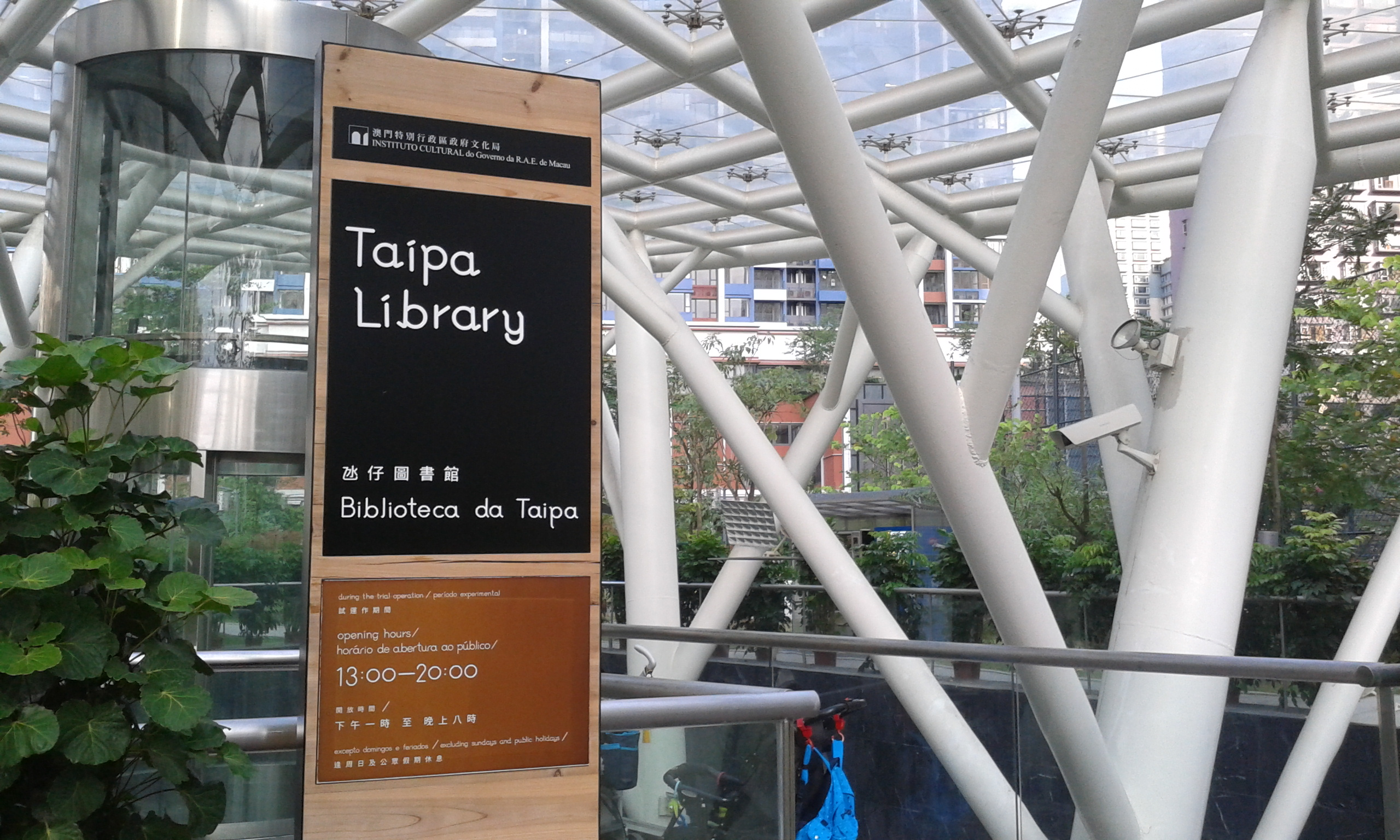
Taipa Library

== Infrastructures ==
- Macau Refuse Incineration Plant

=== Transport ===
- Macau International Airport
- Taipa Ferry Terminal
- Macau Light Rail Transit

=== Healthcare ===
Health centres operated by the Macau government in Taipa include Centro de Saúde dos Jardins do Oceano (海洋花園衛生中心), Centro de Saúde Nossa Senhora do Carmo-Lago (湖畔嘉模衛生中心), and Posto de Saúde para os Idosos Taipa (氹仔老人保健站).

Other healthcare services include:

- Macau University of Science and Technology Hospital
- Posto de Urgência das Ilhas
- Kiang Wu Hospital Taipa Medical Centre

== Tourism ==
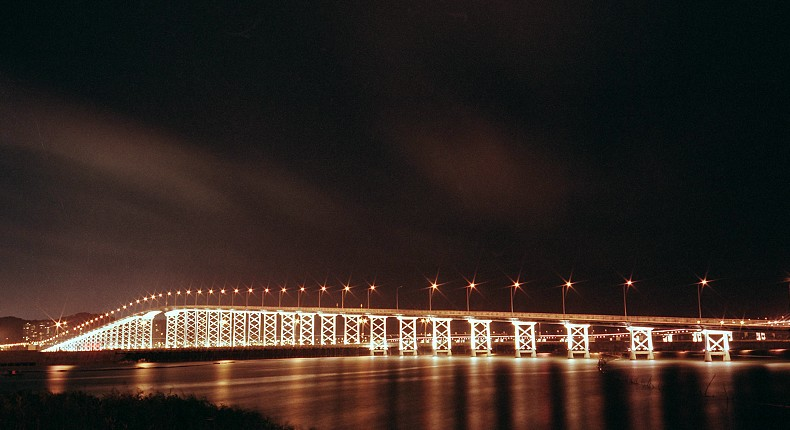
View of the Old bridge at night

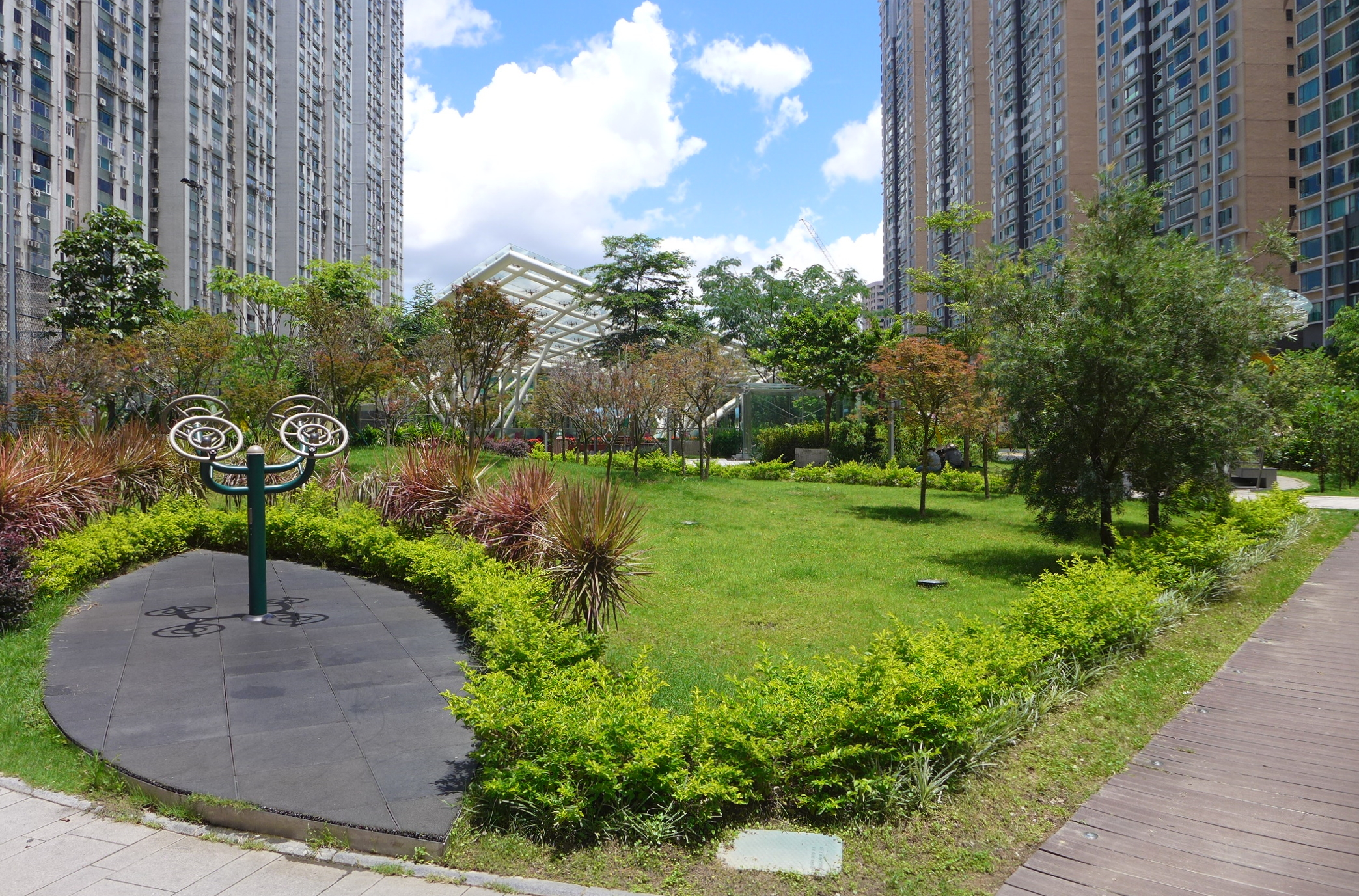
Taipa Central Park

- Altira Macau
- Cunha Street
- Macau Olympic Aquatic Centre
- Macau Stadium
- Museum of Taipa and Coloane History
- Taipa Houses–Museum
- Macau Jockey Club
- Taipa Fortress (砲台)

=== Religious ===
- Pou Tai Un Temple (菩提園 or 菩提襌院): named after bodhi tree
- Kun Yam Temple (觀音岩)
- Tin Hau Temple (天后宮)
- Sam Po Temple (三婆廟): dedicated to the elder sister of Tin Hau
- Pak Tai Temple (北帝廟): dedicated to the Taoist God of the North
- Four-faced Buddha (四面佛): invited from Thailand in 1985
- Our Lady of Carmel Church (嘉模聖母教堂): Catholic church

== See also ==
- Taipa Ferry Terminal
- List of islands and peninsulas of Macau
- East line (Macau Light Rapid Transit)
