= Taipa Houses–Museum =

Museum in Macau

Coordinates: 22.153880°N 113.559615°E

Chinese name
- Traditional Chinese: 龍環葡韻住宅式博物館
- Simplified Chinese: 龙环葡韵住宅式博物馆
Transcriptions
Standard Mandarin
- Hanyu Pinyin: Lóng Huán Pú Yùn zhùzhái shì Bówùguǎn
Yue: Cantonese
- Jyutping: lung4 waan4 pou4 wan6? zyu6 zaak6*2 sik1 bok3 mat6 gun2

Portuguese name
- Portuguese: Casas-Museu da Taipa

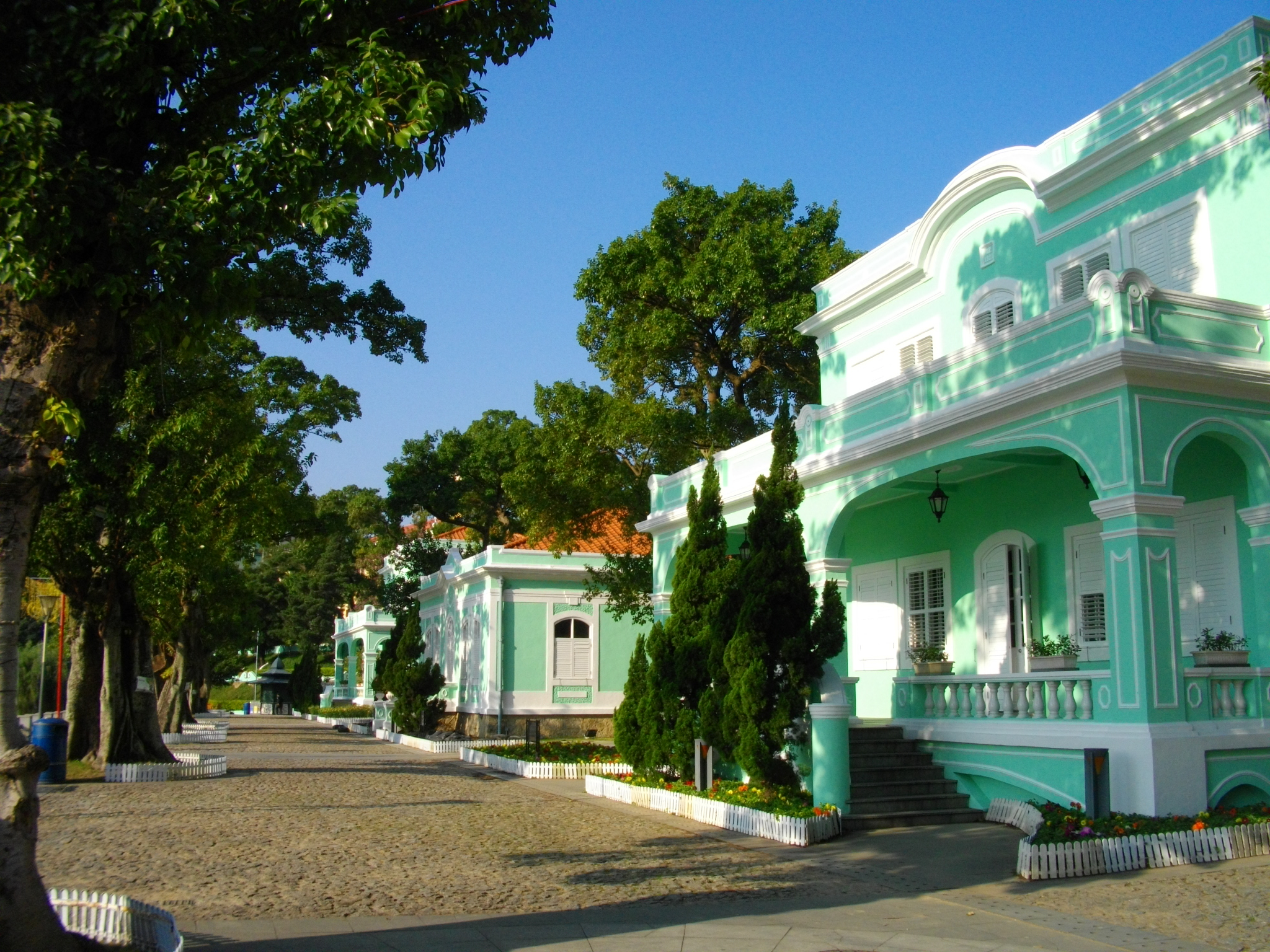
Taipa Houses Museum

The Taipa Houses–Museum (Chinese: 龍環葡韻住宅式博物館; Portuguese: Casas-Museu da Taipa) is housed in a set of old houses in Taipa, Macau, China.

The museum complex consists of five houses, of which four display various artefacts and exhibits on life during Macau's colonial era while another serves as an event venue. The houses were built in 1921. These colonial residences were restored to recreate houses of well-off Portuguese families living in Macau during the first half of the 20th century. The last house was restored in 1999. The Taipa Houses–Museum opened on 5 December 1999 and is administered by the Cultural Affairs Bureau.

The houses used to look out over the sea, but due to land reclamation of the Cotai area between Taipa and Coloane. This body of water is now a small wetland.

Every autumn, the Cultural Affairs Bureau organises the Lusofonia Festival at the open space outside the museums.

== See also ==
- List of museums in Macau
