= Our Lady of Carmel Church, Macau =

Church in Taipa, Macau, China

Our Lady of Carmel Church
- 嘉模聖母堂; Igreja de Nossa Senhora do Carmo
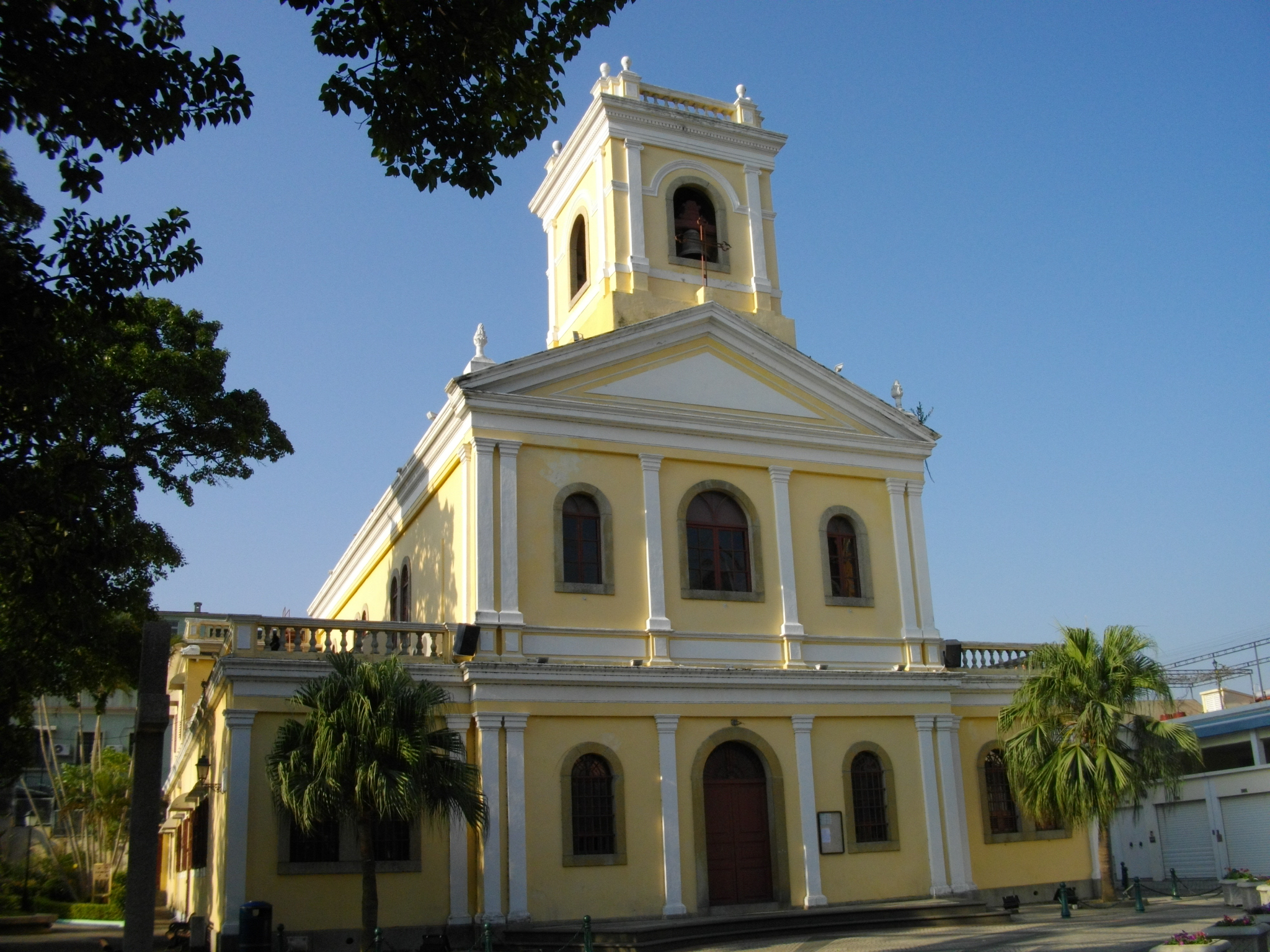
- Our Lady of Carmel Church
- 22.153539°N 113.558797°E
- Location: Taipa, Macau
- Country: China
- Denomination: Roman Catholic

History
- Status: Parish church

Architecture
- Functional status: Active
- Architectural type: Neoclassical
- Completed: 1885

Administration
- Diocese: Roman Catholic Diocese of Macau
- Parish: Our Lady of Carmel Parish

The Our Lady of Carmel Church (Chinese: 嘉模聖母堂; Portuguese: Igreja de Nossa Senhora do Carmo) is a church located on the island of Taipa, Macau, China.

== History ==
The church was built in 1885 and namesake of Our Lady of Carmel Parish.

== Architecture ==
The church's architectural style Neoclassical, but coloured wall are similar to many historic structures in Macau. The belltower of the church does not have a steeple. The church has 2,000 square feet of space and can hold up to 200.

== See also ==
- Religion in Macau
