= List of islands and peninsulas of Macau =

Overview of Macanese islands and peninsula

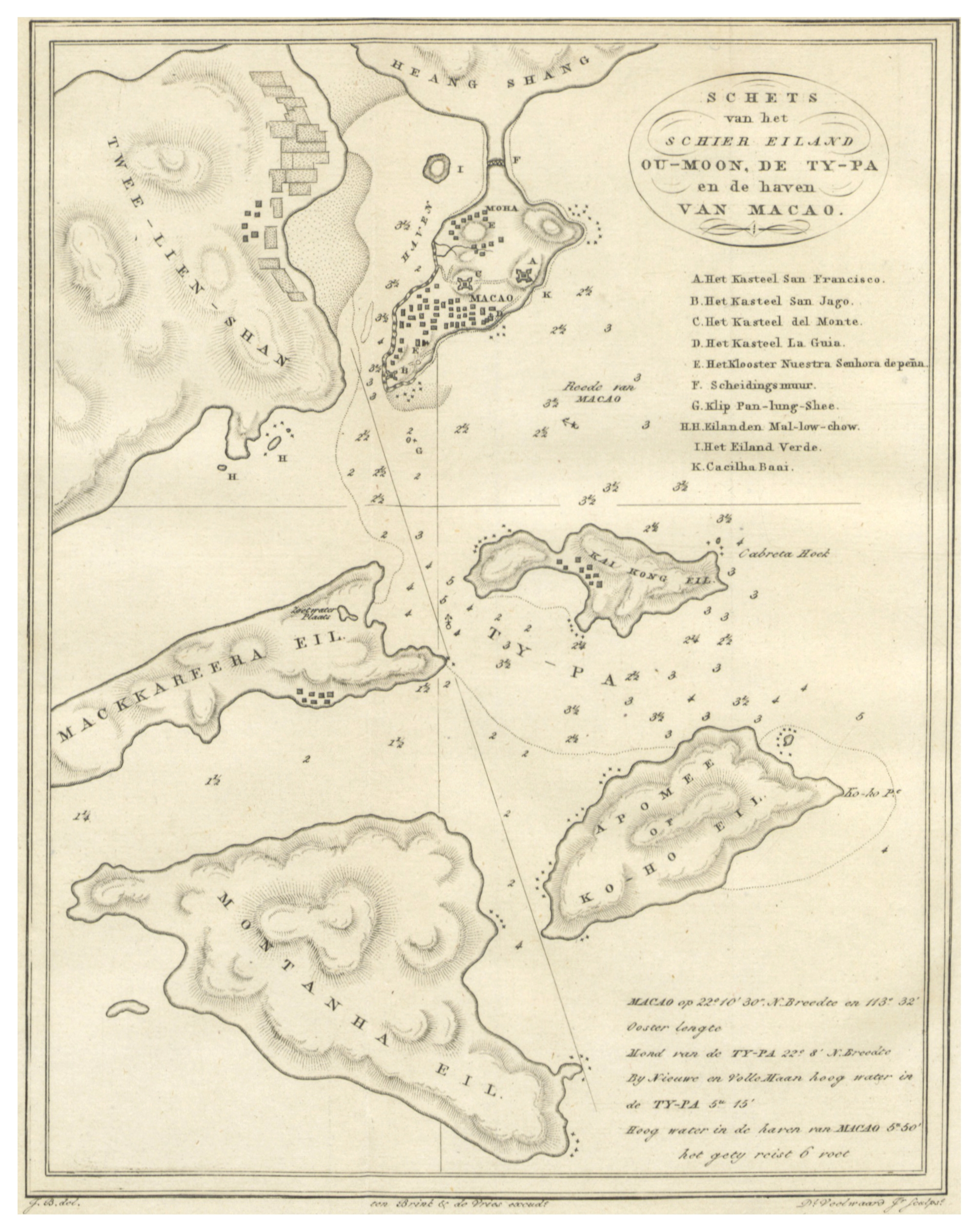
Map of Macau and its vicinity in 1836

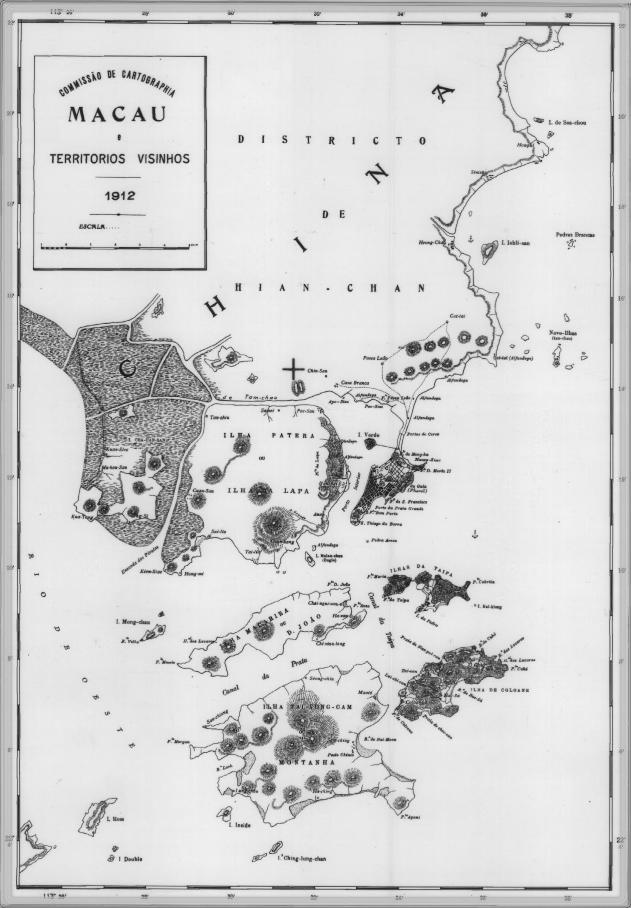
Map of Macau and its vicinity in 1912

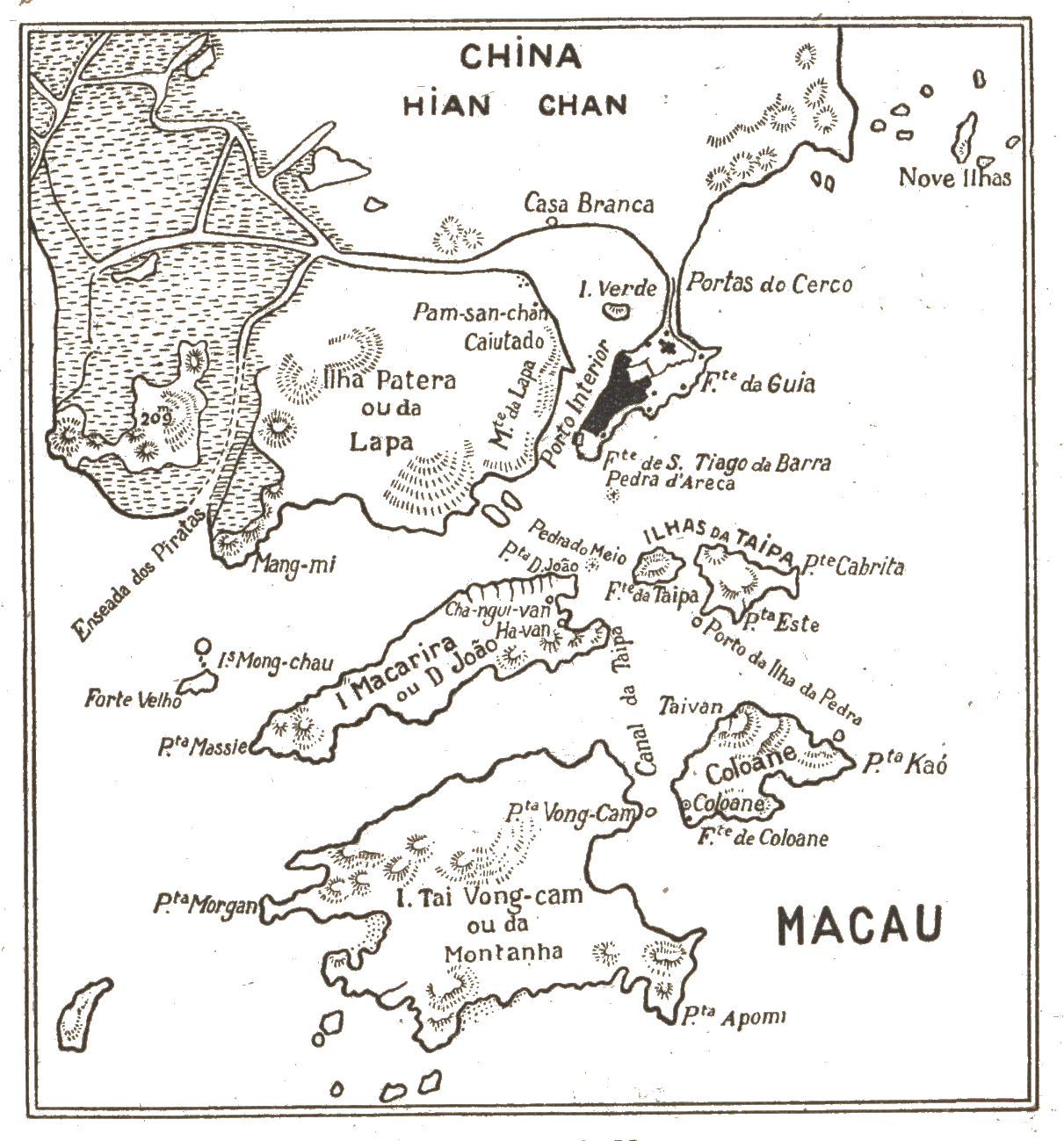
Map of Macau and its vicinity in 1936

There is one main peninsula, one main island, and several smaller peninsulas, islets, and artificial islands in the Macao Special Administrative Region. The main island is located to the south of the Macau Peninsula and to the east of Hengqin Island of the Pearl River (Zhujiang), Guangdong Province, China. The island has remained unnamed since its creation in the late 1990s, after the reclamation project of Cotai, which filled up the channel between the islands of Coloane and Taipa.

Historically, Coloane and Taipa were under the administration of the Concelho das Ilhas, which was abolished in 2001.

The Macau Peninsula was once an island in the Pearl River Delta. It has been linked to Zhongshan Island as a result of sedimentation and became a peninsula approximately two thousand years ago. Apart from this case, all of the Macanese former islands were merged either directly or indirectly with the Macau Peninsula or the newly unnamed island directly as the result of artificial land reclamation.

== Peninsulas ==
- Macau Peninsula – itself a part of Hsiang-Shan Island
- Monte Ká Hó, eastnortheastern part of Coloane
- Coloane B Power Station
- Taipa Ferry Terminal
- Ilha Verde (former island)
- Area between Lago Nam Van and Lago Sai Van on Baía da Praia Grande

== Islands ==
=== Entirely ===
- Aterro da "Zona A" dos Novos Aterros Urbanos (artificial island)
- Aterro da "Zona C" dos Novos Aterros Urbanos (artificial island)
- The island comprising Coloane, Cotai, and Taipa (main island)
- The island containing the runway and taxiways of Macau International Airport (artificial island)

=== Partly ===
- Hong Kong–Zhuhai–Macau Bridge border crossing (artificial island) – the southern part of the island is a part of Macau, containing one of Macau–Zhuhai checkpoints

==== Leased ====
- Hengqin (formerly known as Dom João e Montanha of the Lapa, Dom João, and Montanha Islands) – a part of the island is under Macanese administration as per a 40-year lease signed on 27 June 2009 between the Government of Macau and the Chinese Central Government

== Islets ==
- Centro Ecuménico Kun Iam (artificial islet)
- Islets in the Nam Van Lake
- Portas do Entendimento (artificial islet)

== Former islands ==
- Coloane Island
- Ilha Kai Kiong – connected to the apron of Macau International Airport, Taipa in 1995
- Ilha Verde – connected to the Macau Peninsula in 1895 when a causeway (now Avenida do Conselheiro Borja) was built
- Ilhéu das Lázaras – connected to the north-east of Coloane
- Ilhéu de Macau-Siac – connected to the north-east of the Macau Peninsula in January 1921, during the landfilling works for Macau's Outer Harbour expansion
- Macau Island
- Pedra d'Areca
- Taipa Island – was itself two smaller islands

== See also ==
- Geography of Macau
- List of islands and peninsulas of Hong Kong
- Lists of islands
