= Freguesia de Nossa Senhora do Carmo =

Nossa Senhora do Carmo 嘉模堂區 Our Lady of Carmel
- Freguesia
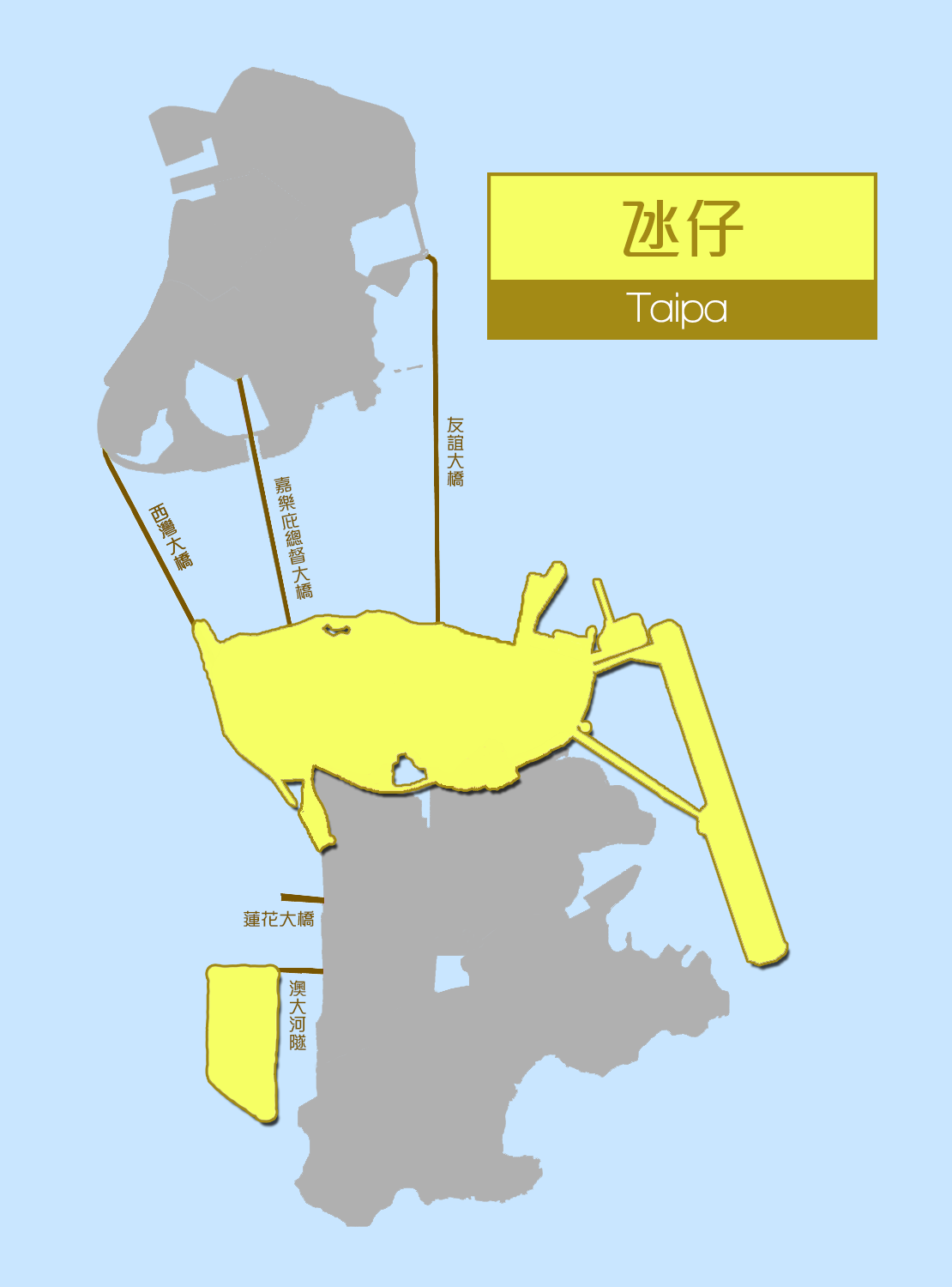
- Area of Freguesia de Nossa Senhora do Carmo
- Coordinates: 22°9′35″N 113°33′34″E
- Region: Macau (special administrative region)
- Country: People's Republic of China

Area
  - Total: 7.9 km^{2} (3.1 sq mi)

Population (2016)
  - Total: 102,759
  - Density: 13,000/km^{2} (34,000/sq mi)
- Time zone: UTC+8 (Macau Standard)

Freguesia de Nossa Senhora do Carmo

Chinese name
- Traditional Chinese: 嘉模堂區
- Simplified Chinese: 嘉模堂区
- Cantonese Yale: Gā'mòuh Tòhng Kēui
- Jyutping: Gaa1mou4 Tong4 Koei1
Transcriptions
Standard Mandarin
- Hanyu Pinyin: Jiāmú Tángqū
- IPA: [tɕjámǔ tʰǎŋtɕʰý]
Yue: Cantonese
- Yale Romanization: Gā'mòuh Tòhng Kēui
- Jyutping: Gaa1mou4 Tong4 Koei1
- IPA: [ka˥.mɔw˩.tʰɔŋ˩ kʰɵɥ˥]
Southern Min
- Hokkien POJ: Ka-bô Tông-khu

Portuguese name
- Portuguese: Freguesia de Nossa Senhora do Carmo

Freguesia de Nossa Senhora do Carmo is a civil parish (freguesia) in the Macao Special Administrative Region. The major part of the freguesia is located in Taipa but it runs through to Hengqin Island in mainland China. The freguesia is named after the Our Lady of Carmel Church. It is the largest freguesia in Macau with an area of 7.9 square kilometres (3.1 sq mi).

== History and geography ==
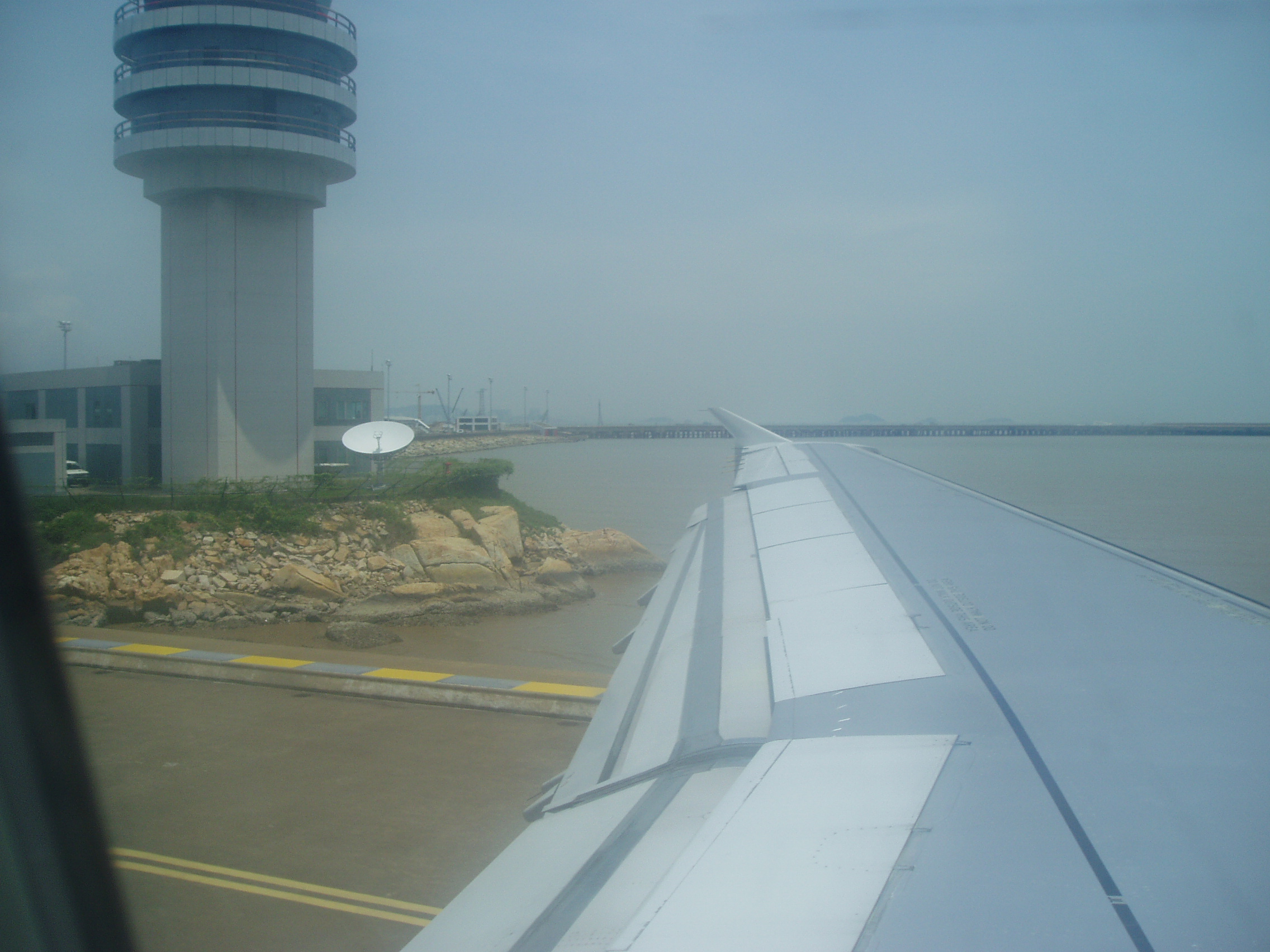
Formerly an isolated island, Ilha Kai Kiong is now a part of Freguesia de Nossa Senhora do Carmo.

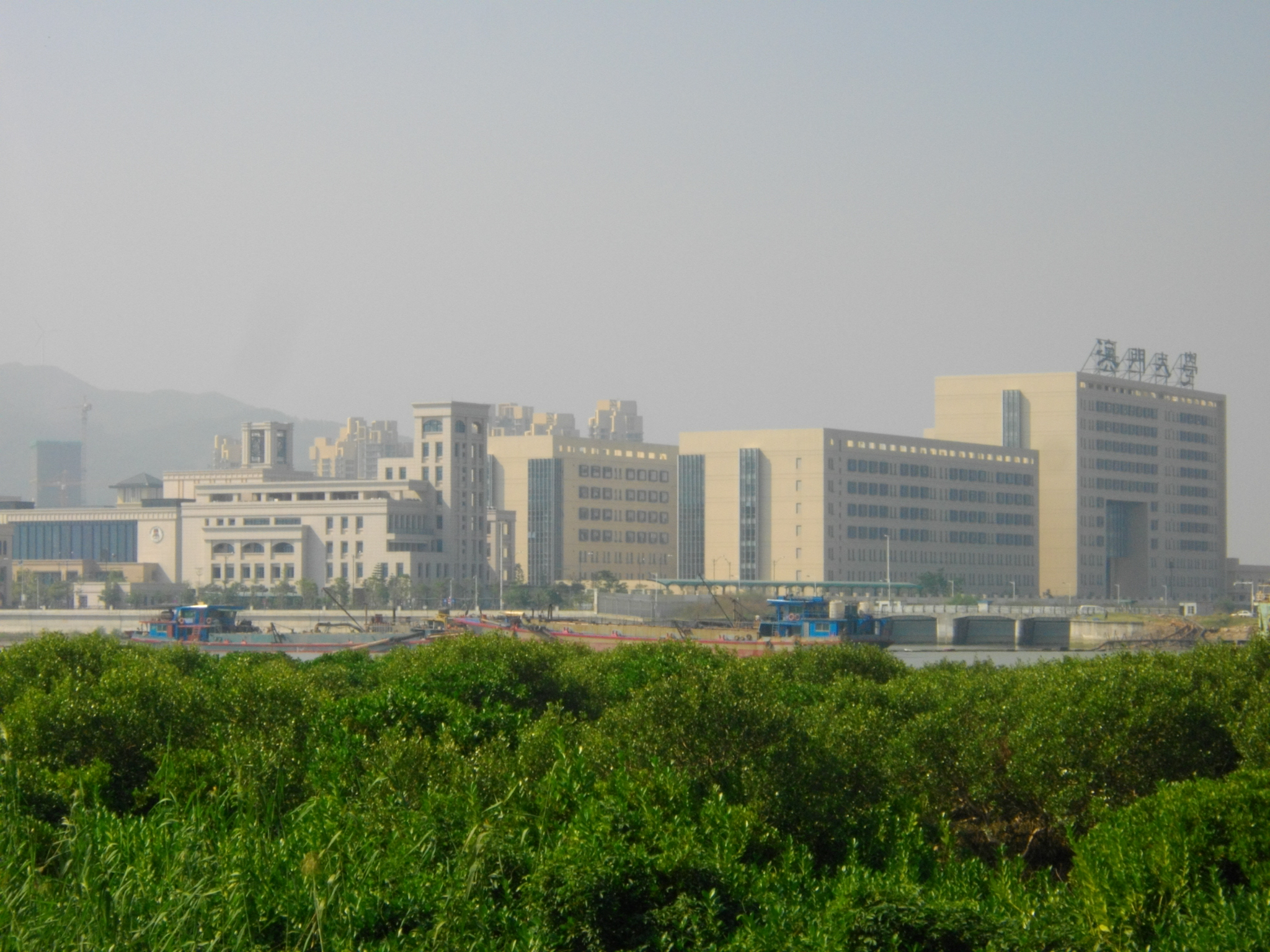
The new campus of University of Macau is on Hengqin (Ilha da Montanha) of China, but it is also a part of the freguesia.

Freguesia de Nossa Senhora do Carmo, although encompassing Taipa, is not coterminous with the island. When Macau was still under the colonial rule of Portugal, there were no freguesias defined on the islands of Taipa and Coloane by the Portuguese Macau government, but the Diocese of Macau established the Paróquia de Nossa Senhora do Carmo (Our Lady of Mount Carmel Parish), covering Taipa Island. The delineation of the freguesia is later adopted by the government from the name of the existing parish. Several reclamations were carried out along the coast of Taipa Island through different periods; the freguesia now not just only includes the area of Taipa, but is further expanded to an island called Ilha Kai Kiong, which houses the control tower of Macau International Airport. In 2013, the University of Macau was moved from Taipa to a new campus on Hengqin (Portuguese: Ilha da Montanha). The campus area applies Macau Law and is included in the freguesia.

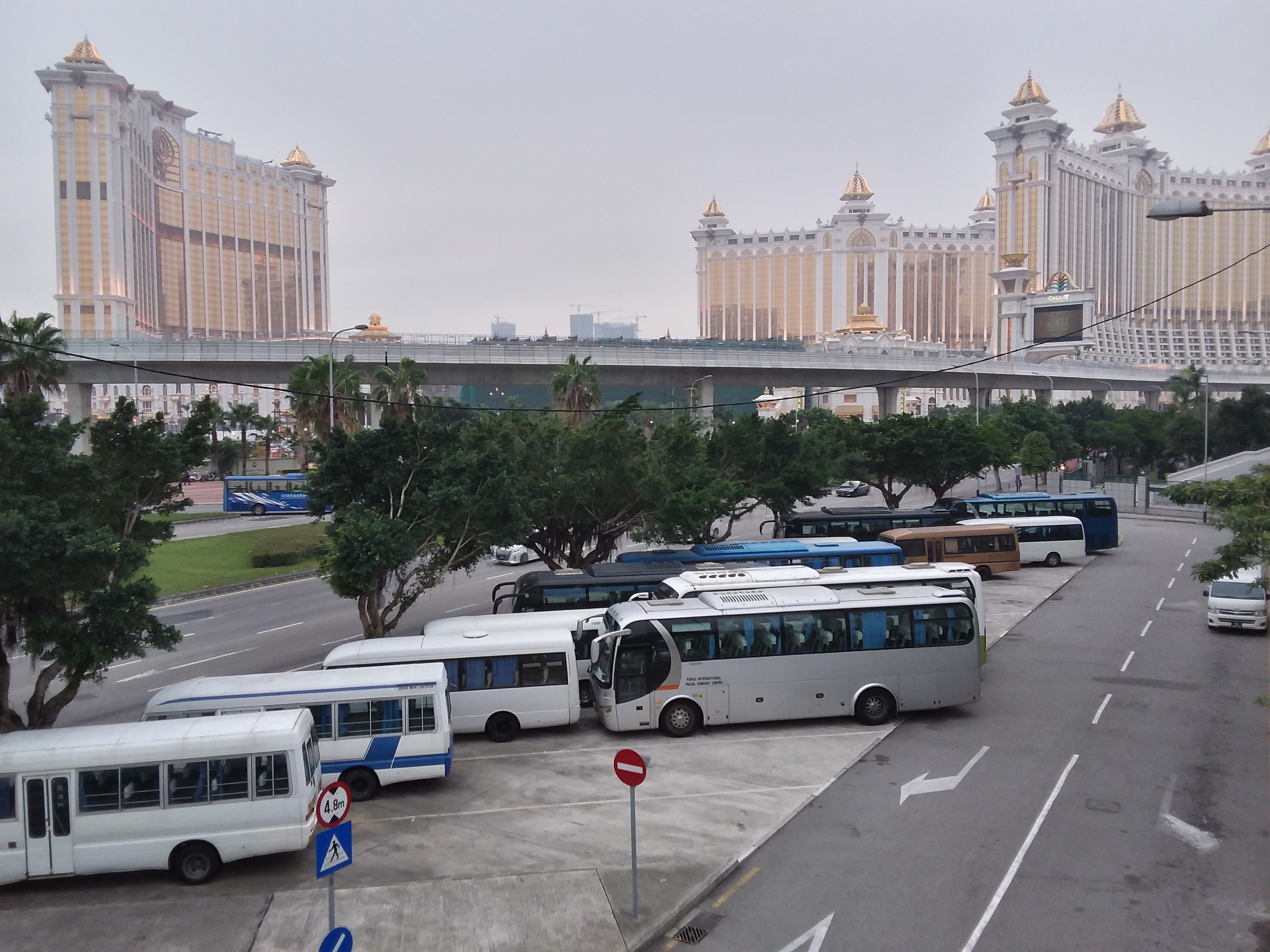
The road Estrada da Baía de Nossa Senhora da Esperança (left in the photo) marks the southern boundary of the Freguesia de Nossa Senhora do Carmo.

The southern boundary of the freguesia is the road of Estrada da Baía de Nossa Senhora da Esperança, the reclaimed land south of the road, although commonly treated as a part of Taipa, belongs to Zona do Aterro de Cotai and it does not belong to any part of Macau's freguesia.

== See also ==
- Our Lady of Carmel Church, Macau
- Municipality of Ilhas
- List of islands and peninsulas of Macau
