= Macau New Urban Zone =

Area under land reclamation in Macau

Coordinates: 22.14082°N 113.56310°E

Novos Aterros Urbanos de Macau 澳門新城區 Macau New Urban Zone
- Urban zone
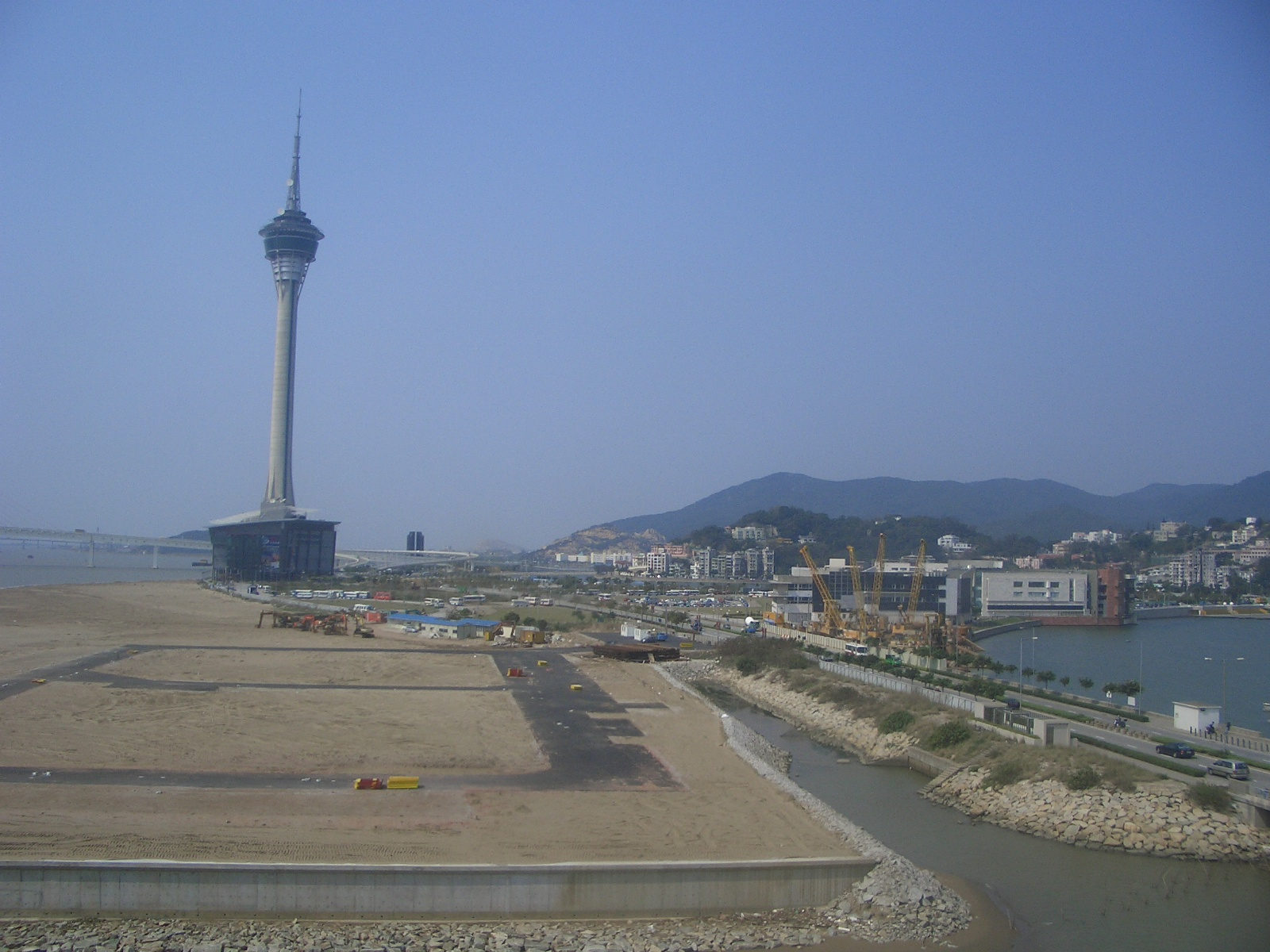
- Nova Zona Urbana under land reclamation

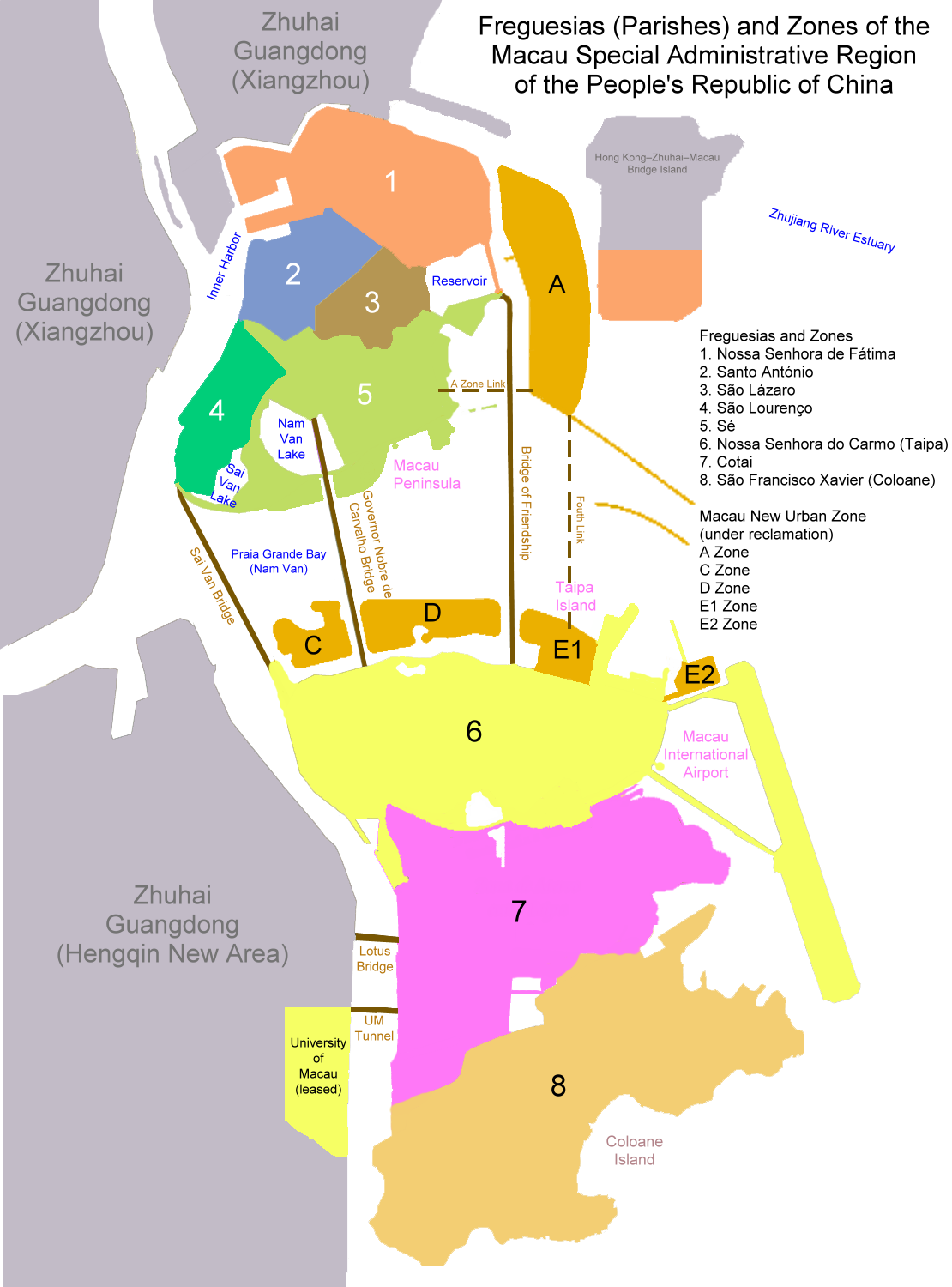
- Nova Zona Urbana in dark orange
- Region: Macau
- Time zone: UTC+08:00 (Macau Standard)

Macau New Urban Zone

Chinese name
- Traditional Chinese: 澳門新城區
- Simplified Chinese: 澳门新城区
- Jyutping: ou3 mun4*2 san1 sing4 keoi1
Transcriptions
Standard Mandarin
- Hanyu Pinyin: Àomén Xīnchéng Qū
Yue: Cantonese
- Jyutping: ou3 mun4*2 san1 sing4 keoi1

Portuguese name
- Portuguese: Nova Zona Urbana de Macau

The Macau New Urban Zone (Chinese: 澳門新城區; Portuguese: Novos Aterros Urbanos de Macau) is a 7.3-square-kilometre (79,000,000 sq ft) piece of land currently under land reclamation in Macau.

== Districts ==
Macau New Urban Zone will be divided into 5 districts:

=== Completed ===
- A – Eastern side from Outer Harbour Ferry Terminal to the north end of Avenida da Ponte de Amizade
- B – Southern side of Avenida da Dr. Sun Yat-sen (now a part of Sé)
- E1 – Western side of Taipa Ferry Terminal
- E2 – Eastern side of Taipa Ferry Terminal (now part of Nossa Senhora do Carmo)

=== Under reclamation ===
- C – Northern side of Avenida dos Jardins do Oceano (between Ponte de Sai Van and Ponte Governador Nobre de Carvalho)

=== Cancelled ===
- D – Northern side of Altira Macau (between Ponte Governador Nobre de Carvalho and Ponte de Amizade)

== See also ==
- Cotai
- Geography of Macau
