= Ilha Verde =

Island in People's Republic of China

Coordinates: 22°12′41″N 113°32′15″E

Chinese name
- Chinese: 青洲
- Literal meaning: "Green Island"
Transcriptions
Standard Mandarin
- Hanyu Pinyin: Qīngzhōu
Yue: Cantonese
- Jyutping: Cing1-zau1

Portuguese name
- Portuguese: Ilha Verde

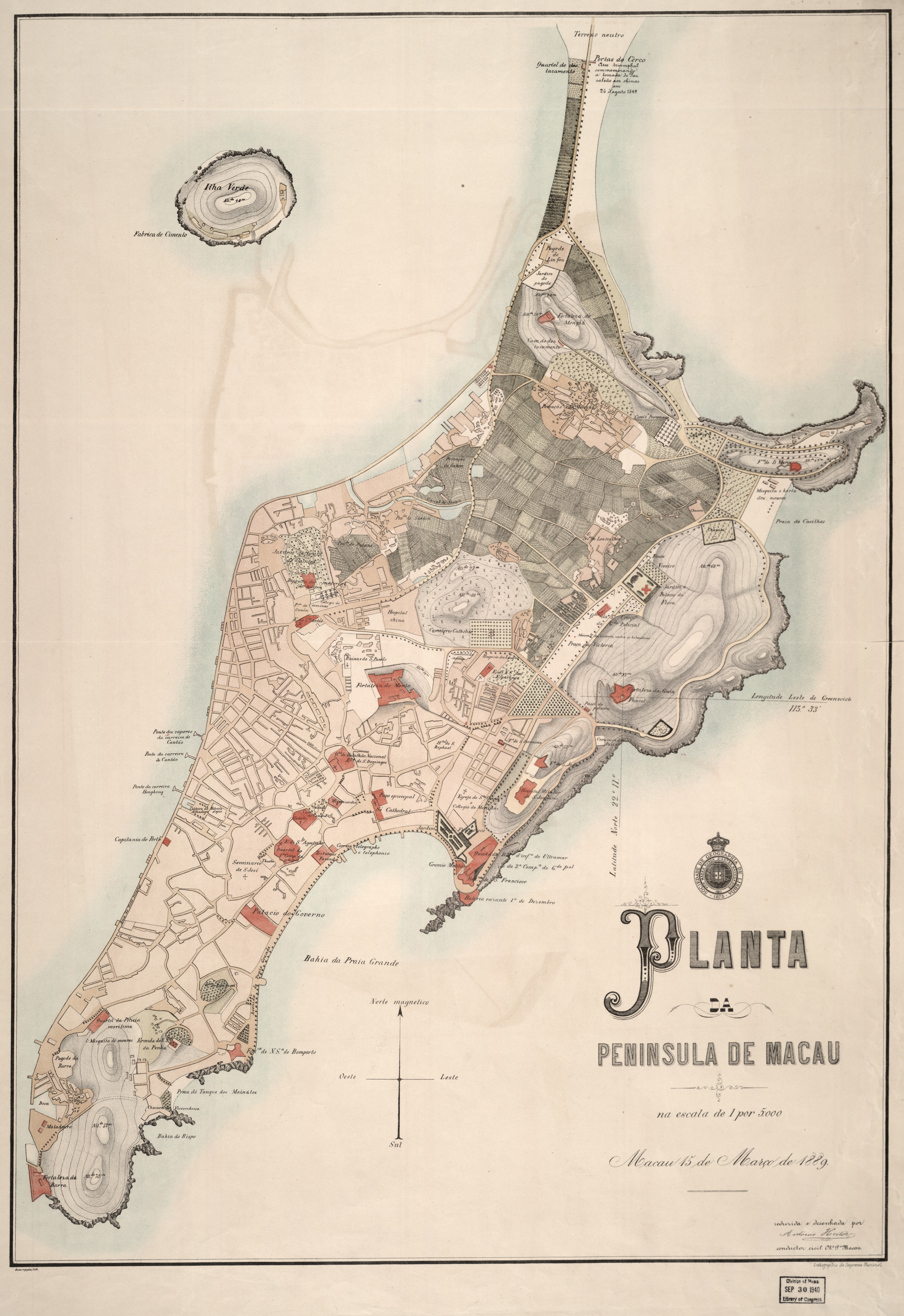
Ilha Verde and Macao Peninsula, 1889

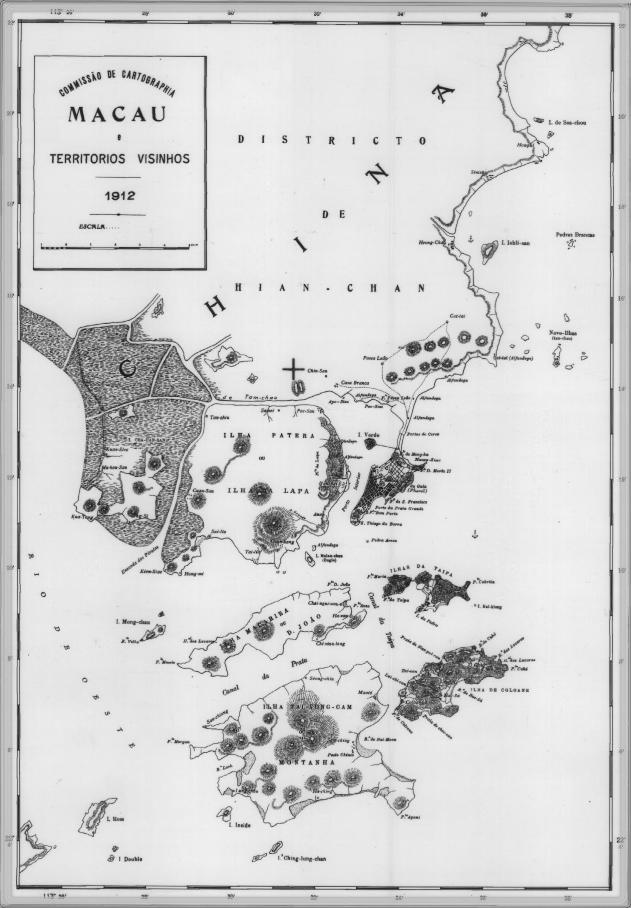
Macau and vicinity, 1912

Ilha Verde, also known by its Cantonese name Cing-zau and Mandarin name Qingzhou, is an area in the northwest of Macau Peninsula, Macau, that forms part of the Our Lady Fatima Parish. It is a former island—known in English as Verde or Green Island—to the west of the Macau Isthmus. It was settled by Jesuits.

Ilha Verde was connected to the Macau Peninsula in 1895 when a causeway (now Avenida do Conselheiro Borja) was built. Since then reclamation projects around the island took place and now it is annexed to be a part of Macau Peninsula.

Colina da Ilha Verde is a hill comprising much of Ilha Verde. The hill is 54.5 m (178.8 ft) tall, the sixth tallest in Macau. The government built barracks on the hill in 1865 and much of the island was of military area for decades, due to it being close to the Chinese border. The area used to be a crab-catching place but ceased to be upon the completion of the Ilha Verde cement factory in 1887.

== Education ==
The University of Saint Joseph has its main campus in Ilha Verde. It moved into this campus in September 2017.

== See also ==
- Geography of Macau
- List of islands and peninsulas of Macau
- Other Verde Islands
- Other Green Islands
- Green Island Cement
