= 松山 =

松山 are Chinese characters that can be transliterated as either Songshan in Mandarin Chinese, Matsuyama in Japanese or Songsan in Korean and may refer to:

== Places ==
=== Mainland China ===
- Songshan District, Chifeng, Inner Mongolia

Towns

- Songshan, Fujian, in Luoyuan County
- Songshan, Guizhou, in Ziyun Miao and Buyei Autonomous County
- Songshan, Gansu, in Bairi (Tianzhu) Tibetan Autonomous County
- Songshan, Guangxi, in Rong County
- Songshan, Liaoning, in Taihe District, Jinzhou
- Songshan, Jilin, in Panshi

=== Japan ===
- Matsuyama, Ehime, the capital city of Ehime Prefecture
  - Matsuyama Airport
- Matsuyama, Kagoshima, a former town in Soo District in Kagoshima Prefecture
- Matsuyama, Miyagi, a town in Shida District in Miyagi Prefecture
- Matsuyama, Yamagata, a town in Akumi District in Yamagata Prefecture

=== South Korea ===
- Songsan Station

=== Macau ===
- Guia Hill, a hill in St. Lazarus Parish, Macau Peninsula

=== Taiwan ===
- Songshan District, Taipei, Taiwan
  - Songshan Airport
  - Songshan–Xindian line of the Taipei Metro
    - Songshan station

== Other uses ==
- Matsuyama (surname)

== See also ==
- Matsuyama (disambiguation)
- Songshan (disambiguation)
