= Songshan =

Songshan or Song Shan, "pine mountain," (both variably written in Chinese as 松山 or 嵩山) may refer to any of the following places:

== Places ==
- Mount Song, or Song Shan, one of the Five Sacred Mountains of Taoism, on the south bank of the Yellow River in Henan
- Songshan National Nature Reserve, a nature reserve in Yanqing District, a suburban district in Beijing
- Songshan, a mountainous area in western Yunnan where the Battle of Mount Song was fought in 1944

=== Districts ===
- Songshan District, Chifeng, Inner Mongolia
- Songshan District, Taipei
  - Songshan Cultural and Creative Park, a park in Taipei

=== Subdistricts ===
- Songshan Road Subdistrict, Zhengzhou, in Erqi District, Zhengzhou, Henan

=== Towns ===
- Songshan, Fujian, in Luoyuan County
- Songshan, Guizhou, in Ziyun Miao and Buyei Autonomous County
- Songshan, Gansu, in Bairi (Tianzhu) Tibetan Autonomous County
- Songshan, Guangxi, in Rong County
- Songshan, Liaoning, in Taihe District, Jinzhou
- Songshan, Jilin, in Panshi

== Transportation ==
- Songshan Airport, the primary airport for domestic flights in Taiwan
- Songshan Line of the Taipei Metro
- Songshan station

== Persons ==
- Hu Songshan, a Chinese muslim activist

== Groups ==
- Henan Songshan Longmen F.C., a football club

== See also ==
- Zhongshan (disambiguation)
- 松山 (disambiguation)
