= Geography of Macau =

Macau is a Special Administrative Region on the southern coast of China. It is located at the south of Guangdong Province, on the tip of the peninsula formed by the Zhujiang (Pearl River) estuary on the east and the Xijiang (West River) on the west. Macau is situated 60 km (37 mi) west of Hong Kong, and 145 km (90 mi) southwest of Guangzhou, the capital of Guangdong Province. It is situated immediately east and south of Zhuhai.

The region comprises the Macau Peninsula and the islands of Taipa and Coloane. Macau was once an island but gradually a connecting sandbar turned into a narrow isthmus. Land reclamation in the 17th century made Macau into a peninsula, and a barrier gate was built to mark the separation between the peninsula and the mainland. Pre-colonial records show that Macau totalled only 2.78 km^{2} (1.07 mi^{2}) but began to increase as a result of Portuguese settlement. Land growth has accelerated since the last quarter of the 20th century, from 15 km^{2} (5.8 mi^{2}) in 1972 to 16.1 km^{2} (6.22 mi^{2}) in 1983 to 21.3 km^{2} (8.22 mi^{2}) in 1994. Macau's size has gradually increased as result of continued land reclamation, especially on Taipa and Coloane. In 2014, the total land area was approximately 30.3 km^{2} (11.7 mi^{2}).

There is a 0.34 km (0.21 mi) long border between Macau and mainland China and a forty-kilometre-long coastline. The main border crossing between Macau and China is the Portas do Cerco (Barrier Gate) Frontier Checkpoint on the Macau side, and the Gongbei checkpoint on the Chinese side.

== Location, size, border, and coastline ==
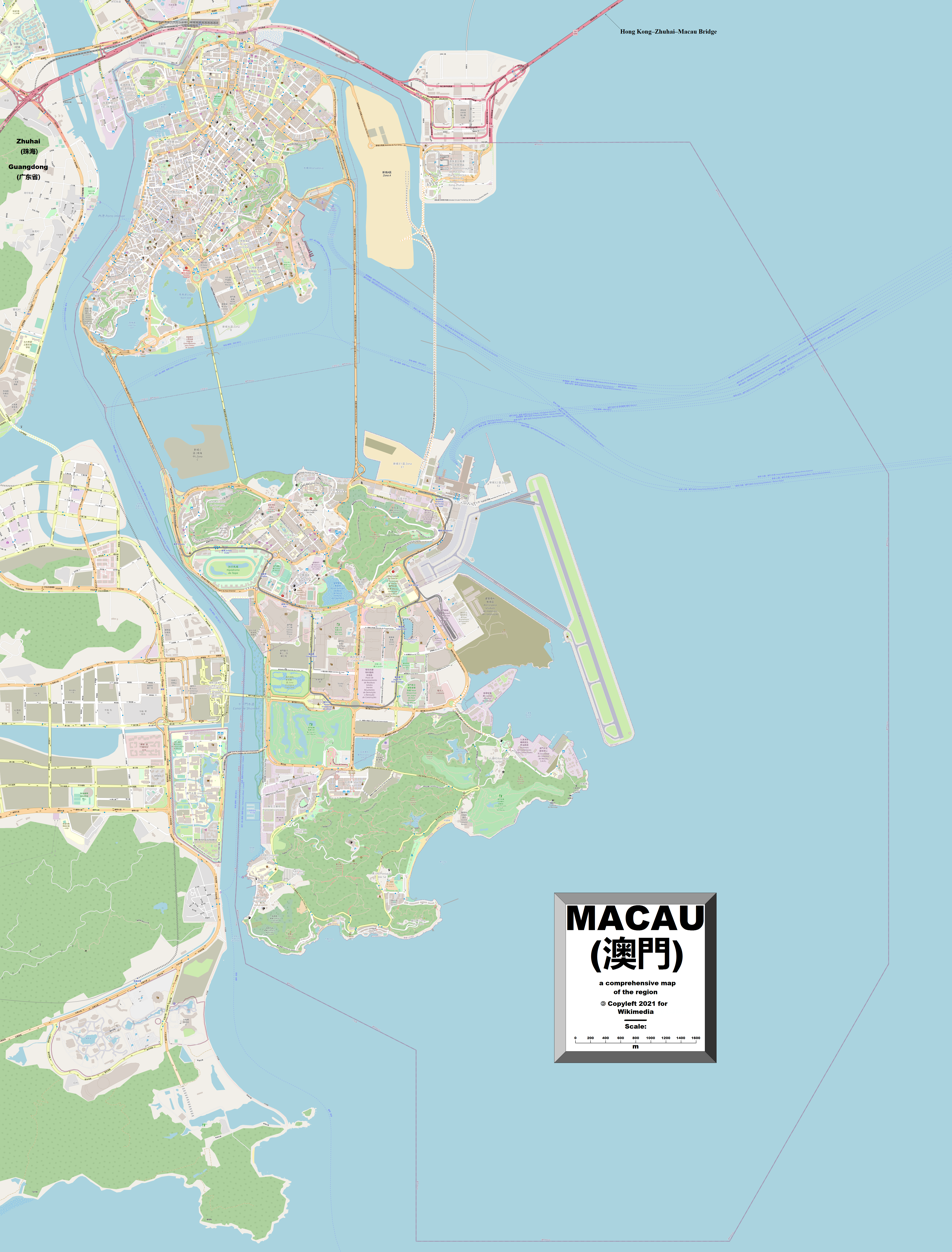
Macau borders the city of Zhuhai in Guangdong Province. The map also shows Macau's maritime boundaries, the western end of the Hong Kong–Zhuhai–Macau Bridge, the leased territory in Zhuhai (the University of Macau) and Macau Light Rapid Transit.

Geographic coordinates: 22°10′N 113°33′E

=== Area ===
- Total: 115.4 km^{2}
- Land: 30.4 km^{2}
- Water: 85 km^{2}

=== Land boundaries ===
- Total: 0.34 km
- Border city: Zhuhai, Guangdong Province 0.34 km

=== Coastline ===
- Coastline: 50.63 km
- Maritime claims: not specified

== Topography ==
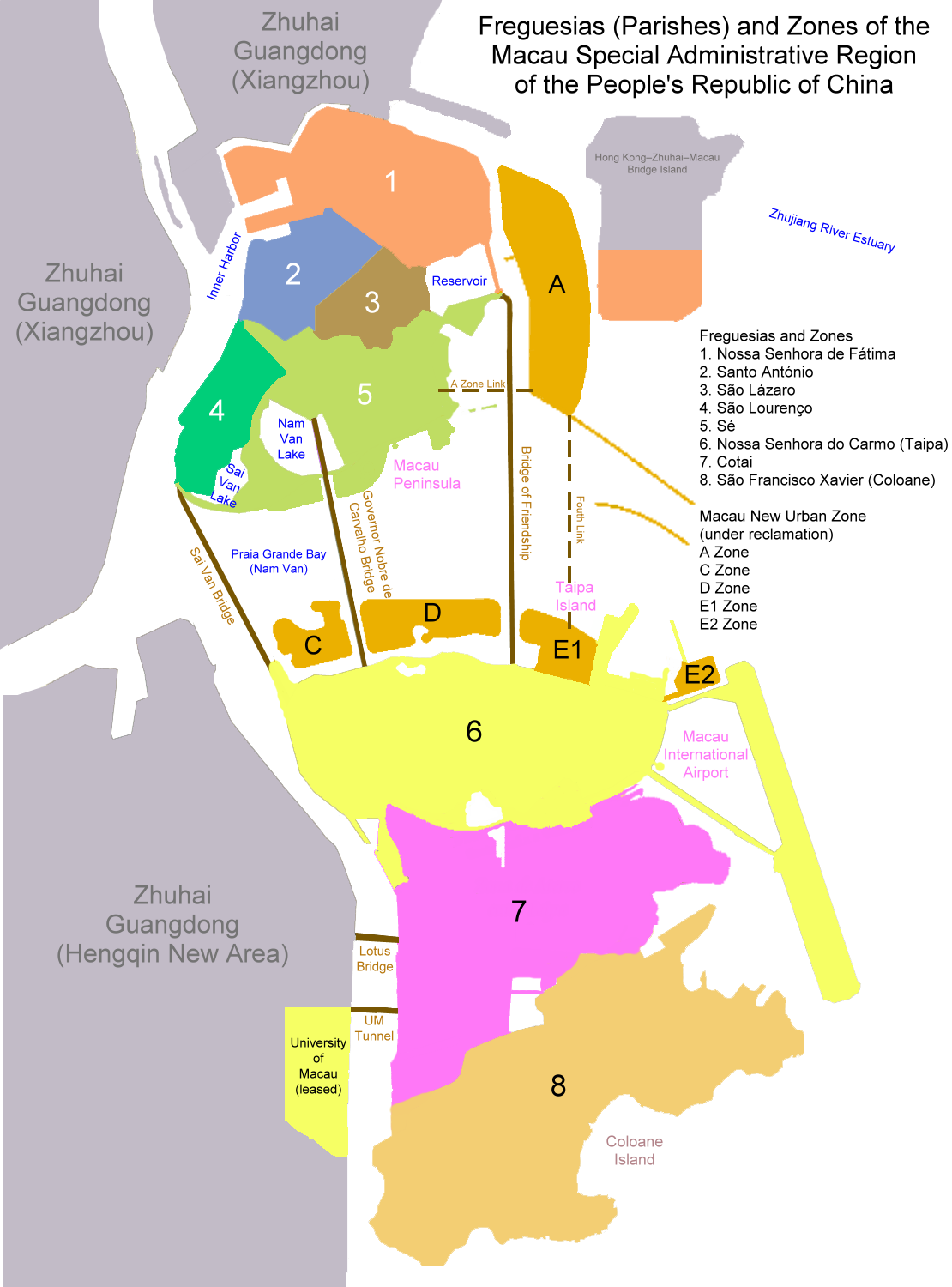
The administrative divisions within Macau (Click here for Satellite Image)

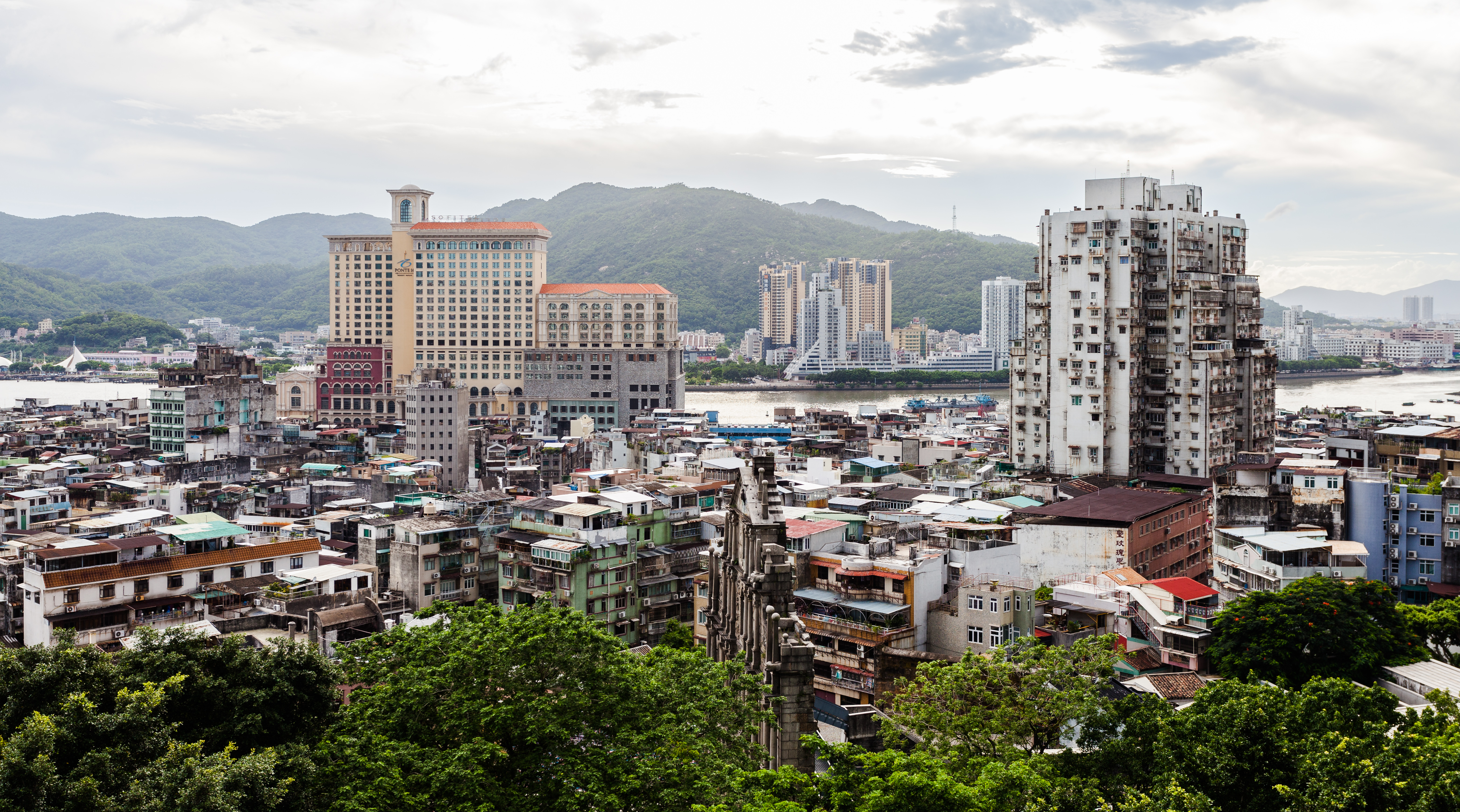
View of the old city

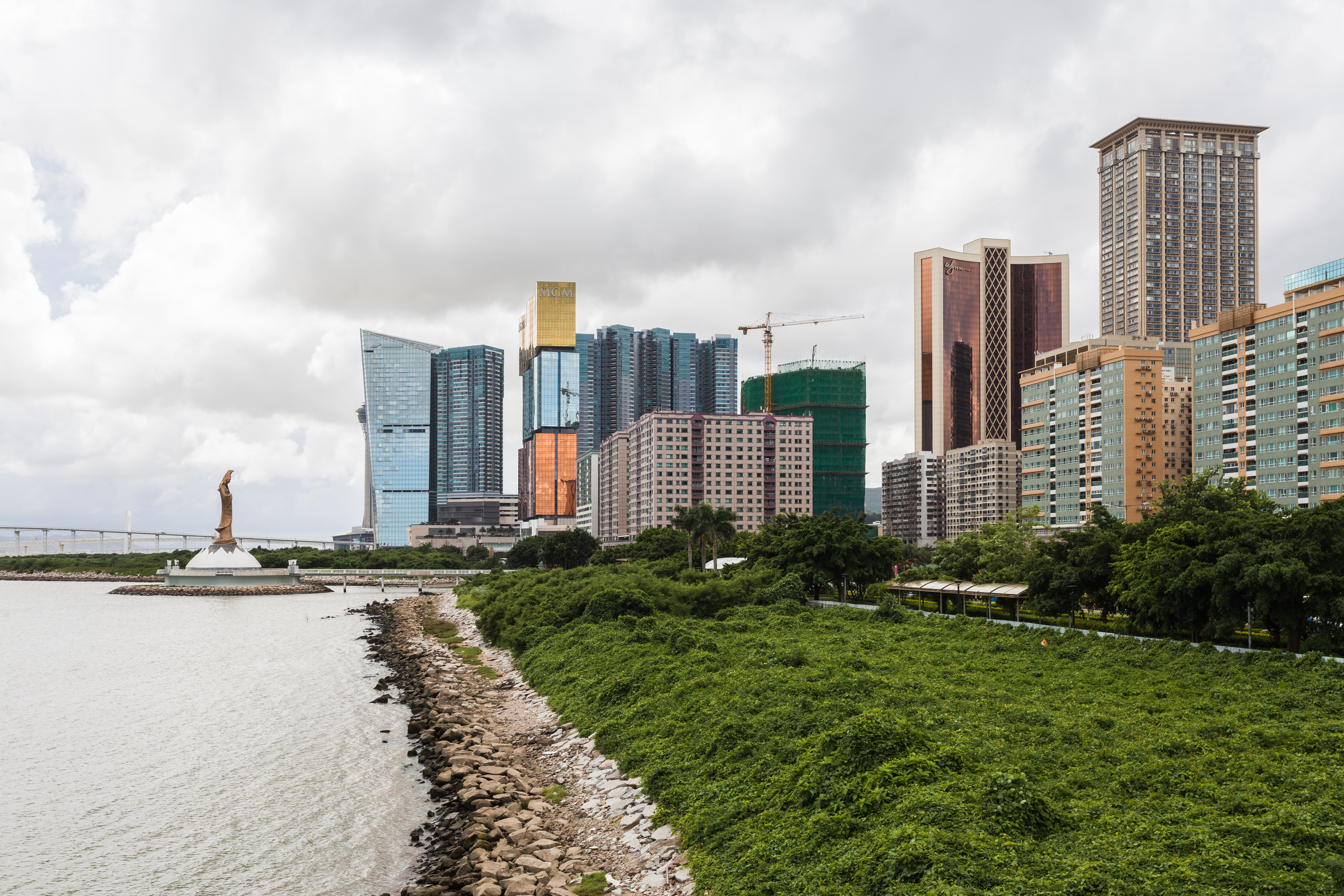
View of the casinos

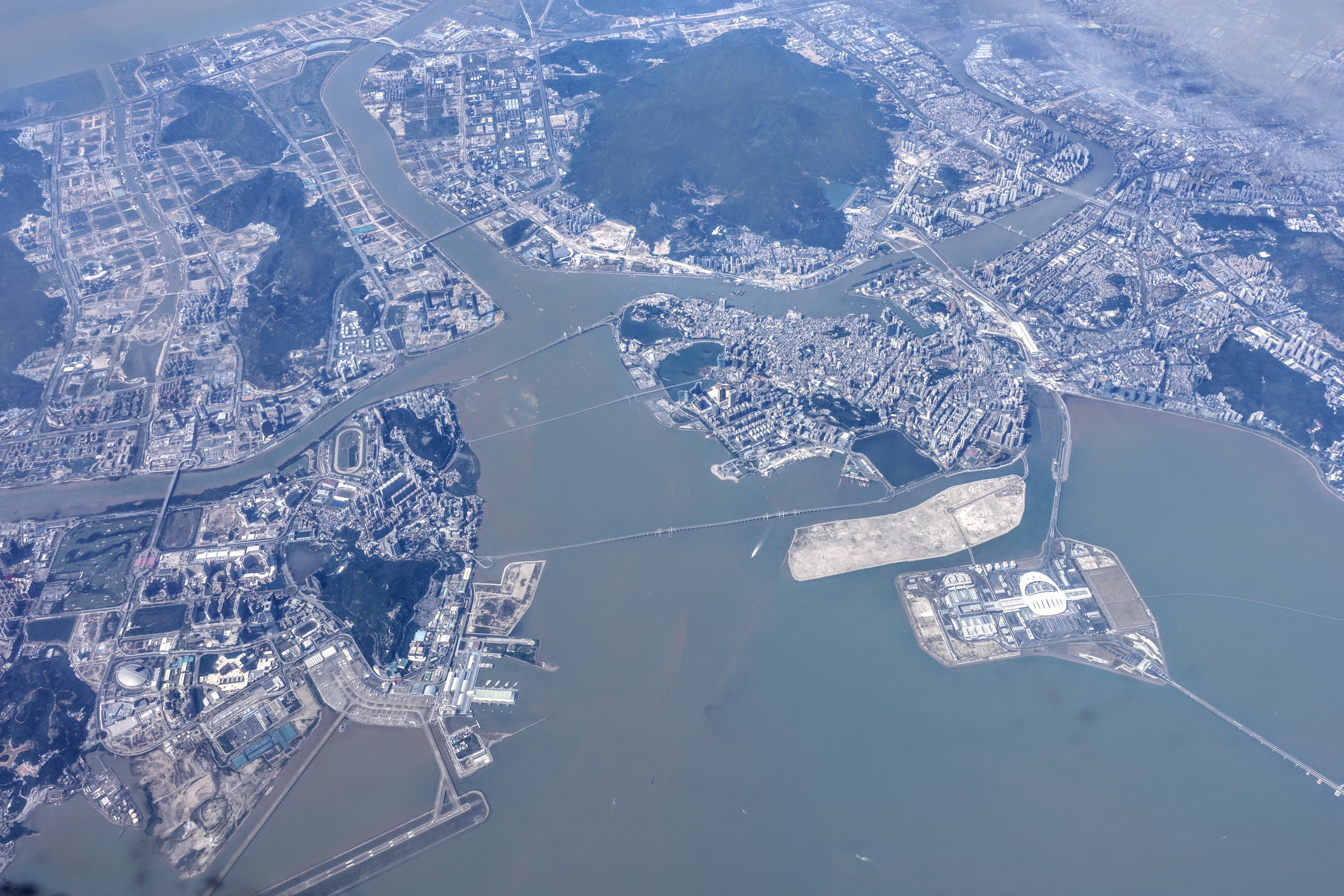
View of Macao from air

Location: Eastern Asia, bordering the South China Sea and China

Terrain: generally flat
Elevation extremes:
lowest point: South China Sea 0 m
highest point: Coloane Alto 172 m (564 ft)

=== List of highest hills in Macau SAR ===
Name	Location	Notes	Height	Photo
Alto de Coloane	Coloane		172.4m	
Unnamed (Triangulation Pillar C6)	Coloane		170.3m	
Unnamed (Triangulation Pillar C4)	Coloane		163.8m	
Taipa Grande	Taipa		160.4m	
Unnamed (Triangulation Pillar T16)	Taipa		152.9m	
Ponto Central	Coloane		138.1m	
Monte de Ka Ho	Coloane		132m	
Unnamed (Triangulation Pillar C56)	Coloane		126m	
Morro de Artilharia	Coloane		120m	
Unnamed	Coloane		114.8m	
Taipa Pequena	Taipa		112m	
Unnamed (Triangulation Point C25)	Coloane		108.8m	
Guia Hill	Macau		91.6m	
Barra Hill	Macau		74.4m	
Ilha Verde hill	Macau		54.5m	

Macau has generally flat terrain resulting from extensive land reclamation, but numerous steep hills mark the original natural land mass. The modern high-rise skyline of Macau obscures much of the hilly landscape. The Macau skyline both defines and obscures its topography.

The Macau Peninsula is narrow in shape but varies in terrain.

== Climate ==
Macau

Climate chart (precipitation, max. and min. temperature)
J	F	M	A	M	J	J	A	S	O	N	D
32 18 12	59 18 13	83 21 16	217 25 20	362 28 24	340 30 26	290 32 26	352 31 26	194 30 25	117 27 22	43 23 18	35 20 14
- █ Average max. and min. temperatures in °C
- █ Precipitation totals in mm
- Source: WMO
Imperial conversion
J	F	M	A	M	J	J	A	S	O	N	D
1.3 64 54	2.3 64 56	3.2 69 61	8.6 76 68	14 83 74	13 87 78	11 89 79	14 88 79	7.6 86 77	4.6 81 72	1.7 74 64	1.4 67 57
- █ Average max. and min. temperatures in °F
- █ Precipitation totals in inches

Although Macau is located in the tropics, it has a humid subtropical climate (Köppen climate classification Cwa), because the Siberian pressure system in the winter pushes cool air further south than similar semipermanent permanent high pressure systems. Its average year-round temperature is 22.7 °C (72.9 °F). Summers are very hot and humid: the July average temperature is 28.9 °C (84.0 °F) and the highest daytime temperature could reach 35 °C (95 °F). However, the heat is generally less intense than many places in mainland China due to the coastal location. Winters are short and mild: the January average is 15.0 °C (59.0 °F) and the lowest temperature could drop to 5 °C (41 °F), but very rarely any lower. There is about 2,120 millimetres (83 in) of rainfall annually, with drier winters.

Macau is exposed to tropical storms originating from the southern Pacific Ocean during the summer. Major destruction occurred in September 1874, when a devastating typhoon hit Macau and high seas swept across the low-lying area of the peninsula. There are always a few tropical storm occurrences in Macau each year (typically between May and October), although they vary in strengths. When they occur, they usually bring strong winds, rainfall and lower temperatures.

Prevailing winds and weather types change follow the monsoon pattern. It is warm and moist when the southeast and southwest winds are coming from the Pacific Ocean, and typhoons are relatively common during summertime. It is dry and slightly cold when the north winds are coming from Siberia or the northern part of mainland China.

During the transition period from northeast monsoon to southwest monsoon (March and April), the weather is moist and foggy. It is Macau's spring season. Summer is from May to September, when the southeast and southwest monsoon prevailing. It is rather hot and rainy. The weather in autumn (the end of September and October) is sunny and warm, when the southwest monsoon withdrawing gradually and the northeast monsoon advancing south. It is generally regarded as the most comfortable season there. Winter is from November to February next year, when the northeast monsoon prevailing. It is mainly dry, with occasional cold fronts arriving.

There are moderate to high levels of humidity year-round, with an annual average of 79.3%. Annual sunshine totals are moderate, at more than 1800 hours.

Climate data for Macau (1991–2020, extremes 1901–present)
Month	Jan	Feb	Mar	Apr	May	Jun	Jul	Aug	Sep	Oct	Nov	Dec	Year
Record high °C (°F)	29.1 (84.4)	30.2 (86.4)	31.5 (88.7)	35.3 (95.5)	37.5 (99.5)	36.9 (98.4)	38.9 (102.0)	38.5 (101.3)	38.1 (100.6)	36.0 (96.8)	34.2 (93.6)	30.0 (86.0)	38.9 (102.0)
Mean daily maximum °C (°F)	18.6 (65.5)	19.2 (66.6)	21.4 (70.5)	25.1 (77.2)	28.7 (83.7)	30.5 (86.9)	31.4 (88.5)	31.5 (88.7)	30.8 (87.4)	28.5 (83.3)	24.7 (76.5)	20.3 (68.5)	25.9 (78.6)
Daily mean °C (°F)	15.2 (59.4)	16.1 (61.0)	18.6 (65.5)	22.3 (72.1)	25.8 (78.4)	27.8 (82.0)	28.4 (83.1)	28.3 (82.9)	27.5 (81.5)	25.1 (77.2)	21.3 (70.3)	16.9 (62.4)	22.8 (73.0)
Mean daily minimum °C (°F)	12.7 (54.9)	13.9 (57.0)	16.5 (61.7)	20.3 (68.5)	23.7 (74.7)	25.7 (78.3)	26.1 (79.0)	25.9 (78.6)	25.1 (77.2)	22.7 (72.9)	18.8 (65.8)	14.3 (57.7)	20.5 (68.9)
Record low °C (°F)	−1.8 (28.8)	0.4 (32.7)	3.2 (37.8)	8.5 (47.3)	13.8 (56.8)	18.5 (65.3)	19.3 (66.7)	19.0 (66.2)	13.2 (55.8)	9.5 (49.1)	5.0 (41.0)	0.0 (32.0)	−1.8 (28.8)
Average precipitation mm (inches)	34.2 (1.35)	43.9 (1.73)	80.0 (3.15)	153.5 (6.04)	286.0 (11.26)	373.7 (14.71)	290.7 (11.44)	331.4 (13.05)	227.8 (8.97)	75.1 (2.96)	39.0 (1.54)	31.3 (1.23)	1,966.6 (77.43)
Average precipitation days	5.8	8.9	11.4	11.6	14.1	17.7	16.6	16.2	12.3	6.2	4.9	5.0	130.9
Average relative humidity (%)	74.9	80.5	85.0	86.3	84.9	84.6	82.7	82.1	78.3	72.5	72.6	70.8	79.6
Mean monthly sunshine hours	126.5	85.7	74.8	94.6	135.5	159.0	211.3	188.2	178.3	192.2	158.1	145.1	1,749.3
Source: Macao Meteorological and Geophysical Bureau

== Natural resources ==
Negligible. In the past, large amounts of granite were extracted from Macau's hills for use as building material.

=== Fresh water ===
Relying on water supply from the Xijiang River, in 2006 Macau suffered its worse crisis of salinity in freshwater during the dry season, which takes place in late winter and early spring. To address salinity issues, as of 2018 three water supply pipelines to Macau have been built and a fourth pipeline was planned for completion in 2019.

== Land use and reclamation ==
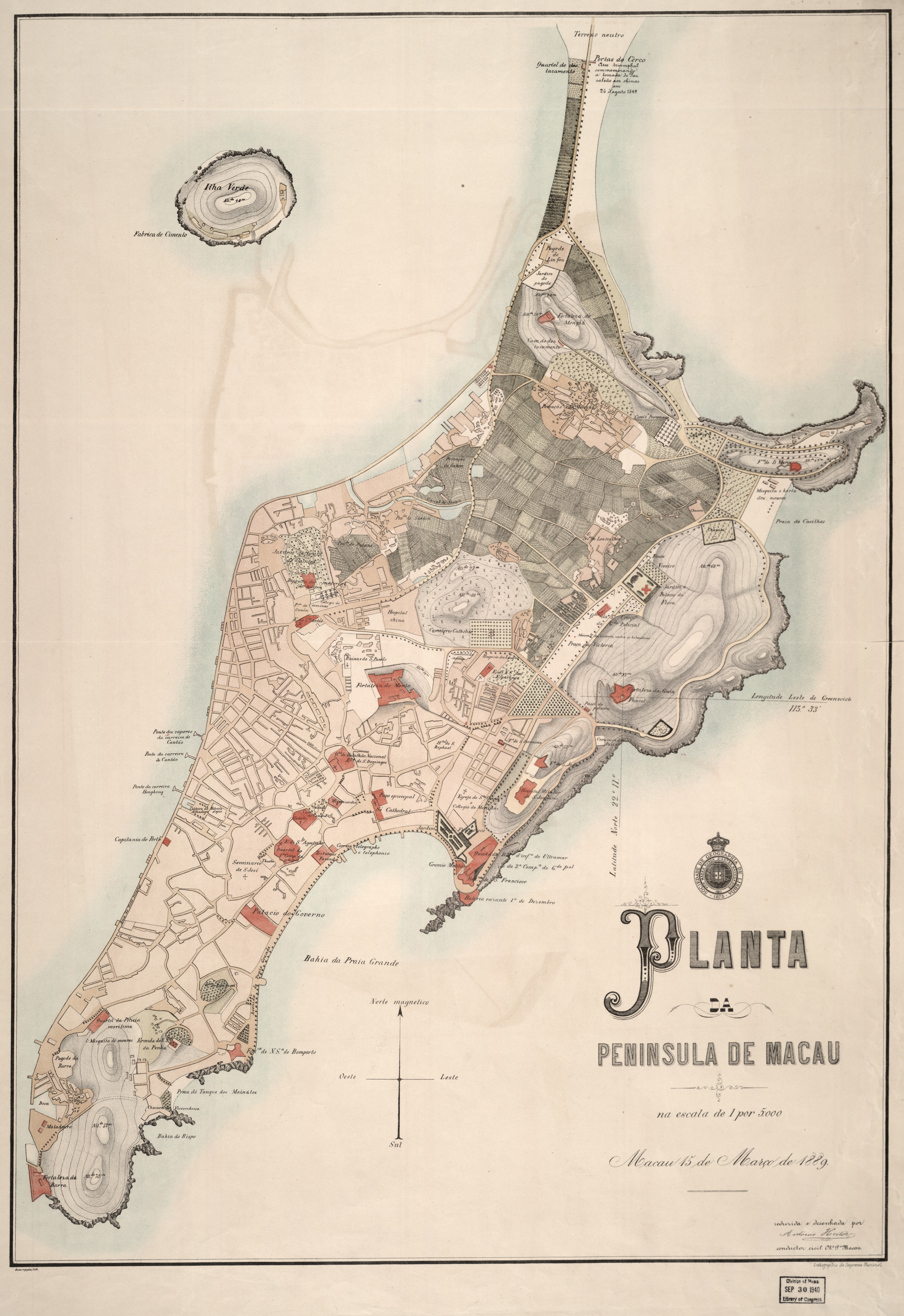
Macau Peninsula and Ilha Verde in 1889

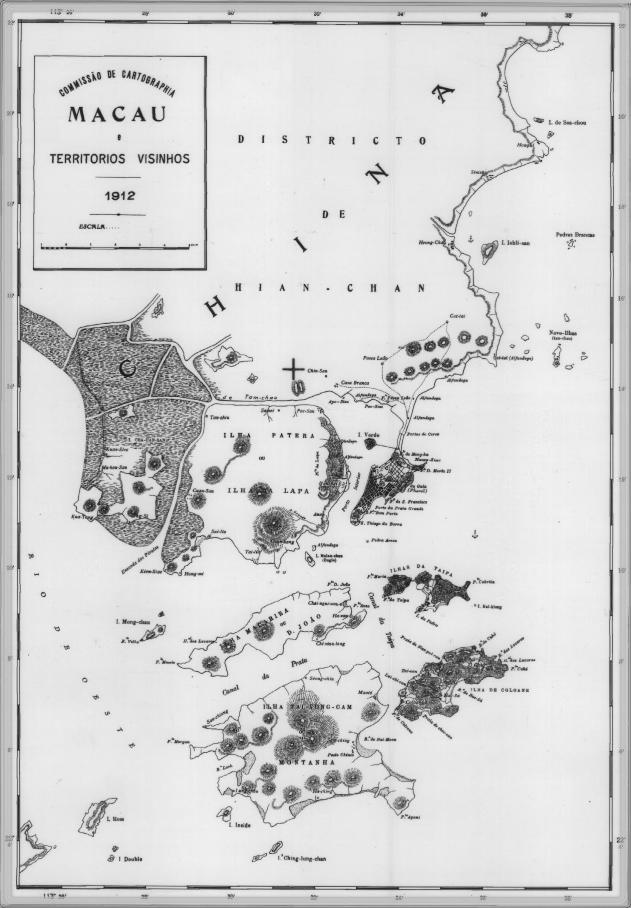
Macau Peninsula, Taipa and Coloane in 1912

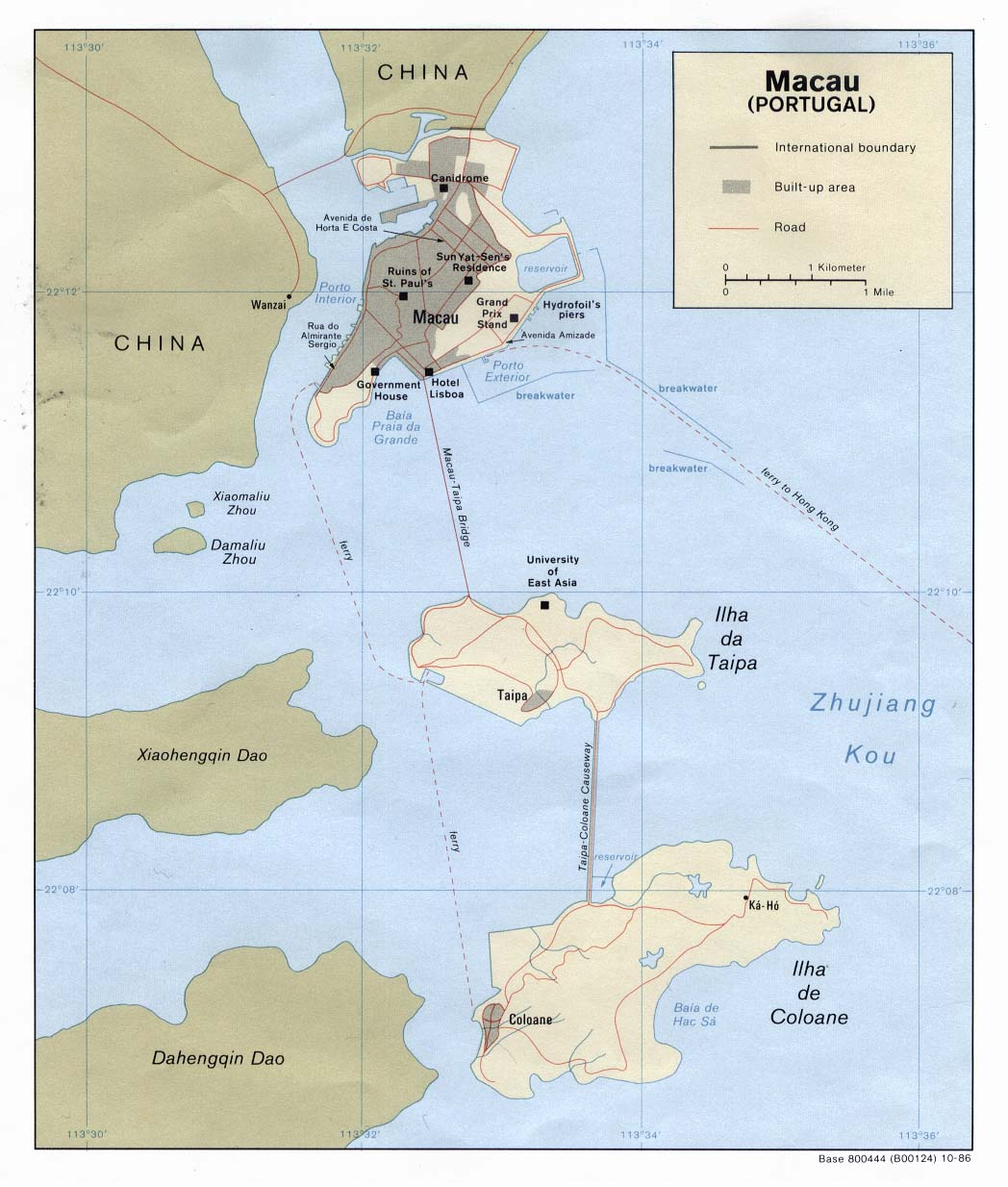
Macau Peninsula, Taipa and Coloane in 1986

Land reclamation in Macau from 1555 to 2011

Until early 20th century, the Macau peninsula was dotted with small farms on its northern area, beyond the walls protecting the city. Currently, in the Macau peninsula, no arable land, natural pastures or woodland exists and forests have been cleared and plant species have been subjected to profound changes. Coloane on the other hand, due to its later colonisation, still has its forests and is dotted with small farms, namely around the Coloane, Hac Sa and Ka Ho villages.

arable land: 0%
permanent crops: 0%
other: 100% (2011)

In 2010 plans were announced for an additional 3.5 square kilometres of land reclamation in Macau, to be carried out over five years and divided into six phases. These areas cover an area east of the Outer Harbour Ferry Terminal, an area south of Avenida Sun Yat Sen, and the north side of Taipa Island.

The change of total area of Macau (in km square) since the year of 1912:

Note
* - not included in "Total area of Macau"

Year	Area of Macau Peninsula	Area of Taipa	Area of Coloane	Area of Cotai	Total area of Macau	Area of UM Hengqin*
1912	3.4*	2.3	5.9	—	11.6	—
1936	5.2	2.6	6.0	—	13.8	—
1957	5.5	3.3	6.3	—	15.1	—
1986	5.8	3.7	7.1	—	16.6	—
1991	6.5	4.0	7.6	—	18.1	—
1996	7.7	5.8	7.6	—	21.3	—
1999	7.8	6.2	7.6	2.2	23.8	—
2000	8.5	6.2	7.6	3.1	25.4	—
2001	8.5	6.2	7.6	3.5	25.8	—
2002	8.5	6.2	7.6	4.5	26.8	—
2003	8.7	6.2	7.6	4.7	27.3	—
2004	8.8	6.4	7.6	4.7	27.5	—
2005	8.9	6.5	7.6	5.2	28.2	—
2006	9.3	6.5	7.6	5.2	28.6	—
2007–08	9.3	6.7	7.6	5.6	29.2	—
2009	9.3	6.8	7.6	5.8	29.5	—
2010	9.3	6.8	7.6	6.0*	29.7	—
2011–12	9.3	7.4	7.6	5.6	29.9	—
2013–14	9.3	7.6	7.6	5.8	30.3	1.0
2015 (Sept.)	9.3	7.6	7.6	5.9	30.4	1.0

== Environmental factors ==
Dense urban environment.

Geography – note: essentially urban; three bridges connect the two islands of Coloane and Taipa to the peninsula on mainland, and an isthmus connects Coloane and Taipa.

== See also ==
- Geography of China
- Geography of Hong Kong
