= Zhongshan Island =

River island on the west bank of the Pearl River Delta in Guangdong, China

Native name: 中山岛
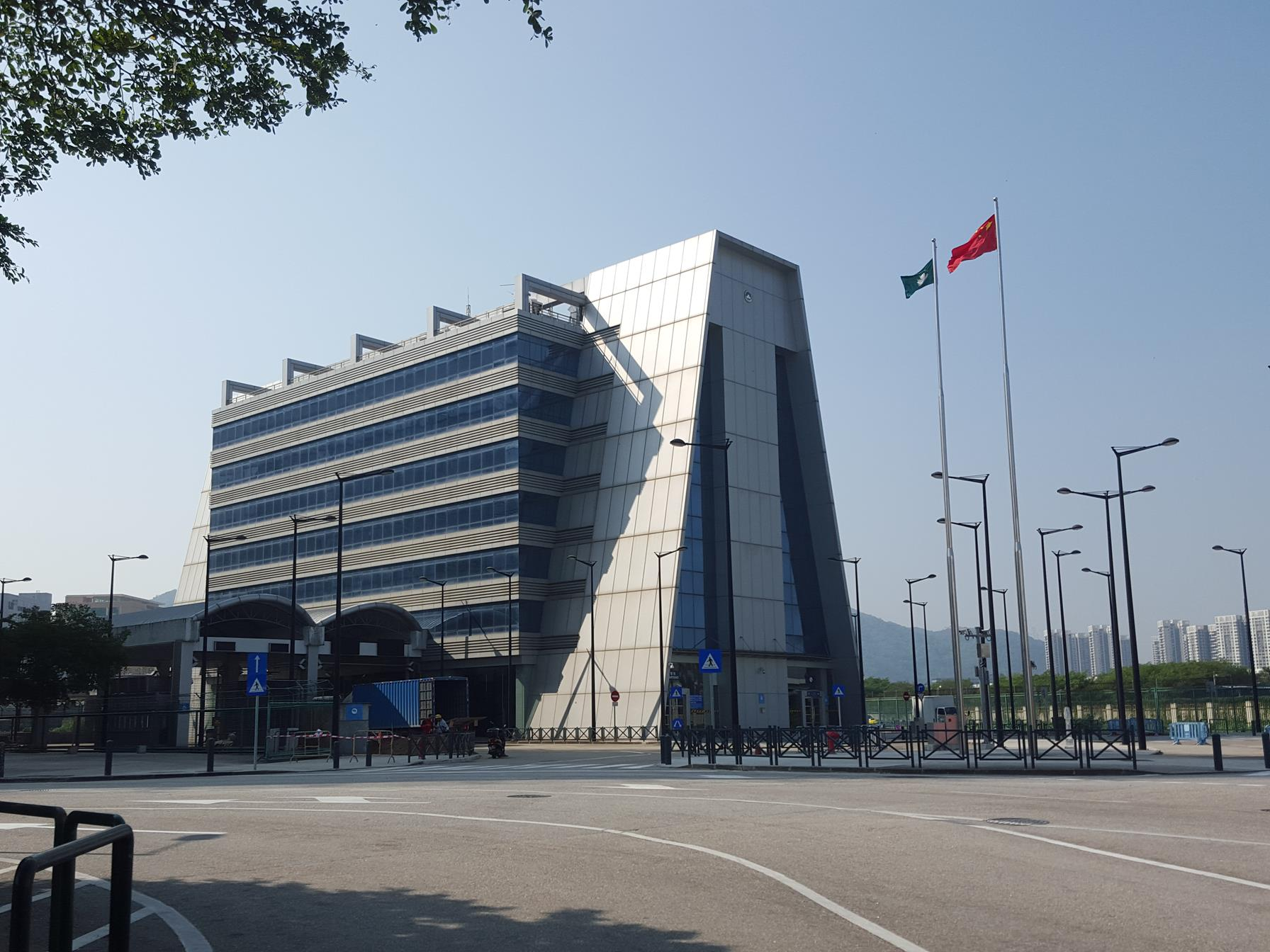
- The Cross-Border Industrial Area Frontier Building is an immigration checkpoint connecting Macau and Zhuhai; note the two flags.

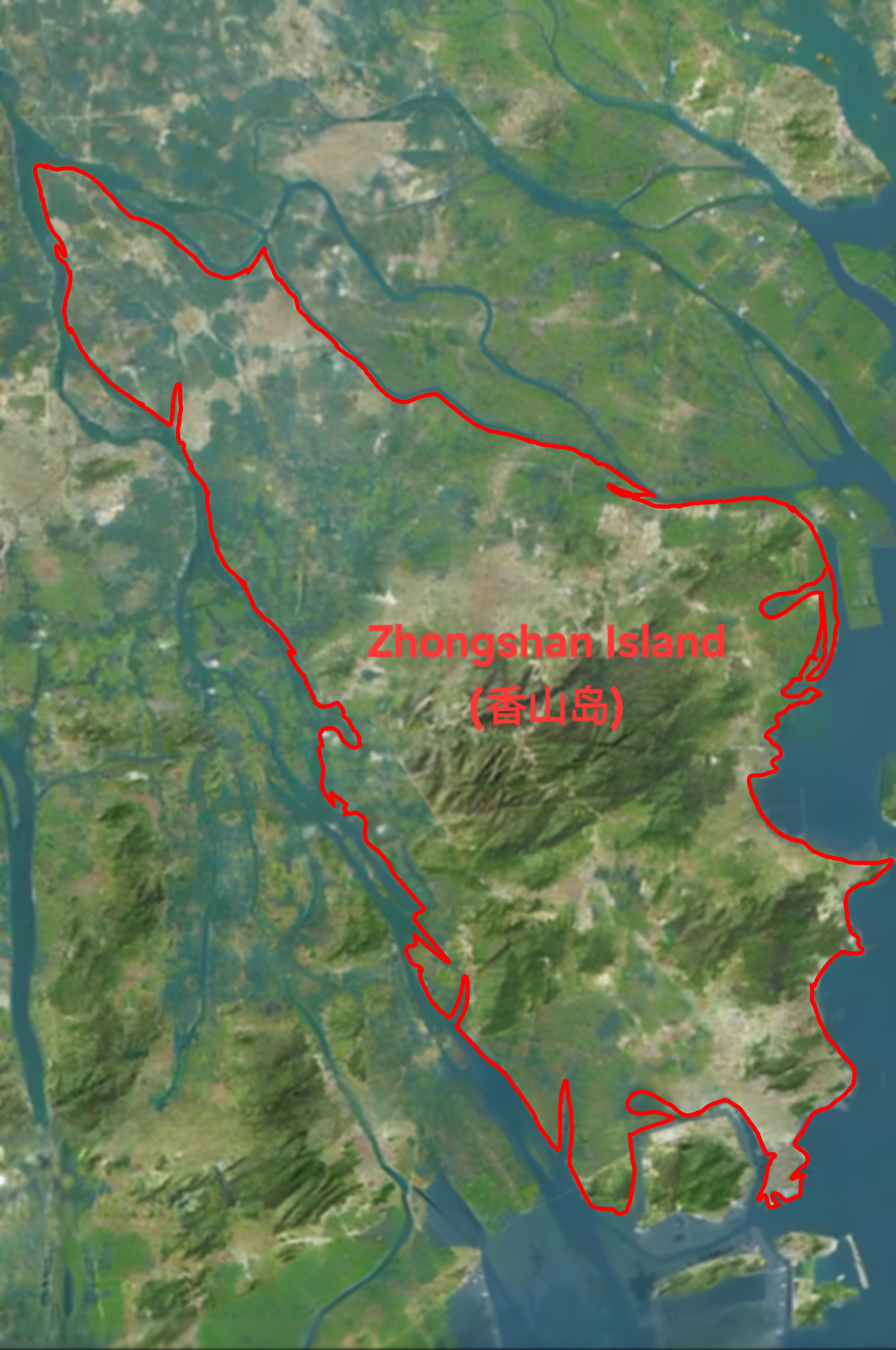
- Satellite map

Geography
- Location: Pearl River Delta
- Coordinates: 22°11′56″N 113°32′46″E
- Adjacent to: Pearl River; Xi River
- Area: 1,055 km^{2} (407 sq mi)
- Area rank: 322nd
- Highest elevation: 92 m (302 ft)
- Highest point: Guia Hill

Administration
- China
- Province: Guangdong
- Prefecture-level cities: Zhuhai (part); Zhongshan (part)
- Macau (special administrative region of China)
- Parishes: Nossa Senhora de Fátima; Santo António; São Lázaro; Sé; São Lourenço

Demographics
- Population: 3,600,000 (2020)
- Population rank: 34th
- Pop. density: 3,400/km^{2} (8800/sq mi)
- Languages: Cantonese; Mandarin; Macanese Portuguese; Zhongshan Min; English
- Ethnic groups: Han Chinese (Cantonese, Hakka); Zhuang; Macanese

Additional information
- Time zone: China Standard Time and Macau Standard Time (UTC+8)

Zhongshan Island
- Traditional Chinese: 中山島
- Simplified Chinese: 中山岛
- Literal meaning: Named for Sun Yat-sen
Transcriptions
Standard Mandarin
- Hanyu Pinyin: Zhōngshān Dǎo
- Wade–Giles: Chung-shan Tao
- IPA: [ʈʂʊ́ŋ.ʂán tàʊ]

Former names

Macao Island
- Traditional Chinese: 澳門島
- Simplified Chinese: 澳门岛
Transcriptions
Standard Mandarin
- Hanyu Pinyin: Àomén Dǎo
- Wade–Giles: Ao-mên Tao

Xiangshan Island
- Traditional Chinese: 香山島
- Simplified Chinese: 香山岛
Transcriptions
Standard Mandarin
- Hanyu Pinyin: Xiāngshān Dǎo
- Wade–Giles: Hsiang-shan Tao

Zhongshan Island (Chinese: 中山岛, JUNG-shawn), formerly also known as Macau Island or Xiangshan Island, (Note: Previous romanisations include Macao Island, Heangshan Island, and Hiang Shan Island.) is a river island on the west bank of the Pearl River Delta in Guangdong, China. This area is separated from the rest of the river delta by the Xi River and Shiqi River, and consists of portions of three cities with a combined population of approximately 3.6 million as of 2020: Macau, Zhuhai and Zhongshan. This places Zhongshan Island among the world's most populous islands, similar to Shikoku or Puerto Rico.

At the southern tip of the island is the Macau Peninsula, with more than 500 thousand people. The remainder of the island (and more than 80% of the population) is part of Zhongshan (approximately 1.8 million people) and Xiangzhou District of Zhuhai (approximately 1.3 million people).

China considers the island to have been linked to the continent and no longer an island since the time of the Ming dynasty (14-17th century). There are also studies which state the area was a group of islets and shoals by the time of the Ming dynasty. However, this has been debated as Zhongshan Island still remains separated from the continent by the Pearl River from three sides and the ocean from the fourth side. If counted as an island, it is the second most densely populated island in China.

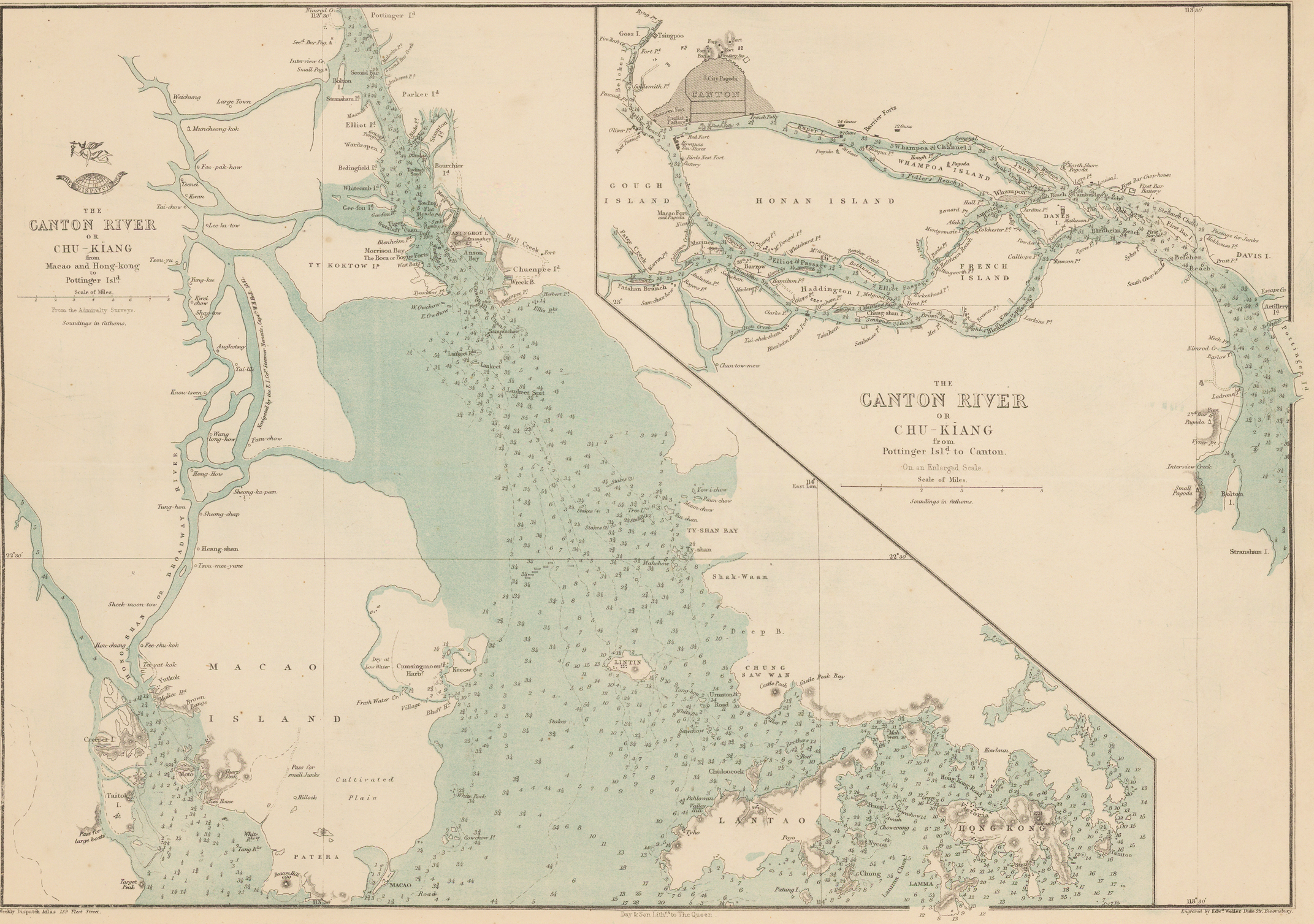
A map of the Pearl River estuary in 1863. Zhongshan Island, on the lower left corner, is labelled as Macao Island, and separated from the mainland by the Shiqi River (labelled as "Hong Shan or Broadway River").

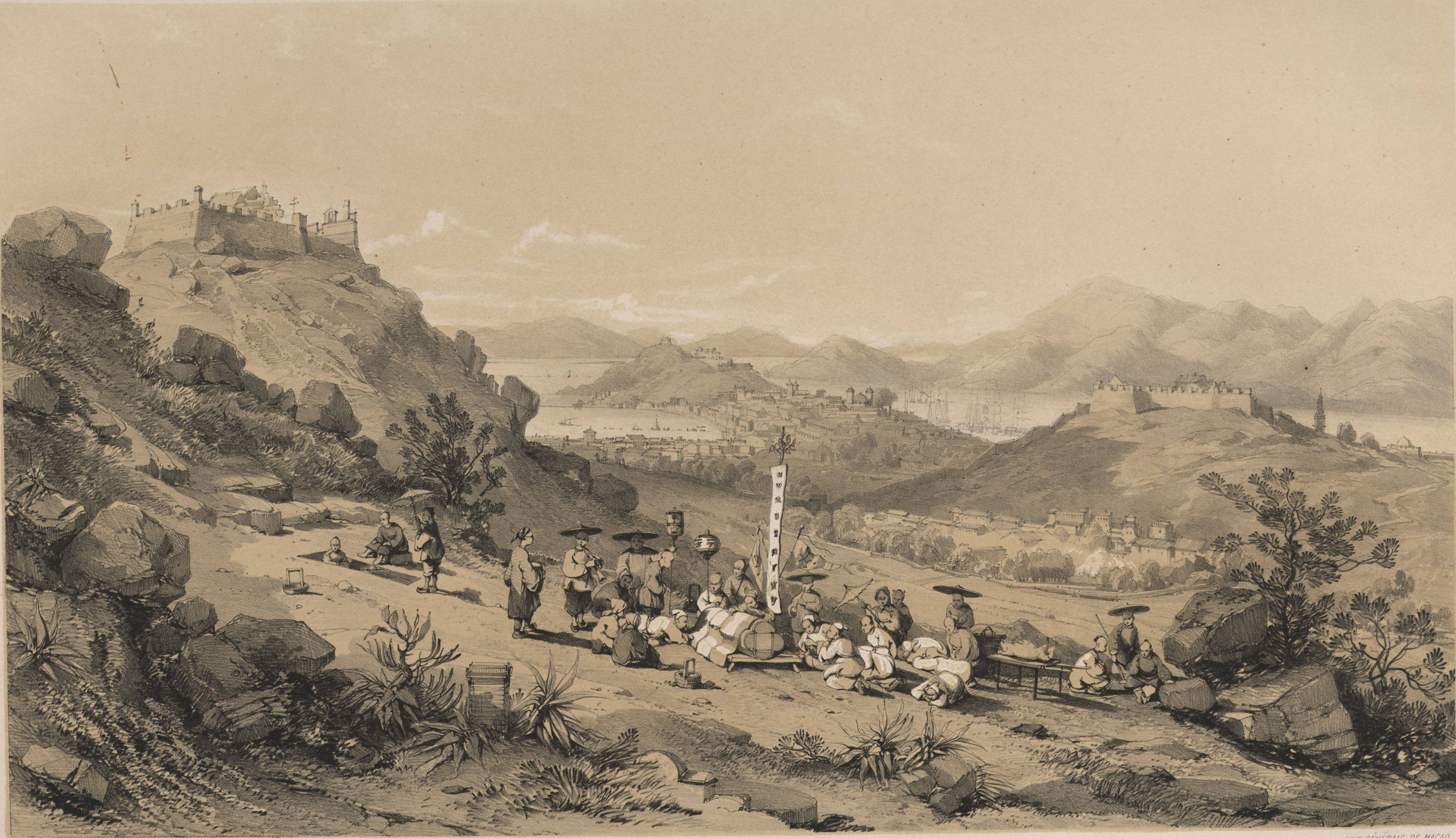
Auguste Borget's 1842 ''Macao from the Forts of Heang-shan''

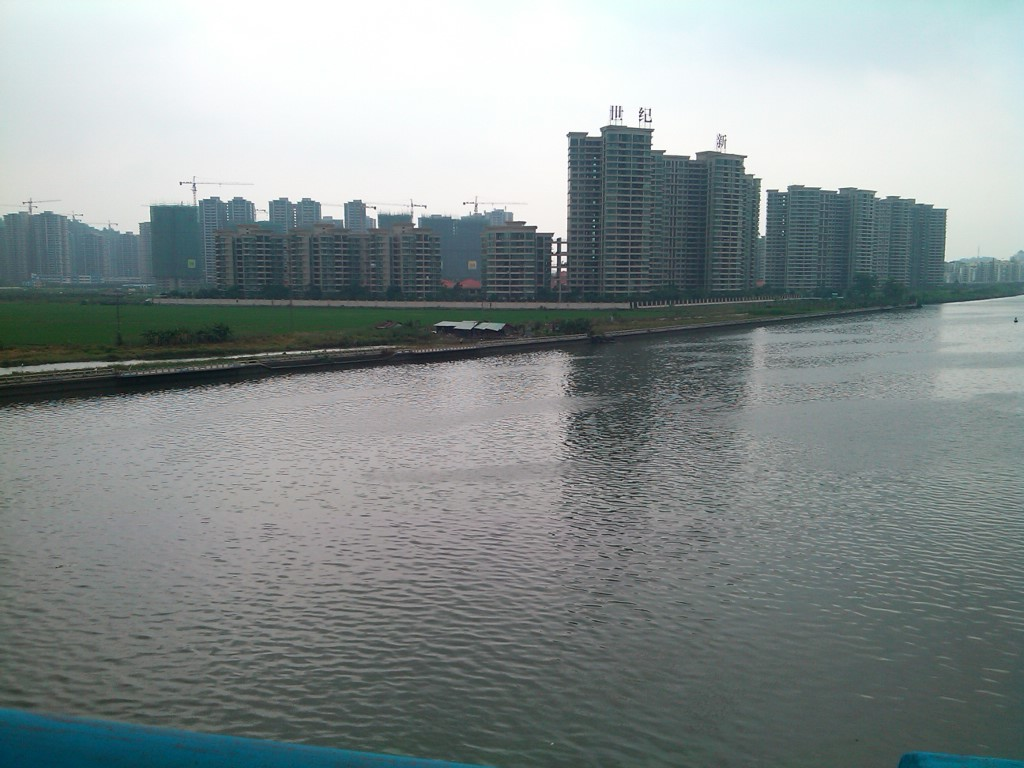
View of Zhongshan Island seen from the Zhujiang River Estuary.

The city of Zhongshan and the island are named for Sun Yat-sen, who used the pseudonym 中山樵 (Nakayama Kikori) in Japanese, the first two characters are 中山 (Zhōngshān) in Chinese.
