= Meteorological and Geophysical Bureau =

Weather service of Macau

- 澳門地球物理氣象局; Direcção dos Serviços Meteorológicos e Geofísicos

Agency overview
- Formed: 1952
- Preceding agency: Macao Meteorological and Geophysic Service (地球物理氣象服務)
- Headquarters: Taipa Grande, Taipa, Macao
- Employees: 101
- Website: smg.gov.mo

Meteorological and Geophysical Bureau

Chinese name
- Traditional Chinese: 地球物理氣象局
Transcriptions
Standard Mandarin
- Hanyu Pinyin: Dìqiú Wùlǐ Qìxiàng Jú
Yue: Cantonese
- Jyutping: dei6 kau4 mat6 lei5 hei3 zoeng6 guk6

Portuguese name
- Portuguese: Direcção dos Serviços Meteorológicos e Geofísicos

The Meteorological and Geophysical Bureau (SMG, Chinese: 地球物理氣象局; Portuguese: Direcção dos Serviços Meteorológicos e Geofísicos) is a department of the Macao Government. It provides weather forecasts and issues warnings on weather-related hazards. It also provides geophysical-related services to meet the needs of the public and the shipping, aviation, industrial and engineering sectors.

== Overview ==
The Meteorologic and Geophysic Services was established in 1952 as a government agency after taking over the role from the Portuguese Navy. Meteorological data had been recorded in Macau since 1861 with online data back to 1901. It was renamed the Meteorological and Geophysical Bureau following the handover in 1999.

== Services ==
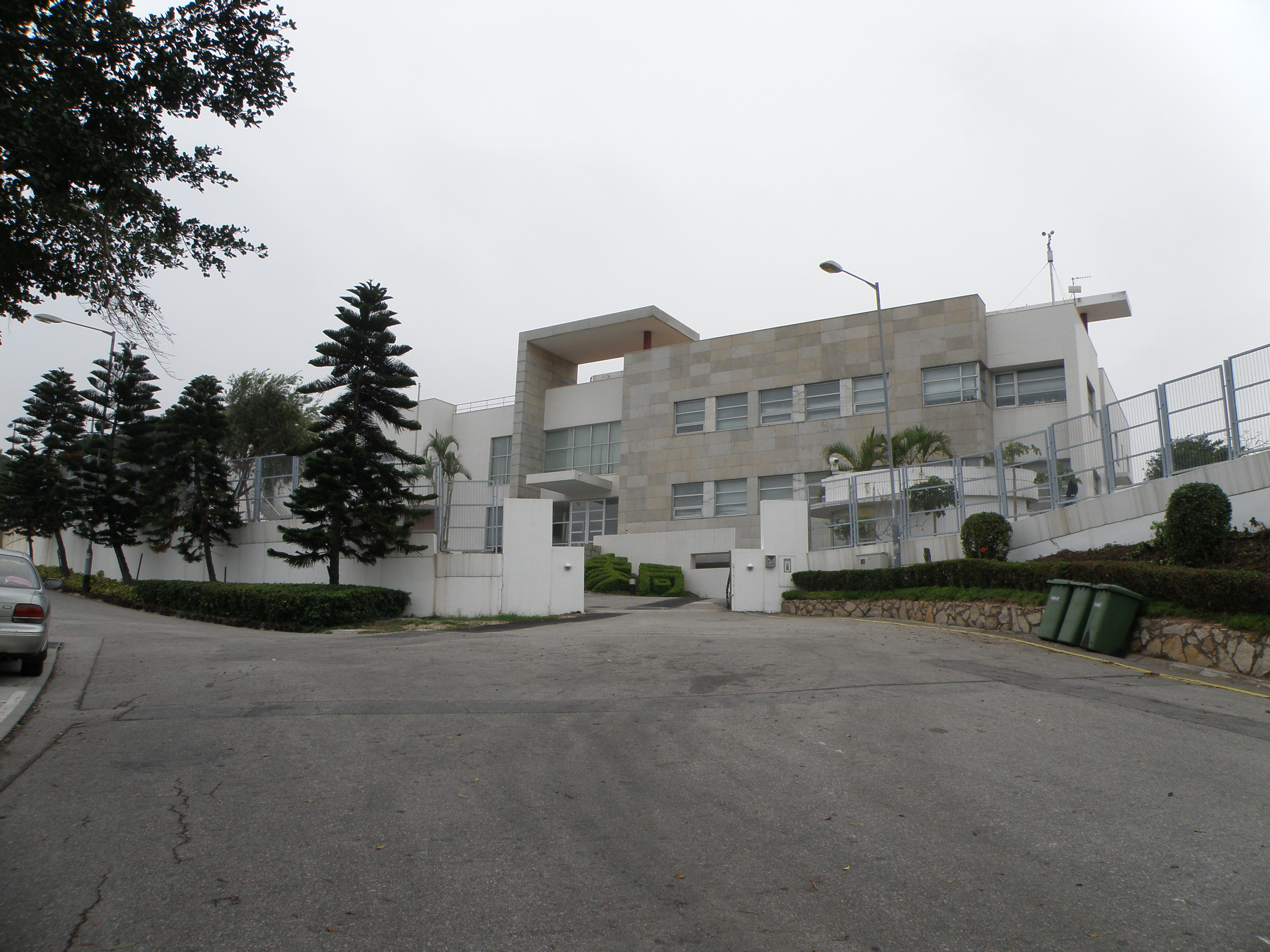
Headquarter of the Macao Meteorological and Geophysical Bureau

- Meteorological Monitoring
- Seismological Monitoring
- Climate & Atmospheric Environment
- Telecommunications & Processing

== Buildings in the Observatory ==
The SMG's headquarters and observatory is located at Rampa do Observatório on Taipa Grande.

== See also ==
- Hong Kong rainstorm warning signals
- Hong Kong tropical cyclone warning signals
- China Meteorological Administration
- Hong Kong Observatory
- Central Weather Bureau (Taiwan)
