= Matsuyama (disambiguation) =

Matsuyama is the capital city of Ehime Prefecture, Japan.

Matsuyama may also refer to:

== Places ==
- Matsuyama, Kagoshima, a former town in Soo District in Kagoshima Prefecture, Japan
- Matsuyama, Miyagi, a town in Shida District in Miyagi Prefecture, Japan
- Matsuyama Town, which changed its name to Higashimatsuyama, Saitama on 1 July 1954
- Matsuyama, Yamagata, a town in Akumi District in Yamagata Prefecture, Japan
- Matsuyama, Taihoku or Songshan District, a district in Taipei, Taiwan

== Other uses ==
- Matsuyama (surname)

== See also ==
- 松山 (disambiguation)
