= Masuyama =

Masuyama (written: 増山, 益山 or 桝山) is a Japanese surname. People with this surname include:

- Motosaburo Masuyama (増山 元三郎, 1912–2005), Japanese statistician
- Eiko Masuyama (増山 江威子, born 1936), Japanese voice actress
- Tsukasa Masuyama (益山 司, born 1990), Japanese footballer

== See also ==
- Matsuyama (disambiguation)
