= Luoyuan County =

Luoyuan 罗源县 Loyuan; Loyüan
- County
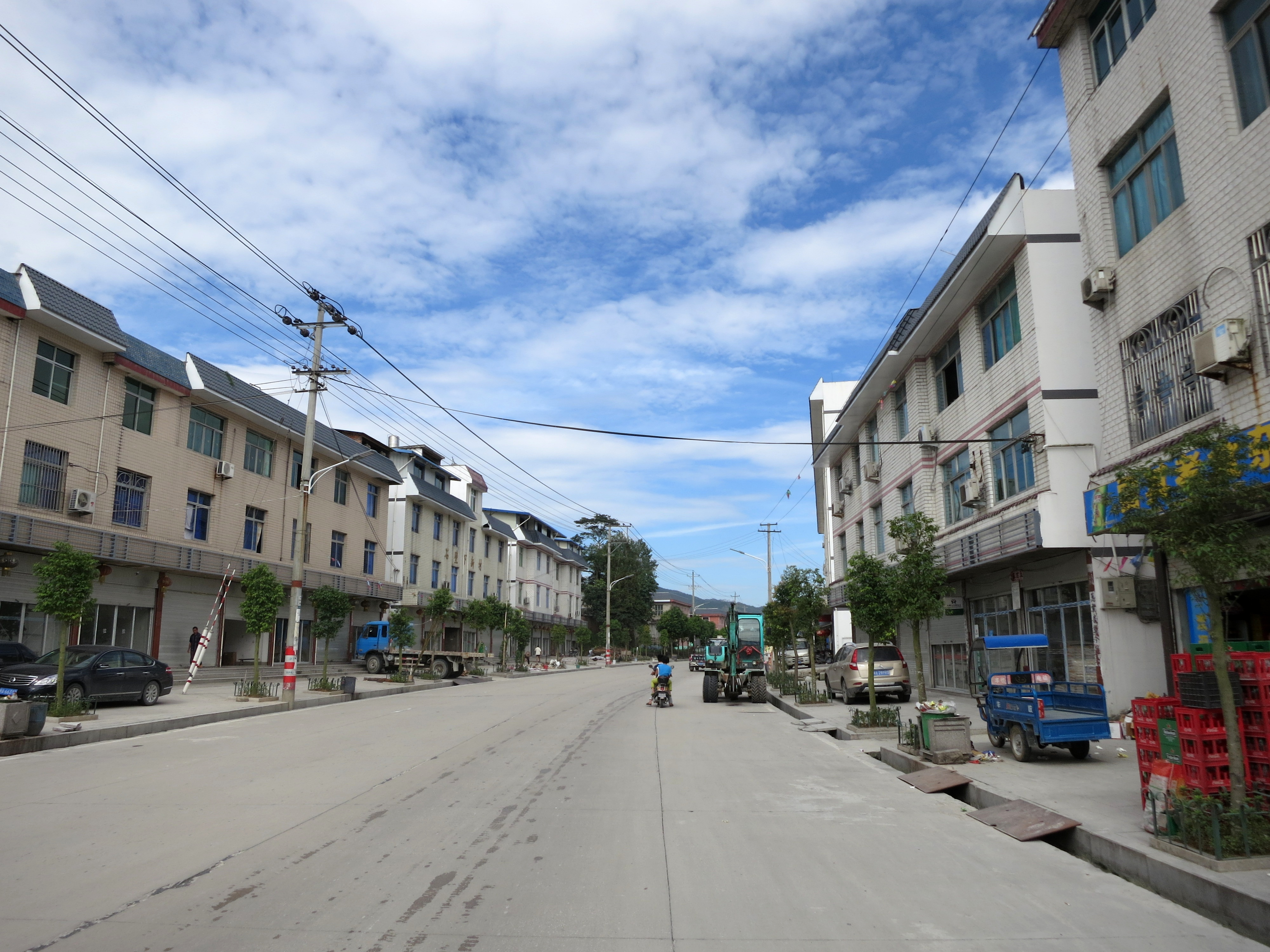
- Xilan Township in 2015

- Location in Fujian
- Coordinates: 26°30′N 119°33′E
- Country: People's Republic of China
- Province: Fujian
- Prefecture-level city: Fuzhou
- Seat: Fengshan

Area
  - Total: 1,187 km^{2} (458 sq mi)

Population (2020)
  - Total: 255,214
  - Density: 215.0/km^{2} (556.9/sq mi)
- Time zone: UTC+8 (China Standard)

Luoyuan County (simplified Chinese: 罗源; traditional Chinese: 羅源; pinyin: Luóyuán; Foochow Romanized: Lò̤-nguòng) is a county on the northeast coast of Fujian Province, China. It is under the administration of the prefecture-level city of Fuzhou, the provincial capital. The county spans an area of 1,187 square kilometers, and has a population of approximately 255,214 as of 2020. The county's administrative center is the town of Fengshan.

== Administrative divisions ==
Luoyuan County administers 6 towns, 4 townships, and 1 ethnic township.

The county's 6 towns are Fengshan, Songshan, Qibu, Zhongfang, Feizhu, and Jianjiang.

The county's 4 townships are Baita Township, Hongyang Township, Xilan Township, and Bili Township.

The county's sole ethnic township is Huokou She Ethnic Township.

== Climate ==
Climate data for Luoyuan, elevation 79 m (259 ft), (1991–2020 normals, extremes 1981–present)
| Month | Jan | Feb | Mar | Apr | May | Jun | Jul | Aug | Sep | Oct | Nov | Dec | Year |
|---|---|---|---|---|---|---|---|---|---|---|---|---|---|
| Record high °C (°F) | 27.5 (81.5) | 31.2 (88.2) | 32.2 (90.0) | 33.4 (92.1) | 37.5 (99.5) | 38.4 (101.1) | 39.6 (103.3) | 38.5 (101.3) | 38.0 (100.4) | 33.7 (92.7) | 31.7 (89.1) | 26.4 (79.5) | 39.6 (103.3) |
| Mean daily maximum °C (°F) | 14.7 (58.5) | 15.4 (59.7) | 18.1 (64.6) | 22.9 (73.2) | 26.9 (80.4) | 30.4 (86.7) | 33.6 (92.5) | 33.0 (91.4) | 30.4 (86.7) | 26.4 (79.5) | 22.0 (71.6) | 17.1 (62.8) | 24.2 (75.6) |
| Daily mean °C (°F) | 10.5 (50.9) | 11.1 (52.0) | 13.5 (56.3) | 18.0 (64.4) | 22.4 (72.3) | 26.1 (79.0) | 28.9 (84.0) | 28.3 (82.9) | 26.0 (78.8) | 21.9 (71.4) | 17.7 (63.9) | 12.7 (54.9) | 19.8 (67.6) |
| Mean daily minimum °C (°F) | 7.7 (45.9) | 8.2 (46.8) | 10.4 (50.7) | 14.6 (58.3) | 19.1 (66.4) | 23.0 (73.4) | 25.3 (77.5) | 25.0 (77.0) | 22.8 (73.0) | 18.6 (65.5) | 14.6 (58.3) | 9.6 (49.3) | 16.6 (61.8) |
| Record low °C (°F) | −1.3 (29.7) | −1.5 (29.3) | −0.4 (31.3) | 5.6 (42.1) | 9.4 (48.9) | 14.8 (58.6) | 19.7 (67.5) | 20.3 (68.5) | 15.1 (59.2) | 9.0 (48.2) | 3.2 (37.8) | −3.4 (25.9) | −3.4 (25.9) |
| Average precipitation mm (inches) | 63.1 (2.48) | 82.8 (3.26) | 138.8 (5.46) | 136.9 (5.39) | 202.3 (7.96) | 268.5 (10.57) | 193.8 (7.63) | 279.9 (11.02) | 165.3 (6.51) | 66.4 (2.61) | 63.4 (2.50) | 53.3 (2.10) | 1,714.5 (67.49) |
| Average precipitation days (≥ 0.1 mm) | 12.4 | 15.0 | 18.3 | 16.4 | 18.1 | 17.9 | 12.6 | 16.1 | 13.7 | 8.4 | 9.8 | 10.5 | 169.2 |
| Average snowy days | 0.1 | 0.2 | 0 | 0 | 0 | 0 | 0 | 0 | 0 | 0 | 0 | 0.1 | 0.4 |
| Average relative humidity (%) | 79 | 80 | 81 | 80 | 81 | 83 | 79 | 80 | 77 | 73 | 75 | 76 | 79 |
| Mean monthly sunshine hours | 94.0 | 84.6 | 98.1 | 116.0 | 128.4 | 136.1 | 220.7 | 192.0 | 157.0 | 155.1 | 108.3 | 107.2 | 1,597.5 |
| Percentage possible sunshine | 28 | 27 | 26 | 30 | 31 | 33 | 53 | 48 | 43 | 44 | 34 | 33 | 36 |
Source: China Meteorological Administration All-time May extremes

== Transportation ==
The Wenzhou–Fuzhou railway and National Highway 104 both run through the county.
