= Alto de Coloane =

Highest point of Macau

Alto de Coloane 疊石塘山
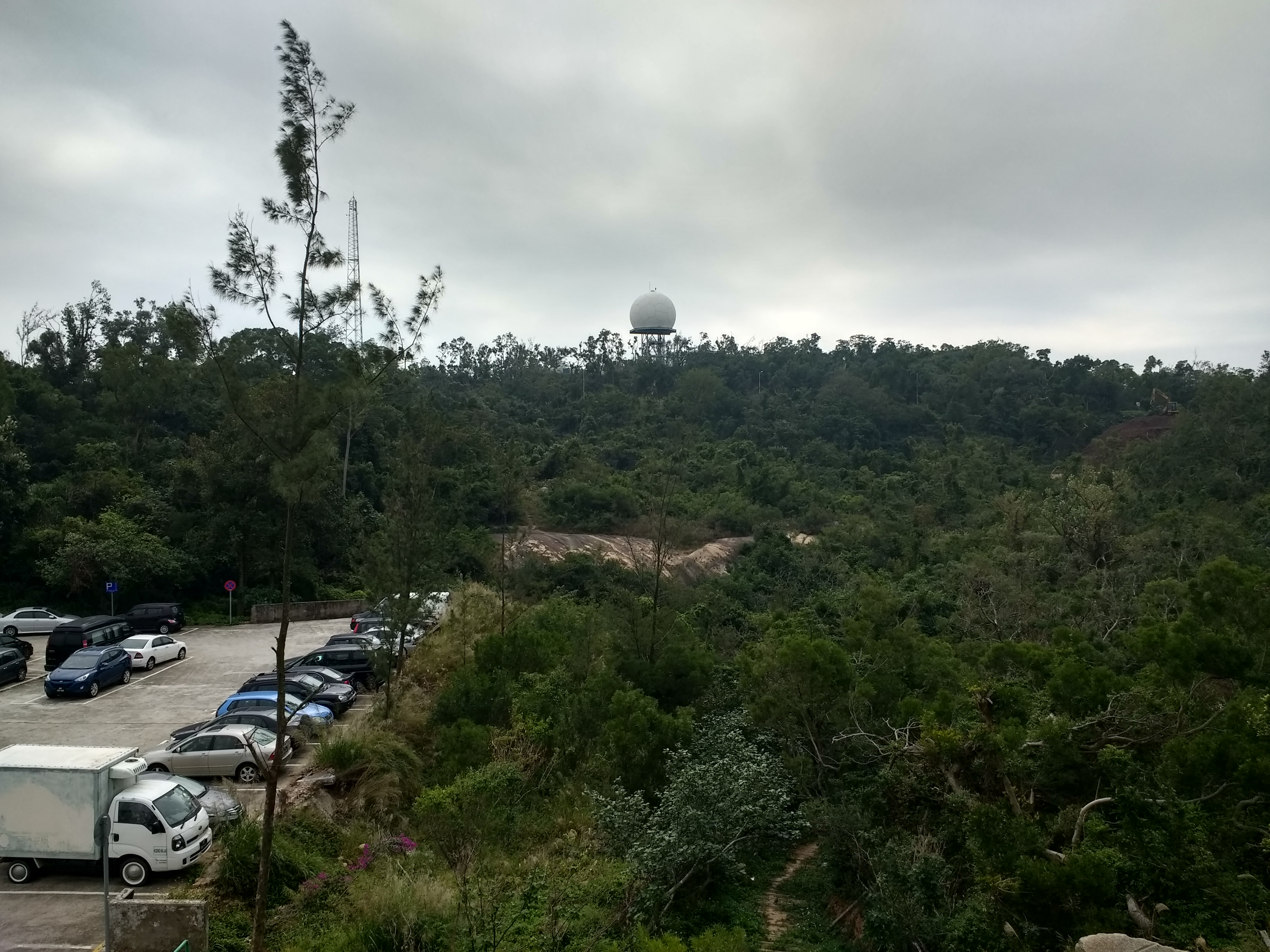

Highest point
- Elevation: 172.4 m (566 ft)
- Prominence: 172.4 m (566 ft)
- Coordinates: 22°07′15″N 113°33′41″E

Geography
- Location within Macau
- Location: Coloane, Macau

Alto de Coloane (Chinese: 疊石塘山; Cantonese Yale: Daahpsehk Tòhngsāan; pinyin: Diéshí Tángshān, Portuguese: Alto de Coloane) is the highest point of Macau. The 172.4 m-tall (566 ft) mountain is located on the island of Coloane. It has a statue of A-Ma.

== See also ==
- Geography of Macau
