= Huokou She Ethnic Township =

Huokou She Ethnic Township 霍口畲族乡
- Ethnic township
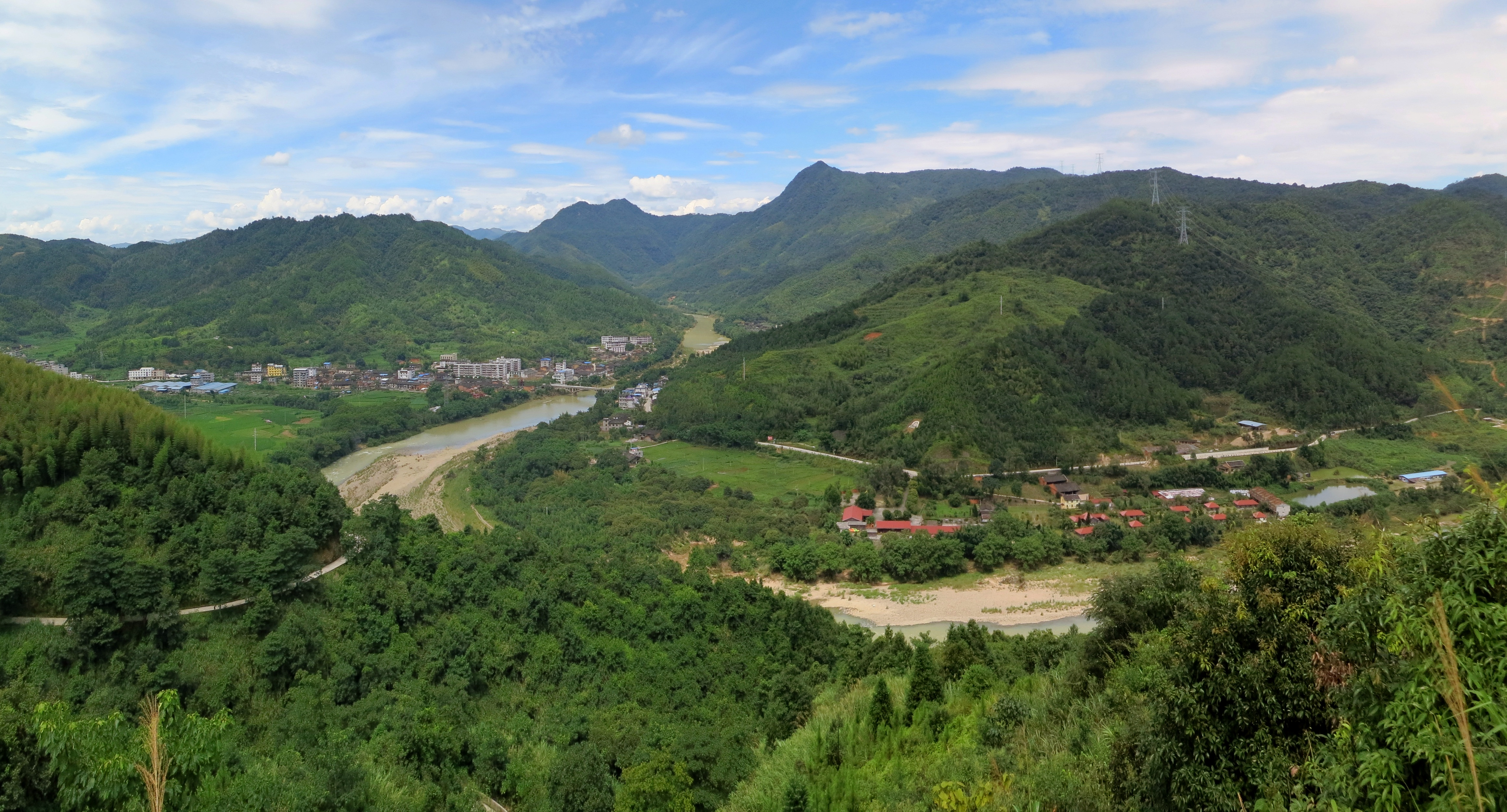
- Overlooking Huokou She Ethnic Township
- Interactive map of Huokou She Ethnic Township
- Country: China
- Province: Fujian
- Prefecture-level city: Fuzhou
- County: Luoyuan County

Area
  - Total: 197.56 km^{2} (76.28 sq mi)

Population (2018)
  - Total: 20,387
  - Density: 103.19/km^{2} (267.27/sq mi)

Huokou She Ethnic Township is an ethnic township of Luoyuan County, Fuzhou, Fujian province, China. The ethnic township spans an area of 197.56 square kilometres (76.28 mi^{2}), and has a population of 20,387 as of 2018.

== Administrative divisions ==
Huokou She Ethnic Township is divided into 24 administrative villages.

== Gallery ==
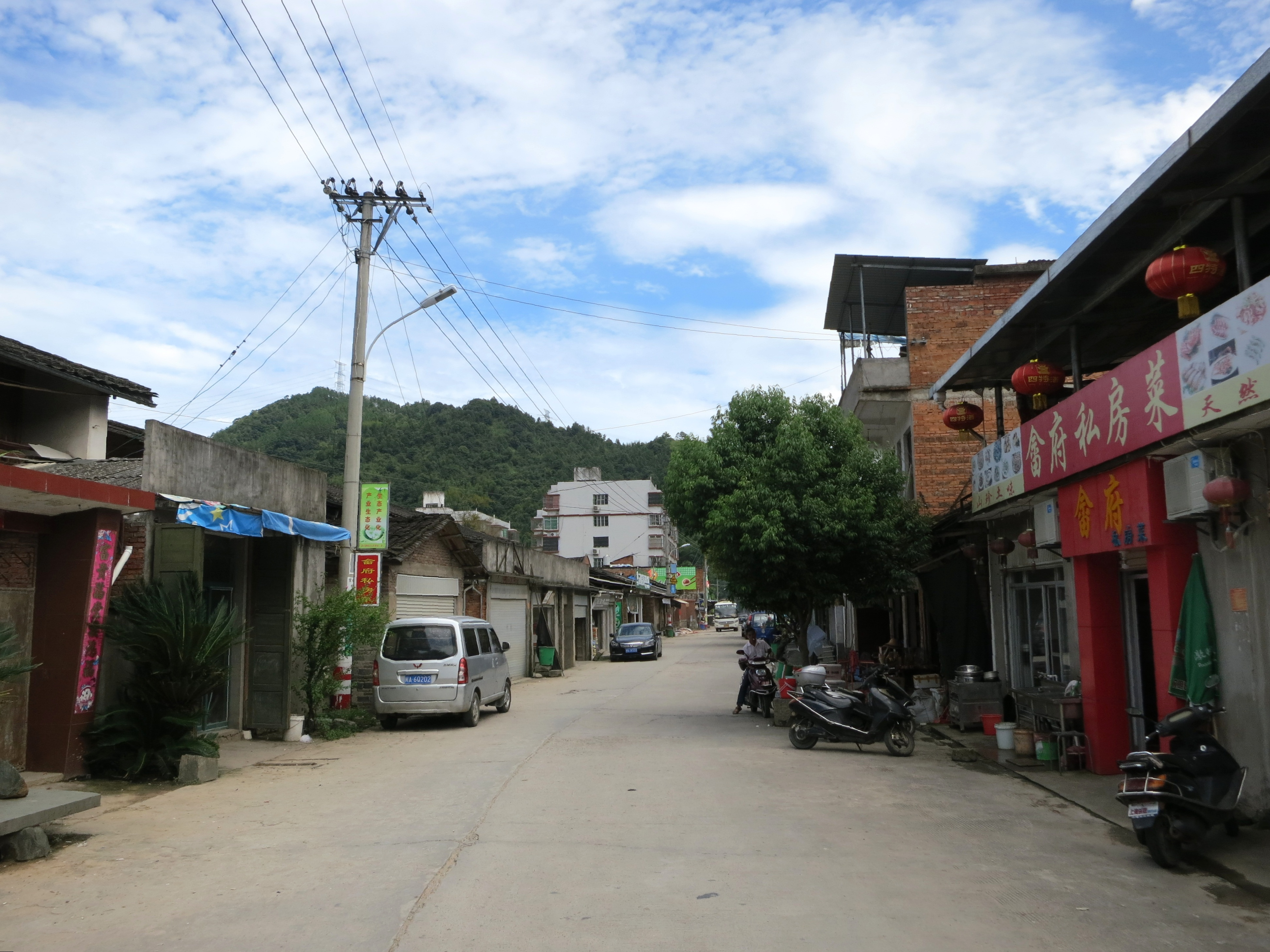
A street in Huokou

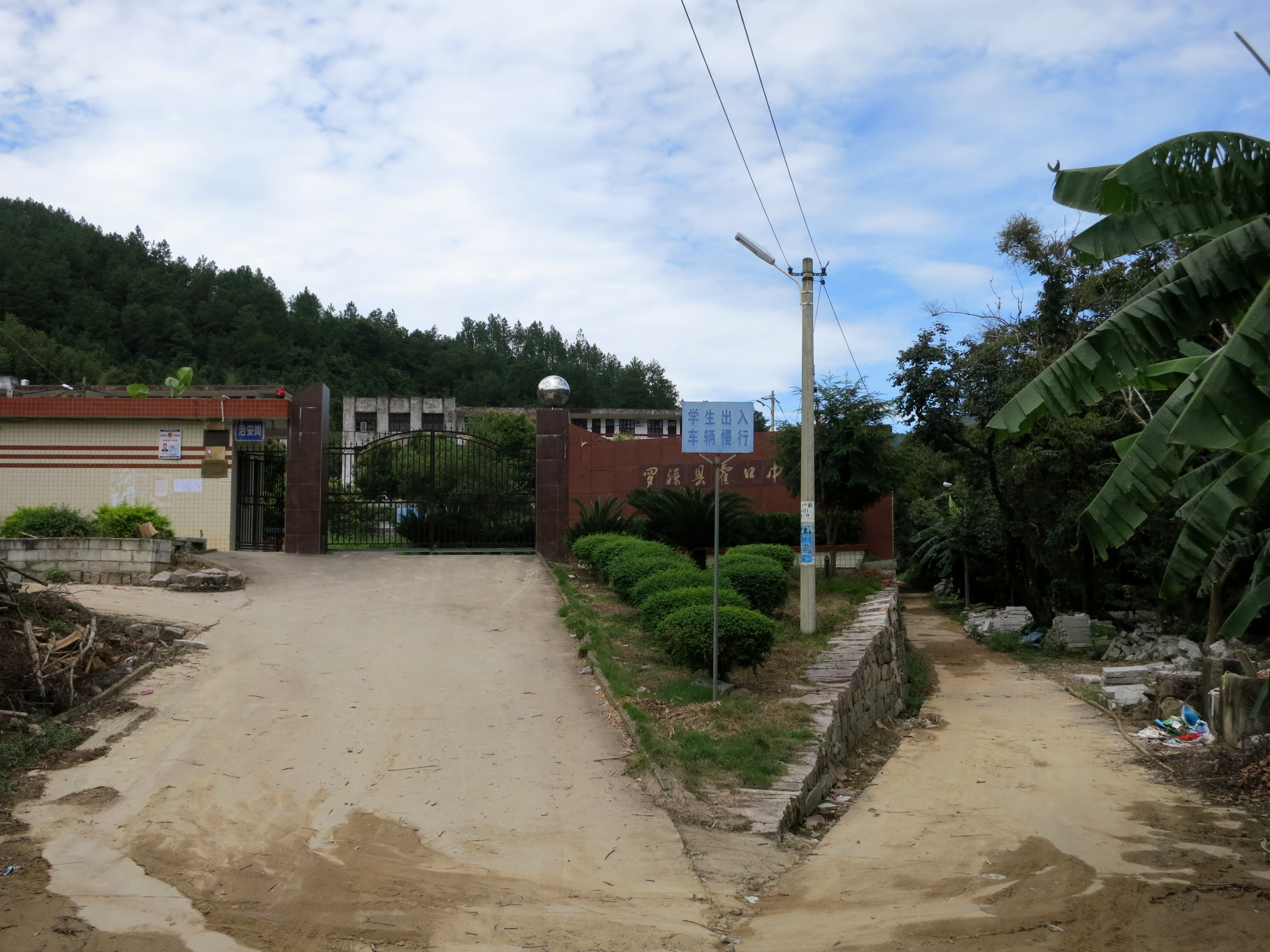
Huokou Middle School

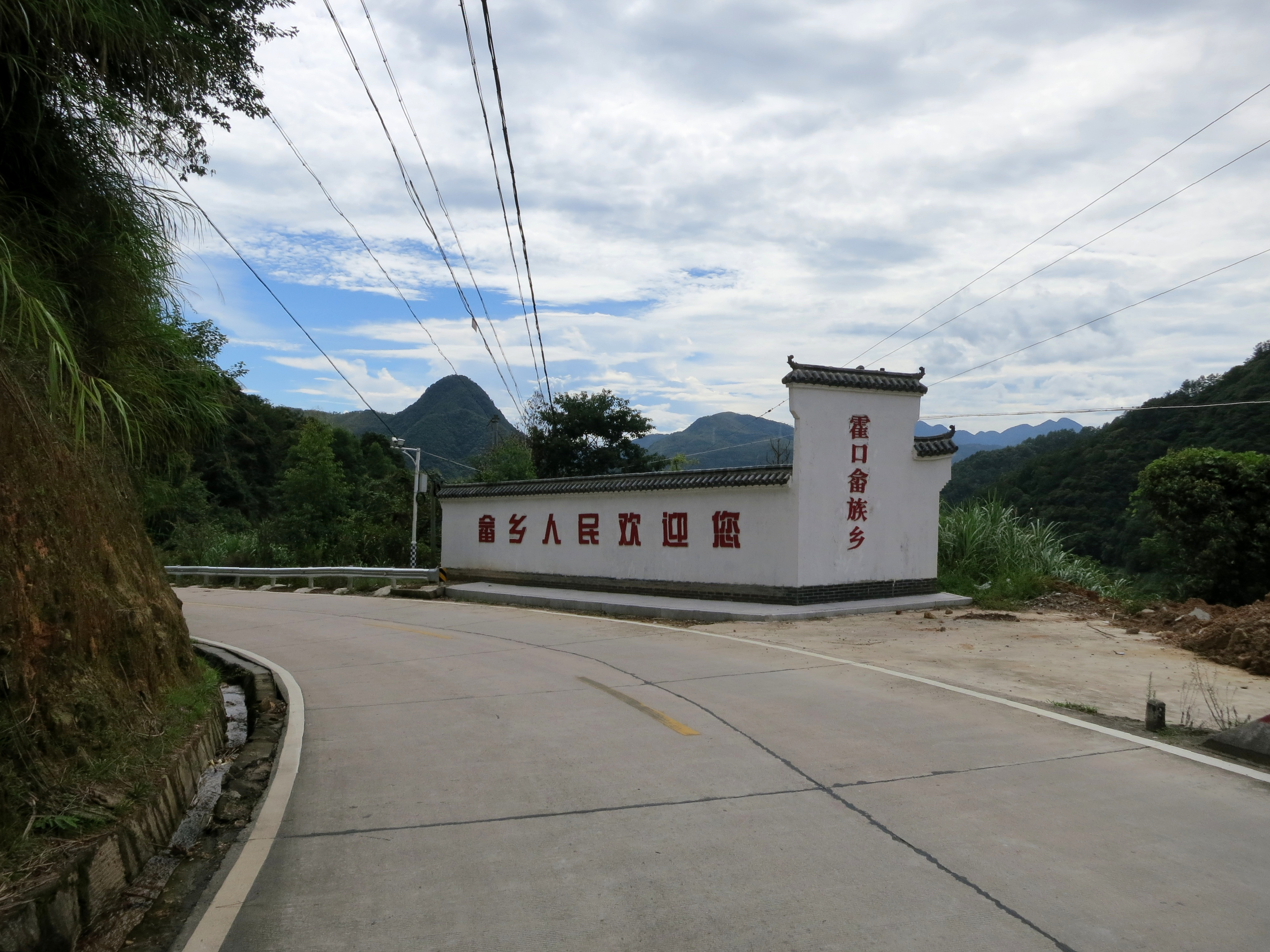
A sign welcoming visitors to Huokou

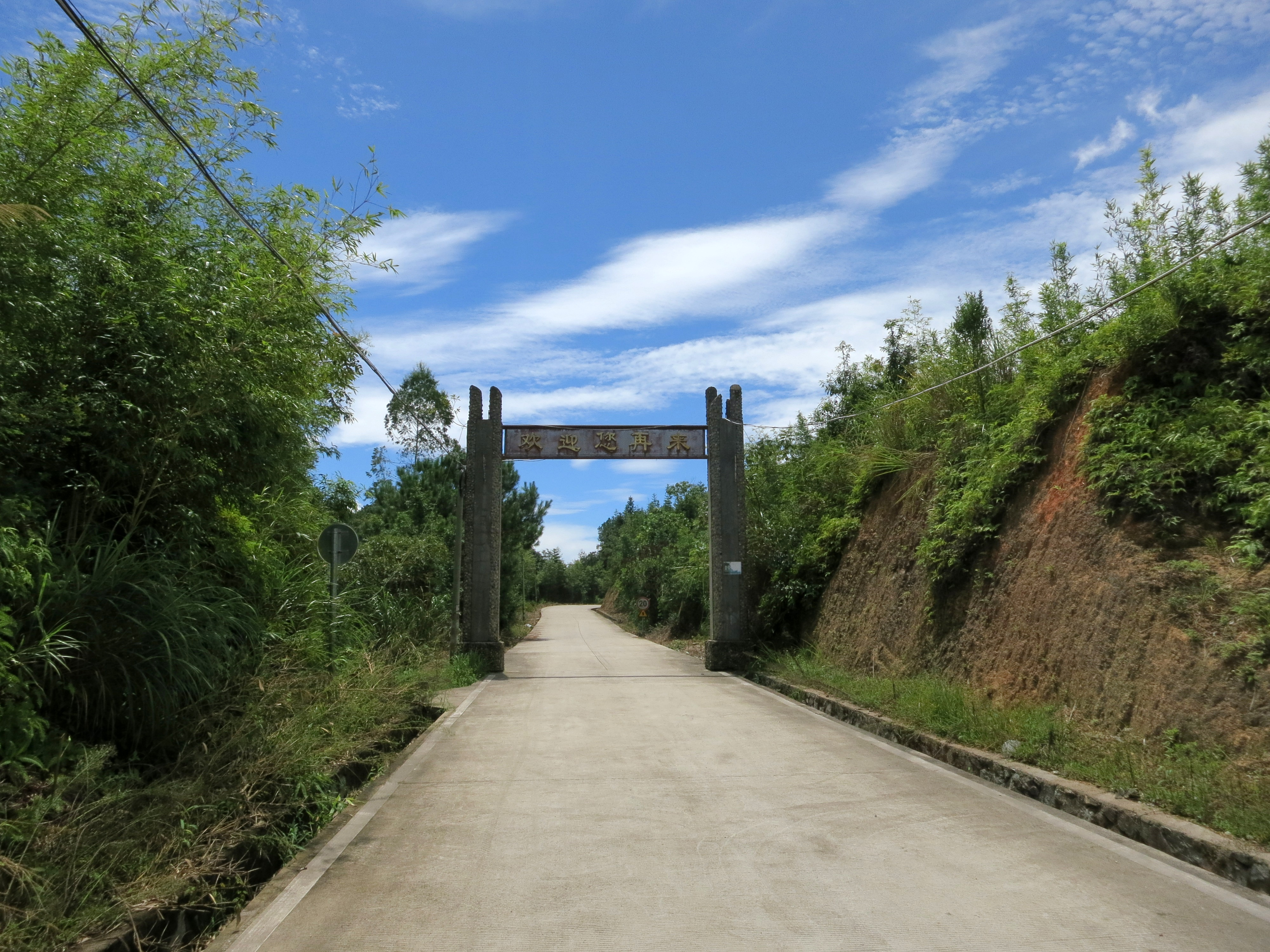
The boundary of Huokou

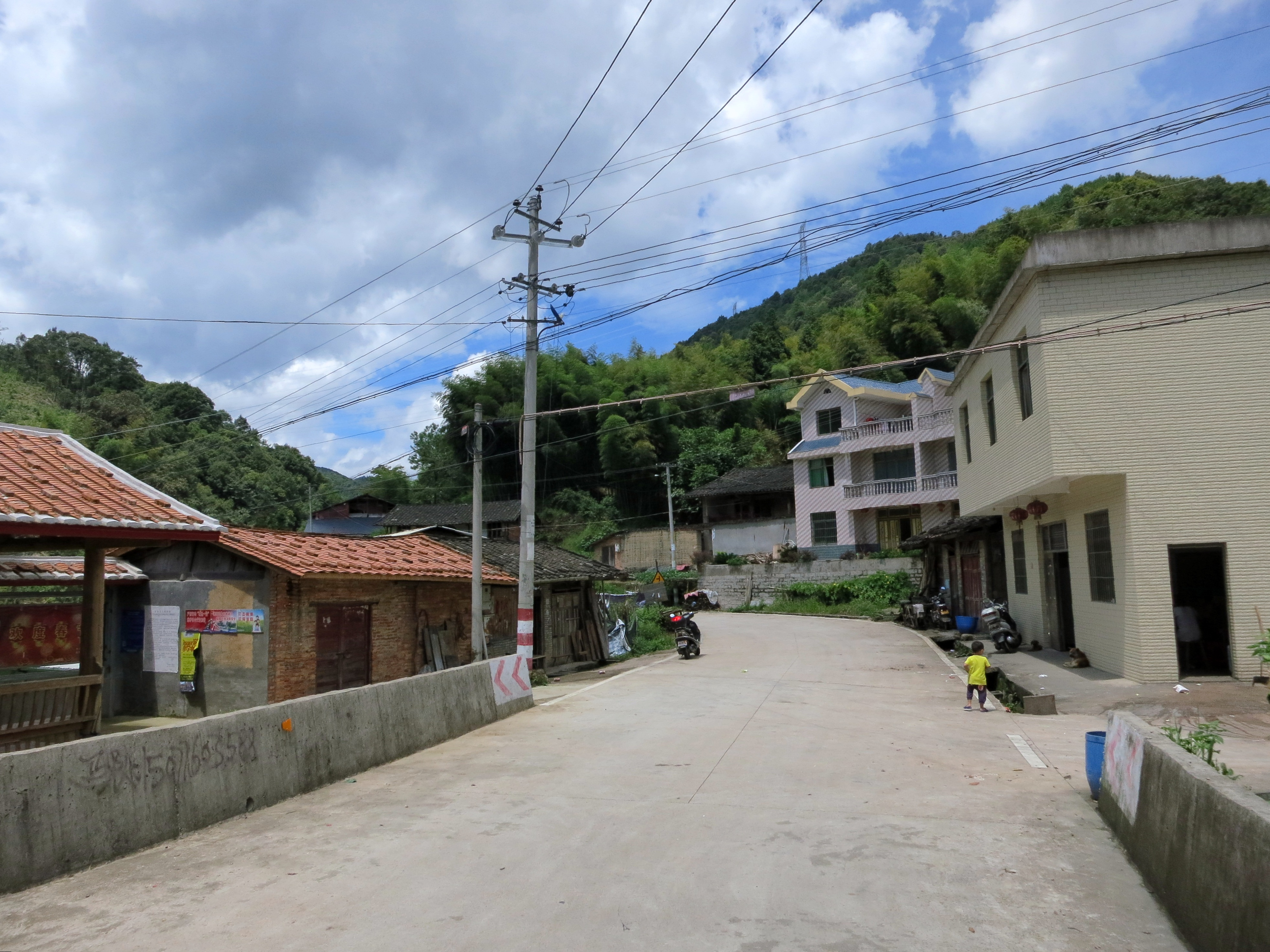
Dongyuanting Village in Huokou

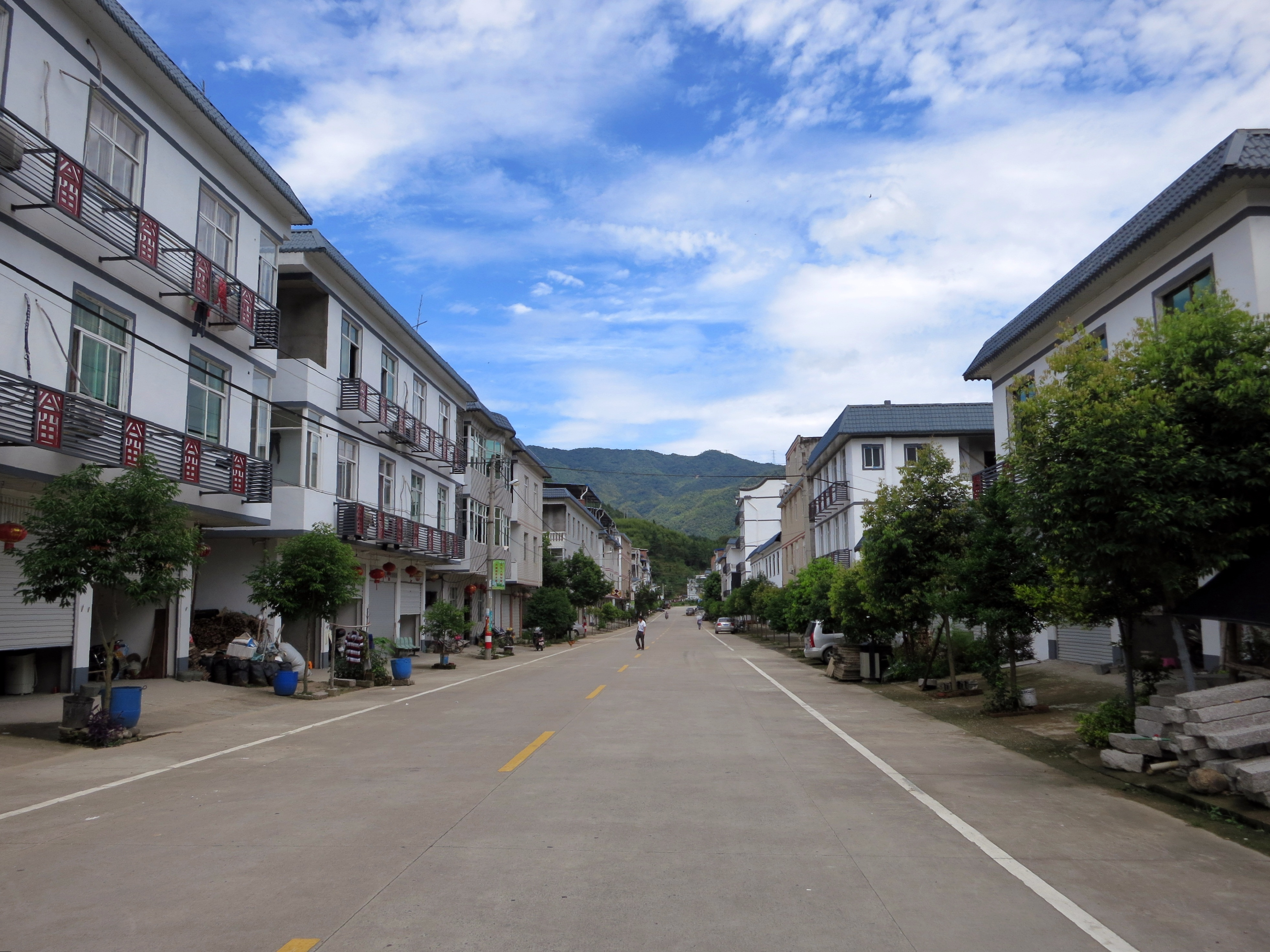
Shanlongwan Village in Huokou

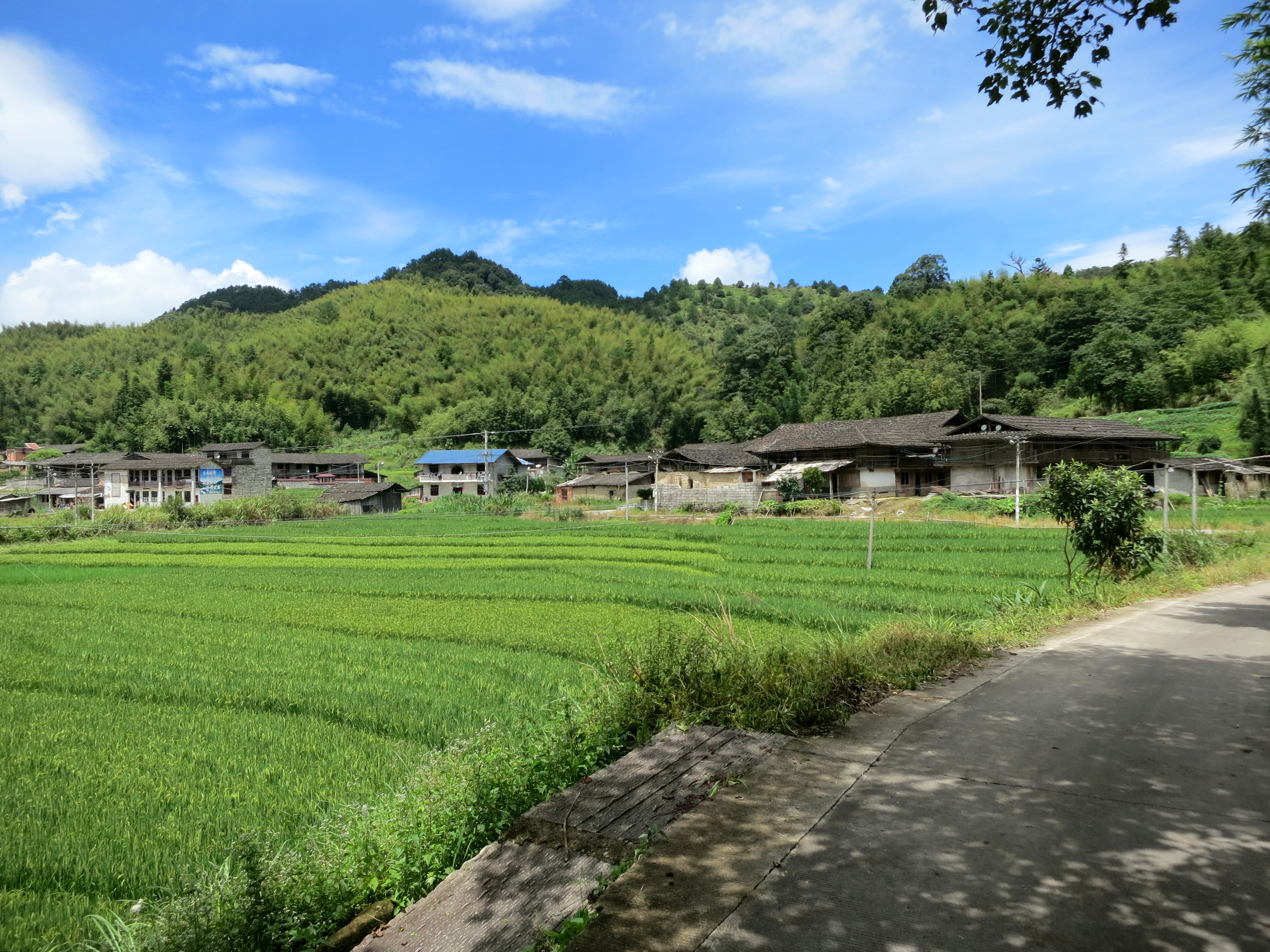
Qifeng Village in Huokou

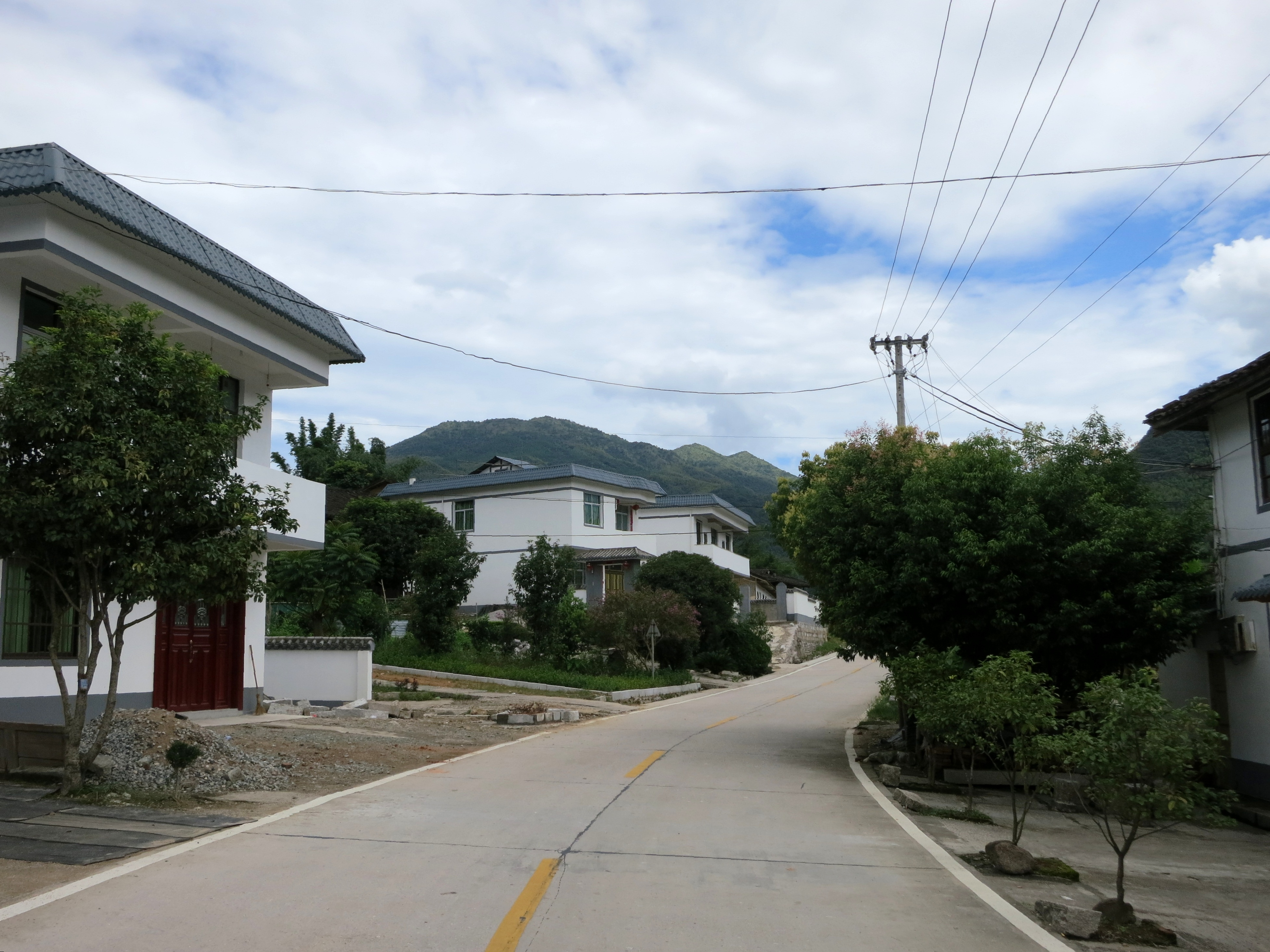
Xiqian Village in Huokou

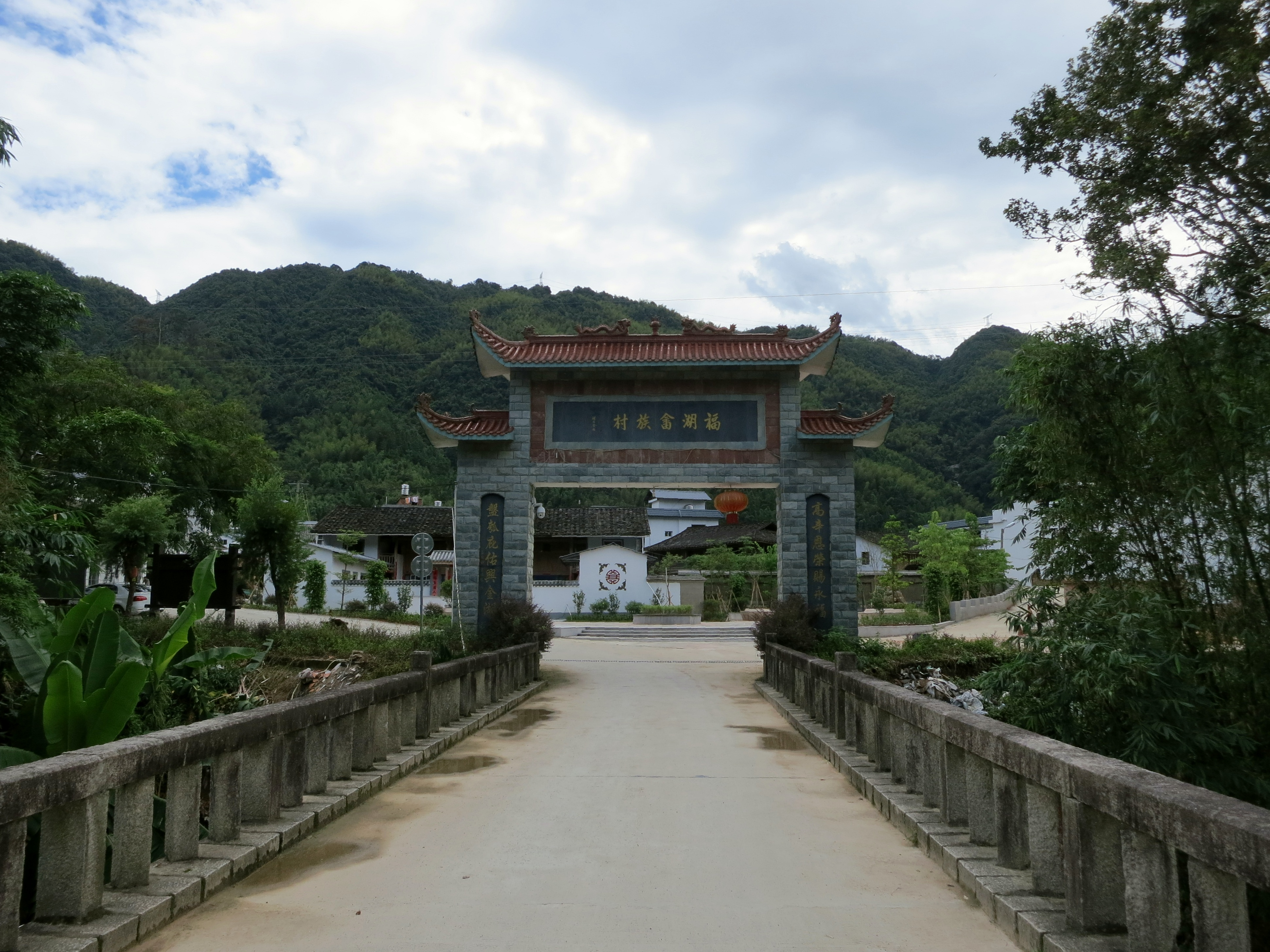
Fuhu Village in Huokou

== See also ==
- List of township-level divisions of Fujian
