= Ilha Verde hill =

Hill in Macau

Ilha Verde hill 青洲山
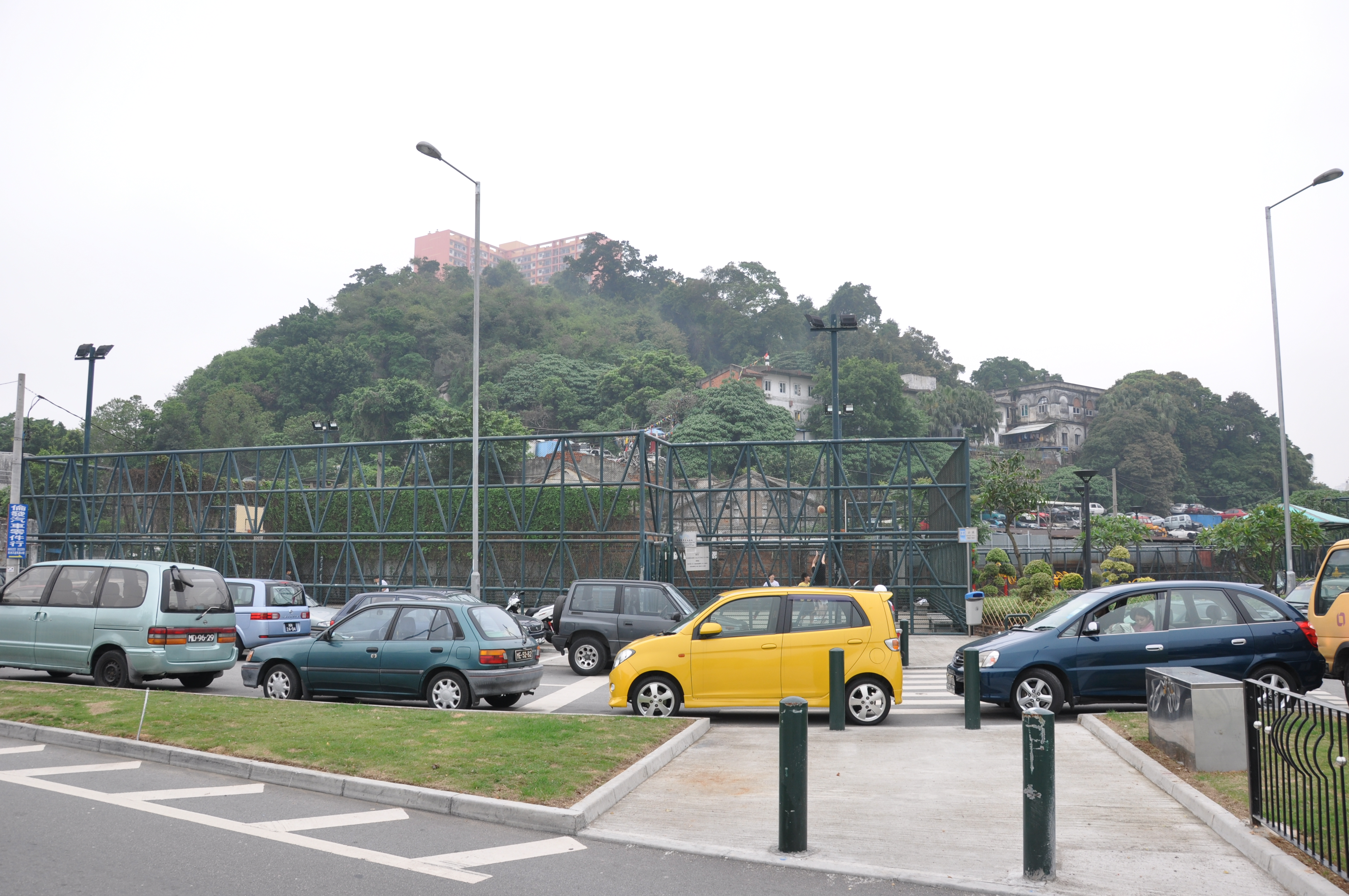

Highest point
- Elevation: 54.5 m (179 ft)
- Coordinates: 22°12′42″N 113°32′15″E

Geography
- Location within Macau
- Location: Ilha Verde, Macau

Ilha Verde hill (Chinese: 青洲山), also known as Qinzhou Hill, is located in Ilha Verde, Macau, with an elevation of 54.5 meters.

== History ==
Ilha Verde hill was once an island located to the northwest of the Macau Peninsula. The Portuguese later connected it to the peninsula by land reclamation. In the early 17th century, the Portuguese church constructed buildings on Ilha Verde hill, including villas in Southern European style that are still preserved today. In 1865, taking advantage of the hill's strategic location, the Portuguese built military installations such as fortifications, artillery batteries, and outposts.

== See also ==
- Geography of Macau
