= Taipa Grande =

Hill in Macau

Taipa Grande 大潭山
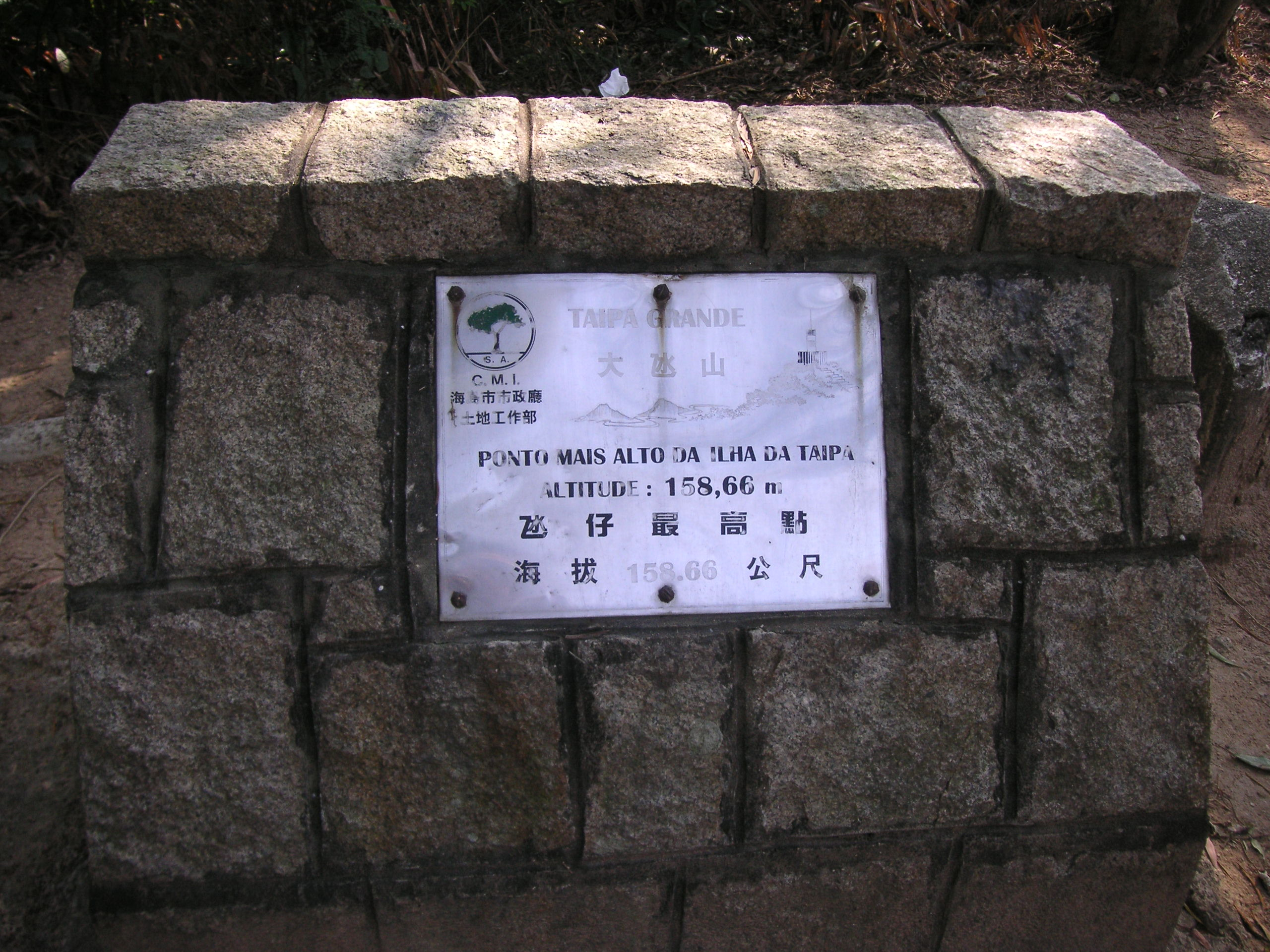

Highest point
- Elevation: 158 m (518 ft)
- Coordinates: 22°9′30″N 113°33′57″E

Geography
- Location within Macau
- Location: Taipa, Macau

Taipa Grande (Chinese: 大潭山; pinyin: Dàtán Shān) is a hill located in Macau. The 158 m (518 ft)-tall hill is located on the island of Taipa.

== See also ==
- Geography of Macau
