= Matsuyama (surname) =

Matsuyama (written: 松山, lit. "pine tree mountain") is a Japanese surname. Notable people with the surname include:

- Hideki Matsuyama (松山 英樹; born 1992), Japanese golfer
- Kazuoki Matsuyama (松山 和興; born 1942), Japanese sailor
- Kenichi Matsuyama (松山 研; born 1985), Japanese actor
- Kinrei Matsuyama (松山 金嶺; 1900–1953), Japanese billiards player
- Motonori Matsuyama (松山 基範; 1884–1958), Japanese geophysicist
- Mitsuharu Matsuyama (松山 光治; 1891–1959), senior officer in the Imperial Japanese Navy during World War II
- Nami Matsuyama (松山 奈未; born 1998), Japanese badminton player
- Ryuhei Matsuyama (松山 竜平; born 1985), Japanese baseball player
- Sō Matsuyama (松山 崇; 1908–1977), Japanese production designer and art director
- Takashi Matsuyama (松山 鷹志; born 1960), Japanese actor and voice actor

== Fictional characters ==
- Peggy Matsuyama (ペギー松山), the Pink Ranger of Himitsu Sentai Gorenger

== See also ==
- Masuyama, a Japanese surname
