= Songshan, Fujian =

Songshan 松山镇
- Town
- Location in Fujian Songshan (China)
- Coordinates: 26°28′39″N 119°34′09″E
- Country: People's Republic of China
- Province: Fujian
- Prefecture-level city: Fuzhou
- County: Luoyuan
- Village-level divisions: 6 residential communities 16 villages
- Elevation: 7 m (23 ft)
- Time zone: UTC+8 (China Standard)
- Area code: 0591

Songshan (Chinese: 松山; pinyin: Sōngshān) is a town of Luoyuan County in northeastern Fujian province, People's Republic of China, located adjacent to and southeast of the county seat. As of 2011, it has six residential communities (居委会) and 16 villages under its administration.

== See also ==
- List of township-level divisions of Fujian
