= Songshan, Gansu =

Town in Gansu, China

Songshan 松山镇
- Town
- Location relative to Qinghai
- Coordinates: 36°58′01″N 103°17′21″E
- Country: People's Republic of China
- Province: Gansu
- Prefecture-level city: Wuwei
- Autonomous county: Tenzhu (Bairi)
- Village-level divisions: 1 residential community 15 villages
- Elevation: 2,543 m (8,343 ft)
- Time zone: UTC+8 (China Standard)
- Area code: 0935

Songshan (Chinese: 松山; pinyin: Sōngshān) is a town of Bairi (Tenzhu) Tibetan Autonomous County in southeastern Gansu province, China, located 13 km (8.1 mi) due east of the county seat. As of 2011, it has one residential community (社区) and 15 villages under its administration.

== See also ==
- List of township-level divisions of Gansu
