= Songshan, Guangxi =

Songshan 松山镇
- Town
- Interactive map of Songshan
- Coordinates: 22°59′21″N 110°27′33″E
- Country: People's Republic of China
- Region: Guangxi
- Prefecture-level city: Yulin
- County: Rong
- Village-level divisions: 13 villages
- Elevation: 189 m (620 ft)
- Time zone: UTC+8 (China Standard)
- Area code: 0775

Songshan (Chinese: 松山; pinyin: Sōngshān) is a town of Rong County in eastern Guangxi, China, located 17 kilometres (11 mi) northwest of the county seat. As of 2011, it has 13 villages under its administration.

== See also ==
- List of township-level divisions of Guangxi
