= Guia Hill =

Hill in Macau, China

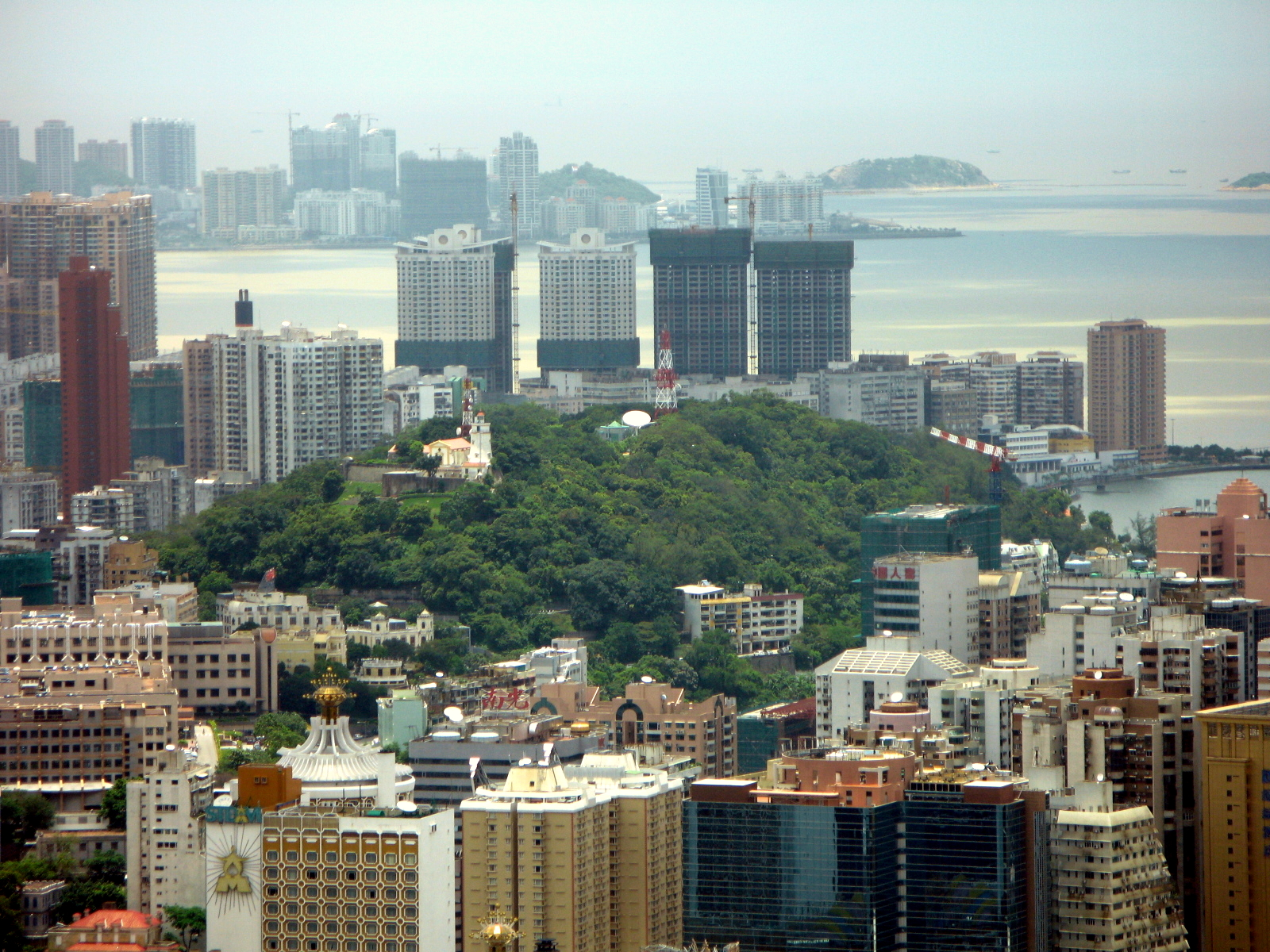
- Guia Hill (2008)

Highest point
- Elevation: 91.6 m (301 ft)
- Coordinates: 22°11′57″N 113°33′08″E

Naming
- Native name: 松山 / 東望洋山 (Chinese); Colina da Guia (Portuguese)

Geography
- Location within Macau
- Location: São Lázaro, Macau

The Guia Hill (Chinese: 松山 / 東望洋山; Portuguese: Colina da Guia) is a hill in located in São Lázaro, Macau, with an elevation of 91.6 meters. Situated in the central part of the Macau Peninsula, it features a park, recreational trails, a cable car, and other facilities. Guia Fortress is also located on the summit of this mountain.

== Facility ==
=== Guia Hill Municipal Park ===
Built around Guia Hill, is a comprehensive park that is open to the public free of charge all day. The park is home to numerous ancient trees, making it one of the parks in Macau with the largest collection of old trees.

=== Guia Hill Cable Car ===
The Guia Hill Cable Car is a cable car system located on Guia Hill. It opened in 1997 and consists of nine cabins, helping passengers reach the summit in just 80 seconds.

=== Guia Fortress ===
Guia Fortress, the Chapel of Our Lady of the Snows, and the Lighthouse are located at the top of Guia Hill. These structures are recognized as a World Heritage Site by UNESCO. The construction began in 1622, with China's first modern lighthouse being added in 1865. Guia Fortress is regarded as a symbol of Macau's military, maritime, and religious culture.

== See also ==
- Geography of Macau
