= Songshan, Jilin =

Songshan 松山镇
- Town
- Location in Jilin
- Coordinates: 42°45′59″N 126°33′23″E
- Country: People's Republic of China
- Province: Jilin
- Prefecture-level city: Jilin City
- County-level city: Panshi
- Village-level divisions: 1 residential community 10 villages
- Elevation: 322 m (1,056 ft)
- Time zone: UTC+8 (China Standard)

Songshan (Chinese: 松山; pinyin: Sōngshān) is a town under the administration of Panshi City in southern Jilin province, China, situated 46 kilometres (29 mi) from downtown Panshi as the crow flies. In 2011, it had one residential community and ten villages under its administration.

Han (Chinese) predominate throughout the province, except in the Yianbian Korean Autonomous Prefecture that is contiguous with North Korea and has a large population of ethnic Koreans. Most of the Manchu (Man) live in the central part of the province, in the vicinity of Jilin and Sipingmunicipalities; in addition, the Yitong Man Autonomous County was established in 1988 some 45 miles (72 km) south of Changchun. A few Hui (Chinese Muslims) are distributed in the cities and towns of the province, and some Mongolians are to be found in the Baicheng and Songyuan area in northwestern Jilin.

== Location ==
Songshan is located in a province of China called Jilin. Cities, towns and places near Songshan include Jiangnan, Heishihchen, Heishi and Heishih. The closest major cities include Jilin, Changchun, Tieling and Yanji. Its coordinates are 42.7664° N, 126.5564° E.

== History ==
In early modern times the Jilin region was inhabited by groups of steppe and forest dwellers and was at times loosely united politically by leaders who presented tribute of furs, ginseng, and pearls at the court of the Ming明 emperors of China. In the late 16th century the Hurka tribe dominated the region before being defeated by the Manchu leader Nurhaci努尔哈赤. After the establishment of the Qing清, or Manchu, dynasty in 1644, the region was at first directly administered by a military governor posted in the town of Jilin, and the region was thereafter referred to as Jilin吉林.

Despite the Qing清 government policy of discouraging agricultural settlement in the Manchu homeland, large numbers of Han settlers from North China established farms in the region during the 18th century, a period of rapid population expansion in China proper. In 1799 the transition to an agricultural economy was officially recognized with the establishment of a prefectural government at Changchun长春 to administer the new settlements. In the late 19th century, economic development accelerated in Jilin吉林 with the building of railways and industries processing agricultural products. This development encouraged a new influx of Chinese settlers and led to conflict between Russia and Japanover economic interests in the area.

Jilin was created a province of Manchuria in 1907, near the end of the Qing dynasty, and was occupied by the Japanese army in 1931. The province became a part of the puppet state of Manchukuo, with Jilin city as the provincial capital. Just before Japan’s surrender to the Allies on Aug. 15, 1945, Soviet forces entered the region, dismantled key industrial installations, and removed them to the Soviet Union. Following the withdrawal of Soviet troops, Chinese Nationalists moved in, but by 1948 they had been driven out by Chinese communist forces.

Jilin province was subordinated under the Northeast Military Administrative Commission in 1950. In 1954 the province was enlarged through the addition of a strip of territory annexed from northern Liaoning (which at the time was part of the former Liaoxi province), including the cities of Siping, Liaoyuan, and Tonghua and a portion of Heilongjiang’s steppe district near Baicheng. The capital of the province also moved from Jilin to Changchun in the same year. After 1954, with the abolition of the regional government, the province came under direct administration of the central government.

== Education ==
Jilin’s educational facilities are well developed, with more than 30 universities and other post-secondary institutions. Notable among these are Jilin University吉林大学 (founded 1946) and North-east Normal University (1946), both in Changchun, and Yanbian University 延边大学(1949) in Yanji. Overall literacy rates are significantly higher than the national average, as is the proportion of the population with at least a primary level education. Medical services are provided by hospitals and clinics staffed by medical workers, including doctors and practitioners of Chinese medicine.

== Plants and Animal Life ==
The natural vegetation is prairie grass in the western plains and mixed conifer and broad-leaved deciduous forest in the eastern mountainous area. The vegetation in the eastern mountains includes tree species such as the Japanese red pine, Manchurian ash, fish-scale pine, larch, birch, oak, willow, elm, and the Manchurian walnut. In the deep mountain interior, virgin forest has been preserved. Tree types are distributed in distinct belts depending mainly on elevation: between 800 and 1,600 feet (240 and 490 metres) is the deciduous broad-leaved belt, mainly mountain willows and oaks; a mixed coniferous and broad-leaved forest is found between 1,600 and 3,000 feet (490 and 910 metres); between 3,000 and 5,900 feet (910 and 1,800 metres) there is coniferous forest; and mountain birch is found from 5,900 to 6,900 feet (1,800 to 2,100 metres).

Many valuable wild animals and medicinal plants are found in the forested mountain areas. The Manchurian hare, valued for its fur, and some species of rodent such as the rat hamster and the eastern field vole are believed to be peculiar to the North-east forest. Among birds, finches, buteo hawks, needle-footed owls, black and white barriers, and certain species of flycatcher are typical. Among semi aquatic animals, the lung-less newts are notable. Certain species of snakes, such as the Schrenk racer, found in the inhabited areas of the North-east and Korea, live in a partially domesticated state and are used to eliminate harmful rodents in orchards and gardens. European wild boars, common hedgehogs, Asian red deer, harvest mice, and field mice are among the more common Eurasian species. Sikas (a type of deer) are prized for their antlers. Valuable pelts include fox, chipmunk, the light-coloured polecat, the Manchurian hare, and the sable. The sable population, however, has diminished considerably; sables are now protected, as are Siberian tigers.

== Weather ==
The climate is cold and temperate. There is significant rainfall throughout the year in Jilin. Even the driest month still has a lot of rainfall. This climate is considered to be Dfa according to the Köppen-Geiger climate classification. The temperature here averages 4.4 °C. The rainfall here averages 679 mm.

July is the warmest month of the year. The temperature in July averages 22.9 °C. In January, the average temperature is -17.8 °C. It is the lowest average temperature of the whole year.

There is a difference of 185 mm of precipitation between the driest and wettest months. The average temperatures vary during the year by 40.7 °C.

Here are graphs of the average monthly temperatures and the average monthly rainfall measurements in Songshan, Jilin. Both of the data sets taken for these graphs were taken in the years of 2000 to 2012.

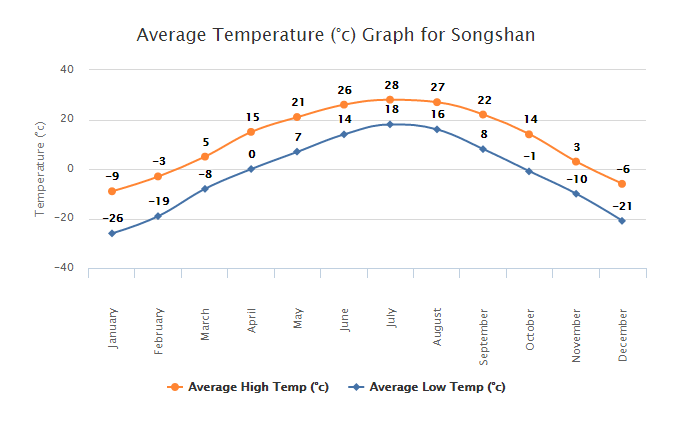
This graphs the average temperature in Songshan.

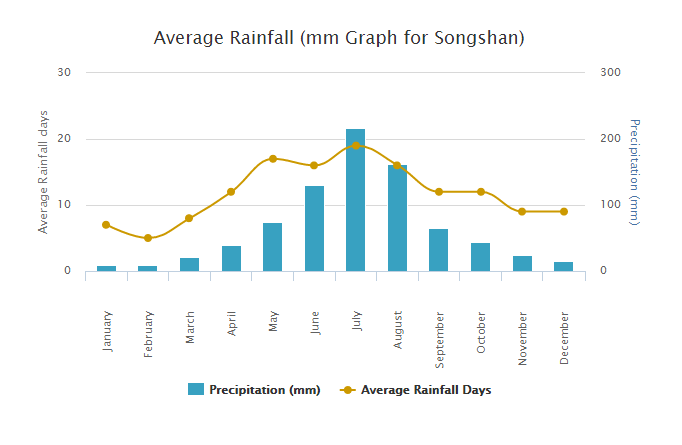
This graphs the average rainfall in Songshan.

== See also ==
- List of township-level divisions of Jilin
