= Macau =

Special administrative region of China

Macau 澳門 Macao; 澳门
- Special administrative region
- Macao Special Administrative Region of the People's Republic of China 中華人民共和國澳門特別行政區; Região Administrativa Especial de Macau da República Popular da China
- Flag Emblem

- Location of Macau within China
- Sovereign state: China
- Portuguese lease: 1557
- Treaty of Peking: 1 December 1887
- Sino-Portuguese Joint Declaration: 26 March 1987
- Handover of Macau: 20 December 1999
- Largest parish by population: Nossa Senhora de Fátima
- Official languages: Chinese (Note: No specific variety of Chinese is official in the territory. Residents predominantly speak Cantonese, the de facto regional standard.); Portuguese (Note: For most government use, documents written using Traditional Chinese characters are authoritative over ones inscribed with Simplified Chinese characters. Portuguese shares equal status with Chinese in all official proceedings.)
- Regional languages: Cantonese; Macanese Portuguese
- Official scripts: Traditional Chinese; Portuguese orthography
- Ethnic groups (2016): 88.4% Chinese; 4.6% Filipino; 2.4% Vietnamese; 1.7% Portuguese; 2.8% other
- Demonym(s): Macau people (Note: The Macanese people are a distinct ethnic group of mixed Asian and European heritage (predominantly Cantonese and Portuguese). Attempts by the Portuguese colonial government in the mid-1990s to change this definition in the Portuguese and English languages ultimately failed.)
- Government: Devolved executive-led government within a unitary state
  - Chief Executive: Sam Hou Fai
  - Administration and Justice Secretary: Wong Sio Chak
  - Assembly President: André Cheong Weng Chon
  - Court President: Song Man Lei
- Legislature: Legislative Assembly

National representation
  - National People's Congress: 12 deputies
  - Chinese People's Political Consultative Conference: 29 delegates

Area
  - Total: 119.3 km^{2} (46.1 sq mi)
  - Water (%): 71.25
  - Land: 32.9 km^{2} (12.7 sq mi)
- Highest elevation (Alto de Coloane): 172.4 m (566 ft)

Population
  - 2024 estimate: 712,651
  - Density: 20,300/km^{2} (52,576.8/sq mi) (1st)
- GDP (PPP): 2024 estimate
  - Total: ▲$92.995 billion (101st)
  - Per capita: ▲$128,030 (4th)
- GDP (nominal): 2024 estimate
  - Total: ▲$54.677 billion (90th)
  - Per capita: ▲$72,910 (8th)
- Gini (2018): 36.0 medium
- HDI (2023): ▲0.934 (Note: The UN does not calculate the HDI of Macau. The government of Macau calculates its own HDI.) very high
- Currency: Macanese pataca (MOP)
- Time zone: UTC+08:00 (Macau Standard Time)
- Date format: dd/mm/yyyy yyyy年mm月dd日
- Mains electricity: 220 V–50 Hz
- Driving side: Left
- Calling code: +853
- ISO 3166 code: MO; CN-MO
- Internet TLD: .mo; .澳門; .澳门
- Licence plate prefixes: 粤Z (Note: Issued by Guangdong Provincial Public Security Department in Guangzhou for the cross-boundary local vehicles entering Mainland China.)

Macau (Note: English: /məˈkaʊ/; Portuguese: [mɐˈkaw]; traditional Chinese: 澳門; simplified Chinese: 澳门, Cantonese: [ōu.mǔːn]; Officially the Macao Special Administrative Region of the People's Republic of China (Chinese: 中華人民共和國澳門特別行政區; Cantonese Yale: Oumún Dahkbiht Hàhngjingkēui, Portuguese: Região Administrativa Especial de Macau da República Popular da China).; Legally Macao, China in international treaties and organisations.) or Macao (Note: Macau is the official spelling in the Portuguese language, and Macao is the official spelling in the English language. Both are used in the Macau passports.) is a special administrative region of China. It consists of the Macau Peninsula, the islands of Taipa and Coloane, the Cotai reclamation zone between Taipa and Coloane, and several smaller islets. It borders Zhuhai to the north and west, and it lies west of Hong Kong, separated by the Pearl River estuary. With a population of about 720,000 people and a land area of 32.9 square kilometres (12.7 sq mi), it is the most densely populated region in the world.

Formerly a Portuguese colony, the territory of Portuguese Macau was first leased to Portugal by the Ming dynasty as a trading post in 1557. Portugal paid an annual rent and administered the territory under Chinese sovereignty until 1887, when Portugal gained perpetual colonial rights with the signing of the Sino-Portuguese Treaty of Peking. The colony remained under Portuguese rule until the 1999 handover to China. Macau is a special administrative region of China, which maintains separate governing and economic systems from those of mainland China under the principle of "one country, two systems". The unique blend of Portuguese, French, English, Italian, and Chinese architecture in the city's downtown area has resulted in its designation as a UNESCO World Heritage Site in 2005.

Macau is famous and globally recognised for its casinos, known by the gambling industry as the gambling capital of the world. It is also one of the most visited cities in the world. The gambling industry of Macau is around seven times larger than that of Las Vegas, Nevada. As a result, the city has one of the highest GDPs per capita and GDPs per capita by purchasing power parity in the world.

Macau has a very high Human Development Index of 0.934, as calculated by the Government of Macau, and has the third-highest life expectancy in the world. The territory is highly urbanised, holding the status of the most densely populated territory on Earth; two-thirds of the region's total area is built on land reclaimed from the sea.

== Etymology ==
Macau
- Macau in Traditional (top) and Simplified (bottom) Chinese characters

Chinese name
- Traditional Chinese: 澳門
- Simplified Chinese: 澳门
- Literal meaning: Bay Gate
Transcriptions
Standard Mandarin
- Hanyu Pinyin: Àomén
- Bopomofo: ㄠˋ ㄇㄣˊ
- Wade–Giles: Ao^{4}-men^{2}
- Tongyong Pinyin: Ào-mén
- IPA: [âʊ.mə̌n]
other Mandarin
- Xiao'erjing: اَوْمٍ
Wu
- Wugniu: au^{5} men^{2}
- IPA: Shanghainese: [ɔ˧ mən˦]
Hakka
- Romanization: Au^{4} mun^{2}
Yue: Cantonese
- Yale Romanization: Oumún
- Jyutping: ou3 mun2
- Canton Romanization: Ou^{3}mun^{4*2}
- IPA: [ɔw˧.mun˧˥]
Southern Min
- Hokkien POJ: Ò-mn̂g
Eastern Min
- Fuzhou BUC: Ó̤-muòng

Macau Special Administrative Region
- Traditional Chinese: 澳門特別行政區 (or 澳門特區)
- Simplified Chinese: 澳门特别行政区 (or 澳门特区)
Transcriptions
Standard Mandarin
- Hanyu Pinyin: Àomén Tèbié Xíngzhèngqū (Àomén Tèqū)
- Bopomofo: ㄠˋ ㄇㄣˊ ㄊㄜˋ ㄅㄧㄝˊ ㄒㄧㄥˊ ㄓㄥˋ ㄑㄩ (ㄠˋ ㄇㄣˊ ㄊㄜˋ ㄑㄩ)
- Wade–Giles: Ao^{4}-men^{2} Tʻe^{4}-pieh^{2} Hsing^{2}-cheng^{4}-chʻü^{1} (Ao^{4}-men^{2} Tʻe^{4} Chʻü^{1})
- Tongyong Pinyin: Ào-mén Tè-bié Síng-jhèng-cyu (Ào-mén Tè-cyu)
- IPA: [âʊ.mə̌n tʰɤ̂.pjě ɕǐŋ.ʈʂə̂ŋ.tɕʰý] ([âʊ.mə̌n tʰɤ̂.tɕʰý])
Wu
- Wugniu: au^{5} men^{2} deq^{8} biq^{8} yin^{2} tsen^{5} chiu^{1}; au^{5} men^{2} deq^{8} chiu^{1}
- IPA: Shanghainese: [ɔ˧ mən˦ dəʔ˩ biɪʔ˨ ɦin˩ tsən˦ tɕy˩]; Shanghainese: [ɔ˧ mən˦ dəʔ˩ tɕy˦]
Hakka
- Romanization: Au^{4}mun^{2} Tet^{6}piet^{6} hang^{2}zin^{4}ki^{1} (Au^{4}mun^{2} Tet^{6}ki^{1})
Yue: Cantonese
- Yale Romanization: Oumún Dahkbiht Hàhngjing Keūi
- Jyutping: ou3 mun2 dak6 bit6 hang4 zing3 keoi1
- Canton Romanization: Ou^{3}mun>^{4*2} Deg^{6}bid^{6} Heng^{4}jing^{3} Kêu^{1}
- IPA: [ɔw˧.mun˧˥ tɐk̚˨.pit̚ hɐŋ˩.tsɪŋ˧ kʰɵɥ˥]
Southern Min
- Hokkien POJ: Ò-mn̂g Te̍k-pia̍t Hêng-chèng-khu

Portuguese name
- Portuguese: Região Administrativa Especial de Macau [ʁɨʒiˈɐ̃w ɐðminiʃtɾɐˈtivɐ ɨʃpɨsiˈal dɨ mɐˈkaw]

The first known written record of the name Macau, rendered as A Ma Gang (亞/阿-媽/馬-港), is found in a letter dated 20 November 1555. The local inhabitants believed that the sea goddess Matsu (alternatively called A-Ma) had blessed and protected the harbour and referred to the waters around A-Ma Temple by her name. When Portuguese explorers first arrived in the area and asked for the place name, the locals thought they were asking about the temple and told them it was Ma Kok (媽閣). The earliest Portuguese spelling for this was Amaquão. Multiple variations were used until Amacão / Amacao and Macão / Macao became common during the 17th century.

The 1911 reform of Portuguese orthography standardised the spelling as Macau; however, the use of Macao persisted in English and other European languages.

The Macau Peninsula had many names in Chinese, including 井澳 (zeng2 ou3) 鏡澳 (geng3 ou3), 濠鏡 (hou4 geng3), and 濠鏡澳 (hou4 geng3 ou3). The islands Taipa, Coloane, and Hengqin were collectively called 十字門 (sap6 zi6 mun4). These names would later become 澳門 (ou3 mun4) 'bay gate' or 'port gate', Mandarin: Àomén), referring to the whole territory.

== History ==
During the Qin dynasty (221–206 BC), the region was under the jurisdiction of Panyu County, Nanhai Commandery. The region is first known to have been settled during the Han dynasty. It was administratively part of Dongguan Prefecture in the Jin dynasty (266–420 AD), and alternated under the control of Nanhai and Dongguan in later dynasties. In 1152, during the Song dynasty (960–1279 AD), it was under the jurisdiction of the new Xiangshan County. In 1277, approximately 50,000 refugees fleeing the Mongol conquest of China settled in the coastal area.

The first European visitor to reach China by sea was the explorer Jorge Álvares, who arrived in 1513. Merchants first established a trading post in Hong Kong waters at Tamão, present-day Tuen Mun, beginning regular trade with nearby settlements in southern China. Military clashes between the Ming and Portuguese navies followed the expulsion of the Tamão traders in 1521. Despite the trade ban, Portuguese merchants continued to attempt to settle on other parts of the Pearl River estuary, finally settling on Macau.

In their first attempts at obtaining trading posts by force, the Portuguese were defeated by the Ming Chinese at the Battle of Tamão in 1521, where the Portuguese lost two ships. They were also defeated at the Battle of Xicaowan around Lantau Island, where the Portuguese lost two more ships. Other defeats include Shuangyu in 1548, where several Portuguese were captured, and near Dongshan County in 1549, where two Portuguese junks and Galeote Pereira were captured.

The Portuguese later returned to China peacefully and presented themselves under the name Portuguese instead of Franks in the Luso-Chinese agreement (1554). They rented Macau as a trading post from China by paying an annual lease of hundreds of silver taels to Ming China. Luso-Canton trade relations were formally reestablished in 1554, and Portugal soon after acquired a permanent lease for Macau in 1557, agreeing to pay 500 taels of silver as annual land rent.

Macau became a stopover on the sea lane that connected Japan with the wider world. The Portuguese could avoid the Pearl River and inched towards Quanzhou and Ningbo. But as they failed to establish trading relationships with the Chinese, the Portuguese focused on trade with Japan. The Roman Catholic Diocese of Macau was created in 1576. By 1583, the Municipal Council of Macau had been established to handle municipal affairs for the growing settlement. Macau was at the peak of its prosperity as a major warehouse during the late 16th century, providing a crucial connection in exporting Chinese silk to Japan during the Nanban trade period.

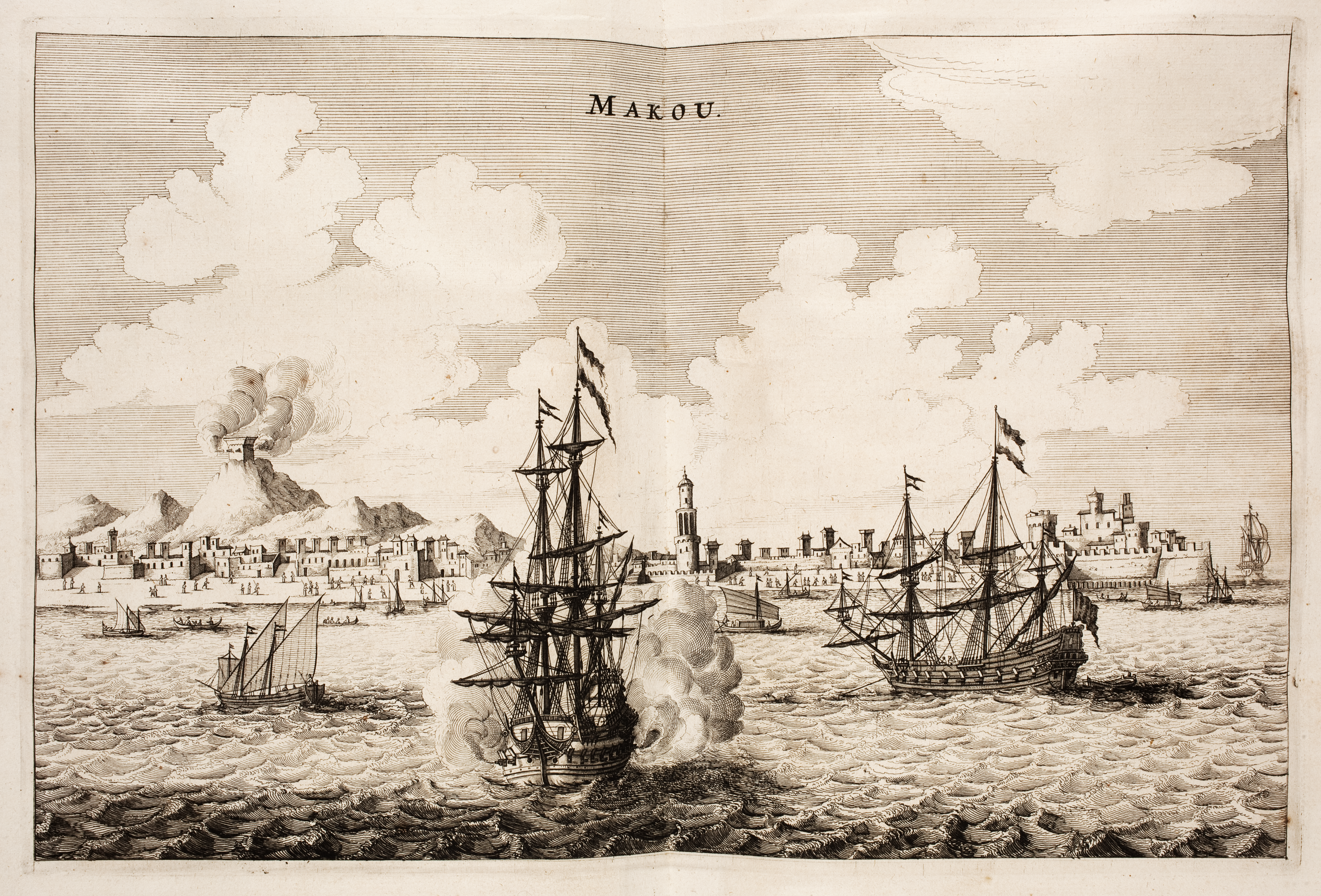
Dutch ships firing their cannons in the waters of Macau, drawn in 1665

Although the Portuguese were initially prohibited from fortifying Macau or stockpiling weapons, the Fortaleza do Monte was constructed in response to frequent Dutch naval incursions. The Dutch attempted to take the city in the 1622 Battle of Macau, but were repelled successfully by the Portuguese. Macau entered a period of decline in the 1640s following a series of catastrophic events for the burgeoning colony: Portuguese access to trade routes was irreparably severed when Japan halted trade in 1639, and after the Portuguese Restoration War of 1640, Portuguese Malacca fell to the Dutch in 1641.

Maritime trade with China was banned in 1644 following the Qing conquest under the Haijin policies. It was limited only to Macau on a lesser scale while the new dynasty focused on eliminating surviving Ming loyalists. While the Kangxi Emperor lifted the prohibition in 1684, China again restricted trade decades later under the Canton System in 1757. Foreign ships were required to stop first at Macau before further proceeding to Canton. Qing authorities exercised a much greater role in governing the territory during this period; Chinese residents were subject to Qing courts, and new construction had to be approved by the resident mandarin beginning in the 1740s. As the opium trade became more lucrative during the 18th century, Macau again became an important stopping point en route to China.

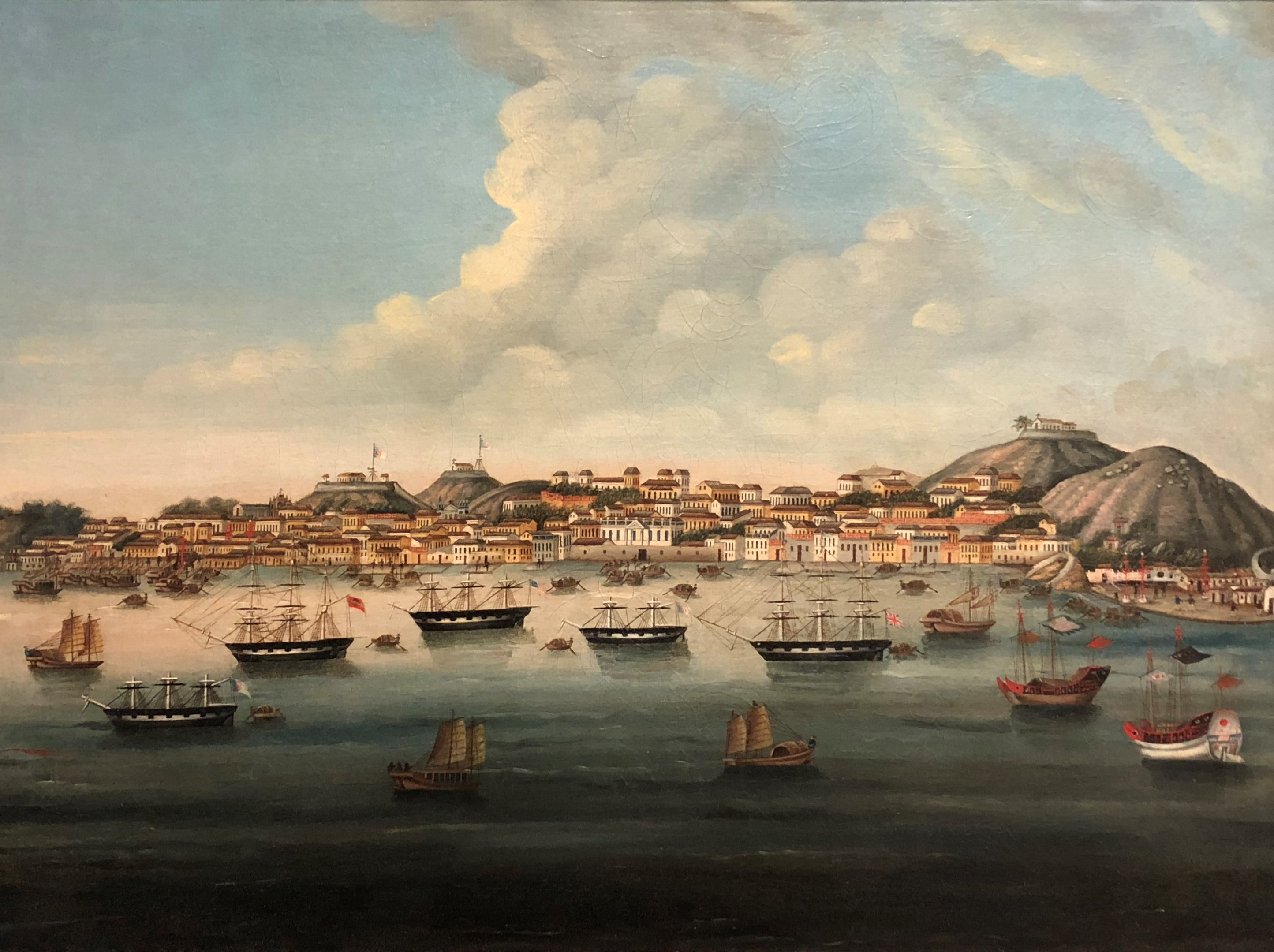
Macau in the early 19th century

Following the First Opium War and the establishment of Hong Kong by the British, Macau lost its role as a major port. Firecracker and incense production, as well as tea and tobacco processing, were vital industries in the colony during this time. Portugal was able to capitalise on China's postwar weakness and assert its sovereignty; the Governor of Macau began refusing to pay China annual land rent for the colony in the 1840s, and annexed Taipa and Coloane, in 1851 and 1864, respectively. Portugal also occupied nearby Lapa and Montanha. But these were returned to China by 1887, when perpetual occupation rights over Macau were formalised in the Sino-Portuguese Treaty of Peking. This agreement also prohibited Portugal from ceding Macau without Chinese approval. Despite occasional conflict between Cantonese authorities and the colonial government, Macau's status remained unchanged through the republican revolutions of both Portugal in 1910 and China in 1911. The Kuomintang further affirmed Portuguese jurisdiction in Macau when the Treaty of Peking was renegotiated in 1928.

During the Second World War, the Empire of Japan did not occupy the colony and generally respected Portuguese neutrality in Macau. However, after Japanese troops captured a British cargo ship in Macau waters in 1943, Japan installed a group of government "advisors" as an alternative to military occupation. The territory largely avoided military action during the war except in 1945, when the United States ordered air raids on Macau after learning that the colonial government was preparing to sell aviation fuel to Japan. In 1950, the United States paid Portugal more than US$20 million in compensation for the damage during the war.

Refugees from mainland China swelled the population as they fled from the Chinese Civil War. Access to a large workforce enabled Macau's economy to grow as the colony expanded its clothing and textiles manufacturing industry, developed its tourism industry, and legalised casino gaming. However, at the height of the Cultural Revolution, residents dissatisfied with the colonial administration rioted in the 1966 12-3 incident, in which 8 people were killed, and more than 200 were injured. Portugal lost full control over the colony afterward, and agreed to cooperate with the Chinese Communist Party in exchange for continued administration of Macau.

Following the 1974 Carnation Revolution, Portugal formally relinquished Macau as an overseas province and acknowledged it as a "Chinese territory under Portuguese administration". After China first concluded arrangements on Hong Kong's future with the United Kingdom, it entered negotiations with Portugal over Macau in 1986.

These concluded with the signing of the 1987 Joint Declaration on the Question of Macau, in which Portugal agreed to the handover of the colony in 1999 and China guaranteed Macau's political and economic systems for 50 years after the handover. In the waning years of colonial rule, Macau rapidly urbanised and constructed large-scale infrastructure projects, including the Macau International Airport and a new container port. The handover of Macau was at midnight on 20 December 1999, after 442 years of Portuguese rule.

Following the handover, Macau liberalised its casino industry (which previously operated under a government-licensed monopoly) and allowed foreign investors, starting a new period of economic development. The regional economy grew by a double-digit annual growth rate from 2002 to 2014, making Macau one of the richest economies in the world on a per capita basis. Political debates have centred on the region's jurisdictional independence and the central government's adherence to "one country, two systems". While issues such as national security legislation have been controversial, Macau residents generally have high levels of trust in the government. Kwong and Wong explain this by comparing Macau to Hong Kong: "The case of Macau shows that the very small size of a 'microstate' helps central authorities to exercise political control, stifle political pluralism, and monopolize opinions, all of which strengthen regime persistence."

== Government and politics ==
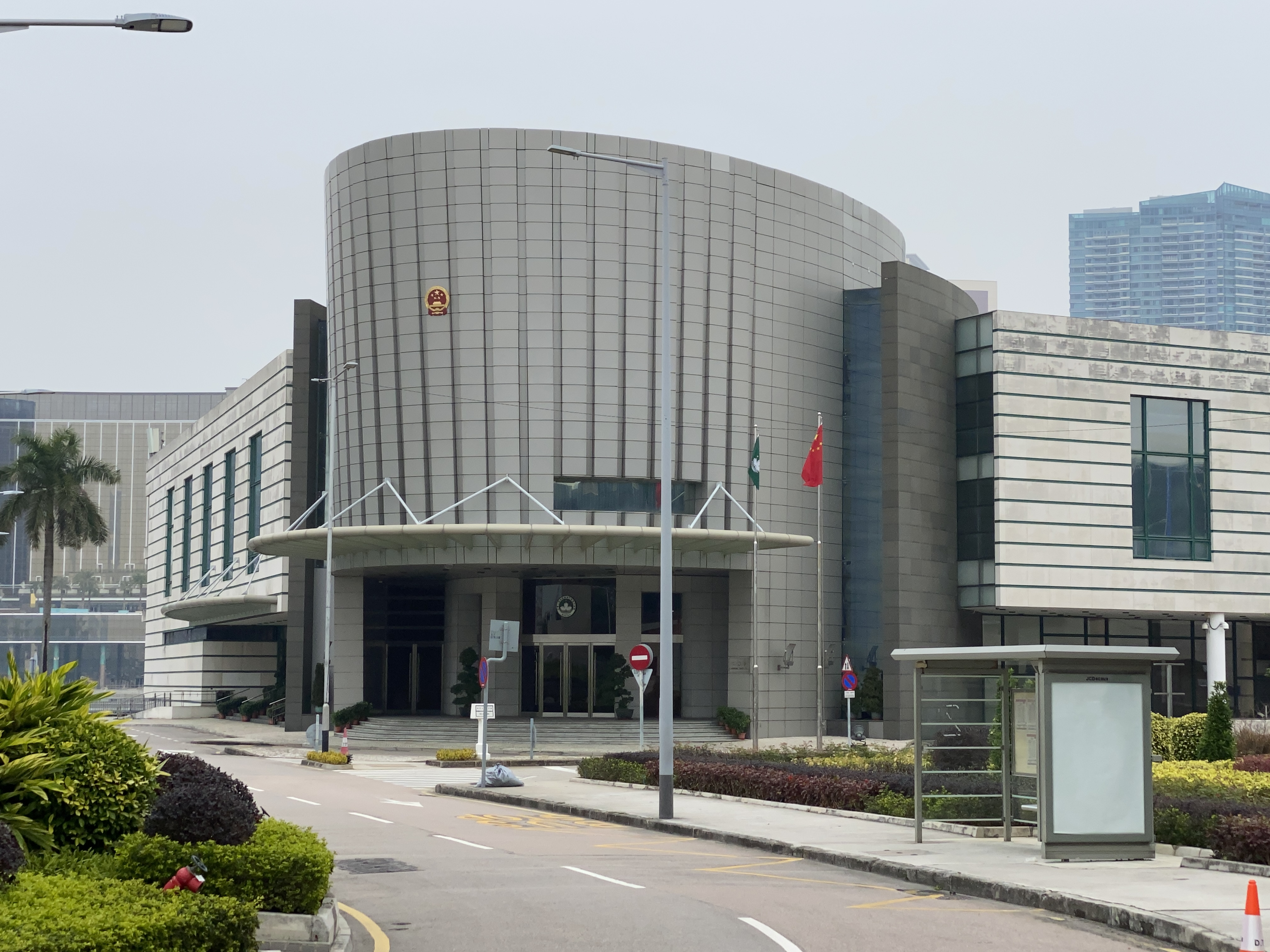
The legislature meets in the Legislative Assembly Building in Sé.

Macau is a special administrative region of China, with executive, legislative, and judicial powers devolved from the national government. The Sino-Portuguese Joint Declaration provided for economic and administrative continuity through the handover, resulting in an executive-led governing system largely inherited from the territory's history as a Portuguese colony. Under these terms and the "one country, two systems" principle, the Basic Law of Macao is the regional constitution. Because negotiations for the Joint Declaration and Basic Law began after transitional arrangements for Hong Kong were made, Macau's structure of government is very similar to Hong Kong's.

The regional government is composed of three branches:

- Executive: The Chief Executive is responsible for enforcing regional law, can force reconsideration of legislation, and appoints Executive Council members, a portion of the legislature, and principal officials. Acting with the Executive Council, the Chief Executive can propose new bills, issue subordinate legislation, and has authority to dissolve the legislature.
- Legislature: The unicameral Legislative Assembly enacts regional law, approves budgets, and has the power to impeach a sitting Chief Executive.
- Judiciary: The Court of Final Appeal and lower courts, whose judges are appointed by the Chief Executive on the advice of a recommendation commission, interpret laws and overturn those inconsistent with the Basic Law.

The Chief Executive is the head of government, and serves for a maximum of two five-year terms. The State Council (led by the Premier of China) appoints the Chief Executive after nomination by the Election Committee, which is composed of 400 business, community, and government leaders.

The Legislative Assembly has 33 members, each serving a four-year term: 14 are directly elected, 12 indirectly elected, and 7 appointed by the Chief Executive. Indirectly elected assemblymembers are selected from limited electorates representing sectors of the economy or special interest groups. All directly elected members are chosen with proportional representation.

Twelve political parties had representatives elected to the Legislative Assembly in the 2017 election. These parties have aligned themselves into two ideological groups: the pro-establishment (the current government) and pro-democracy camps. Macau is represented in the National People's Congress by 12 deputies chosen through an electoral college, and 29 delegates in the Chinese People's Political Consultative Conference appointed by the central government.

Macau has generally congenial relations with China's central government.

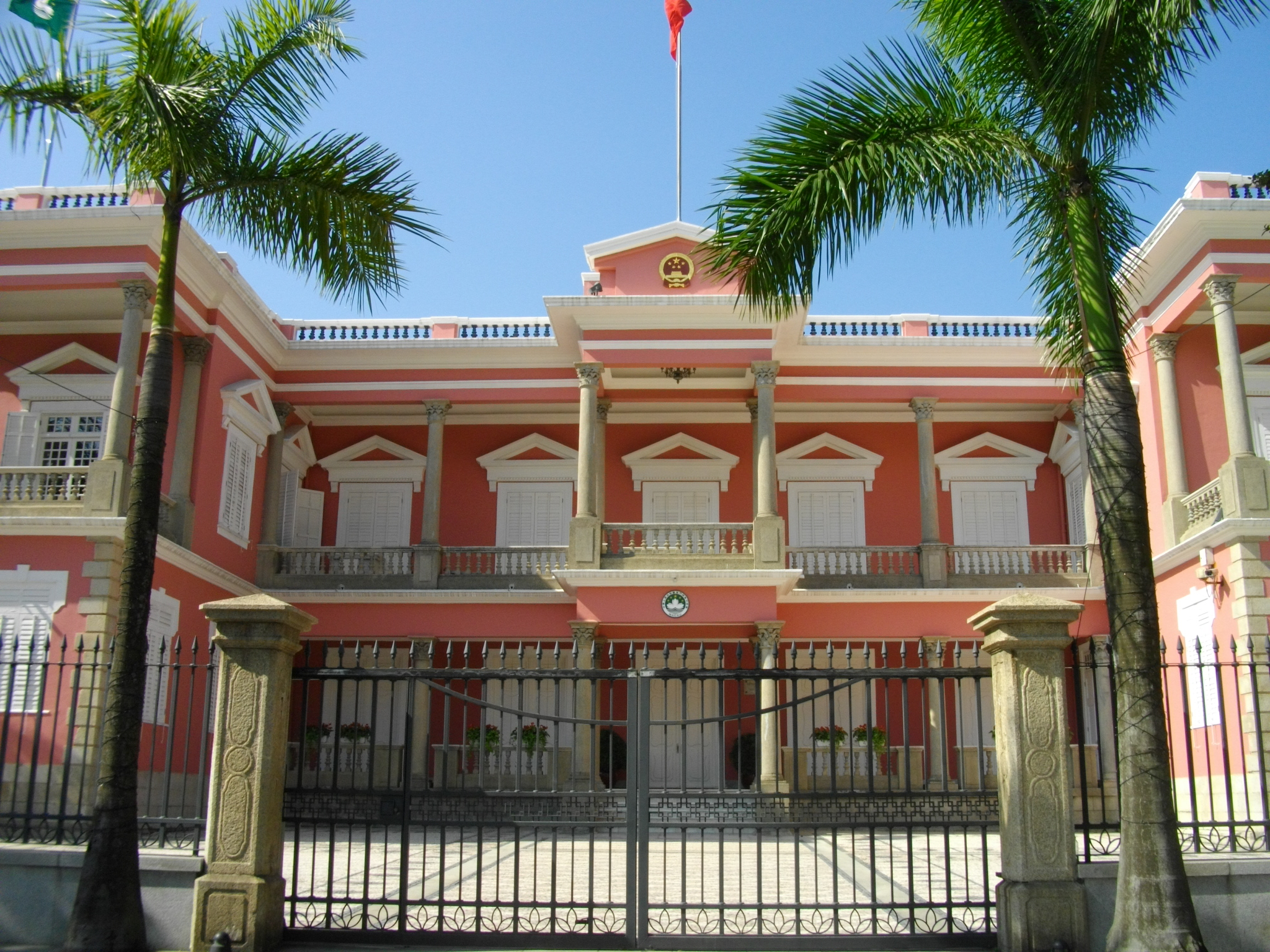
The Macau Government Headquarters is the official office of the Chief Executive.

Chinese national law does not generally apply in the region, and Macau is treated as a separate jurisdiction. Its judicial system is based on Portuguese civil law, continuing the legal tradition established during colonial rule. Interpretative and amending power over the Basic Law and jurisdiction over acts of state lie with the central authority; however, this makes regional courts ultimately subordinate to the mainland's socialist civil law system. Decisions made by the Standing Committee of the National People's Congress can also override territorial judicial processes. In 2021, after similar actions were taken in Hong Kong following the protests associated with the Anti-Extradition Law Amendment Bill Movement, 21 candidates running for office in the territorial elections were disqualified as a result of allegedly failing to support the Basic Law, although the territory's electoral commission noted no specific violations.

The territory's jurisdictional independence is most apparent in its immigration and taxation policies. The Identification Department issues passports for permanent residents, which differ from those issued by the mainland or Hong Kong, and the region maintains a regulated border with the rest of the country. All travellers between Macau and China and Hong Kong must pass border controls, regardless of nationality. Chinese citizens resident in mainland China do not have the right of abode in Macau and are subject to immigration controls. Public finances are handled separately from the national government, and taxes levied in Macau do not fund the central authority.

The Macao Garrison is responsible for the region's defence. Although the Chairman of the Central Military Commission is supreme commander of the armed forces, the regional government may request assistance from the garrison. Macau residents are not required to perform military service, and the law also has no provision for local enlistment, so its defence force is composed entirely of nonresidents.

The State Council and the Ministry of Foreign Affairs handle diplomatic matters. Still, Macau retains the ability to maintain separate economic and cultural relations with foreign nations. The territory negotiates its own trade agreements and actively participates in supranational organisations, including agencies of the World Trade Organization and United Nations. The regional government maintains trade offices in Greater China and other nations.

Public political demonstrations in Macau are generally rare.

=== Lusophonia membership ===
Macau is not a member of the Community of Portuguese Language Countries, despite Portuguese being one of its official languages. This is due to it not being a sovereign nation, but a subnational division of China. In 2006, during the II Ministerial meeting between China and Portuguese-speaking countries, the CPLP Executive Secretary and Deputy Ambassador Tadeu Soares invited the Chief Executive of the Government of the Macau Special Administrative Region, Edmund Ho, to request the Associate Observer status for Macau. The Government of Macau has yet to make this request. In 2016, Murade Murargy, then executive secretary of CPLP, said in an interview that Macau's membership is a complicated question, since, like the Galicia region in Spain, it is not an independent country, but only a part of China. However, the Instituto Internacional de Macau (澳門國際研究所) and the University of São José are Consultative Observers of the CPLP.

=== Administrative divisions ===
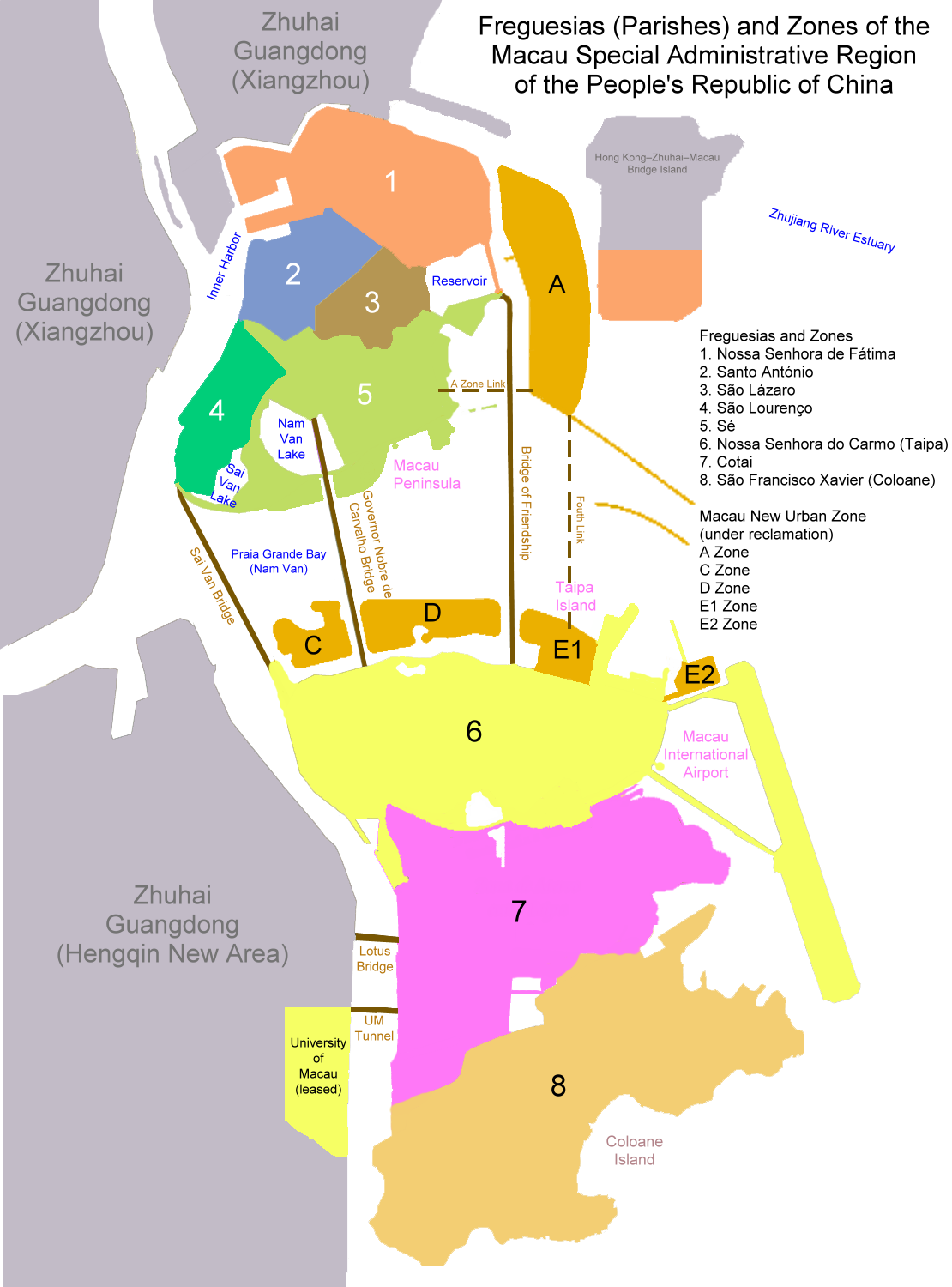
Administrative divisions of Macau

The territory is divided into seven parishes. Cotai, a major area developed on reclaimed land between Taipa and Coloane, and areas of the Macau New Urban Zone do not have defined parishes. Historically, the parishes belonged to one of two municipalities (the Municipality of Macau or the Municipality of Ilhas) that were responsible for administering municipal services. The municipalities were abolished in 2001 and superseded by the Civic and Municipal Affairs Bureau in providing local services.

Parish/Area	Chinese	Area (km^{2})
Parishes
Nossa Senhora de Fátima	花地瑪堂區	3.2
Santo António	花王堂區	1.1
São Lázaro	望德堂區	0.6
São Lourenço	風順堂區	1.0
Sé (including New District Zone B)	大堂區 (包括新城B區)	3.4
Nossa Senhora do Carmo (including New District Zone E)	嘉模堂區 (包括新城E區)	7.9
São Francisco Xavier	聖方濟各堂區	7.6
Other areas
Cotai	路氹填海區	6.0
New District Zone A	新城A區	1.4
HZMB Zhuhai-Macau Port	港珠澳大橋珠澳口岸	0.7
University of Macau (Hengqin campus)	澳門大學 (橫琴校區)	1.0

== Geography ==
Map of the Pearl River Delta

Macau (Guangdong)

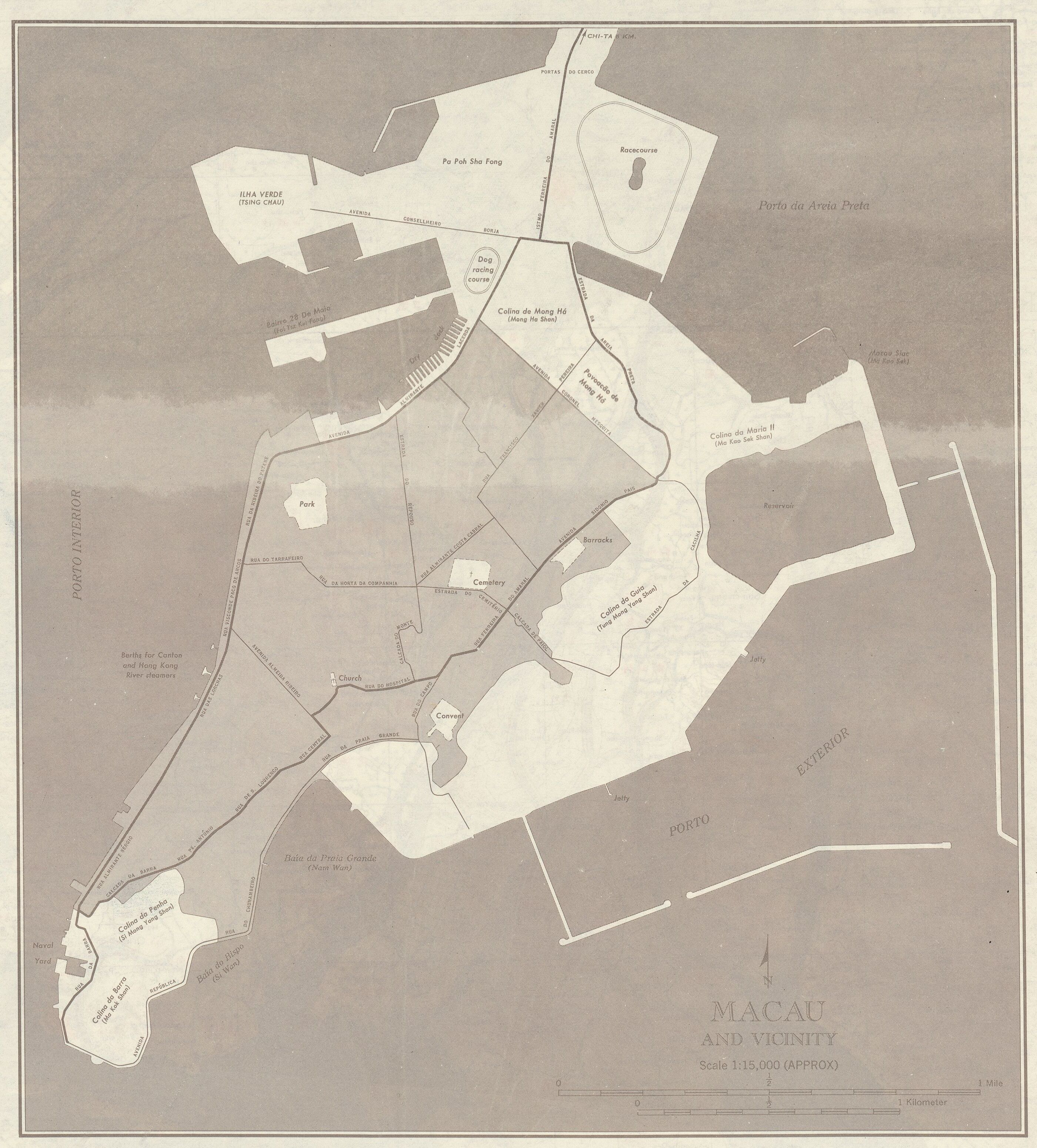
Map of Macau in 1950

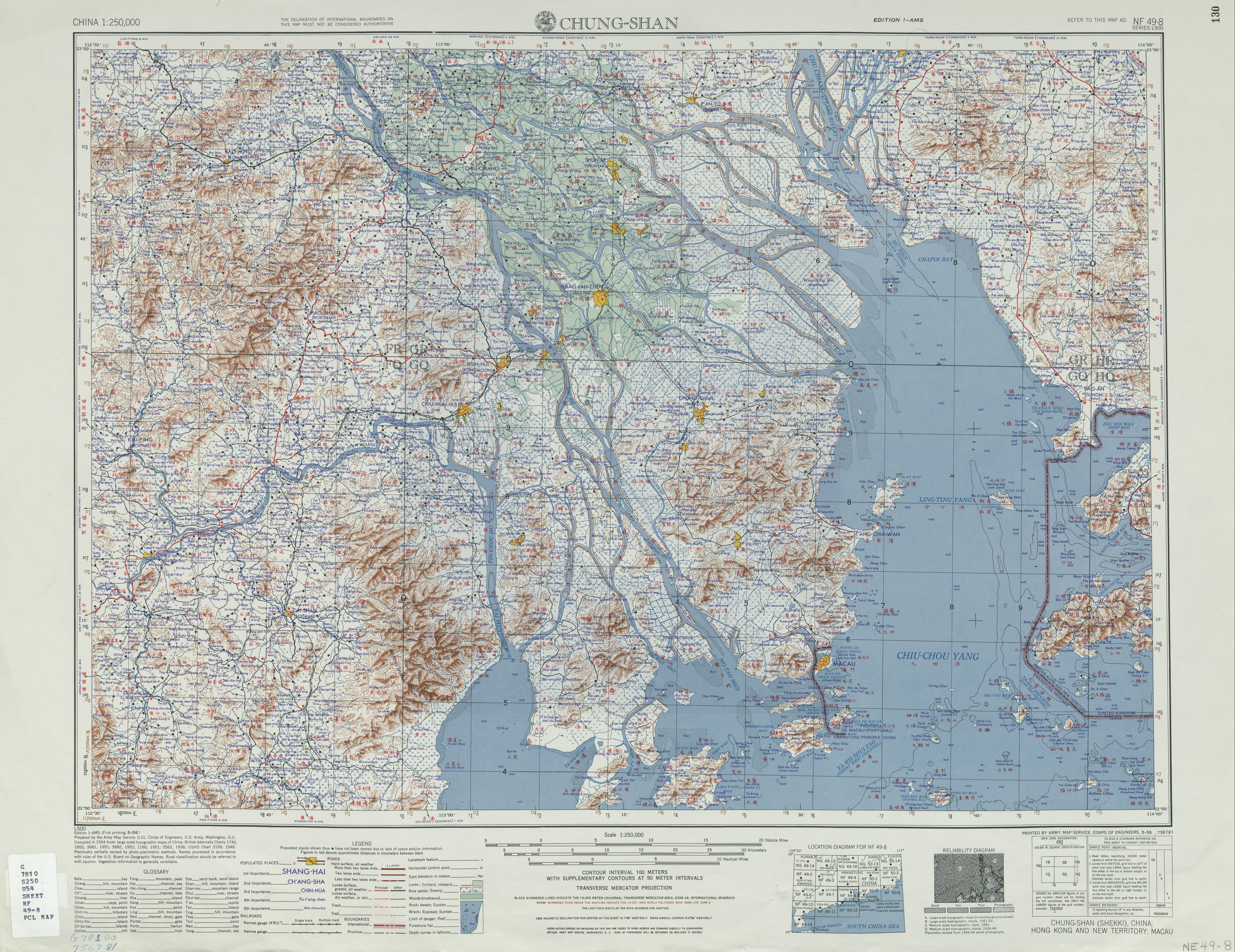
A 1954 map of the Zhongshan region. Macau is located at the bottom-right of the region.

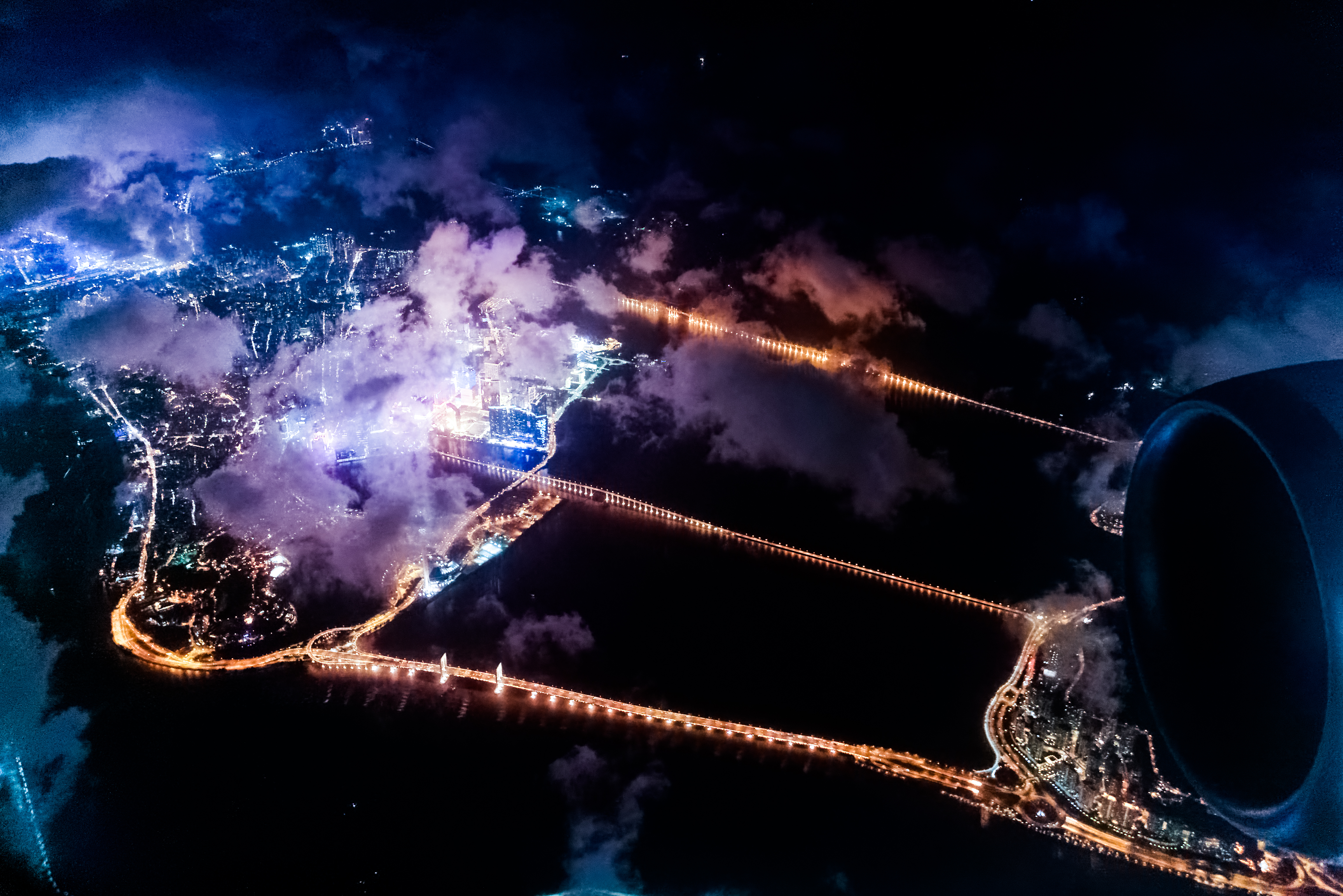
Aerial view of the Macau Peninsula at night in 2016

Macau is located on China's southern coast, 60 kilometres (37 mi) west of Hong Kong, on the south shore of Zhongshan Island on the western side of the Pearl River estuary. It is surrounded by the South China Sea in the east and south, and neighbours the Guangdong city of Zhuhai to the west and north. The territory consists of Macau Peninsula, Taipa, and Coloane. A 1-square-kilometre (0.39 sq mi) parcel of land in neighbouring Hengqin island that hosts the University of Macau also falls under the regional government's jurisdiction. The territory's highest point is Coloane Alto, 170.6 metres (560 ft) above sea level.

Urban development is concentrated on peninsular Macau, where most of the population lives. The peninsula was originally a separate island with hilly terrain, which gradually became a tombolo as a connecting sandbar formed over time. Both natural sedimentation and land reclamation expanded the area enough to support urban growth. Macau has tripled its land area in the last century, increasing from 10.28 square kilometres (3.97 sq mi) in the late 19th century to 32.9 square kilometres (12.7 sq mi) in 2018.

Cotai, the area of reclaimed land connecting Taipa and Coloane, contains many of the newer casinos and resorts established after 1999. The region's jurisdiction over the surrounding sea was greatly expanded in 2015, when it was granted an additional 85 square kilometres (33 sq mi) of maritime territory by the State Council. The border on land was also shifted to place border control with Macau, with the land border mostly shifting to the middle of the Canal dos Patos. Further reclamation is underway to develop parts of the Macau New Urban Zone. The territory also has control over part of an artificial island to maintain a border checkpoint for the Hong Kong–Zhuhai–Macau Bridge.

=== Climate ===
Despite being located south of the Tropic of Cancer, Macau has a humid subtropical climate (Köppen Cwa), characteristic of southern China. The territory is dual season dominant – summer (May to September) and winter (December to February) are the longest seasons, while spring (March and April) and autumn (October and November) are relatively brief periods. The summer monsoon brings warm and humid air from the sea, with the most frequent rainfall occurring during the season. Typhoons also occur more often than usual, bringing significant spikes in rainfall. During the winter, northern winds from the continent bring dry air and much less rainfall. The highest and lowest temperatures recorded at the Macao Meteorological and Geophysical Bureau are 38.9 °C (102.0 °F) on both 2 July 1930 and 6 July 1930 and −1.8 °C (28.8 °F) on 26 January 1948.

Climate data for Macau (1991–2020 normals, extremes 1901–present)
Month	Jan	Feb	Mar	Apr	May	Jun	Jul	Aug	Sep	Oct	Nov	Dec	Year
Record high °C (°F)	29.1 (84.4)	30.2 (86.4)	31.5 (88.7)	35.3 (95.5)	37.5 (99.5)	36.9 (98.4)	38.9 (102.0)	38.5 (101.3)	38.1 (100.6)	36.0 (96.8)	34.2 (93.6)	30.0 (86.0)	38.9 (102.0)
Mean daily maximum °C (°F)	18.6 (65.5)	19.2 (66.6)	21.4 (70.5)	25.1 (77.2)	28.7 (83.7)	30.5 (86.9)	31.4 (88.5)	31.5 (88.7)	30.8 (87.4)	28.5 (83.3)	24.7 (76.5)	20.3 (68.5)	25.9 (78.6)
Daily mean °C (°F)	15.2 (59.4)	16.1 (61.0)	18.6 (65.5)	22.3 (72.1)	25.8 (78.4)	27.8 (82.0)	28.4 (83.1)	28.3 (82.9)	27.5 (81.5)	25.1 (77.2)	21.3 (70.3)	16.9 (62.4)	22.8 (73.0)
Mean daily minimum °C (°F)	12.7 (54.9)	13.9 (57.0)	16.5 (61.7)	20.3 (68.5)	23.7 (74.7)	25.7 (78.3)	26.1 (79.0)	25.9 (78.6)	25.1 (77.2)	22.7 (72.9)	18.8 (65.8)	14.3 (57.7)	20.5 (68.9)
Record low °C (°F)	−1.8 (28.8)	0.4 (32.7)	3.2 (37.8)	8.5 (47.3)	13.8 (56.8)	18.5 (65.3)	19.3 (66.7)	19.0 (66.2)	13.2 (55.8)	9.5 (49.1)	5.0 (41.0)	0.0 (32.0)	−1.8 (28.8)
Average precipitation mm (inches)	34.2 (1.35)	43.9 (1.73)	80.0 (3.15)	153.5 (6.04)	286.0 (11.26)	373.7 (14.71)	290.7 (11.44)	331.4 (13.05)	227.8 (8.97)	75.1 (2.96)	39.0 (1.54)	31.3 (1.23)	1,966.6 (77.43)
Average precipitation days	5.8	8.9	11.4	11.6	14.1	17.7	16.6	16.2	12.3	6.2	4.9	5.0	130.9
Average relative humidity (%)	74.9	80.5	85.0	86.3	84.9	84.6	82.7	82.1	78.3	72.5	72.6	70.8	79.6
Mean monthly sunshine hours	126.5	85.7	74.8	94.6	135.5	159.0	211.3	188.2	178.3	192.2	158.1	145.1	1,749.3
Source: Macao Meteorological and Geophysical Bureau

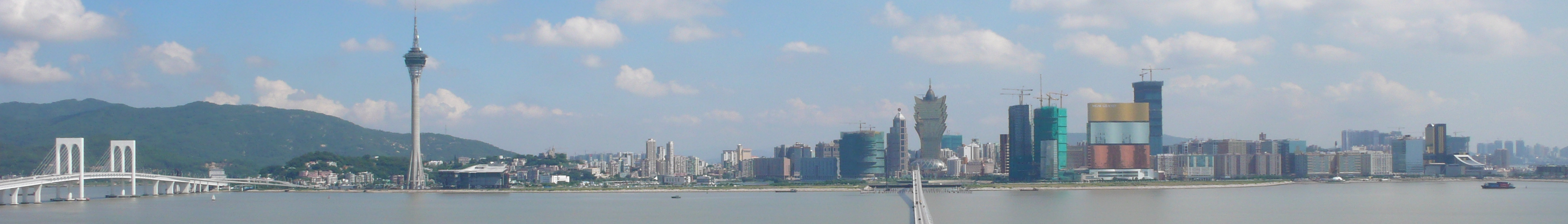
The Macau Peninsula skyline, viewed from Taipa
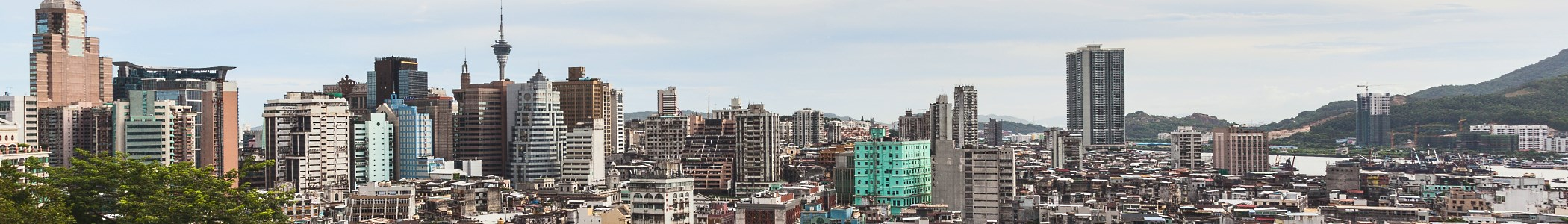
View of the Macau Old City

== Demographics ==
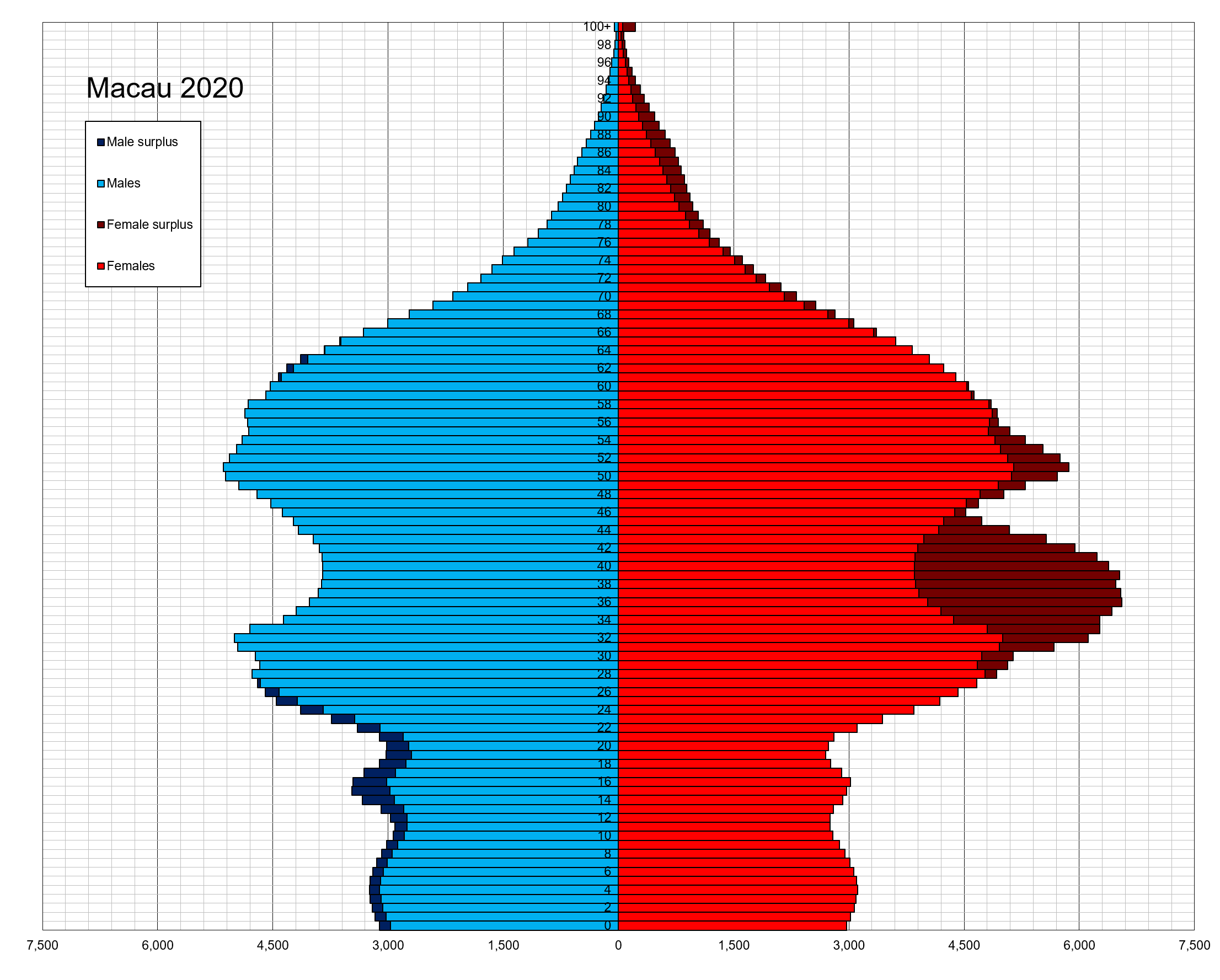
2020 population pyramid

The Statistics and Census Service estimated Macau's population at 667,400 at the end of 2018. With a population density of 21,340 people per square kilometre, Macau is the most densely populated region in the world. The overwhelming majority (88.7 per cent) are Chinese, many of whom originate from Guangdong (31.9 per cent) or Fujian (5.9 per cent). The remaining 11.6 percent are non ethnic Chinese minorities, primarily Filipinos (4.6 percent), Vietnamese (2.4 percent), and Portuguese (1.8 percent). Several thousand residents are of Macanese heritage, native-born multiracial people with mixed Portuguese ancestry. Of the total population (excluding migrants), 49.4 percent were born in Macau, followed by 43.1 percent in mainland China. A large portion of the population are Portuguese citizens, a legacy of colonial rule; at the time of the handover in 1999, 107,000 residents held Portuguese passports.

Life expectancy in Macau was 81.7 years for males and 87.8 years for females in 2018, the fourth highest in the world. Cancer, heart disease, and respiratory disease are the territory's three leading causes of death. Most government-provided healthcare services are free of charge, though alternative treatment is also heavily subsidised.

Migrant workers living in Macau account for over 25 percent of the entire workforce. They largely work in lower wage sectors of the economy, including construction, hotels, and restaurants. As a growing proportion of residents take up employment in the gaming industry, the disparity in income between local and migrant workers has been increasing. Rising living costs have also pushed a large portion of nonresident workers to live in Zhuhai.

=== Religion ===
Religion in Macau (2012)
1. Buddhism (incl. Chinese folk religion) (80.0%)
2. Christianity (6.70%)
3. Other (13.7%)

According to the Government Information Bureau, 80 per cent of the population practices Buddhism, 6.7 per cent follow Christianity and 13.7 per cent follow other religion, such as Taoism and Confucianism. Folk practices are also common among the citizens. According to Pew Research Center, Chinese folk religions have the most adherents (58.9 percent) and is followed by Buddhism (17.3 percent) and Christianity (7.2 percent). In comparison, the usual 15.4 percent of the population professes no religious affiliation at all. Small minorities adhering to other religions (less than 1 percent), including Hinduism, Judaism, and Islam, are also resident in Macau.

=== Language ===
The predominant language is Cantonese, a variety of Chinese originating in Guangdong. It is spoken by 87.5 percent of the population, 80.1 percent as a first language and 7.5 percent as a second language. Only 2.3 percent can speak Portuguese, the other official language; 0.7 percent are native speakers, and 1.6 percent use it as a second language. Increased immigration from mainland China in recent years has added to the number of Mandarin speakers, making up about half of the population (50.4 percent); 5.5 percent are native speakers and 44.9 percent are second language speakers. Traditional Chinese characters are used in writing, rather than the simplified characters used on the mainland. English is considered an additional working language and is spoken by over a quarter of the population (27.5 percent); 2.8 percent are native speakers, and 24.7 percent speak English as a second language. Macanese Patois, a local creole generally known as Patuá, is now spoken only by a few in the older Macanese community.

== Economy ==
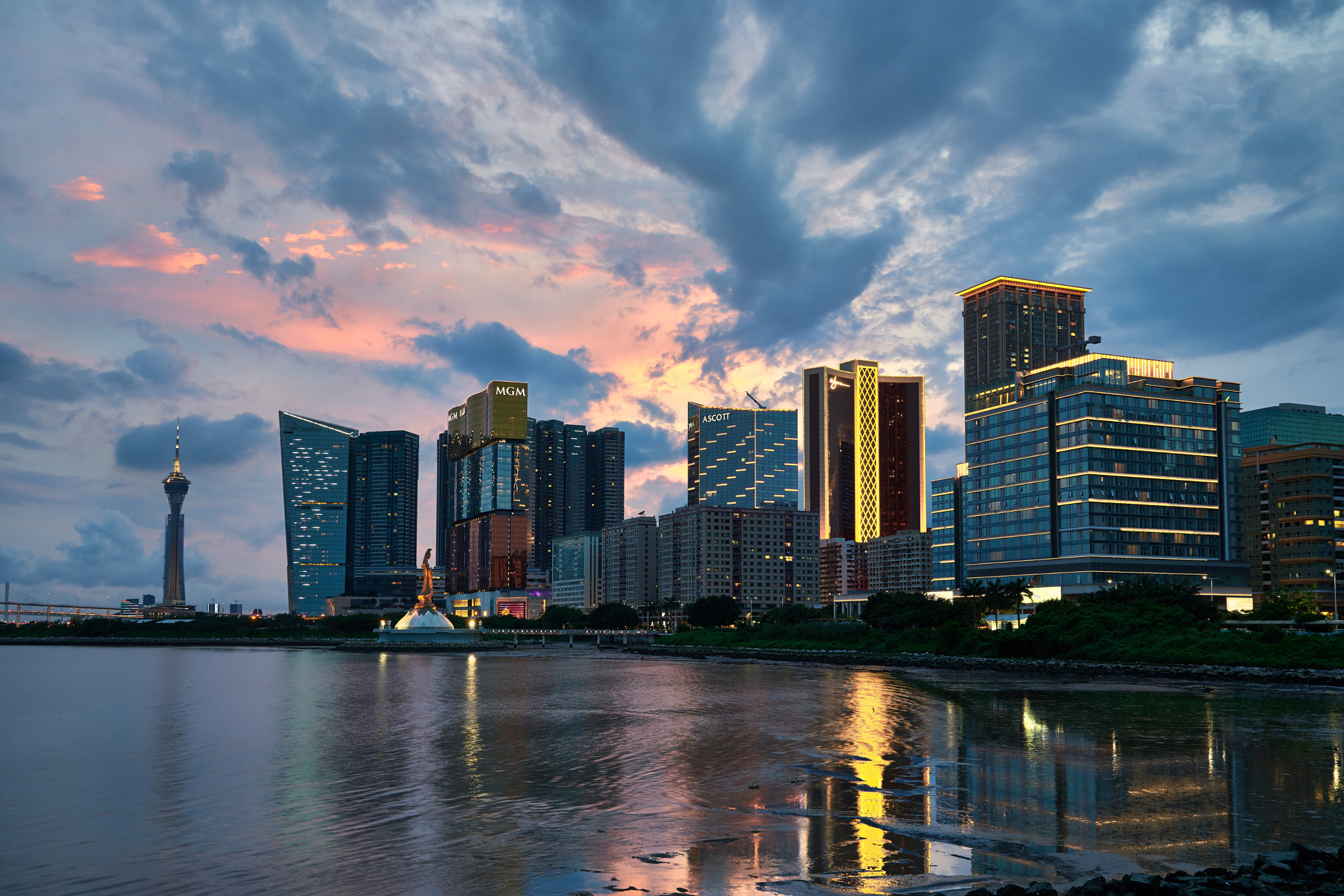
Casinos on Macau's skyline

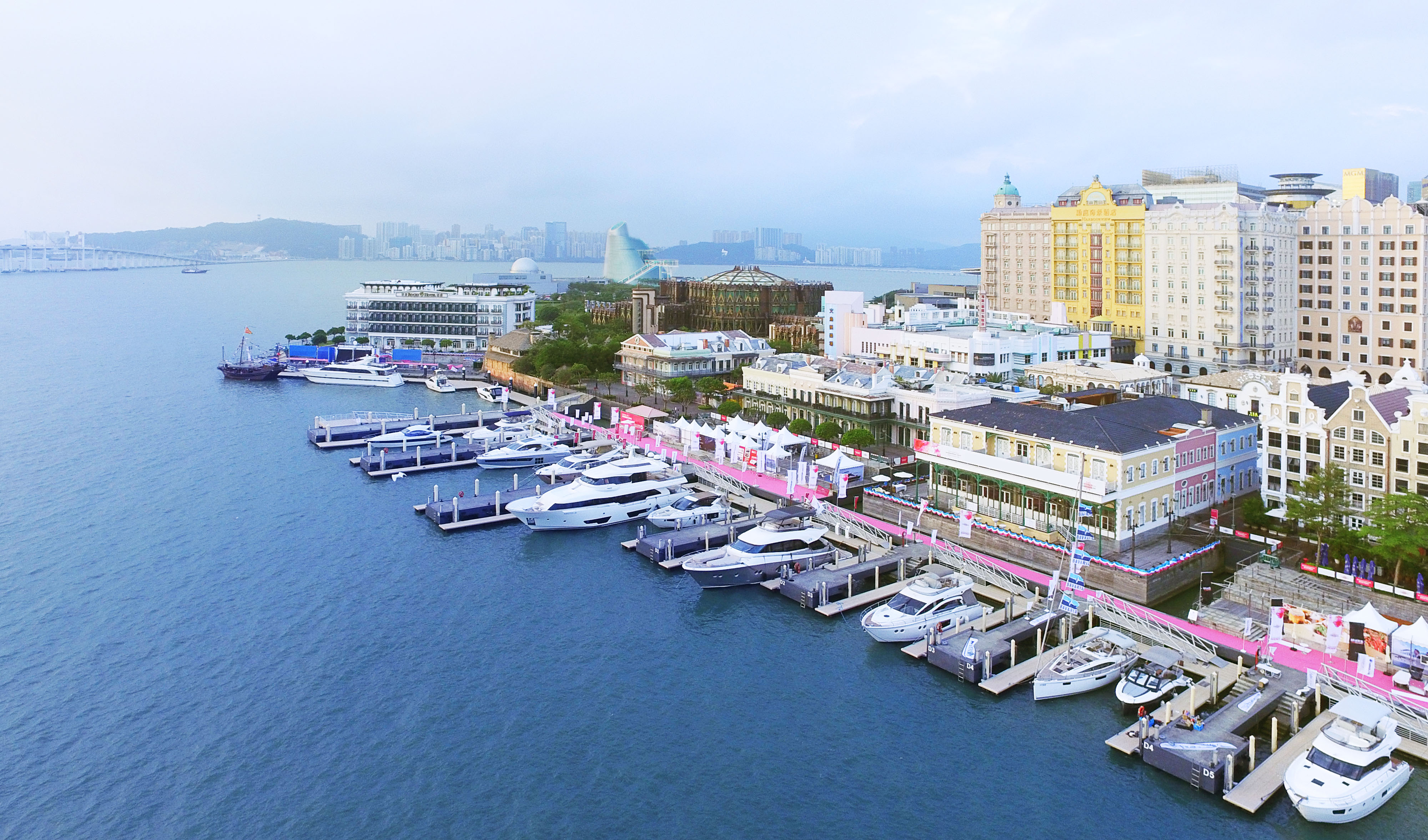
Marina at Macau Fisherman's Wharf

Tourism plays an important role in the economy of Macau, with people from Mainland China being the region's most prolific tourists.

Macau has a capitalist service economy largely based on casino gaming and tourism. It is the world's 83rd-largest economy, with a nominal GDP of approximately MOP433 billion (US$53.9 billion). The GDP per capita was US$69,430 in 2023. Although Macau has one of the highest per capita GDPs, the territory also has a high level of wealth disparity. Macau's gambling industry is the largest in the world, generating over MOP195 billion (US$24 billion) in revenue and being about seven times larger than that of Las Vegas. Macau's gambling revenue was $37 billion in 2018. Taxes from gambling revenues fund a robust welfare system and an annual cash payment to Macau's citizens.

The regional economy is heavily reliant on casino gaming. The vast majority of government funding (79.6 percent of total tax revenue) comes from gambling. Local taxes on personal income, residential property, and retail sales range from non-existent to negligible. Gambling as a share of GDP peaked in 2013 at over 60 per cent, and continues to account for 49.1 per cent of total economic output. The vast majority of casino patrons are tourists from mainland China, making up 68 percent of all visitors. Casino gaming is illegal in both the mainland and Hong Kong, giving Macau a legal monopoly on the industry in China. Revenue from Chinese high rollers has been falling and was forecast to fall as much as 10% more in 2019. Economic uncertainty may account for some of the drop, but alternative Asian gambling venues do as well. For example, Chinese visitors to the Philippines more than doubled between 2015 and 2018, since the City of Dreams casino opened in Manila.

Casino gambling was legalised in 1962 and the gaming industry initially operated under a government-licensed monopoly granted to the Sociedade de Turismo e Diversões de Macau. This licence was renegotiated and renewed several times before ending in 2002 after 40 years. The government then allowed open bidding for casino licences to attract foreign investors. Along with an easing of travel restrictions on mainland Chinese visitors, this triggered a period of rapid economic growth; from 1999 to 2016, Macau's gross domestic product multiplied by 7 and the unemployment rate dropped from 6.3 to 1.9 percent. The Sands Macao, Wynn Macau, MGM Macau, and Venetian Macau were all opened during the first decade after liberalisation of casino concessions. Casinos employ about 24 per cent of the total workforce in the region. "Increased competition from casinos popping up across Asia to lure away Chinese high rollers and tourists" in Singapore, South Korea, Japan, Nepal, the Philippines, Australia, Vietnam and the Russian Far East led in 2019 to the lowest revenues in three years.

Export-oriented manufacturing previously contributed to a much larger share of economic output, peaking at 36.9 percent of GDP in 1985 and falling to less than 1 percent in 2017. The bulk of these exports were cotton textiles and apparel, but also included toys and electronics. At the handover in 1999, manufacturing, financial services, construction and real estate, and gaming were the four largest sectors of the economy. Macau's shift to an economic model entirely dependent on gaming caused concern over its overexposure to a single sector, prompting the regional government to attempt re-diversifying its economy.

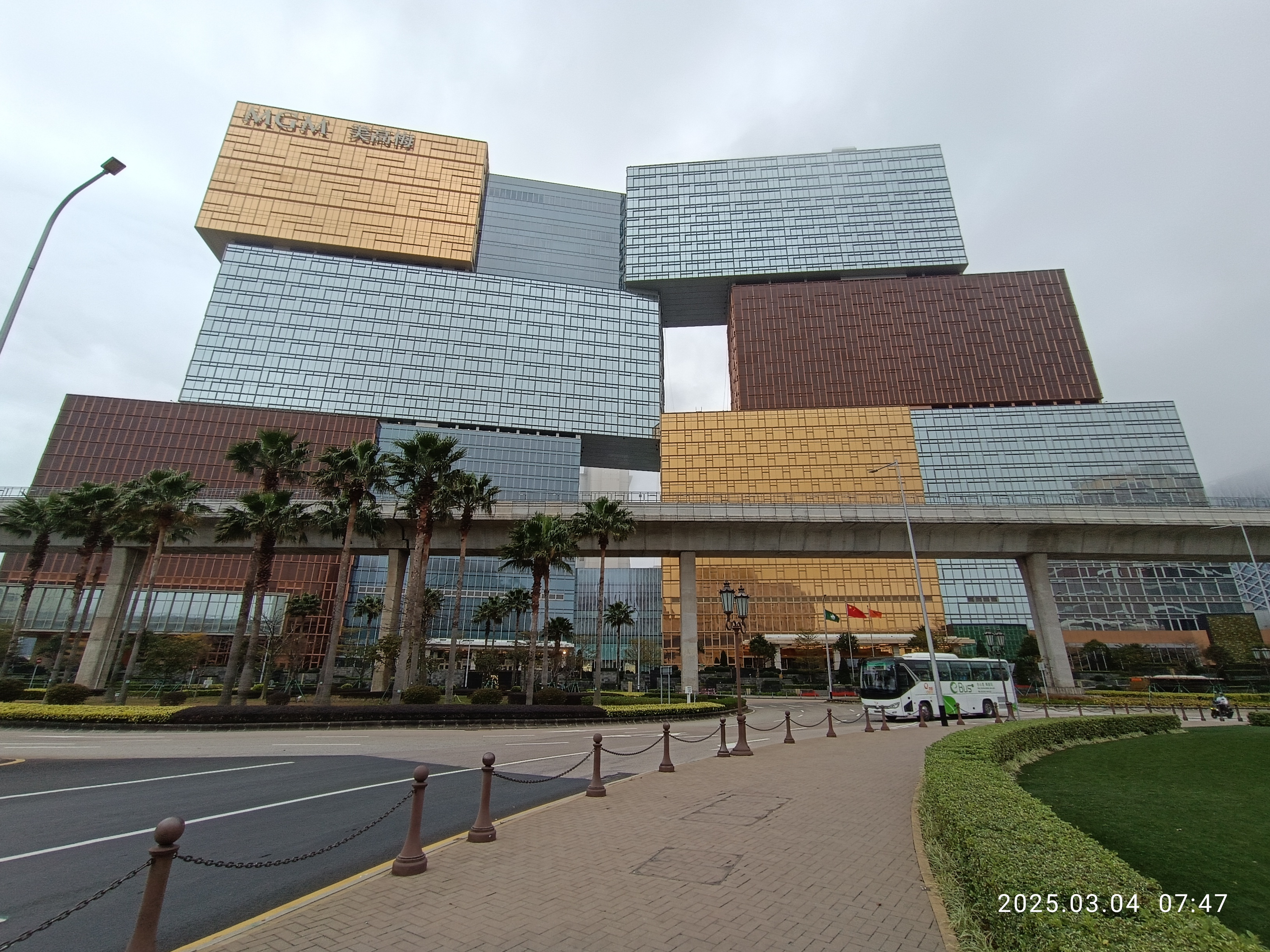
MGM Hotel Macau

The government traditionally had a non-interventionist role in the economy and taxes corporations at very low rates. Post-handover administrations have generally been more involved in enhancing social welfare to counter the cyclical nature of the gaming industry. Economic growth has been attributed in large part to the high number of mainlander visits to Macau, and the central government exercises a role in guiding casino business growth through its control of the flow of tourists. The Closer Economic Partnership Arrangement formalised a policy of free trade between Macau and mainland China, with each jurisdiction pledging to remove remaining obstacles to trade and cross-boundary investment.

Luxury Hotels in the city include, Wynn Palace, The Londoner Grand, The Venetian Macao, The Ritz-Carlton, Mandarin Oriental, Four Seasons Hotel, Wynn Macau and MGM Hotel.

== Transport ==
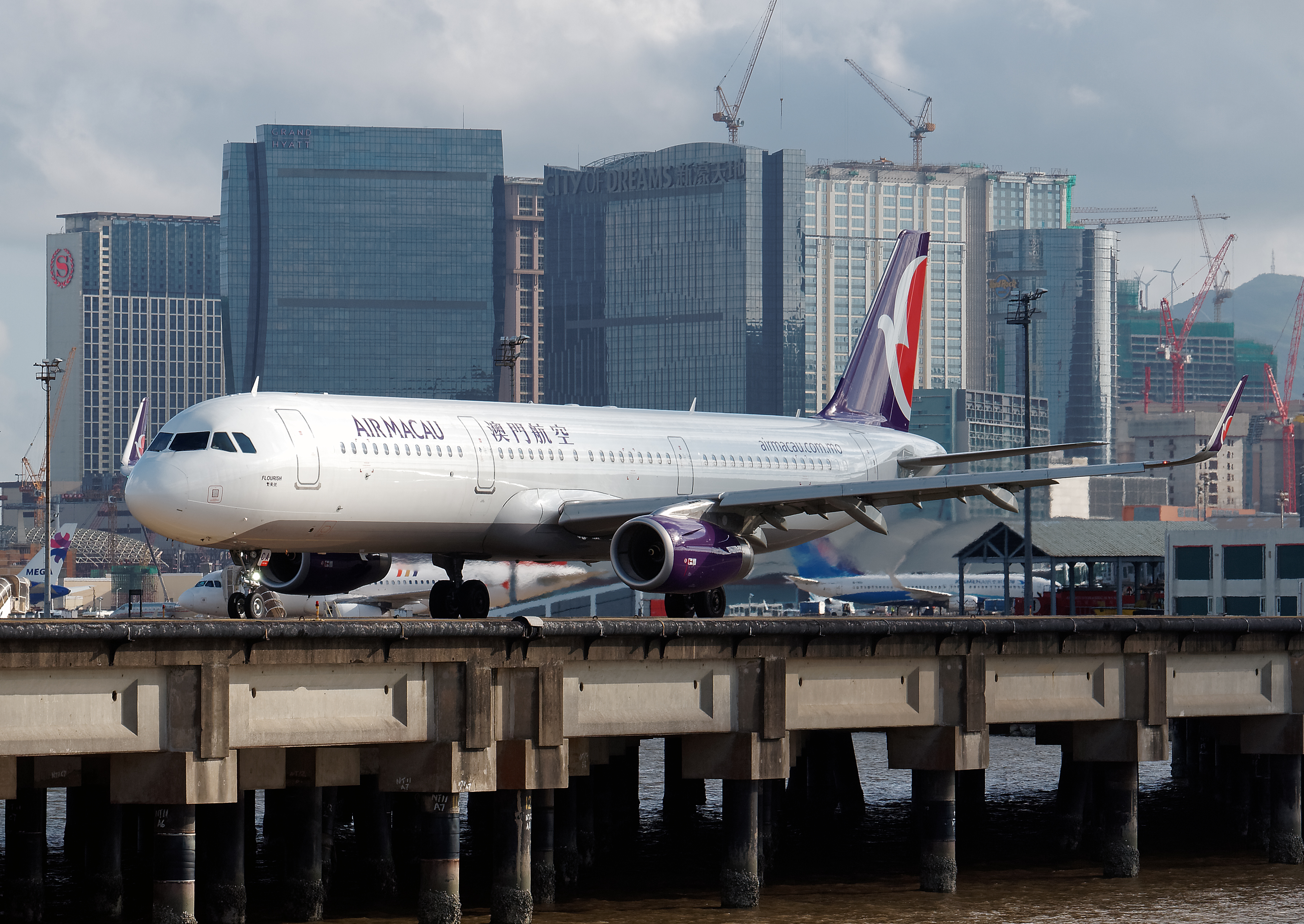
Air Macau Airbus A321 taxiing at Macau International Airport

Macau has a highly developed road system, with over 400 kilometres (250 mi) of roads. Automobiles drive on the left (unlike in both mainland China and Portugal), due to historical influence of the British Empire. Vehicle traffic is extremely congested, especially in the oldest part of the city, where streets are the narrowest. Public bus services operate over 80 routes, supplemented by free hotel shuttle buses that also run routes to popular tourist attractions and downtown locations. About 1,500 black taxicabs are licensed in the territory. Governor Nobre de Carvalho Bridge opened in 1974, Friendship Bridge opened in 1992, Sai Van Bridge opened in 2004 & Macau Bridge opened in 2024 are the 4 bridges connecting Macau & Taipa. Before then, Macau locals would have to take a boat. It made it very inconvenient to cross the Pearl harbour. The Hong Kong–Zhuhai–Macau Bridge, opened in 2018, provides a direct link with the eastern side of the Pearl River estuary. Cross-boundary traffic to mainland China may also pass through border checkpoints at the Portas do Cerco, Lotus Bridge, and Qingmao Port.

Macau International Airport serves over 8 million passengers each year and is the primary hub for local flag carrier Air Macau. Ferry services to Hong Kong and mainland China operate out of ferry terminals such as Taipa Ferry Terminal. Daily helicopter service is also available to Hong Kong and Shenzhen. Phase 1 of the territory's first rail network, the Macau Light Rapid Transit, began operations in December 2019. The Taipa line connects 11 metro stations throughout Taipa and Cotai.

== Healthcare ==
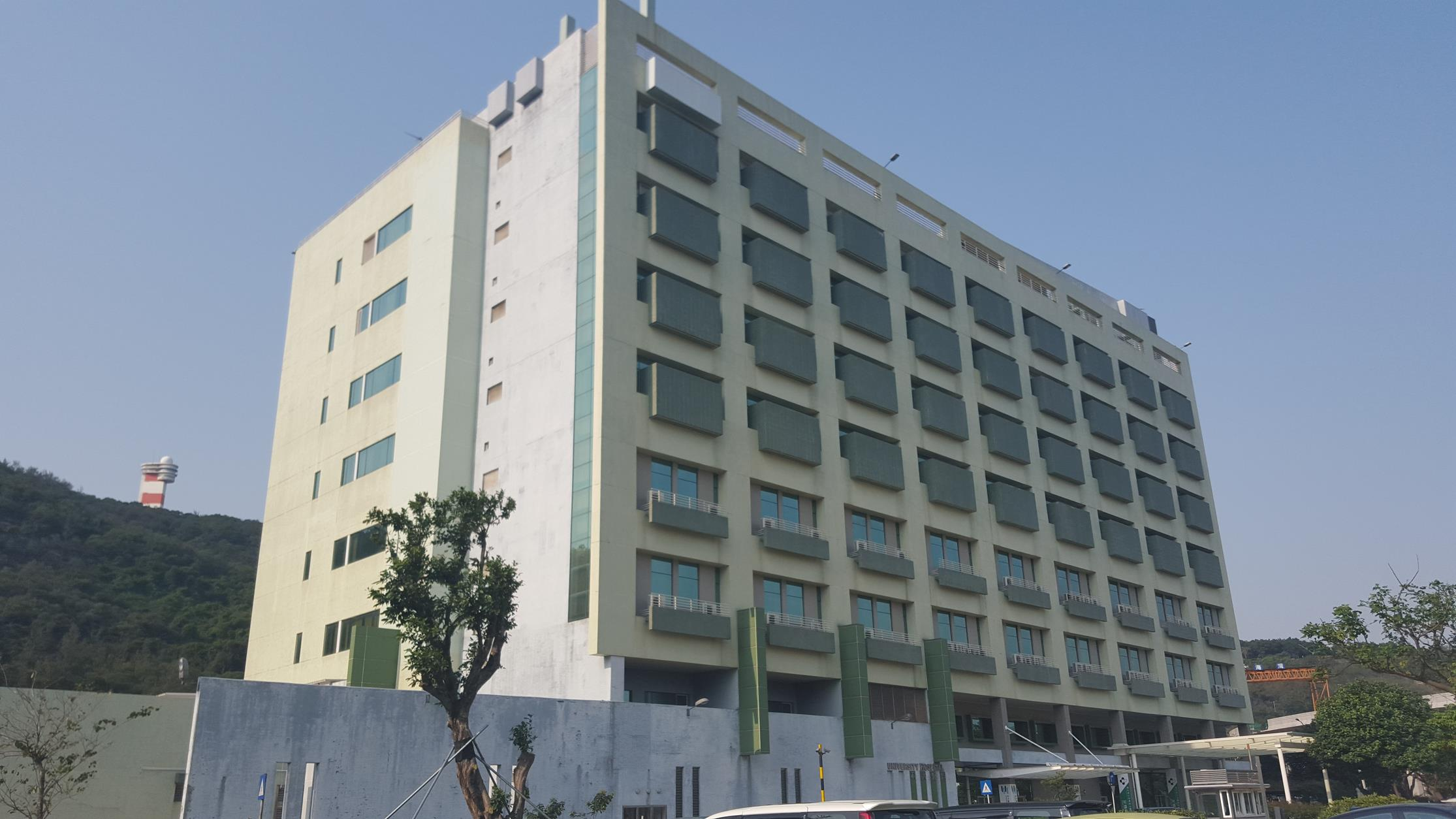
Macau University of Science and Technology Hospital

Macau is served by one major public hospital, the Hospital Conde S. Januário, and one major private hospital, the Kiang Wu Hospital, both located in Macau Peninsula, as well as a university-associated hospital called Macau University of Science and Technology Hospital in Cotai. In addition to hospitals, Macau also has numerous health centres providing free basic medical care to residents. Consultation in traditional Chinese medicine is also available.

None of the Macau hospitals are independently assessed through international healthcare accreditation. A Western-style medical school was opened in Macau in 2019 by the Macau University of Science and Technology, with an annual intake of 50 students. Local nurses are trained at the Macao Polytechnic University and the Kiang Wu Nursing College of Macau. There are no training courses in midwifery in Macau. A study by the University of Macau, commissioned by the Macau SAR government, concluded that Macau is too small to have its own medical specialist training centre.

The Fire Services Bureau is responsible for ambulance service (Ambulância de Macau). The Macau Red Cross also operates ambulances (Toyota HiAce vans) for emergency and non-emergency transport to local hospitals with volunteer staff. The organisation has a total of 739 uniformed firefighters and paramedics serving from 7 stations in Macau.

The Health Bureau in Macau is mainly responsible for coordinating the activities between the public and private organisations in the area of public health, and ensuring the health of citizens through specialised and primary health care services, as well as disease prevention and health promotion. The Macau Centre for Disease Control and Prevention was established in 2001, which monitors the operation of hospitals, health centres, and the blood transfusion centre in Macau. It also handles the organisation of care and prevention of diseases affecting the population, sets guidelines for hospitals and private healthcare providers, and issues licenses.

As of 2016, Macau healthcare authorities sent patients to Queen Mary Hospital in Hong Kong in instances where the local Macau hospitals were not equipped to deal with their scenarios, and many Macau residents intentionally sought healthcare in Hong Kong because they placed more trust in Hong Kong doctors than in Mainland-trained doctors operating in Macau.

== Education ==
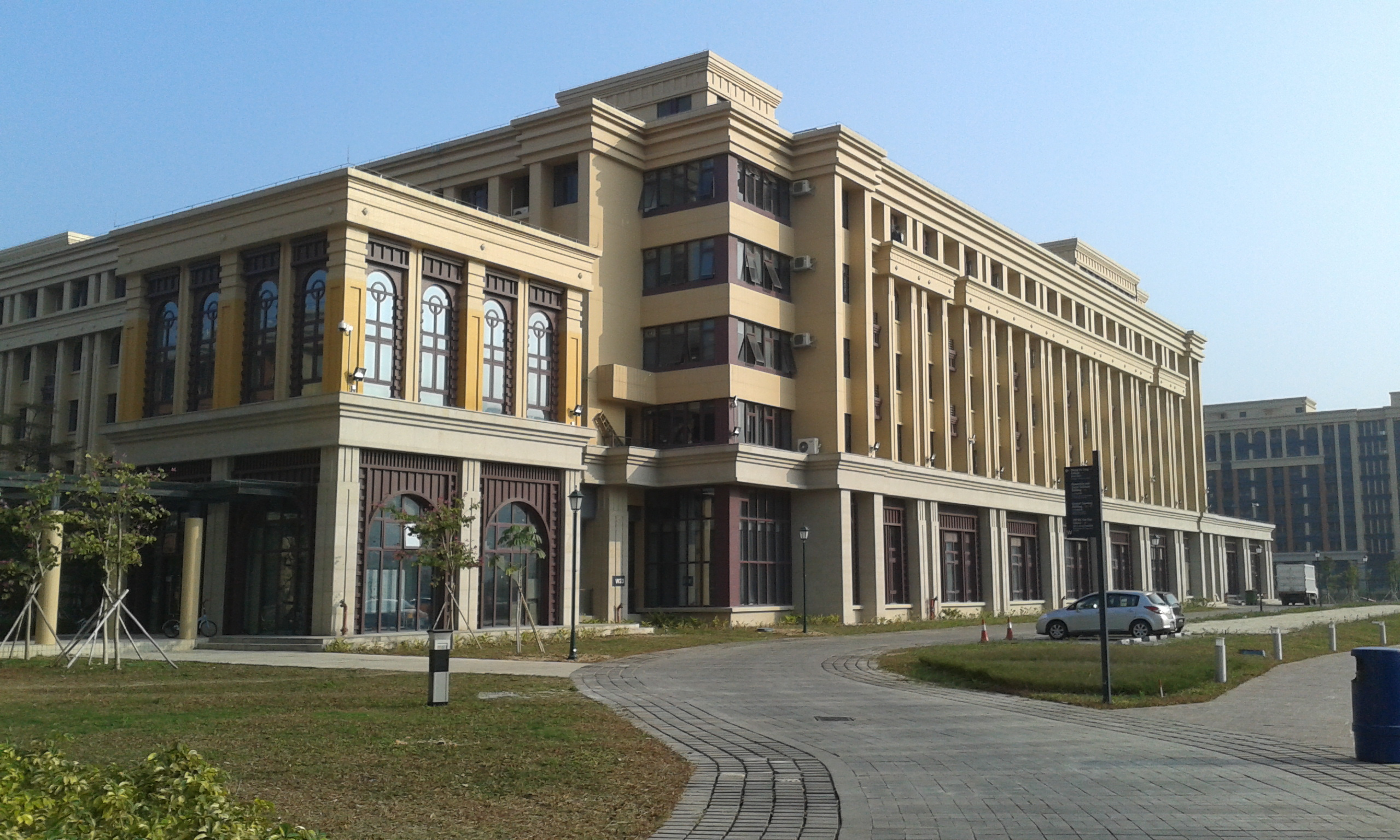
The main campus of the University of Macau is on land leased from nearby Hengqin, in mainland China.

Education in Macau does not have a single centralised set of standards or curriculum. Individual schools follow different educational models, including Chinese, Portuguese, Hong Kong, and British systems. Children are required to attend school from the age of five until completion of lower secondary school, or at the age of 15. Of residents aged 3 and older, 69 percent completed lower secondary education, 49 percent graduated from an upper secondary school, and 21 percent earned a bachelor's degree or higher. Mandatory education has contributed to an adult literacy rate of 96.5 percent. While lower than that of other developed economies, the rate is due to the influx of refugees from mainland China during the post-war colonial era. Much of the elderly population was not formally educated due to war and poverty.

Most schools in the territory are private institutions. Out of the 77 non-tertiary schools, 10 are public, and the other 67 are privately run. The Roman Catholic Diocese of Macau maintains an important position in territorial education, managing 27 primary and secondary schools. The government provides 15 years of free education for all residents enrolled in publicly run schools, and subsidises tuition for students in private schools. Students at the secondary school level studying in neighbouring areas of Guangdong are also eligible for tuition subsidies.

The vast majority of schools use Cantonese as the medium of instruction, with written education in Chinese and compulsory classes in Mandarin. A minority of private schools use English or Portuguese as the primary teaching language. Portuguese-Chinese schools mainly use Chinese, but additionally require mandatory Portuguese-language classes as part of their curriculum.

Macau has ten universities and tertiary education institutes. The University of Macau, founded in 1981, is the territory's only public comprehensive university. The Kiang Wu Nursing College of Macau is the oldest higher institute, specialising in educating future nursing staff for the college's parent hospital. The University of Saint Joseph, Macau University of Science and Technology, and the City University of Macau were all established in subsequent years. Five other institutes specialise in specific vocations or provide continuing education.

== Culture ==
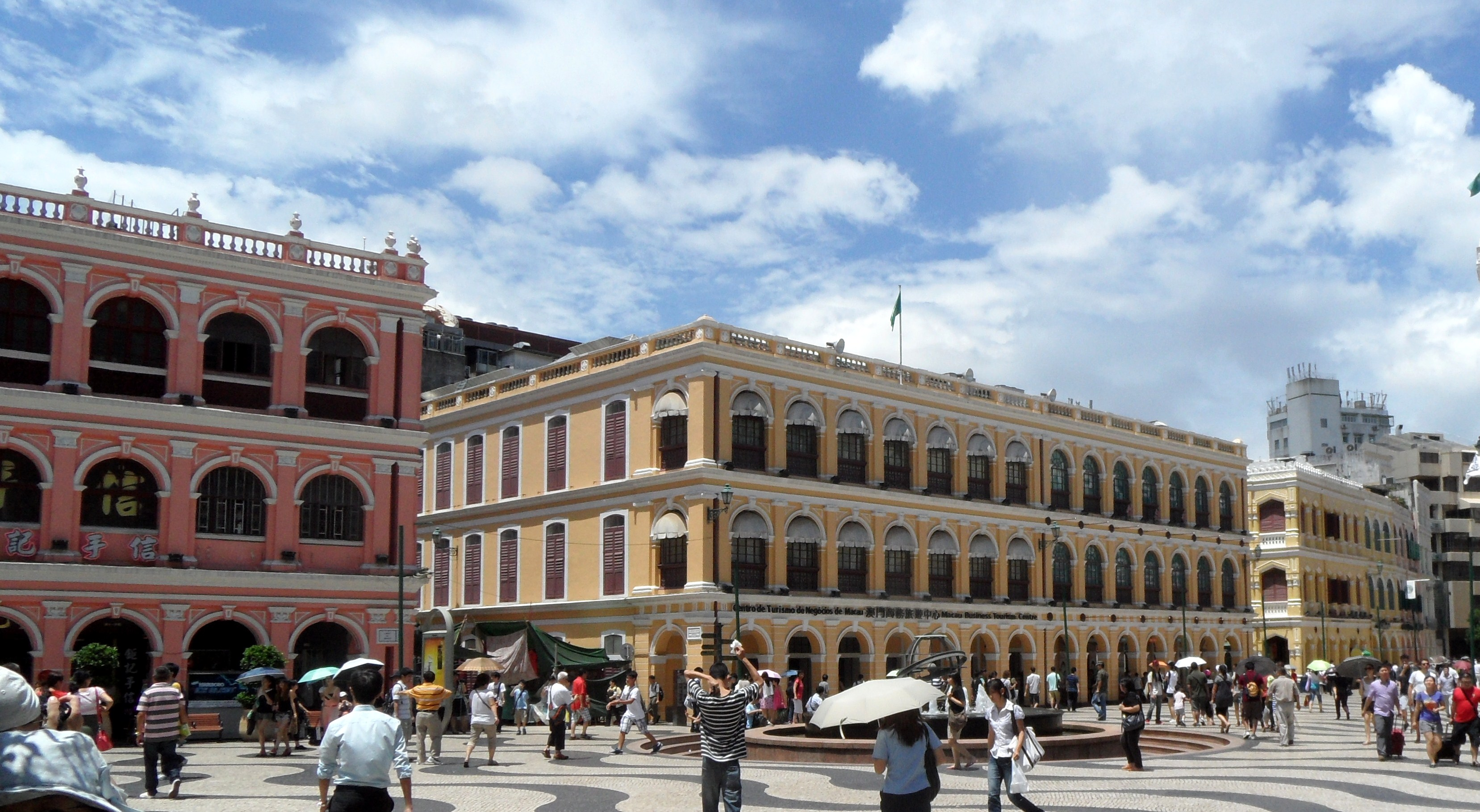
Senado Square

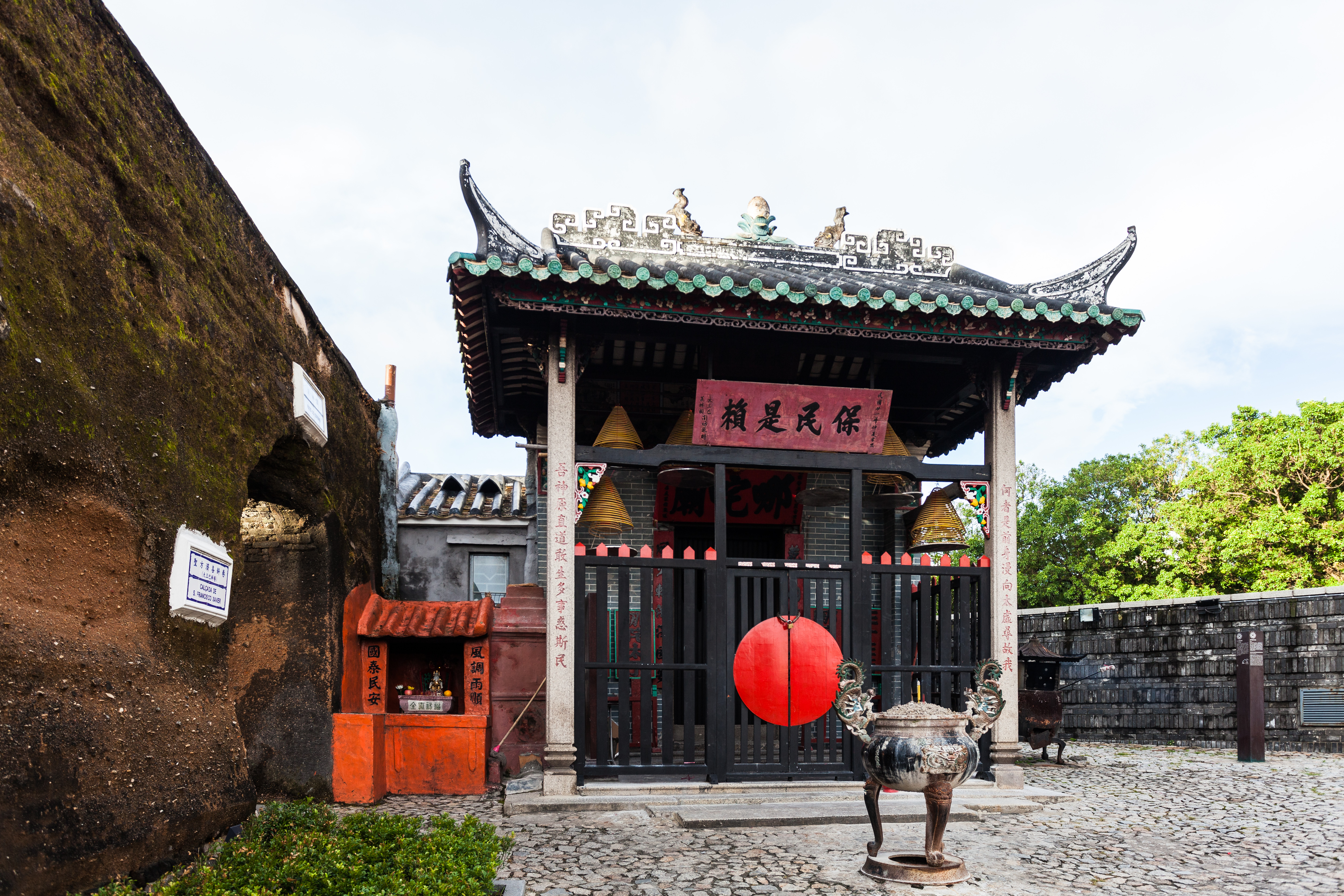
Na Tcha Temple

The mixing of Chinese and Portuguese culture and religious traditions for more than four centuries has left Macau with a collection of holidays, festivals, and events. This includes the Macau Grand Prix held every November, when the main streets of the Macau Peninsula are converted to a racetrack bearing similarities with the Monaco Grand Prix. Other annual events include the Macau Arts Festival in March, the International Fireworks Display Contest in September, the International Music Festival in October or November, and the Macau International Marathon in December.

The Lunar Chinese New Year is the most important traditional festival, and the celebration normally takes place in late January or early February. The Pou Tai Un Temple in Taipa is the place for the Feast of Tou Tei, the Earth god, in February. The Procession of the Passion of Our Lord is a well-known Roman Catholic rite and journey, which travels from Saint Austin's Church to the cathedral, also taking place in February.

The A-Ma Temple, which honours the Goddess Matsu, is in full swing in April with many worshipers celebrating the A-Ma festival. In May, it is common to see dancing dragons at the Feast of the Drunken Dragon and twinkling-clean Buddhas at the Feast of the Bathing of Lord Buddha. In Coloane Village, the Taoist god Tam Kong is also honoured on the same day. Dragon Boat Festival is brought into play on Nam Van Lake in June, and the Hungry Ghosts' festival around late August and early September every year. All events and festivities of the year end with Winter Solstice in December.

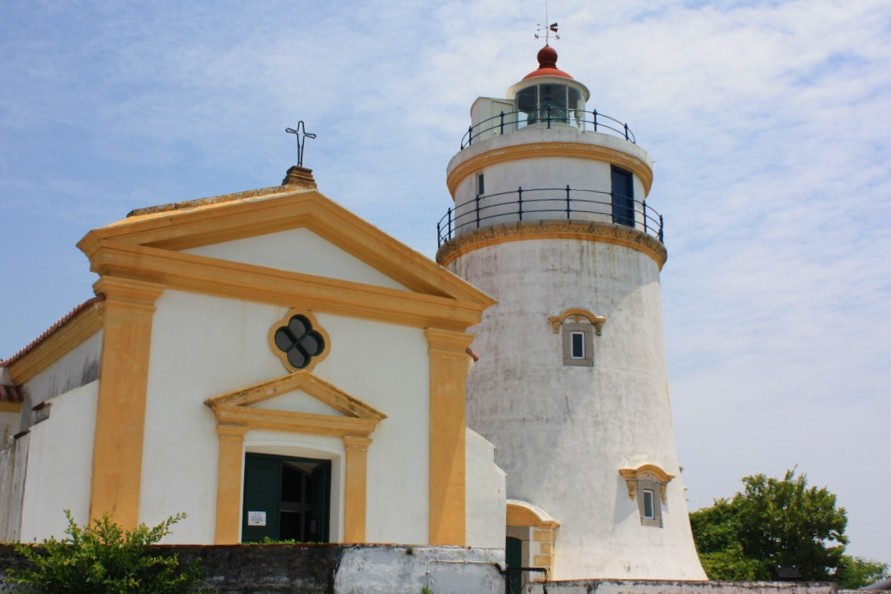
Capela de Nossa Senhora da Guia and Guia Lighthouse at the Guia Fortress

Macau preserves many historical properties in the urban area. Its historic centre, which includes some twenty-five historic locations, was officially listed as a World Heritage Site by UNESCO on 15 July 2005 during the 29th session of the World Heritage Committee, held in Durban, South Africa. However, the Macao government is criticised for ignoring the conservation of heritage in urban planning. In 2007, residents of Macao wrote a letter to UNESCO complaining about construction projects around world heritage Guia Lighthouse (Focal height 108 metres (354 ft)), including the headquarter of the Liaison Office (91 metres (299 ft)). UNESCO then issued a warning to the Macau government, which led former Chief Executive Edmund Ho to sign a notice regulating height restrictions on buildings around the site. In 2015, the New Macau Association submitted a report to UNESCO claiming that the government had failed to protect Macao's cultural heritage against threats by urban development projects. One of the main examples of the report is that the headquarters of the Liaison Office of the Central People's Government, which is located on the Guia foothill and obstructs the view of the Guia Fortress (one of the world heritage symbols of Macao). One year later, Roni Amelan, a spokesman from UNESCO Press service, said that UNESCO has asked China for information and is still waiting for a reply. In 2016, the Macau government approved an 81-metre (266 ft)-tall construction limit for the residential project, which reportedly goes against the city's regulations on the height of buildings around the world heritage site Guia Lighthouse.

=== Cuisine ===
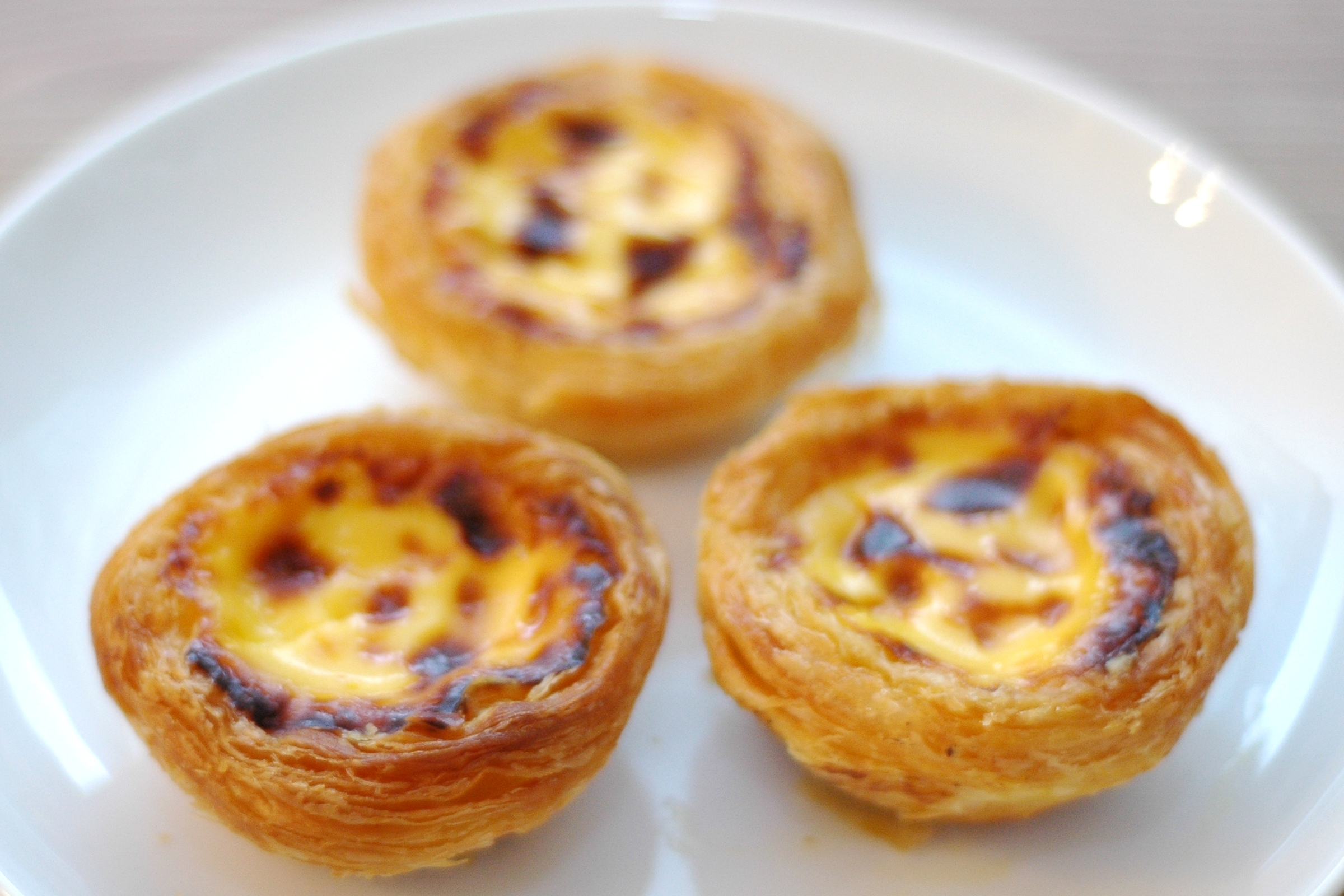
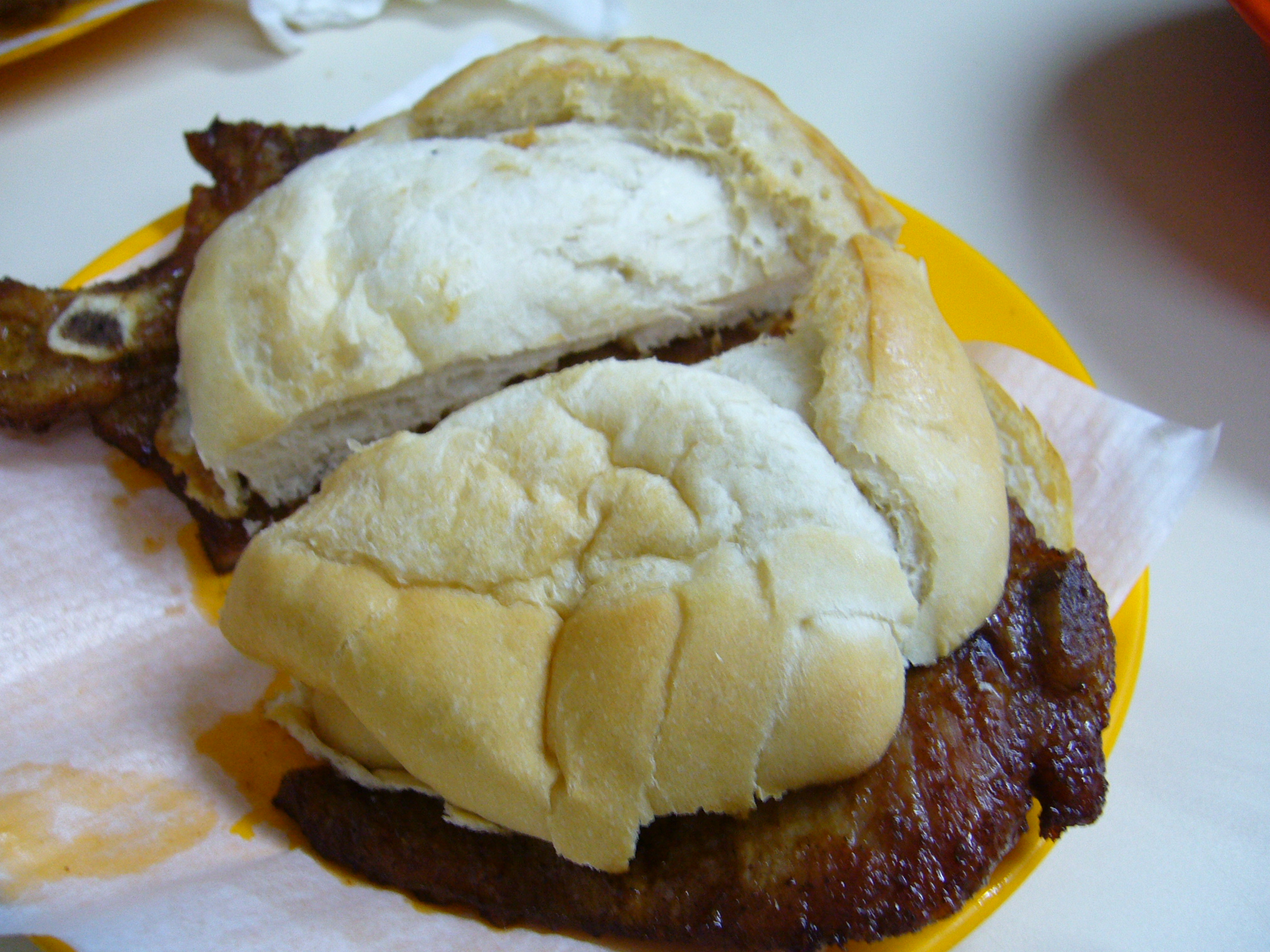
(Left): Macanese-style pastel de nata. (Right): Pork chop buns are popular street snacks.

Minchee

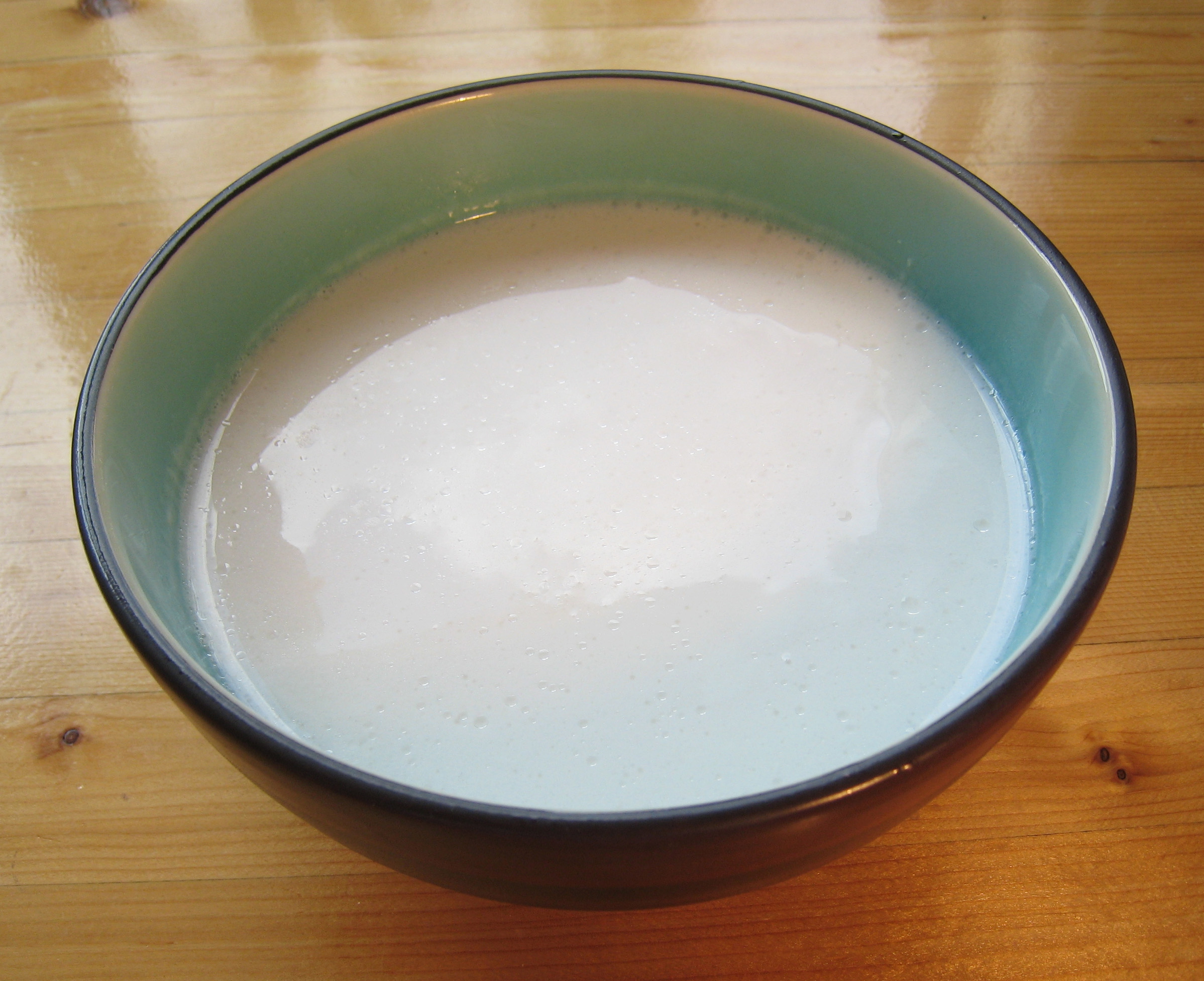
Coconut milk

Food in Macau is mainly based on both Cantonese and Portuguese cuisine, drawing influences from Indian and Malay dishes as well, reflecting a unique cultural and culinary blend after centuries of colonial rule. Portuguese recipes were adapted to use local ingredients, such as fresh seafood, turmeric, coconut milk, and adzuki beans. These adaptations produced local variations of traditional Portuguese dishes including caldo verde, minchee, and cozido à portuguesa. While many restaurants claim to serve traditional Portuguese or Macanese dishes, most serve a mix of Cantonese-Portuguese fusion cuisine. Galinha à portuguesa is an example of a Chinese dish that draws from Macanese influences, but is not part of Macanese cuisine. Cha chaan teng, a type of fast casual diner originating in Hong Kong that serves that region's interpretation of Western food, is also prevalent in Macau. Pastel de nata, pork chop buns, and almond biscuits are popular street food items.

=== Sports ===
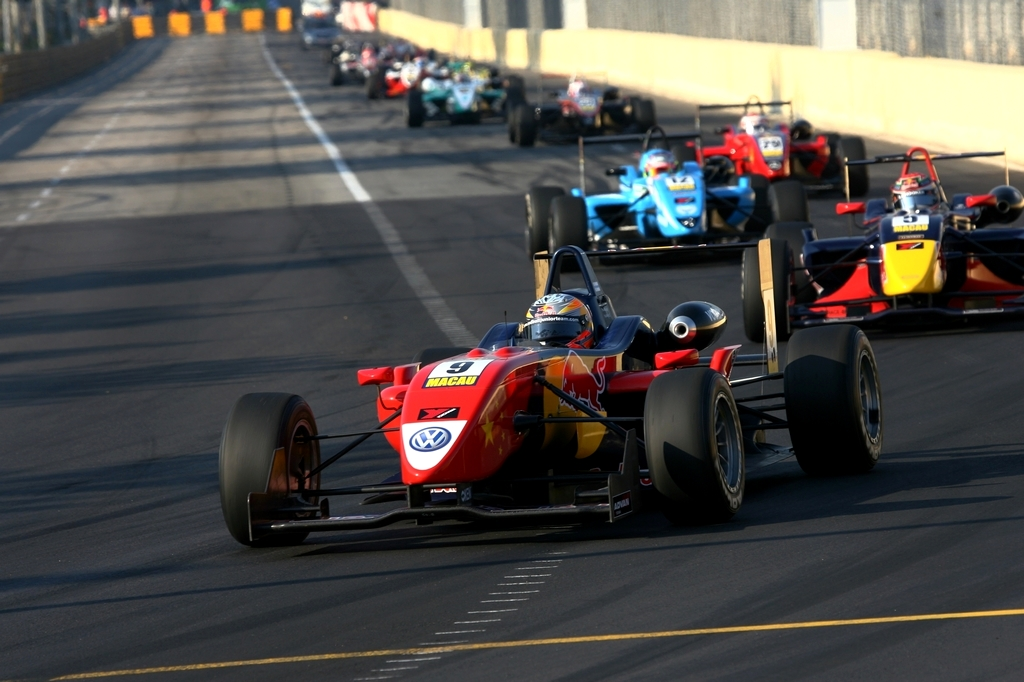
Formula Three racers in the 2008 Macau Grand Prix

Despite its small area, Macau is home to a variety of sports and recreational facilities that have hosted a number of major international sporting events, including the 2005 East Asian Games, the 2006 Lusophony Games, and the 2007 Asian Indoor Games.

The territory regularly hosts the Macau Grand Prix, one of the most significant annual motorsport competitions that uses city streets as the racetrack. It is the only street circuit that hosts Formula Three, touring car, and motorcycle races in the same event. The Guia Circuit, with narrow corner clearance and a winding path, is considered an extremely challenging course and a serious milestone for prospective Formula One racers.

Macau represents itself separately from mainland China with its own sports teams in international competitions. The territory maintains its own National Olympic Committee, but does not compete in the Olympic Games. International Olympic Committee rules specify that new NOCs can only be admitted if they represent sovereign states (Hong Kong has participated in the Olympics since before the regulation change in 1996).

== Twin towns and sister cities ==
Macau has sister cities, listed chronologically by year joined:

- Lisbon, Portugal (1982)
- Uwajima, Ehime, Japan (1987)
- Monte Carlo, Monaco (1992)
- Porto, Portugal (1997)
- Linköping, Sweden (1997)
- Coimbra, Portugal (1998)
- São Paulo, Brazil (2000)
- Praia, Cape Verde (2007)

Additionally, Macau has other cultural agreements with the following cities:

- Brussels, Belgium (1991)
- San Francisco, United States (2001)
- Da Nang, Vietnam (2006)
- Phuket, Thailand (2018)

=== Union of Luso-Afro-Americo-Asiatic Capital Cities ===
Macau is part of the Union of Luso-Afro-Americo-Asiatic Capital Cities from 28 June 1985, establishing brotherly relations with the following cities:

- Bissau, Guinea-Bissau
- Dili, East Timor
- Lisbon, Portugal
- Luanda, Angola
- Maputo, Mozambique
- Panaji (Panjim), India
- Praia, Cape Verde
- Rio de Janeiro, Brazil
- São Tomé, São Tomé and Príncipe

== See also ==
- Cuiheng New Area
- Foreign relations of Macau
- Index of Macau-related articles
- Outline of Macau
- Hong Kong
