= Sino-Portuguese Treaty of Peking =

1887 treaty between China and Portugal

Treaty of Friendship and Commerce between Portugal and China
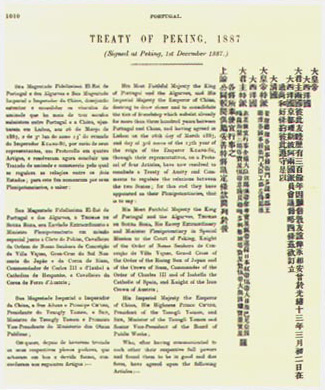
- Signed: 1 December 1887
- Location: Beijing (Peking), China
- Effective: 28 April 1888
- Condition: Exchange of ratifications
- Signatories: Tomás de Sousa Rosa; Yikuang; Sun Iu-uen
- Parties: Portugal; China
- Languages: Portuguese and Chinese

Sino-Portuguese Treaty of Peking

Chinese name
- Traditional Chinese: 中葡和好通商條約
Transcriptions
Standard Mandarin
- Hanyu Pinyin: zhong1 pu2 he2 hao3 tong1 shang1 tiao2 yue1
Yue: Cantonese
- Jyutping: zung1 pou4 wo4 hou2 tung1 soeng1 tiu4 joek3

Alternative Chinese name
- Traditional Chinese: 中葡里斯本草約
Transcriptions
Standard Mandarin
- Hanyu Pinyin: zhong1 pu2 li3 si4 ben3 cao3 yue1
Yue: Cantonese
- Jyutping: zung1 pou1 lei5 si1 bun2 cou2 joek3

Portuguese name
- Portuguese: Tratado de Amizade e Comércio Sino-Português

The Sino-Portuguese Treaty of Peking was a treaty signed on 1 December 1887 between the Kingdom of Portugal and the Qing dynasty. Regarded by China as one of the unequal treaties concluded following the Second Opium War, it granted Portugal perpetual colonial rights over Macau in exchange for its cooperation in curbing the smuggling of opium.

== Background ==
On 13 August 1862, China and Portugal signed the Treaty of Friendship and Trade in Tianjin. The treaty was largely a trade agreement, but it also defined Macau's political and juridical status, although it did not directly mention the issue of Portuguese sovereignty. It contained two clauses regarding Macau's status: Article II annulled earlier agreements and referred to Macau as "formerly in the Province of Canton", while Article III recognised the status of a "Governor General of Macao." However, China did not ratify the treaty and it became void in 1864.

In June 1886, a joint Sino-British commission advised that the administrative responsibility for controlling the import of opium into China should be transferred from the Hoppo in Canton (Guangzhou) to the Chinese Imperial Maritime Customs Service. Although Britain and China agreed to this, it could not be fully successful without Portuguese involvement. In 1887, China sent a diplomatic mission to Lisbon, which included James Campbell, a senior British member of the service, representing the superintendent of the customs service Sir Robert Hart. On 26 March 1887, Campbell and Portuguese Foreign Minister Henrique de Barros Gomes signed the four-point Lisbon Protocol:

1. A Treaty of friendship and commerce with the most favoured nation clause will be concluded and signed at Peking.
2. China confirms perpetual occupation and government of Macao and its dependencies by Portugal, as any other Portuguese possession.
3. Portugal engages never to alienate Macao and its dependencies without agreement with China.
4. Portugal engages to cooperate in opium revenue work at Macao in the same way as England at Hong Kong.

== Terms ==
Portugal followed up on this agreement by sending an envoy to Beijing, where a treaty of amity and commerce based on the protocol was drawn up. On 1 December 1887, the Treaty of Peking was signed by Chinese representatives Yikuang (Prince Qing) and Sun Iu-uen, and Tomás de Sousa Rosa for Portugal on 1 December 1887. It contained 54 articles and was ratified on 28 April 1888. Articles II and III stated:

II. China confirms, in its entirety, the second Article of the Protocol of Lisbon, relating to the perpetual occupation and government of Macao by Portugal.

III. Portugal confirms, in its entirety, the third Article of the Protocol of Lisbon, relating to the engagement never to alienate Macao without previous agreement with China.

According to the Portuguese interpretation, sovereignty over Macau was surrendered to Portugal. In the Chinese interpretation, however, only administrative rights were transferred.

== Aftermath ==
Following the 1887 treaty between Portugal and China, the native population experienced discrimination as they were integrated into legal, bureaucratic, and educational systems that used Portuguese as the official language.

After December 1887, issues related to rent payments and the presence of a Chinese custom house or resident mandarin in Macau became irrelevant outside of academic interest. The early 20th century marked a new era for both countries, with Portugal's 1910 and China's 1911 republican revolutions establishing new governments. A growing nationalist movement in China voiced disapproval of the treaty and questioned its validity. These contentions manifested themselves in the unresolved topic of Macau's border demarcation. Although the Nationalist (Kuomintang) government in China vowed to abrogate the "unequal treaties", Macau's status remained unchanged. The 1928 Sino-Portuguese Treaty of Friendship and Trade reaffirmed Portuguese administration over Macau. In 1945, after the end of extraterritorial rights in China, the Nationalists called for the liquidation of foreign control over Hong Kong and Macau, but they were too preoccupied in the Chinese Civil War with the Communists to fulfill their goals of a "rights recovery" campaign.

After the 1974 Revolution in Portugal, a new decolonisation policy paved the way for Macau's retrocession to the People's Republic of China (PRC). Portugal offered to withdraw from Macau in late 1974, but China declined the offer in favour of a later time because it sought to preserve international and local confidence in Hong Kong, which was still under British rule, as well as its focus on plans to unify Taiwan with the PRC. In January 1975, Portugal recognised the PRC as the sole legitimate government of China and ended ties with the Nationalists in Taipei. In 1976, Portugal unilaterally changed the legal designation of Macau from a "colony" to "territory under Portuguese administration". In 1987, the Sino-Portuguese Joint Declaration was signed and Macau became a "Chinese territory under Portuguese administration". On 20 December 1999—two years after the handover of Hong Kong—Macau was returned to Chinese rule.

A copy of the treaty is kept by the Portuguese government while another copy is kept by the Ministry of Foreign Affairs of Republic of China at the National Palace Museum in Taipei, Taiwan.

== See also ==
- History of Macau
- Western imperialism in Asia
