= Macau delegation to the National People's Congress =

Macau Special Administrative Region Delegation to the National People's Congress
- 澳门特别行政区全国人民代表大会代表
- Delegation for the National People's Congress
- Location of the Macau Special Administrative Region
- Electoral unit: Macau Special Administrative Region
- Number of electors: 481 (members of the election conference)
- Population: 712,651

Current Delegation
- Created: 1999
- Seats: 12
- Head of delegation: Lao Ngai Leong
- Created from: Guangdong delegation
- Election method: Elected by an election conference

The Macau Special Administrative Region delegation to the National People's Congress are the deputies from the Macau Special Administrative Region to the National People's Congress (NPC), the highest organ of state power of the People's Republic of China.

During the Portuguese Macau period, the Macau deputies to the NPC from the 4th to the 9th sessions were elected indirectly by the Guangdong Provincial People's Congress from among its Macau members. According to the Macau Basic Law, all Macau deputies to the NPC must be Chinese citizens residing in Macau. They are nominated by the election procedures and then formally elected. Their qualifications are then submitted to the Credentials Committee of the Standing Committee of the National People's Congress for review, and the Standing Committee of the National People's Congress confirms their qualifications and publishes the list of deputies

== History ==
The history of Macau's deputies to the National People's Congress began in the 4th NPC in 1975. At that time, there were four Macau deputies to the National People's Congress, all of whom participated as deputies of Guangdong Province to the National People's Congress. The five Macau deputies to the 9th National People's Congress elected in 1998 were all elected by the Guangdong Provincial People's Congress. After the establishment of the Macau Special Administrative Region, these five deputies became the Macau SAR deputies to the 9th NPC. After the handover of Macau, the Macau Special Administrative Region elected another seven deputies to the 9th National People's Congress in 2000 in accordance with the election method of that year. Only in early 2000 did Macau's deputies to the National People's Congress cease to be deputies of Guangdong Province and participate in the National People's Congress as a delegation of the Macau Special Administrative Region.

In the 9th and 10th National People's Congress, deputies from Macau had to go through a preliminary election before they could officially participate in the election. However, this preliminary election system was abolished by the fifth session of the 10th National People's Congress on 16 March 2007.

== List of deputies ==
=== Before the handover of Macau ===
Year	NPC session	Deputies	Number of deputies	Ref.
1975	4th	He Xian, Ke Ping, Liang Pei, Xian Weikeng	4	
1978	5th	He Xian, Ke Ping, Liang Pei, Xian Weikeng	4	
1983	6th	Ho Yin (deceased during his term), Ko Ping, Kwong Ping-yan, Tong Sing-chiao, Ma Man-kei (by-election)	4	
1988	7th	Ma Wanqi, Edmund Ho, Zhao Runeng, Ke Ping, Tang Xingqiao	5	
1993	8th	Ma Man-kei, Edmund Ho, Zhao Runeng (deceased during his term), Ko Cheng-ping, Tang Sing-chiao, Yang Sau-man (by-election)	5	
1997	9th	Wang Qiren, Yang Xiuwen, He Houhua, Ke Zhengping, Tang Xingqiao	5	

=== After the handover of Macau ===
Year	NPC session	Deputies	Number of deputies	Ref.
2000	9th	Wang Qiren, Liu Yiliang, Li Chengjun, Yang Yunzhong, Yang Xiuwen, Wu Shiming, He Houhua, Ke Zhengping, He Yicheng, Tang Xingqiao, Huang Fenghua, Pan Yulan	12	
2003	10th	Bai Zhijian, Liu Yiliang, Liu Zhuohua, Li Pengzhu, Yang Yunzhong, Yang Xiuwen (female), Wu Shiming, Chen Qiming, He Yicheng, Gao Kaixian, Huang Fenghua, Cui Shiping, Pan Yulan (female).	12	
2008	11th	Liu Yiliang, Liu Zhuohua, Li Peilin, Lu Bo, Zhao Yinying (female), Lin Xiaoyun (female), Yao Hongming, He Yicheng, Gao Kaixian, Cui Shiping, Liang Yuhua (female), Liang Weite	12	
2013	12th	Liu Yiliang, Li Peilin, He Xueqing (female), Lu Bo, Lin Xiaoyun (female), Yao Hongming, He Yicheng, Gao Kaixian, Rong Yongen (female), Cui Shiping, Liang Yuhua (female), Liang Weite	12	
2018	13th	Liu Yiliang, Wu Xiaoli (female), He Xueqing (female), Lu Bo, Lin Xiaoyun (female), Shi Jialun, ~~He Yicheng~~, Gao Kaixian, Rong Yongen (female), Xiao Zhiwei, Cui Shiping, Li Shiqi, He Jinglin.	12	
2023	14th	He Xueqing, He Jinglin, Wu Xiaoli, Shi Jialun, Rong Yongen, Gao Kaixian, Cui Shiping, Chen Hong, Huang Xianhui, Wen Nenghan, Liu Yiliang, Xiao Zhiwei	12	

=== Members of the Standing Committee of the National People's Congress from Macau ===
- 6th session: He Xian (died in 1983), Ma Wanqi (elected in 1984 at the second session of the 6th National People's Congress)
- 7th session: Ma Wanqi
- 8th session: Edmund Ho
- 9th session: Edmund Ho (resigned in 2000), Ho Iat Seng (elected in 2001 at the Fourth Session of the 9th National People's Congress)
- 10th session: Ho Iat Seng
- 11th session: Ho Iat Seng
- 12th session: Ho Iat Seng
- 13th session: Ho Iat Seng (resigned in 2019)
- 14th session: Ko Hoi-hyun
