= Sino-Portuguese Joint Declaration =

1987 treaty on the administration of Macau

Joint declaration of the Government of the Portuguese Republic and the Government of the People's Republic of China on the Question of Macau

Chinese name
- Traditional Chinese: 中葡聯合聲明
- Simplified Chinese: 中葡联合声明
Transcriptions
Standard Mandarin
- Hanyu Pinyin: Zhōng-Pú Liánhé Shēngmíng
Yue: Cantonese
- Jyutping: Zung^{1}-Pou^{4} Lyun^{4}-hap^{9} Sing^{1}-ming^{4}

Alternative Chinese name
- Traditional Chinese: 中華人民共和國政府和葡萄牙共和國政府關於澳門問題的聯合聲明
- Simplified Chinese: 中华人民共和国政府和葡萄牙共和国政府关于澳门问题的联合声明
Transcriptions
Standard Mandarin
- Hanyu Pinyin: Zhōnghuá Rénmín Gònghéguó zhèngfŭ hé Pútáoyá Gònghéguó zhèngfŭ guānyú Àomén wèntí de Liánhé Shēngmíng
Yue: Cantonese
- Jyutping: Zung^{1}-waa^{4} Yan^{4}-man^{4} Gung^{6}-wo^{4}-gwok^{8} zing^{3}- fu^{2} wo^{4} Pou^{4}-tou^{4}-ngaa^{1} Gung^{6}-wo^{4}-gwok^{8} zing^{3}- fu^{2} gwaan^{1}- jyu^{1} Ou^{3}-mun^{4} man^{6}-tai^{4} dik^{7} Lyun^{4}-hap^{9} Sing^{1}-ming^{4}

Portuguese name
- Portuguese: Declaração Conjunta Do Governo Da República Portuguesa e Do Governo Da República Popular Da China Sobre a Questão De Macau

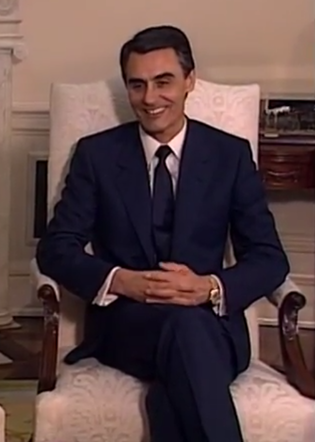
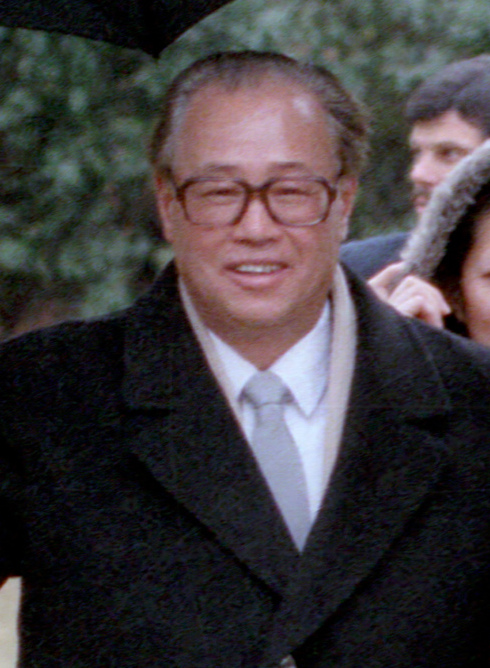
Portuguese Prime Minister Cavaco Silva and Chinese Premier Zhao Ziyang, signatories to the Joint Declaration

The Joint Declaration on the Question of Macau, or Sino-Portuguese Joint Declaration, was a treaty between Portugal and the People's Republic of China over the status of Macau. The full name of the treaty is Joint Declaration of the Government of the Portuguese Republic and the Government of the People's Republic of China on the question of Macau. Signed on 26 March 1987, the Declaration established the process and conditions of the transfer of the territory from Portuguese rule to the People's Republic of China. The Joint Declaration served also as the main source of fundamental rights that were implemented in the Basic Law of the Macau Special Administrative Region. The process was otherwise similar to the handover of Hong Kong to Chinese sovereignty by the United Kingdom in 1997.

== Background ==
By the 16th century, Portugal had leased Macau for a symbolic annual rent of 500 tael from various Chinese governments. Despite remaining under Chinese sovereignty and authority, the Portuguese came to consider and administer Macau as a de facto colony. In 1887, Portugal and the Qing dynasty signed the Sino-Portuguese Draft Minutes and the Sino–Portuguese Treaty of Peking, in which China ceded to Portugal the right to "perpetual occupation and government of Macau"; conversely, Portugal pledged to seek China's approval before transferring Macau to another country. Colonial rule continued until 1974, when the Carnation Revolution installed a democratic regime in Portugal that sought to end colonialism. Bilateral talks between China and Portugal led to the status of Macau being established as Chinese territory under Portuguese administration. The full framework of transfer of sovereignty was decided in 1987 with the Sino-Portuguese Joint Declaration.

== Provisions ==
The declaration provided for Portuguese administration to officially end on 20 December 1999. Although it would become a full part of the People's Republic of China, Macau would enjoy the status of a Special Administrative Region (SAR), with full autonomy and self-governance in domestic affairs, economic policy and internal security. The system of "One country, two systems" would be established, exempting Macau from the socialist system and several laws decreed by the central government in Beijing. The capitalist, legal system and liberal society enjoyed by Macau would remain unchanged for a minimum of 50 years after the transfer. The Chinese government would not levy taxes on Macau nor make laws pertaining to Macau's governance. The Macau SAR would enjoy a great degree of autonomy in all but foreign affairs and defence, which would remain under Chinese control. Bearing the name of "Macau, China," Macau would enjoy the right to conclude agreements and arrangements with Portugal and international organisations for its own development. The Chinese National People's Congress would enact a "Basic Law" that would formalise the respecting of some basic principles of Chinese government in Macau, but leaving other areas untouched.

== See also ==
- China–Portugal relations
- History of Macau
- One Country, Two Systems
- Sino-British Joint Declaration – a similar treaty on the status of Hong Kong
