= List of schools in Macau =

== Tertiary education ==
Universities:

- University of Macau
- Macao Polytechnic University
- Macau University of Science and Technology
- City University of Macau
- University of Saint Joseph
- United Nations University International Institute for Software Technology
- Macao University of Tourism

Institute or other post-secondary education:

- Kiang Wu Nursing College of Macau (Instituto de Enfermagem Kiang Wu de Macau, 澳門鏡湖護理學院)
- Macau Institute of Management (Instituto de Gestão de Macau, 澳門管理學院)
- Macau Millennium College (Instituto Miléno de Macau, 中西創新學院)

== Primary and secondary education ==
Primary and secondary schools and preschools/nurseries/kindergartens are organized by their official Portuguese names. Some institutions may also have official English names.

=== Government schools ===
Preschool through secondary:
- Escola Secundária Luso-Chinesa de Luís Gonzaga Gomes – São Lázaro. Effective the 2022–2023 school year, the school became a "through-train" preschool through secondary school.
- Escola Oficial de Seac Pai Van (石排灣公立學校) – Coloane
- Escola Luso-Chinesa Técnico-Profissional (中葡職業技術學校) – Nossa Senhora de Fátima. Effective 2022, it is to become a "through-train" preschool through secondary school.
- Zheng Guanying Official School – Nossa Senhora de Fátima
Secondary only:
- Macao Conservatory – Multiple location
Preschool and Primary:
- Escola Luso-Chinesa da Taipa (氹仔中葡學校)
- Escola Primária Oficial Luso-Chinesa "Sir Robert Ho Tung" (何東中葡小學) – São Lázaro

=== Tuition-free private schools ===
==== Tuition-free schools with upper secondary education ====
Preschool through secondary school and special education
- Concordia School for Special Education (Escola Concórdia para Ensino Especial; 協同特殊教育學校) – Sé

Preschool through secondary school
- Macau Anglican College (Colégio Anglicano de Macau) – Taipa
- Colégio Mateus Ricci – Santo António
- Colégio de Santa Rosa de Lima (聖羅撒女子中學) Chinese section – Sé
- Sacred Heart Canossian College Chinese: 嘉諾撒聖心中學 (Colégio do Sagrado Coração de Jesus; 嘉諾撒聖心中學) – Santo António
- Yuet Wah College (Colégio Yuet Wah; 粵華中學) – São Lázaro
- Macau Baptist College (MBC; Escola Cham Son de Macau; 澳門浸信中學) – Nossa Senhora de Fátima

- Previously its nursery/primary campus and secondary campus were located in Sé and Nossa Senhora de Fátima, respectively

- Escola Estrela do Mar – São Lourenço
- Fong Chong School of Taipa (Escola Fong Chong da Taipa; 氹仔坊眾學校) – Taipa
- Hou Kong Middle School Macau (Escola Hou Kong; 濠江中學) – The main campus, in Nossa Senhora de Fátima, houses secondary school. There are also separate kindergarten and primary school campuses, both in Santo António, and an affiliated English-based school in Taipa called Premier School Affiliated to Hou Kong Middle School.
- Kao Yip Middle School (Escola Kao Yip) – Sé
- Keang Peng School (Escola Keang Peng) – Nossa Senhora de Fátima
- Kwong Tai (Guang Da) Middle School (Escola Kwong Tai) – Main campus in Nossa Senhora de Fátima, branch campus in Santo António
- Lingnan Middle School (Escola Ling Nam; 澳門嶺南中學) – Sé
- Our Lady of Fatima Girls' School (Escola Nossa Senhora de Fátima; 化地瑪聖母女子學校) – Nossa Senhora de Fátima
- Macau Pooi To Middle School (Escola Pui Tou de Macau; 澳門培道中學) – Main campus in Sé, Taipa Elementary School Branch (澳培道中學氹仔小學分校) in Taipa.
- Pui Va Middle School (Escola Secundária Pui Va; 培華中學) – Taipa
- Escola São Paulo (澳門聖保祿學校) – Nossa Senhora de Fátima
- Tong Nam School (Escola Tong Nam; 東南學校) – Santo António – The secondary school has both junior and senior high divisions
- Escola Tong Sin Tong (同善堂中學) – Sé
- Escola da Associação para Filhos e Irmãos dos Agricultores or Escola Choi Nong Chi Tai (菜農子弟學校 "Choi Nong Chi Tai Hoc Hau") – Nossa Senhora de Fátima
- Affiliated School of the University of Macau (Escola de Aplicação Anexa à Universidade de Macau; 澳門大學附屬應用學校) – Taipa – affiliated with the University of Macau
- Escola dos Moradores de Macau (澳門坊眾學校) – Nossa Senhora de Fátima – Has separate junior high and senior high divisions
- The Workers' Children High School (Escola para Filhos e Irmãos dos Operários; 勞工子弟學校) – Santo António – Operated by the Union for Development (Associação Geral dos Operarios de Macau)
- Instituto Salesiano da Imaculada Conceição – São Lourenço
- Sheng Kung Hui Choi Kou School Macau (Sheng Kung Hui Escola Choi Kou (Macau); 聖公會(澳門)蔡高中學) – Two campuses, with one in Nossa Senhora de Fátima for day secondary school and primary school, and one in Sé for preschool and night secondary school

Combined primary and secondary schools
- Chan Sui Ki Perpetual Help College – São Lázaro
- Colégio de Santa Rosa de Lima English section (聖羅撒英文中學) – Sé
- Sacred Heart Canossian College (Macau) (Colégio do Sagrado Coração de Jesus; 嘉諾撒聖心英文中學) English section – Santo António
- Escola Dom Luís Versíglia (雷鳴道主教紀念學校) – Coloane
- Saint John de Brito School (Escola São João de Brito; 庇道學校) – Santo António
- Macao Sam Yuk Middle School (Escola Secundária Sam Yuk de Macau) – Taipa

Secondary-only schools
- Escola Secundária Técnico-Profissional da Associação Geral dos Operários de Macau (澳門工聯職業技術中學) – Nossa Senhora de Fátima – Has both junior high (Ensino secundário-geral/初中教育) and senior high (Ensino secundário-complementar/高中教育) levels

==== Tuition-free schools without upper secondary education ====
Preschool through junior high school
- Escola de São José de Ká Hó (九澳聖若瑟學校) – Coloane

Combined preschool and primary schools
- Colégio Dom Bosco (Yuet Wah) (鮑思高粵華小學) – Nossa Senhora de Fátima

- The current school building opened in 1963, and Yuet Wah College merged into it in 2000. The school has English and Chinese sections; its Portuguese section closed in 1999.

- Escola Chong Tak de Macau (澳門中德學校) – Nossa Senhora de Fátima
- Escola Dom João Paulino – Taipa
- Escola Fukien (澳門福建學校) – Nossa Senhora de Fátima
- Escola Há Ván Châm Vui (下環浸會學校) – São Lourenço
- Escola Hói Fai (海暉學校) – Nossa Senhora de Fátima
- Escola Ilha Verde da Associação Comercial de Macau (歡迎光臨青洲小學) – Nossa Senhora de Fátima
- Escola Lin Fong Pou Chai (蓮峰普濟學校) – Nossa Senhora de Fátima
- Escola Madalena de Canossa (瑪大肋納嘉諾撒學校) – Nossa Senhora de Fátima
- Escola Santa Maria Mazzarello (聖瑪沙利羅學校) – São Lourenço
- Escola Shá Lei Tau Cham Son (沙梨頭浸信學校) – Santo António
- Escola Tak Meng (德明學校) – Nossa Senhora de Fátima
- Fu Luen School (Escola da Associao Geral das Mulheres de Macau; 澳門婦聯學校) – Nossa Senhora de Fátima
- Escola da Sagrada Família (聖家學校) – Santo António
- Escola de Santa Teresa do Menino Jesus (聖德蘭學校) – Nossa Senhora de Fátima

Preschools
- Jardim Infantil da Cáritas (明愛幼稚園) – Nossa Senhora de Fátima – Located in Edf. Kam Hoi San Garden (金海山花園)

Special education schools
- Escola Cáritas de Macau (明愛學校) – Taipa
- Escola Kai Chi (啟智學校) – São Lázaro

=== Non-free private schools ===
These private schools are not a part of Macau's tuition-free education network.

Preschool through secondary school and special education
- School of the Nations – Taipa
Preschool through secondary school
- Colégio Diocesano de São José (聖若瑟教區中學) – Sé
- Colégio Diocesano de São José 5 – Nossa Senhora de Fátima
- International School of Macao – Taipa
- Pui Ching Middle School – São Lázaro
Primary and secondary school
- Macau Portuguese School (Escola Portuguesa de Macau) – Sé
Secondary school
- Xin Hua Evening Secondary School (Escola Secundária Nocturna Xin Hua/新華夜中學) – Nossa Senhora de Fátima
- Escola Seong Fan (商訓夜中學) – Nossa Senhora de Fátima
Senior high school
- Millennium Secondary School (Escola Secundária Millennium/創新中學) – Sé
Preschool and primary school
- Chan Sui Ki Perpetual Help College (Branch) (Colégio Perpétuo Socorro Chan Sui Ki(Sucursal); 母佑會陳瑞祺永援中學(分校)) – Santo António
Preschool
- St. Anthony's Kindergarten and Nursery (Centro de Educação Infantil Santo António; 聖安東尼幼稚園) – Sé
- Jardim de Infância "D. José da Costa Nunes" (魯彌士主教幼稚園) – São Lázaro

- Managed by the APIM-Associação Promotora da Instrução dos Macaenses, it opened on January 20, 1999. Portuguese is the language of instruction.

Table of all secondary schools in Macau:

Name	Portuguese	Chinese	Image
Sao Jose Diocesan College, 1st & 2nd School	Colégio Diocesano de São José, 1 e 2 Escola	聖若瑟教區中學第二、三校	
Sao Jose Diocesan College, English Section	Colégio Diocesano de São José, Seccão Inglesa	聖若瑟教區中學英文部	
Sao Jose Diocesan College, 5th School	Colégio Diocesano de São José, 5 Escola	聖若瑟教區中學第五校	
Santa Rosa de Lima English Secondary School, Chinese Section	Colégio de Santa Rosa de Lima, Seção Chinês	聖羅撒女子中學中文部	
Santa Rosa de Lima English Secondary School, English Section	Colégio de Santa Rosa de Lima, Seccão Inglesa	聖羅撒女子中學英文中學	
Sheng Kung Hui Choikou School (Macau)	Sheng Kung Hui Escola Choikou (Macau)	聖公會（澳門）蔡高中學	
Holy Rosário School	Escola Do Santíssimo Rosário	聖玫瑰學校	
São Paulo School	Escola São Paulo	聖保祿學校	
Sacred Heart Canossian College	Colégio do Sagrado Coração de Jesus	嘉諾撒聖心中學	
Sacred Heart Canossian College (English Section)	Colégio do Sagrado Coração de Jesus – Secção Inglesa	嘉諾撒聖心英文中學	
Luso-Chinese Technical and Vocational Middle School	Escola Luso-Chinesa Técnico-Profissional	中葡職業技術學校	
Our Lady of Fatima Girls School, Macau	Escola Nossa Senhora de Fátima	化地瑪聖母女子學校	
Tong Sin Tong School	Escola Tong Sin Tong	同善堂中學	
Matteo Ricci College	Colégio Mateus Ricci	利瑪竇中學	
São João De Brito School	Escola São João De Brito	庇道學校	
Tong Nam School	Escola Tong Nam	東南學校	
Estrela Do Mar School Macau	Escola Estrela do Mar	海星中學	
Luís Gonzaga Gomes Luso-Chinese Secondary School	Escola Secundária Luso-Chinesa de Luís Gonzaga Gomes	高美士中葡中學	
Seong Fan Evening College	Escola Seong Fan da Associaçáo Comercial de Macau	商訓夜中學	
Pui Ching Middle School	Escola Secundária Pui Ching	培正中學	
Pui Va Middle School	Escola Secundaria Pui Va	培華中學	
Macau Pooi To Middle School	Escola Pui Tou de Macau	澳門培道中學	
Kao Yip Middle School (Macau)	Escola Kao Yip	教業中學	
Chan Sui Ki Perpetual Help College	Colégio de Chan Sui Kai Socorro Perpétuo	陳瑞祺永援中學	
Millennium Secondary School	Escola Secundária Millennium	創新中學	
The Workers' Children High School, Macau	Escola para Filhos e Irmãos dos Operários de Macau	勞工子弟學校	
Choi Nong Chi Tai School	Escola Choi Nong Chi Tai	菜農子弟學校	
Salesian Institute	Instituto Salesiano	慈幼中學	
Xin Hua Evening Secondary School	Escola Secundária Nocturna Xin Hua	新華夜中學	
Xin Hua School	Escola Sun Wah	新華學校	
Yuet Wah College	Colégio Yuet Wah	粵華中學	
Kwong Tai Middle School, Macao	Escola Secundaria Kwong Tai Macau	廣大中學	
Macau Kung Luen Technical and Vocational Middle School	Escola Secundária Tecnico-Profissional da Associaçáo Geral Dos Operários de Macau	澳門工聯職業技術中學	
Macau Square Public School	Escola dos Moradores de Macau	澳門坊眾學校	
Macau Baptist College	Escola Cham Son de Macau	澳門浸信中學	
Portuguese School of Macau	Escola Portuguesa de Macau	澳門葡文學校	
Macao Conservatory	Conservatório de Macau	澳門演藝學院	
Lingnan Middle School	Escola Ling Nam	嶺南中學	
Hou Kong Middle School	Escola Secundária Hou Kong	濠江中學	
Keang Peng School	Escola Keang Peng	鏡平學校	
Macau Anglican College	Colégio Anglicano de Macau	聖公會中學（澳門）	
Macao Sam Yuk Middle School	Escola Secundária Sam Yuk de Macau	澳門三育中學	
Affiliated School of the University of Macau	Escola de Aplicação Anexa à Universidade de Macau	澳門大學附屬應用學校	
The International School of Macao	Escola Internacional de Macau	澳門國際學校	
School of the Nations	Escola das Nações	聯國學校	
Taipa Fong Chong School	Escola Fong Chong da Taipa	氹仔坊眾學校	
Bishop Luis Versiglia Memorial School	Escola Dom Luis Versiglia	雷鳴道主教紀念學校	

== Former schools ==
Public

- Liceu de Macau (closed in 1998)
- Escola Comercial Pedro Nolasco (closed in 1998) – Macanese people established it in 1878, and it was a middle school with a mainly Macanese student body.
- Escola Primária Luso-Chinesa do Bairro Norte (北區中葡小學) – Nossa Senhora de Fátima

- It opened on 1 November 1990. Effective 2022, it merged into the Luso-Chinese technical school.

- Jardim de Infância Luso-Chinês "Girassol" (樂富中葡幼稚園, "Girassol" means "sunflower") – Nossa Senhora de Fátima

- It occupies a 260 student-capacity, 1,042-square-metre (11,220 sq ft) area on two floors of the Edifício U Wa (裕華大廈). It opened in the Edifício "Lok Fu San Chun" on 27 March 1989 and moved to its current location in September 1997. In 2022 the Macau government announced that it would close.

- Escola Luso-Chinesa de Coloane (路環中葡學校) In 2022 the Macau government announced that it would close.
- Escola Primária Luso-Chinesa da Flora (二龍喉中葡小學) – São Lázaro. Effective the 2022–2023 school year, students of the Portuguese section of the school were integrated into the Escola Secundária Luso-Chinesa de Luís Gonzaga Gomes, and the rest were integrated into the Escola Primária Oficial Luso-Chinesa "Sir Robert Ho Tung".

Private

- Escola do Santíssimo Rosário – Santo António (closed in 2017)
- Sheng Kung Hui Taipa Primary School
  - It was an Anglican school operated by the Sheng Kung Hui, and opened in September 2002. In 2004 it served 500 students in levels K1 through P3. Most of the students were Macau permanent residents with some coming from Russia, South America, the United Kingdom, and other countries. The ratio of instruction in English and Standard Chinese respectively was 70 to 30.
  - Jose F Pereira Chan designed the campus, located in a downhill direction from what was the International Library of UMAC.

== See also ==
- Education in Macau
- List of universities in Macau
