= Ricci =

Ricci (pronounced [ˈrittʃi]) is an Italian surname.

== Notable Riccis ==
=== Arts and entertainment ===
- Angelo Maria Ricci (1946–2025), Italian comics artist
- Antonio Ricci (painter) (c. 1565–c. 1635), Spanish Baroque painter of Italian origin
- Christina Ricci (born 1980), American actress
- Clara Ross Ricci (1858–1954), British composer
- Elena Sofia Ricci (born 1962), Italian actress
- Federico Ricci (1809–77), Italian composer
- Franco Maria Ricci (1937–2020), Italian art publisher
- Italia Ricci (born 1986), Canadian actress
- Jason Ricci (born 1974), American blues harmonica player
- Lella Ricci (1850–71), Italian singer
- Luigi Ricci (1805–59), Italian composer
- Luigi Ricci (1893–1981), Italian vocal coach
- Luigi Ricci-Stolz (1852–1906), Italian composer
- Marco Ricci (1676–1730), Italian Baroque painter
- Nahéma Ricci, Canadian actress
- Nina Ricci (designer) (1883–1970), French fashion designer
- Nino Ricci (born 1959), Canadian novelist
- Regolo Ricci (born 1955), Canadian painter and illustrator
- Romina Ricci (born 1978), Argentine actress
- Ruggiero Ricci (1918–2012), American violinist
- Santiago Ricci, Argentine film editor
- Sebastiano Ricci (1659–1734), Venetian Baroque painter
- Stefano Ricci (sculptor) (1765–1837), Italian sculptor
- Ulysses Ricci (1888–1960), American architectural sculptor

=== Mathematics ===
- Giovanni Ricci (mathematician) (1904–1973), Italian mathematician
- Gregorio Ricci-Curbastro (1853–1925), Italian mathematician (Ricci curvature)
- Michelangelo Ricci (1619–82), Italian Cardinal and mathematician
- Ostilio Ricci (1540–1603), Italian mathematician

=== Religion ===
- Arcasio Ricci (1590–1636), Roman Catholic Bishop
- Lorenzo Ricci (1703–75), 18th Superior General of the Jesuits
- Matteo Ricci (1552–1610), Jesuit Major General who led missions into China
- Michelangelo Ricci (1619–82), Italian Cardinal and mathematician
- Regolo Ricci (born 1955), Canadian painter and illustrator

=== Sport ===
- Austin Ricci (born 1996), Canadian soccer player
- Christie Ricci (born 1982), American wrestler
- Donatella Ricci (born 1963), Italian sport pilot and astrophysicist
- Fausto Ricci (born 1961), Italian motorcycle racer
- Francesco Ricci Bitti (born 1942), Italian sports administrator
- Giampaolo Ricci (born 1991), Italian basketball player
- Giovanni Ricci (American football) (born 1996), American football player
- Mike Ricci (born 1971), Canadian ice hockey player
- Renato Ricci (Australian footballer) (born 1940), Australian footballer
- Renato Ricci (Italian footballer) (born 1991), Italian footballer
- Sandro Ricci (born 1974), Brazilian football referee
- Secondo Ricci (1913–1984), Italian footballer

=== Other ===
- Elisa Ricci, Italian computer scientist
- Giovanni Ricci (disambiguation), multiple people
- Kenn Ricci (fl. 1981–2015), aviation entrepreneur
- Lawrence Ricci (1945–2005), Genovese family capo
- Matteo Ricci (disambiguation), multiple people
  - Matteo Ricci (footballer, born February 1994), Italian football goalkeeper
  - Matteo Ricci (footballer, born May 1994), Italian football midfielder
  - Matteo Ricci (politician) (born 1972), Italian politician
- Nina Ricci (designer) (1883–1970), French fashion designer
- Renato Ricci (1896–1956), Italian Fascist politician
- Rich Ricci (born 1964), American-British banker and racehorse owner
- Umberto Ricci (1879–1946), Italian academic and economist

=== Given name ===
- Ricci Greenwood (born 1973), American footballer
- Ricci Harnett (born 1975), English actor
- Ricci Woodard, American softball coach

=== See also ===
- 13642 Ricci, asteroid named after Gregorio Ricci-Curbastro
- Colégio Mateus Ricci, Roman Catholic primary and secondary school in Macau
- Matteo Ricci College, Jesuit college program that is affiliated with Seattle University
- Ricci v. DeStefano, 2009 U.S. court case concerning affirmative action
- Nina Ricci (brand), fashion house founded by Nina Ricci
