= Matteo Ricci (disambiguation) =

Matteo Ricci (1552–1610) was an Italian Jesuit priest who led Jesuit missions in China.

Matteo Ricci may also refer to:

- Colégio Mateus Ricci, Roman Catholic primary and secondary school in Macau
- Collège Matteo Ricci, a secondary school in Brussels, Belgium
- Matteo Ricci College, Jesuit college program that is affiliated with Seattle University
- Matteo Ricci (footballer, born February 1994), Italian football goalkeeper
- Matteo Ricci (footballer, born May 1994), Italian football midfielder
- Matteo Ricci (politician) (born 1972), Italian politician
