= Education in Macau =

Most schools in Macau are either private or government-subsidised. As of the 2023–2024 school year, there were 76 schools in total, including eight public schools and 68 private institutions. Of the 73 schools that offered formal education, six were not part of Macau's free education network. As of 2006, many of the schools in Macau were operated by Catholic organisations.

Macau offers 15 years of compulsory, free education to pupils who are enrolled in schools that meet certain government-stipulated criteria.

The majority of schools in Macau are grammar schools, which provide education in languages, mathematics, science, and social studies, among other subjects. There are also a few vocational schools in Macau, which offer technical training in fields such as automotive repair, electronics, and construction.

According to Chapter VI, Article 121 of the Basic Law of Macau, the Government of Macau is responsible for independently formulating policies on education. This includes policies regarding the educational system and its administration, the language of instruction, the allocation of funds, the examination system, the recognition of educational qualifications and the system of academic awards so as to promote educational development. The government shall also in accordance with law, gradually institute a compulsory education system. Community organisations and individuals may, in accordance with law, run educational undertakings of various kinds.

== History ==
According to Sou-kuan Vong and Matilda Wong of the University of Macau, the prevalence of private schools in Macau is due to the Portuguese Macau government practice of not involving itself in educational matters.

By the early 1950s pro-Communist and pro-Nationalist forces competed over how much influence they had in Macau's education system. Christian schools in Macau gained strength at the expense of secular schools since the Christian schools received support from Christian organisations: the Roman Catholic Diocese of Macau assisted the Catholic schools, and various churches based in and outside of Macau assisted the Protestant schools. There were ten schools affiliated with Nationalist forces in Macau during the early 1960s, and at the time the Nationalist forces had more influence than Communist ones. After 1967 and 1968 riots disrupted Nationalist forces, that faction's schools closed.

As of the 1990s secular private schools, including those supported by the pro-mainland Macau Chinese Education System, other welfare organisations, and philanthropists; and the Christian schools had about equal amounts of influence and numbers of students.

== System of education ==
At present, most schools in Macau follow a so-called "local education system". Six years of primary school education, three years for junior secondary school education and three years for senior secondary school education up to Form 6. In their senior secondary school years, students are usually required to study science, commerce, arts and music.

Pupils who plan to study further would usually sit for the exam organised by the higher education institutes, or international assessment bodies like Edexcel, CIE and College Board, or the related government bodies in China.

=== School grade ===
Typical age	Grade/Level	Curriculum stages		Schools	
3–4	N/A	Infant education 幼兒教育; Pré-escolar		Kindergarten 幼稚園; Jardim de infância	
4–5	N/A	Infant education 幼兒教育; Pré-escolar		Kindergarten 幼稚園; Jardim de infância	
5–6	N/A	Infant education 幼兒教育; Pré-escolar		Kindergarten 幼稚園; Jardim de infância	
6–7	Primary 1	Primary education 小學教育; Ensino primário		Primary school 小學; Escola primária	
7–8	Primary 2	Primary education 小學教育; Ensino primário		Primary school 小學; Escola primária	
8–9	Primary 3	Primary education 小學教育; Ensino primário		Primary school 小學; Escola primária	
9–10	Primary 4	Primary education 小學教育; Ensino primário		Primary school 小學; Escola primária	
10–11	Primary 5	Primary education 小學教育; Ensino primário		Primary school 小學; Escola primária	
11–12	Primary 6	Primary education 小學教育; Ensino primário		Primary school 小學; Escola primária	
12–13	Form 1	Junior secondary education 初中教育; Ensino secundário-geral		Junior secondary school 初中; Escola secundária geral	
13–14	Form 2	Junior secondary education 初中教育; Ensino secundário-geral		Junior secondary school 初中; Escola secundária geral	
14–15	Form 3	Junior secondary education 初中教育; Ensino secundário-geral		Junior secondary school 初中; Escola secundária geral	
15–16	Form 4	Senior secondary education 高中教育; Ensino secundário-complementar	Vocational and technical education 職業技術教育; Ensino técnico-profissional	Senior secondary school 高中; Escola secundária complementar	Vocational school 職業技術學校; Escola técnico-profissional
16–17	Form 5	Senior secondary education 高中教育; Ensino secundário-complementar	Vocational and technical education 職業技術教育; Ensino técnico-profissional	Senior secondary school 高中; Escola secundária complementar	Vocational school 職業技術學校; Escola técnico-profissional
17–18	Form 6	Senior secondary education 高中教育; Ensino secundário-complementar	Vocational and technical education 職業技術教育; Ensino técnico-profissional	Senior secondary school 高中; Escola secundária complementar	Vocational school 職業技術學校; Escola técnico-profissional

== Mediums of instruction ==
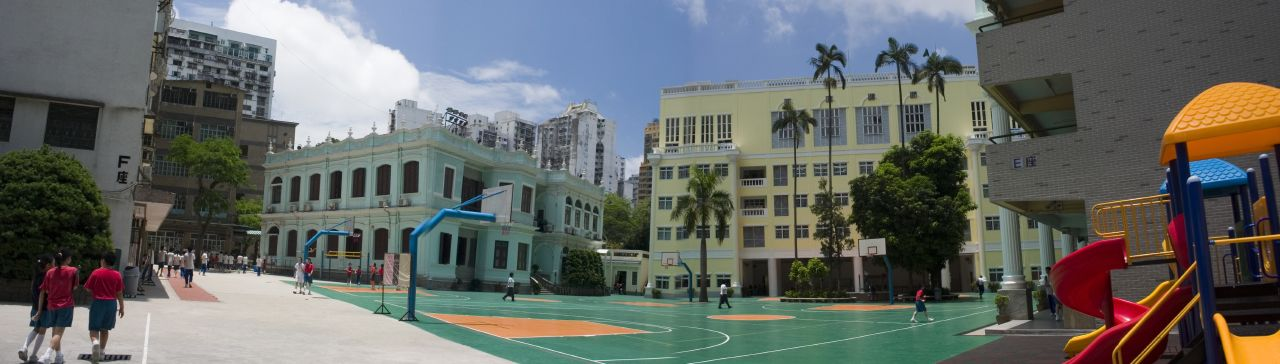
Pui Ching, a secondary school in Macau

The majority of schools offer both Cantonese and English education, and either Cantonese or English is the medium in most schools at the primary and secondary levels. Chinese-Medium-of-Instruction (CMI) schools adopt Cantonese as the medium of instruction for almost all classes. English-Medium-of-Instruction (EMI) schools generally adopt English as the medium of instruction. English is used almost exclusively at the tertiary level.

Macau Portuguese School is currently the only school in Macau offering curricula similar to those of Portugal and a Portuguese-language education for pupils from 1st grade to 12th grade.

The Escola Secundária Luso-Chinesa de Luís Gonzaga Gomes is a public school that has a Chinese and a Portuguese section. The Escola Oficial Zheng Guanying is a pilot project of the government that conducts classes in Mandarin, Portuguese, and English.

There are some students with origins from Macau, Hong Kong, or mainland China who natively speak a variety of Chinese but who have education in English.

== Primary, secondary, and vocational education ==
In the 2007–2008 school year, Macau had 55 private preschool, primary and secondary schools with subsidised tuition, 15 private preschool, primary and secondary schools without subsidised tuition, and 13 government preschool, primary and secondary schools, with a total of 83 primary and secondary schools. These schools altogether had 80,223 students and 4,610 teachers.

As of 2017 Macau parents generally choose schools by their reputations, since Macau does not have territory-wide standard examinations, and there is a preference for religious schools among upper-class parents due to a perceived higher quality of education. As of 2017 the 27 Catholic schools in Macau made up about 36.4% of the educational sectors other than tertiary education.

Since 2007, in accordance with the general education goal of "Love China, love Macau ", China People Education Press in China, which is the official press affiliated to the Ministry of Education of China, has cooperated with the Macao Education and Youth Bureau to compile and publish three textbooks for Macao primary and secondary schools, including the "History" and "Character and Citizenship" and " Geography ".

== Higher education ==
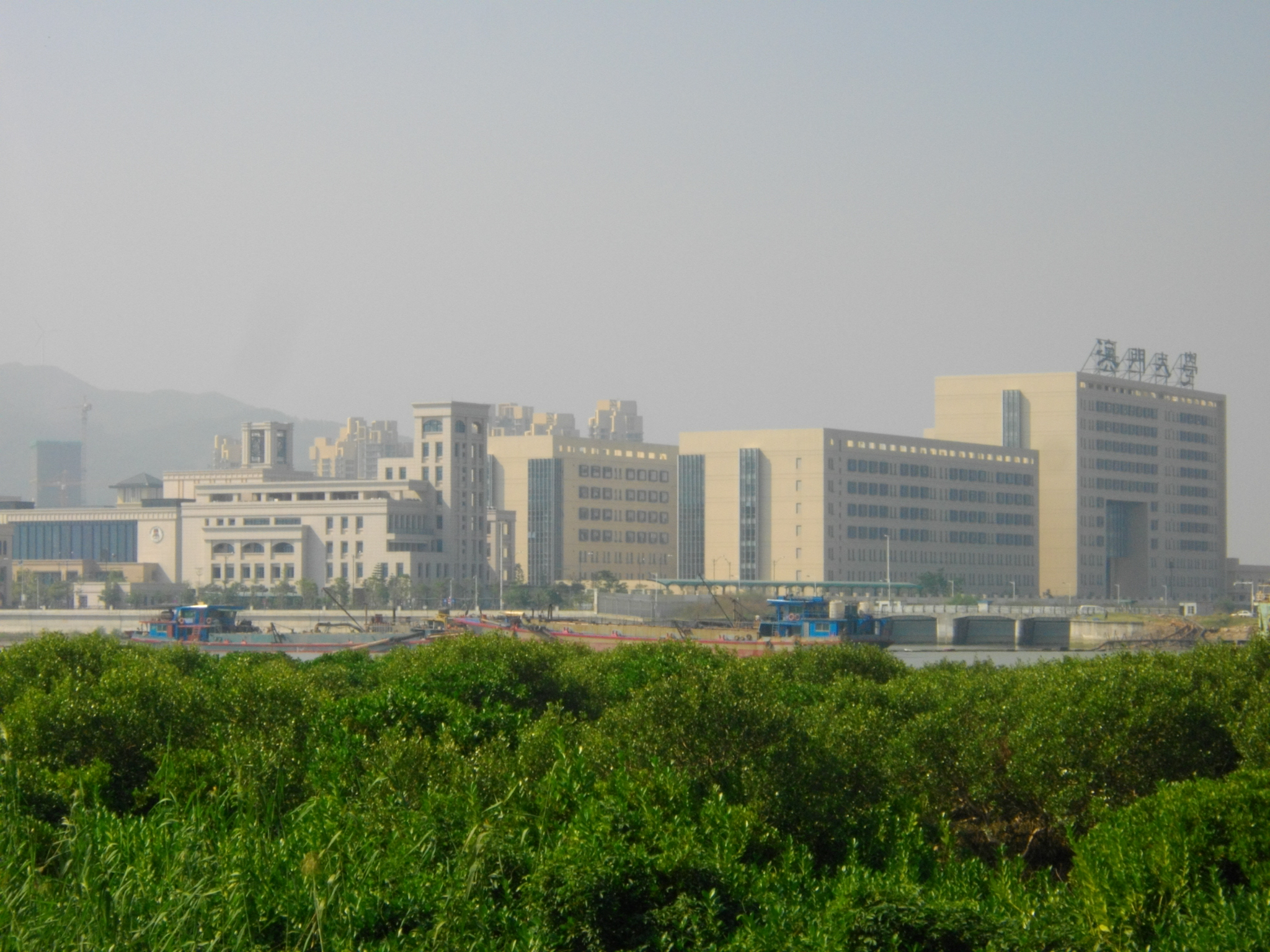
University of Macau

There are more than ten higher-learning institutions in Macau. Some students choose to further their studies in the local universities or polytechnics whereas some others choose to further their studies in mainland Portugal, mainland China, Taiwan, Hong Kong, the United Kingdom, the United States, Canada, Australia, Malaysia or some other places.

== International schools ==
A number of international schools operate in Macau, such as the School of the Nations, Macau Anglican College and International School of Macao.

== See also ==
- Education in the People's Republic of China
- Education by country
