= Giovanni Ricci =

Giovanni Ricci may refer to:

- Giovanni Ricci (American football)
- Giovanni Ricci (bishop) (1498–1574), Italian Roman Catholic bishop and cardinal
- Giovanni Ricci (politician) (1814-1892), Italian government minister
- Giovanni Ricci (mathematician) (1904–1973), Italian mathematician
- Giovanni Battista Ricci (c. 1537–1627), Italian painter
