= Mong-Há Fort =

Portuguese fortification in Macau

Coordinates: 22°12′28.7″N 113°32′51.3″E

Chinese name
- Traditional Chinese: 望廈炮台
- Simplified Chinese: 望厦炮台
Transcriptions
Standard Mandarin
- Hanyu Pinyin: Wàngxià Pàotái
- Wade–Giles: Wang^{4}-hsia^{4} Pʻao^{4}-tʻai^{2}
Yue: Cantonese
- Jyutping: mong6 haa6 paau3 toi4

Portuguese name
- Portuguese: Fortaleza de Mong-Há

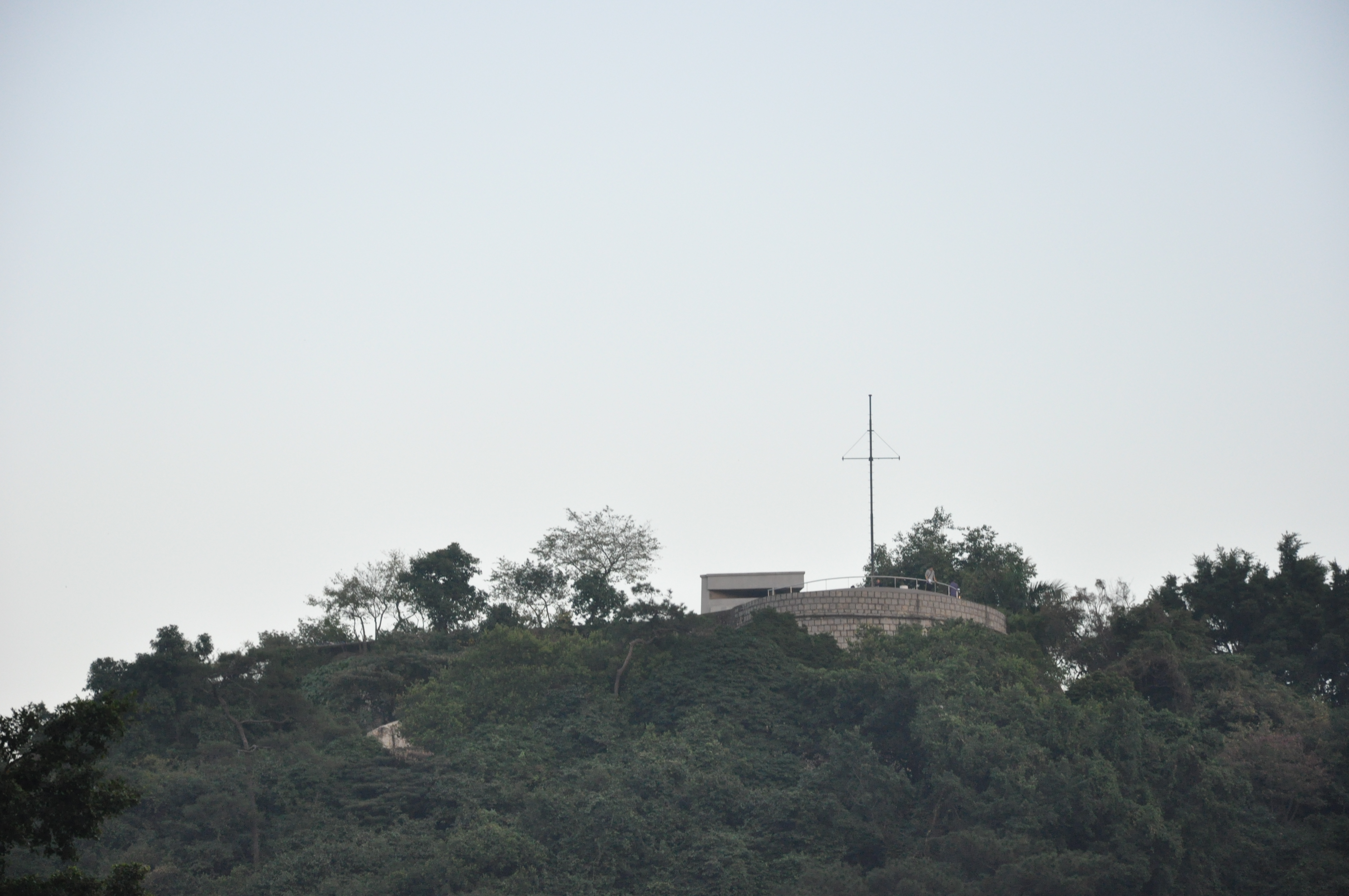
Mong-Há Fort

Mong-Há Fort (Chinese: 望廈炮台; Portuguese: Fortaleza de Mong-Há) is a fort on Mong-Há Hill, Nossa Senhora de Fátima, Macau, China. The fort is part of a greater military reservation – the Bairro Militar de Mong-Há, which included the Quartel de Mong-Há (Mong-Há Barracks). The Bairro Militar is bound by the Rua Francisco Xavier Pereira and the Colina de Mong-Há. The main fort complex was erected 1849 by Governor Ferreira do Amaral to protect the Macau's northern sector as precaution against a possible Chinese invasion following the First Opium War between Britain and China (1839–1842).

The fort's construction began in 1849 and was completed in 1864/66. The Quartel de Mong-Há was constructed in the 1920s. With the complete withdrawal of the Portuguese military establishment in the 1960s following the Sino-Portuguese rapprochement, the fort and the Bairro Militar were deactivated, with the former being turned over to the Instituto de Formação Turística de Macau in the 1980s. In June 1997, the area surrounding the fort was transformed into the Jardim Municipal de Mong-Há.

With an overall area of 650 square meters, the brick-walled fort held ten artillery pieces with a firing range capable of reaching the Portas do Cerco. Along with the barracks for Portuguese troops of African origin (Landins), the fort also included a lookout post and a munitions dump. The Quartel de Mong-Há occupied an area of 2244 square meters and was built in the style of 1920s Southern European and Modernist architecture. The government of Macau demolished the Quartel de Mong-Há and the neighboring Escola Keang Peng and put in their place public housing in the name of public security in late 2008.

== See also ==
- List of oldest buildings and structures in Macau
