= Kao Yip Middle School =

Private school in Macau, China

Kao Yip Middle School (Macau)
- 教業中學(澳門); Escola Kao Yip
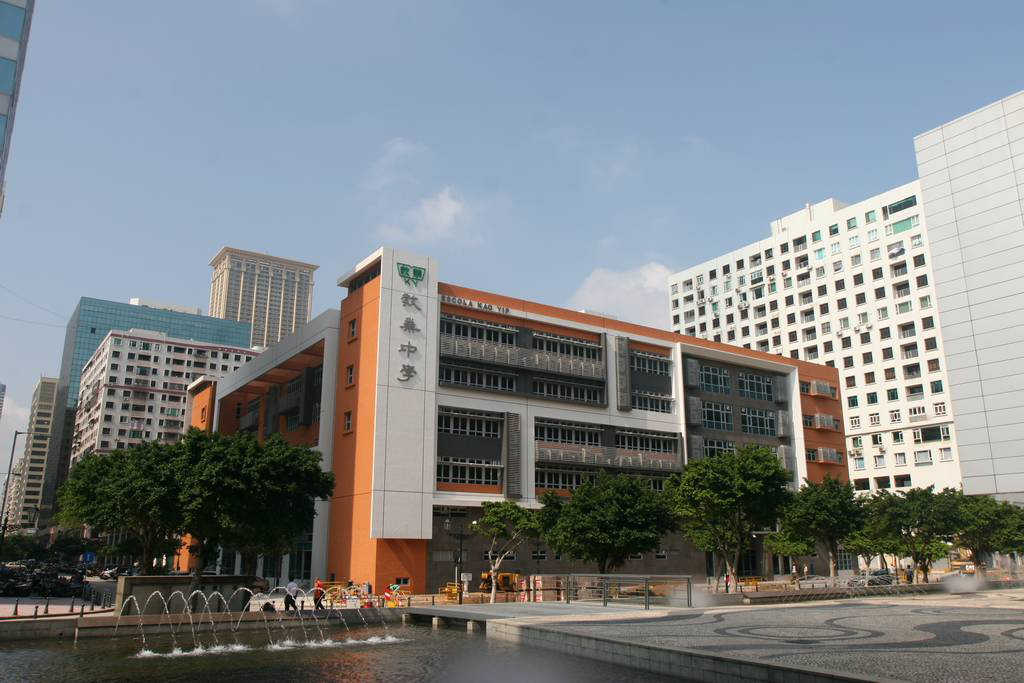
- Kao Yip Middle School in Novos Aterros do Porto Exterior (NAPE)

Location
- 81–87 Avenida Xian Xing Hai, Macau; Macau; 22°11′21.7″N 113°33′13.196″E

Information
- Type: Private School
- Motto: Loyalty, Solidarity, Abidance, Diligence, Innovation, Courtesy
- Established: 1910
- Superintendent: Wan Kuan Lok(尹君樂)
- Principal: Ho Shing(賀誠)
- Faculty: 100+
- Grades: Pre.K – F.6
- Enrollment: 3000+
- Language: Chinese, English
- Colours: Green and white
- Website: http://www.kaoyip.edu.mo/

Kao Yip Middle School

Chinese name
- Traditional Chinese: 教業中學
- Simplified Chinese: 教业中学
Transcriptions
Standard Mandarin
- Hanyu Pinyin: Jiàoyè Zhōngxué
Yue: Cantonese
- Jyutping: gaau3 jip6 zung1 hok6

Portuguese name
- Portuguese: Escola Kao Yip

Kao Yip Middle School (Chinese: 教業中學; Portuguese: Escola Kao Yip) is a preschool through secondary school in Sé (Cathedral Parish), Macau. It was founded in 1910 and merged with the Confucianism Middle School and Silver Leaves Primary School in 1975. Kao Yip Middle School is the only school in Macau with Confucianism as a principle.

In May 2018, it received approval to participate in the IB Diploma Programme and began enrolling students in the programme in 2019. It is one of only three schools in Macau that are IB schools.

== See also ==
- Education in Macau
- List of secondary schools in Macau

== Sources ==
- http://www.kaoyip.edu.mo/
- http://www.kaoyip.edu.mo/#/single-article/568f5f0c3c1053ad3200000e
- https://www.macaucentral.com/education/208-2009-03-05-21-32-30
