= List of Chinese provincial-level divisions by education attainment =

This is a list of first level administrative divisions of the People's Republic of China, in order of their attainment rate for basic, secondary, and tertiary education amongst people aged 25 and above. The list below refers to highest educational level attended. Data for all provinces of mainland China come from the 2020 Chinese census, whereas data for Hong Kong and Macao are collected from the 2021 census of each of the two SARs.

== List ==
Name	Total Population	Basic Education		Upper Secondary Education		Tertiary Education	
Name	Total Population	#	%	#	%	#	%
Mainland China	1,008,768,971	730,350,162	72.40%	320,483,811	31.77%	162,631,830	16.12%
Beijing	17,317,529	15,852,910	91.54%	11,319,563	65.36%	7,945,529	45.88%
Tianjin	10,547,990	8,943,016	84.78%	4,989,020	47.30%	2,919,682	27.68%
Hebei	52,557,835	40,078,105	76.26%	14,441,292	27.48%	6,910,080	13.15%
Shanxi	25,518,125	20,726,021	81.22%	8,765,192	34.35%	4,485,651	17.58%
Inner Mongolia	18,602,473	13,618,615	73.21%	6,357,978	34.18%	3,522,379	18.94%
Liaoning	34,319,587	27,933,392	81.39%	11,323,308	32.99%	6,176,280	18.00%
Jilin	19,180,140	14,757,969	76.94%	6,500,336	33.89%	3,074,797	16.03%
Heilongjiang	25,767,420	19,809,437	76.88%	7,631,106	29.62%	3,557,210	13.81%
Shanghai	20,210,259	17,727,580	87.72%	11,347,136	56.15%	7,205,029	35.65%
Jiangsu	64,348,103	48,209,889	74.92%	23,529,192	36.57%	12,295,409	19.11%
Zhejiang	49,387,631	33,797,638	68.43%	15,513,207	31.41%	8,437,051	17.08%
Anhui	43,062,141	28,582,900	66.38%	11,412,468	26.50%	5,732,767	13.31%
Fujian	29,463,402	19,982,099	67.82%	8,767,547	29.76%	4,398,867	14.93%
Jiangxi	29,615,292	20,651,203	69.73%	7,925,190	26.76%	3,416,651	11.54%
Shandong	72,772,468	52,776,759	72.52%	21,892,328	30.08%	10,840,513	14.90%
Henan	65,159,102	48,750,442	74.82%	18,614,178	28.57%	8,114,980	12.45%
Hubei	43,208,085	32,124,474	74.35%	14,638,165	33.88%	6,449,091	14.93%
Hunan	46,554,084	34,332,922	73.75%	14,398,036	30.93%	5,597,522	12.02%
Guangdong	86,527,831	68,960,653	79.70%	32,454,453	37.51%	15,192,789	17.56%
Guangxi	32,628,667	22,900,555	70.19%	8,132,120	24.92%	3,791,449	11.62%
Hainan	6,920,719	5,583,384	80.68%	2,231,896	32.25%	1,053,142	15.22%
Chongqing	23,308,493	15,283,897	65.57%	7,042,255	30.21%	3,447,045	14.79%
Sichuan	61,142,966	37,488,743	61.31%	15,546,774	25.43%	7,900,311	12.92%
Guizhou	24,207,710	13,540,826	55.94%	4,918,404	20.32%	2,878,774	11.89%
Yunnan	31,891,862	17,007,912	53.33%	6,690,522	20.98%	3,804,924	11.93%
Tibet	2,262,224	763,128	33.73%	422,936	18.70%	296,761	13.12%
Shaanxi	28,859,146	22,046,203	76.39%	10,378,757	35.96%	5,510,307	19.09%
Gansu	17,534,419	10,498,064	59.87%	4,992,874	28.47%	2,686,722	15.32%
Qinghai	3,969,270	2,165,073	54.55%	1,090,417	27.47%	677,734	17.07%
Ningxia	4,857,046	3,266,418	67.25%	1,593,952	32.82%	950,571	19.57%
Xinjiang	17,066,952	12,189,935	71.42%	5,623,209	32.95%	3,361,813	19.70%
Hong Kong	5,700,078	4,517,096	79.25%	3,517,749	61.71%	1,902,966	33.39%
Macao	418,160			234,735	56.14%	133,499	31.93%

== See also ==
- Education in China
- Education in Hong Kong
- Education in Macau
- Education in Taiwan
