= Escola Portuguesa de Luanda =

Location
- Rua N’Gola M’Bandi, nº 287 Caixa Postal 3109; Luanda; Angola
- 8°50′03″S 13°14′36″E

Information
- Other name: EPL
- Type: Portuguese international school
- Established: 1986; 40 years ago
- Authority: Portuguese Ministry of Education
- Grades: 1–12
- Language: Portuguese

Escola Portuguesa de Luanda (EPL) is a Portuguese-language international school in Luanda, Angola. It serves grades one through 12.

== History ==
Founded in 1986 with the authorization of the Portuguese Ministry of Education, the Portuguese School of Luanda obtained a definitive authorization from the Ministry of Education of Angola in 1993. Under the Decree-Law No. 183/2006 of September 2006. Under the Protocol signed between the Government of the Portuguese Republic and the Government of the Republic of Angola, the Portuguese School of Luanda will gain new premises while the school continues within the Portuguese Teaching Cooperative in Angola.

Created originally for the children of the Portuguese living in Angola, the Luanda Portuguese School has requested teachers from the Ministry of Education of Portugal and follows the programs and school calendar in force in Portugal. Considered to be the most prestigious non-university educational institution in Angola, the Portuguese School of Luanda has also opened its doors to Angolan students, particularly the children of Luanda's upper classes and leaders of the former Angolan independence movement.

Built with a capacity of 1,500 students, Luanda's Portuguese School provides pre-school, primary, secondary and tertiary education levels (1st, 2nd and 3rd cycles). In the academic year 2007/2008 it had eighty-one teachers and one thousand two hundred and six students. In 2009 the number of students reached the threshold of 2000 and in 2010 the maximum capacity was exceeded with 600 students waiting for a place to enter.

The Portuguese government has showed willingness to support the implementation of a second phase that would allow the increase of the capacity of the Portuguese School of Luanda to 3,000 students. However, to date this has not yet occurred. In 2026 the school will have a new director: Acácio de Brito, who was previously the director of the Portuguese School of Macau.
