= Escola Estrela do Mar =

- 海星中學

Location
- Rua do Padre António, n.º 36; São Lourenço, Macau; China

Information
- Type: Catholic School
- Motto: Jesus can.
- School number: 004, 005 (branch)
- Principal: Choi Chi U. EdD
- Grades: F.1 - F.6
- Colors: Red, white and blue.
- Religion: Roman Catholic
- Website: https://www.edm.edu.mo

Escola Estrela do Mar

Chinese name
- Traditional Chinese: 澳門海星中學
- Simplified Chinese: 澳门海星中学
Transcriptions
Standard Mandarin
- Hanyu Pinyin: Àomén Hǎixīng Zhōngxué
Yue: Cantonese
- Jyutping: ou3 mun4*2 hoi2 sing1 zung1 hok6

Portuguese name
- Portuguese: Escola Estrela do Mar

Escola Estrela do Mar (Chinese: 海星中學) or E.M is a Catholic preschool through secondary school in São Lourenço, Macau. The school has an annual event held on 8 December each year which commemorates the construction of the school. It is a member of the Macau Catholic Schools Association.

== See also ==
- Wah Yan College, Hong Kong
- Wah Yan College, Kowloon
- Colégio Mateus Ricci
