= Michael Bedard =

Canadian children's writer

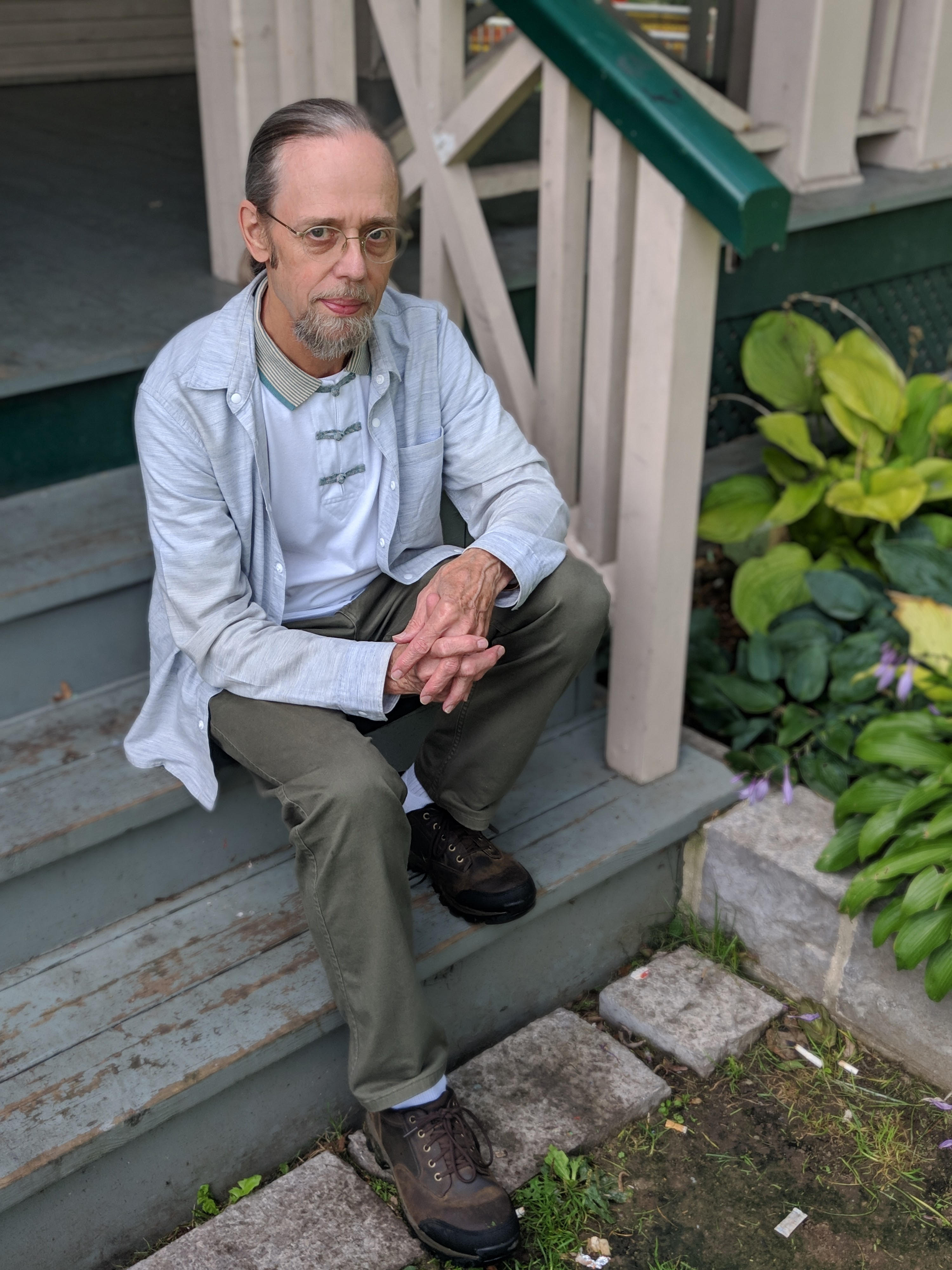
- Born: 26 June 1949 (age 77); Toronto, Ontario, Canada
- Education: University of Toronto
- Occupation: Writer
- Spouse: Martha Crean
- Children: 4
- Writing career
- Language: English
- Period: 1979–present
- Website: www.michaelbedard.ca

Michael Bedard (born June 26, 1949) is a Canadian children's writer. He was born and raised in Toronto, Ontario, Canada. He graduated from the University of Toronto in 1971 with a BA in philosophy and English. He began writing when his former high school teacher showed him works of Emily Dickinson and T. S. Eliot. Bedard currently lives in Toronto with his wife Martha. He has four children and six grandchildren.

== Works ==
- Woodsedge and Other Tales: A Gathering of Tales (Toronto: Gardenshore Press, 1979), stories
- Pipe and Pearls (Gardenshore, 1980), stories
- A Darker Magic (Atheneum, 1987)
- The Lightning Bolt, illustrated by Regolo Ricci (1989)
- Redwork (Atheneum, 1990)
- The Tinder Box, illus. Ricci (1990) – retelling Hans Christian Andersen's "The Tinderbox"
- The Nightingale, illus. Ricci (1991) – retelling Andersen's "The Nightingale"
- Emily, illus. Barbara Cooney (1992) – biographical fiction, featuring Emily Dickinson
- Painted Devil (Atheneum, 1994) – sequel to A Darker Magic
- Glass Town: The Secret World of the Brontë Children, illus. Laura Fernandez and Rick Jacobson (1997) – biographical, featuring the Brontë family
- The Divide, illus. Emily Arnold McCully (1997) – biographical, featuring Willa Cather
- The Clay Ladies, illus. Les Tait (1999)
- The Wolf of Gubbio, illus. Murray Kimber (Stoddart Kids, 2000) – "based on a legend of St. Francis of Assisi", OCLC 44019630
- Stained Glass (Tundra, 2001)
- The Painted Wall and Other Strange Tales: Selected and Adapted from the Liao-Chai of Pu Sung-ling (Tundra, 2003) – retelling of Liaozhai Zhiyi (Strange Stories from a Chinese Studio) by Pu Songling
- William Blake: The Gates of Paradise (2006) – biographical, featuring William Blake
- The Green Man (Tundra, 2012) – sequel to A Darker Magic

== A Darker Magic ==
Bedard's first novel, A Darker Magic (1987), is about an old teacher (Miss Potts) who discovers a handbill for a magic show which reminds her of the death of a friend from her childhood which she blames on the magic show. With the help of a student (Emily), they are able to prevent the show from happening. Dale Gale calls the work "rich in language and riveting in tone: it brims with a sense of foreboding that is sustained throughout" and a "well-crafted eerie novel that demands to be read again".

== Redwork ==
Bedard's second novel, Redwork (1990), won the Governor General's Literary Award, the Canadian Library Association Book of the Year for Children Award and the IODE Violet Downey Book Award. According to Margaret A. Chang, the novel "falls short of the high standard set by Margaret Mahy's Memory, the consummate tale of interaction between young and old". Another reviewer said that Bedard was "working on a new level" and that "everything is described in detail and every point is made through dialogue".

== The Painted Devil ==
The Painted Devil is a sequel to A Darker Magic, set in the same town of Caledon 28 years later. The story features Emily and her niece Alice.

== The Green Man ==
The Green Man is a sequel to A Darker Magic. The story follows Emily's niece, Ophelia, as she battles the next generation of the same dangerous magic her Aunt Emily faced as a child. The publisher blurbed, "At once an exploration of poetry, a story of family relationships, and an intriguing mystery, The Green Man is Michael Bedard at his finest."

== Awards and honors ==
Redwork

- Governor General's Literary Award, Canada, 1990
- Canadian Library Association Book of the Year Award for Children, 1991
- IODE Violet Downey Book Award, 1991

The Nightingale

- IODE Children's Book Award, 1991 (Bedard and Regolo Ricci)

The Clay Ladies

- IODE Children's Book Award, 1999 (Bedard and Les Tait)

The Green Man

- IODE Violet Downey Book Award, 2013
