= Badi Foundation =

The Badi Foundation (Chinese: 巴迪基金会) is a non-profit, non-governmental organization based in the Macao Special Administrative Region of the People's Republic of China. Its mission is to develop the capacity of individuals and institutions, through education and training programs, to contribute to the social and economic development of their communities.

Major programmatic areas of the foundation include formal education, early childhood education, institutional capacity building, and the moral empowerment of junior youth and youth.

The Badi Foundation is the parent body of the School of the Nations, a kindergarten through secondary school in Macao that takes an integrated approach to the moral and intellectual development of its students. Presently, the school serves over 600 students.

The foundation was established and registered as a non-profit charitable organization in Macao in 1990. From 1997 through 2018 it operated a representative office in Beijing that was registered under the State Administration for Industry and Commerce of the People’s Republic of China. During that time, through its Institutional Capacity Building Program, the foundation assisted individuals to establish community-based organizations in China’s rural and semi-rural regions and provided training and support to build the capacity of these organizations to serve the needs of their communities. From 2005-2017, over 40 organizations were established and reached over 56,000 rural women and youth with capacity building programs in mainland China.
