= Escola Secundária Luso-Chinesa de Luís Gonzaga Gomes =

Secondary school in Macau

- 高美士中葡中學
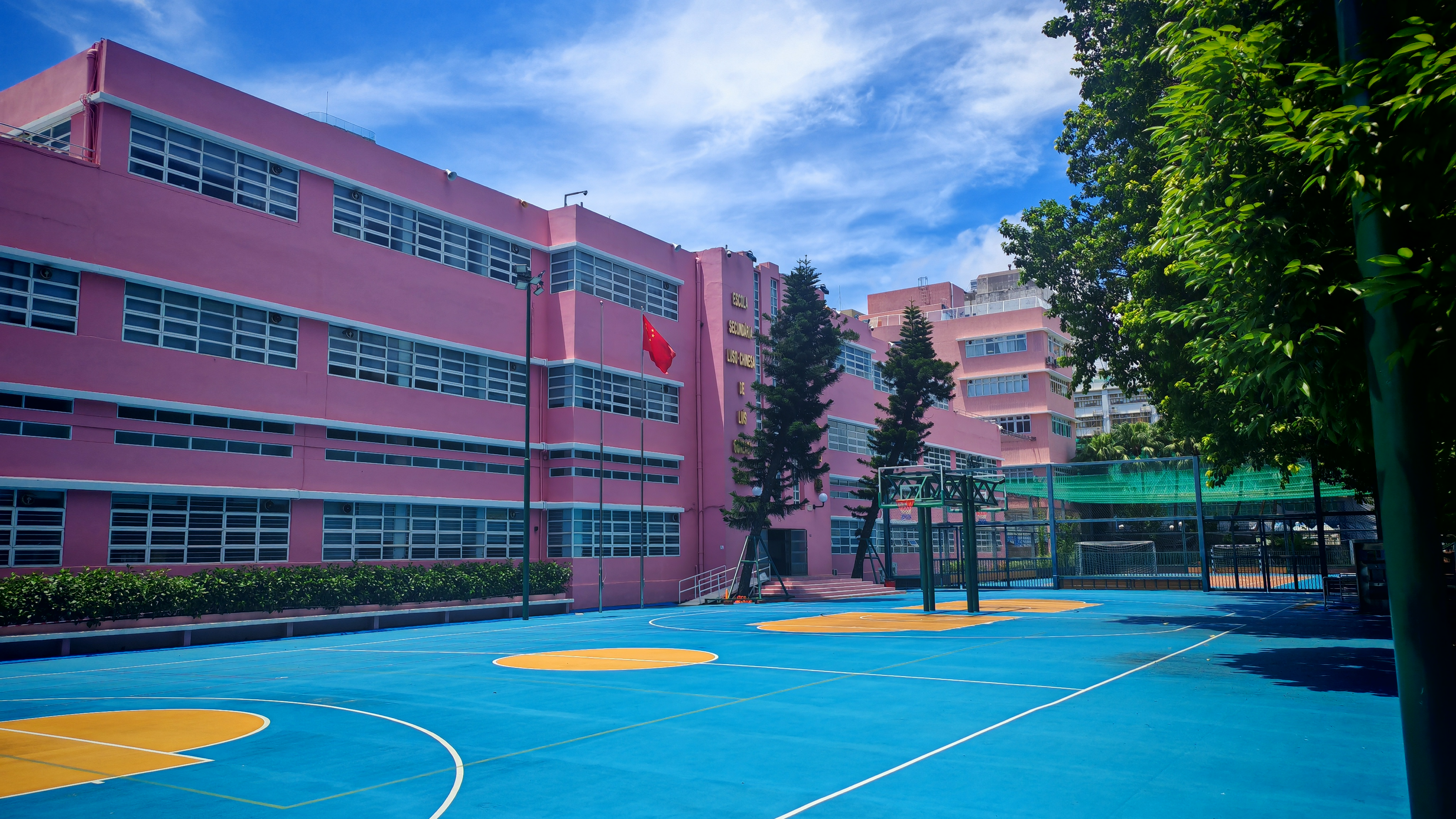

Location
- AV. SIDÓNIO PAIS, S/N 士多紐拜斯大馬路; Macau; 22.198057°N 113.54838300000006°E

Information
- Type: Secondary school
- Motto: 2020/2021 school year; English: Adversity shapes innovation, initiative learning makes mutual progress.; Portuguese: A adversidade estimula a inovacao, a colaboracao desperta o mutuo progresso.; Chinese: 敢創力行 逐理想
- Established: 1985
- Founder: Luís Gonzaga Gomes
- Status: Open
- Sister school: Jardim de Infância Luso-Chinês "Girassol"; Escola Primária Oficial Luso-Chinesa "Sir Robert Ho Tung"; Escola Escola Luso-Chinesa da Taipa; Escola Primária Luso-Chinesa do Bairro Norte; Escola Oficial Zheng Guanying; Escola Luso-Chinesa de Coloane; Escola Luso-Chinesa Técnico-Profissional; Huizhou Municipal Experimental High School; Escola Secundária Carlos Amarante
- School code: ESLCLGG
- Director: Wong Chang Chi
- Faculty: 80+
- Grades: 7–12 (Chinese section) Kindergarten–Year 9 (Portuguese section)
- Gender: Male and female
- Enrollment: 1000+ (4 campuses)
- Average class size: 20:1
- Language: Cantonese, Mandarin, Portuguese, English
- Campus type: Urban
- Colours: Blue and White
- Song: 揚帆
- Telephone: +85328331093
- Website: www.eslc.k12.edu.mo

Escola Secundária Luso-Chinesa de Luís Gonzaga Gomes
- Traditional Chinese: 高美士中葡中學
- Simplified Chinese: 高美士中葡中学
Transcriptions
Standard Mandarin
- Hanyu Pinyin: Gāoměishì Zhōng Pú Zhōngxué
Yue: Cantonese
- Jyutping: gou1 mei5 si6 zung1 pou4 zung1 hok6

Escola Secundária Luso-Chinesa de Luís Gonzaga Gomes (ESLCLGG Chinese: 高美士中葡中學) is a public secondary school in São Lázaro, Macau. Named after Luís Gonzaga Gomes, it was established in 1985.

The original site of the school was Macao Jiejie School (now Colegio Mateus Ricci). In 1986, it moved to the Macao School Complex (now the Macao Polytechnic University) and was named Escola Secundária e Preparatória Sino-Portuguesa de Luis Gonzaga Gomes. In 1989, the school was part of the elementary school. That same year, it was renamed Escola Secundaria Luso-Chinesa de Luis Gonzaga Gomes, providing regular grammar middle school courses from junior high to high school. To more effectively develop secondary education, the school moved to the current location of Avenida de Sidónio Pais, Macao, in 1995, and the school itself has continued to develop. In 2002, the school building expansion project began. Two new school buildings were built on both sides of the original main building and completed in 2003. To provide regular grammar secondary school courses for Macao school-age children, and to cultivate trilogy and four languages (Cantonese, Mandarin, Portuguese and English). The school is divided into sections for Chinese and Portuguese.

The school has four departments, which are:

- The Chinese Day School: The Chinese language is the main language of instruction, and the regular grammar combined junior high school and senior high school course of six years (Grade 7 to Grade 12).
- The Portuguese Day School: Opened in 1998, with Portuguese as the main language of instruction, providing regular grammar secondary school courses for junior high school students (Grade 7 to Grade 9).
- Secondary Adult Night School: Founded in 1999, it provides formal courses for junior high and high school, for adults who failed to complete secondary school in Macau. The unit system is the basis of the curriculum. Originally taught only at night, it opened in 2005.
- Portuguese Adult Night School: Opened in 1998, the Portuguese language is the main language of instruction, providing night junior high school and high school courses.

== History ==
In 1985, in order to continue the education of Sino-Portuguese primary and secondary schools, the former Portuguese Macau Government Education Department organized the first Sino-Portuguese Middle School; this is the predecessor of Escola Secundaria Luso Chinesa de Luis Gonzaga Gomes. At that time, the authorities rented the third floor of one of the teaching buildings of the St. Paul's Jiejie School. In the beginning, only four classes in the first grade of junior high school were opened. The number of students was 81, and the number of teachers was 12.

Starting in the 2022–2023 academic year, as part of the government's integration of the different government schools, students from the preschool and primary levels of the Portuguese section of the Escola Primária Luso-Chinesa da Flora were absorbed into the school, and the rest were integrated into the Escola Primária Oficial Luso-Chinesa "Sir Robert Ho Tung.

== Curriculum ==
ESLC is a Cantonese-medium school, and the Macau government uses ESLC to test adjustments to the Macau secondary school curriculum. While most Macau private schools have English classes as the primary foreign language instruction, ESLC instead has Portuguese as its main foreign language every weekq. Circa the 1990s/2000s, each student took six hours of Portuguese classes. It was the school in which a class on Macau history was introduced. In previous eras, the school used curriculum and materials from Hong Kong, as equivalent Macau-oriented products were not made at that time.

== Student body ==
Circa the 1990s/2000s, it had a higher percentage of recent immigrants from mainland China and low-income students compared to other Macau schools.

== Facilities ==
- Outdoor
  - Basketball Court
  - Multifunction Court
- Teaching Building A (KINDERGARTEN SECTION)
  - Classrooms
  - Multifunction Room
  - Toilets
  - Vending Machines
  - Band Room
  - Cafeteria
- Main Teaching Building
  - Classrooms
  - Meeting Rooms
  - Toilets
  - First Aids' Room
  - Small Auditorium
  - School's Office
  - Principal's Room
  - Music Room
  - Library
  - Art Room
- Teaching Building B (PRIMANY SECTION)
  - Classrooms
  - Toilets
  - Mini Multifunction Court
  - Computer Rooms
  - Laboratories

== School song ==
"揚帆"

== Houses ==
Upon entering ESLCLGG, new students are divided into four houses. The four houses competes every year in the schools activity called "Four Colors Activity" which happens two times in a year. The house with the highest overall score is the champion of the school year. Through this system, the competition encourages student excitement, achievement and greater enthusiasm and school spirit. There are four houses to which students and teachers are randomly assigned.

- Red
- Green
- Blue
- Orange
- Black(Principal and Vice Principals)

== Academic performance ==
Circa the 1990s/2000s about 50 percent of the students who graduated matriculated to post-secondary educational institutions.

== Summary of events ==
- 2019/2020 school year
  - Assistant Principal Mo Peiyu and Prof.Alda Jose Rocha of the Portuguese and Chinese Department retired.
- 2018/2019 school year
  - February: Portugal Escola Secundária Carlos Amarante School and the School of Sisters Under the needle of the Macao Education and Youth Affairs Bureau, the vice-chancellor of the school, Ms. Yang Yushi, and the coordinator of the Portuguese Department of the Day, Rovena Madeira, went to Portugal to attend the signing ceremony of the sister school on February 8, with Escola Secundária Carlos Amarante do Agrupamento de Escolas The Carlos Amarante School was established as a sister school.
  - The main school building finished its renovation.
- 2017/2018 school year
  - The school won its first overall championship in the Inter-school Jump Rope competition, defeating 20 other schools.
- 2016/2017 school year
  - 2017 Macau Open and United School Tchoukball Finals: In the men's joint school competition, the men's team A won the third place and the men's team B won the seventh place. In the women's joint school competition, the women's team A won the second place and the women's team B won the fourth place. In the women's open league, the women's team won the second place.
  - The main school building started its renovation.
- 2015/2016 school year
  - 2016 Macau Open and United School Tchoukball Finals: Both men's team A and women's team A respectively won second place.
  - April 14: Kuang Pengfeng won the championship of the 2016 Macau Open Badminton Championship, becoming the youngest champion in the history of the competition.
- 2014/2015 school year
  - February 25, 2015; 30th anniversary of the founding of the school
  - March 6: The school had its memorial party to celebrate its 30th anniversary of the founding of the school.
- 2013/2014 school year
  - The school choir achieved its first "Good" result in the Inter-school Choir competition prior to achieving "Fine" throughout the past years.
- 2012/2013 school year
  - Teacher Yu Peijun of the Chinese Department and Prof.Alice Esteves of the Portuguese Department retired in early 2013
- 2011/2012 school year
- 2010/2011 school year
  - Teacher Zhang Jiayi served as the training assistant coordinator
  - Teacher Chen Yinglun and Mr. Huang Yiheng respectively served as principals and vice principals of Escola Secundaria Luso Chinesa Tecnico Profissional.
- 2009/2010 school year
  - February 25, 2010; 25th anniversary of the founding of the school
  - The school won its first major victory in the Inter-school Soccer competition, defeating Pui Va Middle School.
- 2007/2008 school year
  - September 5, 2007: Beginning of the 07/08 school year
  - September 1, 2007: Repair of campus outdoor playground project begins
  - November 2007: Launched the "Napping Plan" to provide an afternoon nap for individual students in need
  - Mid-November 2007: The playground project was completed
  - February 29, 2008: The 100th Anniversary of Mr. Luis Gonzaga Gomes and the 2008 Cultural Day
- 2006/2007 school year
  - July 11, 2007: Mr. Luis Gonzaga Gomes's 100th birthday memorial mass
  - February 9, 2007: Cultural Day – Macau Food Culture
  - November 28, 2006: Awarded the "ICAN School Merit Award" by the Hong Kong Education for All
  - Cooperate with the Macao Health Bureau to implement the Healthy Campus Program
  - Implementing " Birth Education " in the second part of junior high school and junior high school
  - The ICAN Whole Person Education Program begins in the first year of junior high school and high school.
  - Launched the Campus Communityization Program at the school
- 2005/2006 school year
  - February 24, 2006: Cultural Day – Folk Traditional Games
  - February 6–10, 2006: Selection of individual students to participate in the "Flying Eagle Project"
  - October 1, 2005: Opening a day high school return to education course
  - September 2005 – January 2006: Comprehensive School Assessment
  - September 1, 2005: Beginning of the 2005/2006 school year, the implementation of the "Students Education" in individual classes, as well as the ICAN holistic education course in the weekly class teacher class in junior high school classes
- 2004/2005 school year
  - July 2005: The first high school graduation education graduation ceremony was held
  - June 29, 2005: Concluded into a sister school with Huizhou Experimental High School in Guangdong Province
  - March 1, 2005: Celebration of the 20th Anniversary of the Founding of the University
  - September 1, 2004: Training Auxiliary Group was established, Teacher Chen Yinglun was appointed as Training Coordinator; Teacher Yang Yushi was appointed as Academic Coordinator
- 2003/2004 school year
  - September 1, 2003: The establishment of the Prefect Group
  - March 27, 2004: Inauguration Ceremony and Open Day of the New Teaching Building, two new teaching buildings officially opened
- 2002/2003 school year
  - September 1, 2002: Change of school badge and new winter/summer uniform style
  - September 1, 2002: Changed from a five-year secondary school to a six-year secondary school
  - 2002: Opened a high school regression education course with Chinese as the medium of instruction, allowing people aged 18 or above to enroll
- 2001/2002 school year
  - 2002: Construction of the new campus building
- 2000/2001 school year
  - February 19, 2001: The first flag-raising ceremony was held
  - July 31, 2001: Vice President Huang Manyun officially left office
  - August 1, 2001: Teacher Chen Shuhui was appointed as Vice President
  - September 1, 2001: Teacher Mo Peiyu was appointed as assistant to the principal
- 1999/2000 school year
  - 1999: Escola Secundaria Luso Chinesa de Luis Gonzaga Gomes Prefect Group was established
- 1998/1999 school year
  - September 1, 1998: Escola Secundria Luso Chinesa Tecnico Profissional was opened, and night vocational training was taken over by the school.
  - September 1, 1998: Teacher Chen Shuhui was appointed as assistant to the principal
  - 1998: Escola Secundaria Luso Chinesa de Luis Gonzaga Gomes School Student Association established
  - 1999: According to the 1/SAAEJ/99 endorsement, a junior high school returning education course with Chinese as the medium of instruction is offered for those aged 18 or above.
- 1997/1998 school year
  - 1997: Due to the large number of students and the lack of application of school buildings, the first and second floor school buildings of the Escola Primaria Luso Chinesa da Flora were used for the first year of the first grade.
- 1996/1997 school year
  - 1996: Gradually implement the reform of the secondary school curriculum, from a five-year secondary school curriculum to a six-year secondary school curriculum
  - March 1, 1997: Teacher Liang Youcheng was appointed as the principal
  - May 11, 1997: Escola Secundaria Luso Chinesa de Luis Gonzaga Gomes Parents Association was established
  - September 1, 1997: Teacher Yu Peixian was officially appointed as Vice President
  - Opened night vocational courses
- 1995/1996 school year
  - Liang Li was appointed as Principal, Wong Man-yun and Leung Yu-ching as Vice-Chancellor
- 1994/1995 school year
  - Teacher Li Miaolan was appointed as Principal, Teacher Liu Weihong and Verónica Carvalho respectively as Vice President and Secretary
  - Moved to Avenida de Sidónio Pais (current location)
- 1990/1991 school year
  - The government issued a decree to cancel classes below secondary school. From this year onwards, the school will only have secondary education and will change its current name.
- 1989/1990 school year
  - According to Decree No. 62/89/M, Escola Secundária e Preparatória Sino-Portuguesa de Luis Gonzaga Gomes was renamed as Escola Secundaria Luso Chinesa de Luis Gonzaga Gomes and began to phase out the fifth and sixth grade courses.
- 1988/1989 school year
- 1987/1988 school year
  - Mr. Liang Li, a member of the School of Management, was appointed as the Chairman of the School Management Committee, Mr. Li Miaolan and Alda José Rocha as vice-chairman and Secretary of the School Management Committee respectively.
- 1986/1987 school year
  - According to the No. 129/86/M, the Sino-Portuguese secondary education curriculum was named Escola Secundária e Preparatória Sino-Portuguesa de Luis Gonzaga Gomes. In addition to the original Sino-Portuguese secondary education curriculum, it was also included in the fifth and sixth grades of Ho Tung Primary School.
  - According to Decree 38/86/M, Escola Preparatória e Secundária Luso Chinesa de Luìs Gonzaga Gomes, Escola Secundária do Infante D.Henrique and Goshua Preparatory Secondary School ( Escola Preparatória do Dr. José Gomes da Silva) jointly formed the "Macau School Complex" (the school is today at the Polytechnic Institute)
  - Mr. Pan Jialin, a member of the School Management Committee, Mr. Liang Li and Mr. Zhang Ziming were appointed as the Vice Chairman of the School Management Committee as the Secretary of the School Management Committee.
- 1985/1986 school year
  - September 1, 1985: Formally established, with secondary school and preparatory secondary education. According to the instructions No. 30/ect/85, the Sino-Portuguese secondary education curriculum will be opened, and the first year of the Sino-Portuguese Middle School Education Course (Grade 7) will be opened. The third classroom of the third floor of the Teaching Building of the Jiejie School(Now Colegio Mateus Ricci) will be temporarily borrowed.
