= Macao Conservatory =

- 澳門演藝學院; Conservatório de Macau
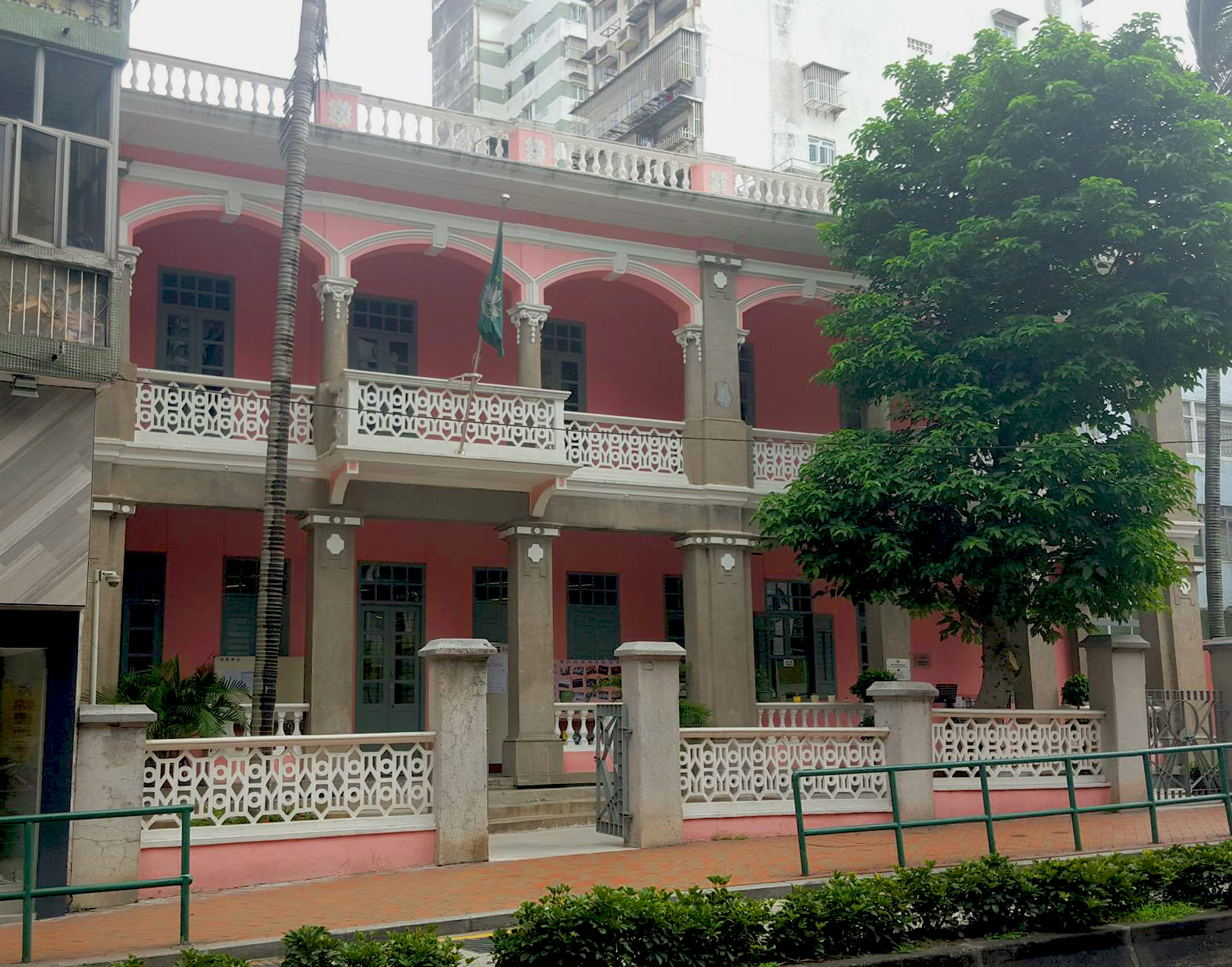
- Main building
- Head office: Avenida de Horta e Costa, n.^{os} 14-16; School of Dance: Alameda Dr. Carlos de Assumpção, n.^{os} 335-341, Edifício Centro Hotline, 3.º e 4.º andares School of Music: Rua do Volong, n.º 35, Macau; School of Theatre: Avenida da Amizade (Praceta de Miramar, n.º 87 r/c), Edifício Jardim San On, Macau; Macau

Information
- Type: Public School
- Website: cons.gov.mo

Macao Conservatory

Chinese name
- Traditional Chinese: 澳門演藝學院
- Simplified Chinese: 澳门演艺学院
Transcriptions
Standard Mandarin
- Hanyu Pinyin: Àomén Yǎnyì Xuéyuàn
Yue: Cantonese
- Jyutping: ou3 mun4*2 jin2 ngai6 hok6 jyun6*2

Portuguese name
- Portuguese: Conservatório de Macau

The Macao Conservatory (Chinese: 澳門演藝學院; Portuguese: Conservatório de Macau) is a public conservatory in Macau, a special administrative region of China.

The conservatory, which provides secondary education at the general (junior high school) level as well as technical and vocational upper secondary (senior high school/sixth-form college) instruction, has separate schools for music, dance, and theatre. The schools of music and dance are designated as public secondary school programmes by the Education and Youth Affairs Bureau. The conservatory headquarters and the school of music are in two separate facilities in São Lázaro; the school of music is adjacent to the Saint Lazarus Church. The schools of dance and theatre are in two separate facilities in Sé.

Campuses

== Note ==
- Some information originated from List of schools in Macau
