= School of the Nations (Macau) =

International school in Macau

- 澳門聯國學校; Escola das Nações
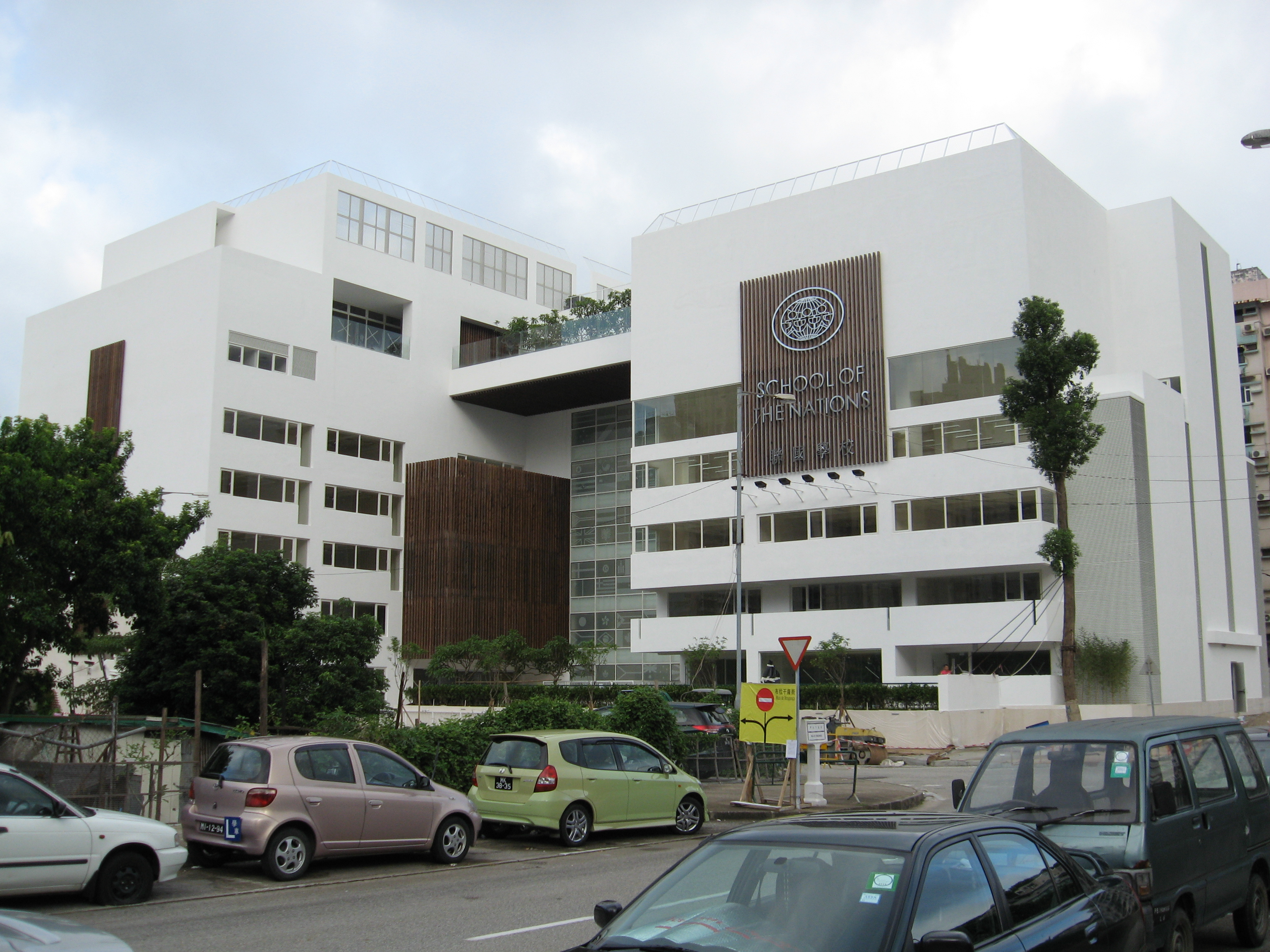
- School of the Nations, Macau SAR

Location
- Rua Do Minho, Taipa 米尼奧街; Macau
- Coordinates: 22.16002°N 113.55091700000003°E

Information
- Type: International School
- Established: 1988
- Administrator: Vivek V. Nair
- Staff: 100+
- Grades: K-12 school (Kindergarten to Form 6/Grade 12)
- Enrollment: ~600
- Language: English, Chinese
- Colour
- Website: www.schoolofthenations.edu.mo

School of the Nations

Chinese name
- Traditional Chinese: 聯國學校
- Simplified Chinese: 联国学校
Transcriptions
Standard Mandarin
- Hanyu Pinyin: Liánguó Xuéxiào
Yue: Cantonese
- Jyutping: lyun4 gwok3 hok6 haau6

Portuguese name
- Portuguese: Escola das Nações

The School of the Nations (Portuguese: Escola das Nações; Chinese: 聯國學校) is a Baháʼí-inspired school located in Taipa, Macau, owned by the Badi Foundation.

The School was founded in 1988 as a result of the efforts of a number of Macau residents and the Macau government. As an international school, it offers both expatriate and local families an internationally oriented, strong bilingual programme focusing on English and Mandarin Chinese.

The school currently has approximately 600-700 pupils, of whom about 70% are from Macau while the remaining 30% represent approximately 35 different nationalities. The parents of these expatriate students, for the most part, are in Macau for employment, working in Macau's private and public sectors.

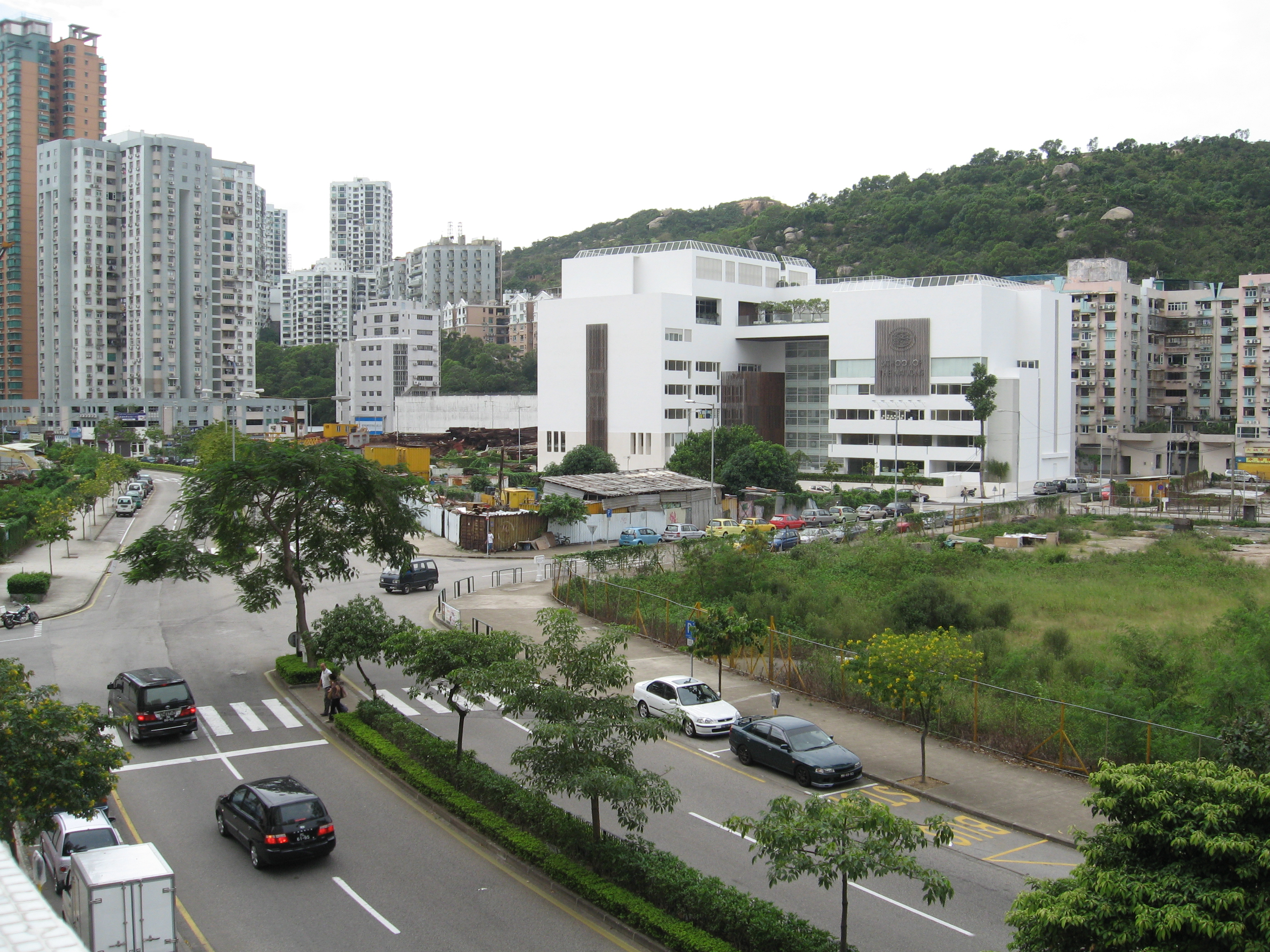
A very-wide-angle view of the school.

== History ==
The School of the Nations is an internationally oriented educational institution, licensed by the Government of Macau, as a non-profit organization.

=== Founding ===
It originally opened in 1988 with 5 students, all of whom were enrolled in kindergarten. It came about as a result of efforts from a number of Macau residents who saw the need in the community for an English medium school.

=== Early years ===
By the end of the 1989–1990 school year, the original premises in the Seng Vo building were filled to capacity. The demand for new enrollments however, continued to rise. It was decided to acquire additional property on the fourth floor of the Lei San building as an interim measure while a more permanent solution was sought. These premises were occupied for the school year 1990-1991 allowing the school to enroll approximately 200 students (a 100% increase over the preceding year).

A 35% increase for the academic year 1991-1992 and a 29% increase for the 1992–1993 school year brought the school to a critical condition of overcrowding. To accommodate the influx of new students, in 1994 the school began to lease commercial properties and convert them to classrooms.

=== Economic Recession ===
In 1997 all of Asia experienced a severe economic downturn, and enrollment to the school dropped. The decision was made to return all leased property, reduce overhead and limit enrollments to the number of students that could be accommodated in the properties belonging to the school. From that period until 2008, the school maintained a steady population of about 260 students.

=== Recent Developments ===
In 2008, construction of the School of the Nations building was completed. The building is located on Rua de Minho, on Taipa Island, not far from the Nova City residential complex. This new facility has greatly increased the school's capacity, allowing for a major increase in student capacity. Since then, the school has grown to approximately 600 students with around 100 staff.

== Facilities ==
As a result of Macau's limited amount of land, the school was initially located in rented properties within residential buildings. Normal classes were held in modified apartments. Physical education and other outdoor activities were carried out in the nearby facilities of a government school as well as public facilities where the School had access to basketball and mini-soccer courts and swimming pools, while space in the Macau Cultural Center was used for school gatherings.

In 2006, Macau's Education Department gave the school a grant of 2,500 square metres (27,000 sq ft) of land on Taipa Island, as well as substantial financial support for the construction of the new campus. The present school building is located on these grounds.

The current school campus spans 7 floors.

- The ground floor is home to the school's library and some kindergarten classrooms.
- The 1st floor is home to the cafeteria and more kindergarten classrooms.
- The 2nd floor consists entirely of primary school classrooms.
- The 3rd floor consists of middle school classrooms, one science laboratory, and the school's arts wing (two art classrooms, a drama studio, and a music classroom).
- The 4th floor consists of secondary school classrooms, an upperclassmen lounge, two science laboratories, as well as the school auditorium.
- The 5th floor houses the school's gymnasium,
- The 6th and 7th floors (Roof and Upper Roof) are outdoor activity areas used for sports and recreational activities.

== Curriculum ==
Character development, the development of the spirit of social service and cooperation as well as environmental awareness, is a strong theme in the educational program of SON. Despite retaining a 2-section naming system ("Primary" and "Form" a.k.a. Secondary) the school uses a 3-section system to divide its grades internally - primary school, middle school and high school. This is in order to cater to the different needs of students in each grade better.

The school's current standard curriculum for the lower grades (Primary 1 up to Form 2 a.k.a. Grade 8) consists of:

- English
- Mandarin
- English Literature
- History
- Computer Science
- Geography
- Combined Science (integrating Biology, Chemistry and Physics)
- Mathematics
- Physical Education
- Art
- Drama

The character training program was awarded first prize in 1997 for innovation in curriculum by the Department of Education and Youth Services of Macau. It was also awarded 3rd prize by the International Schools Services in their worldwide competition for community service programs.

=== IGCSE Program ===
The International General Certificate of Secondary Education (IGCSE) is an English language curriculum offered to secondary students to prepare them for the International Baccalaureate, A Level and BTEC Level 3 curriculums. It is based on the older GCE O-Level and is recognized internationally as being equivalent to the British GCSE.

Students begin studying for the IGCSEs in Form 3 (Grade 9) and generally take the examinations at the end of the school year in Form 4 (Grade 10); however, high-achieving students in the English and Mathematics courses are permitted to take the examinations in said courses one year early (at the end of Form 3/Grade 9). School of the Nations currently offers courses in the following subjects for the IGCSE Exams:

- Biology (0610)
- Physics (0625)
- Chemistry (0620)
- English - First Language (0500)
- English - Literature (0486)
- First Language Chinese (0509)
- Computer Science (0478)
- Mathematics (0580)
- Additional Mathematics (0606)
- Global Perspectives (0457)
- Drama (0411)
- Art (0400)
- Music (0410)

The School of the Nations is currently the only school to offer the Drama IGCSE course in Macau. When starting the IGCSE program in Form 3, students choose to study either Art, Music, or Drama as their arts subject.

The average grade achieved by a secondary student studying in the IGCSE program in SON is an A; most students achieve several A/A* grades.

=== IB Diploma Program ===
The International Baccalaureate Diploma Programme (IBDP) is a two-year educational programme primarily aimed at students aged 16–19. It is taken by all students starting from Form 5 (Grade 11) and ending in Form 6 (Grade 12) with the examinations.

The School of the Nations is currently one of only two schools in Macau to offer the IB Diploma Program as a part of its curriculum (the other being The International School of Macau). The School of the Nations offers the following subjects for the IB Diploma Program (further subjects are also available for online study through Pamoja; those are not included in the list below):

Group 1 - Studies in Language and Literature

- English Language & Literature HL/SL

Group 2 - Language Acquisition

- Chinese B HL/SL
- Mandarin Ab Initio SL

Group 3 - Individuals and Societies

- Business Management HL/SL
- Psychology HL/SL
- Economics HL/SL

Group 4 - Experimental Sciences

- Chemistry HL/SL
- Biology HL/SL
- Physics HL/SL
- Environmental Systems and Societies SL

Group 5 - Mathematics

- Mathematics AA HL/SL

Group 6 - The Arts

- Visual Arts HL/SL
- Music HL/SL

Students in the IBDP also have to write an Extended Essay not longer than 4000 words in a subject of their choice and complete CAS (Creativity, Activity, Service) experiences as a part of the program.

== Scholarships ==
The school offers a scholarship to students who are in financial need and who have consistently and diligently demonstrated high academic merit. Scholarship recipients must also be noted for their cooperative behaviour, friendliness, helpfulness, respect for teachers and fellow students, and obedience to school rules. The scholarship is funded through ongoing fundraising efforts within the school.
