= Elisa Ricci =

Italian computer scientist

Elisa Ricci is an Italian computer scientist, a full professor in the Department of Information Engineering and Computer Science at the University of Trento, and head of the Deep Visual Learning group at the Fondazione Bruno Kessler in Trento, Italy. Her research applies deep learning to computer vision problems including medical imaging and motion analysis.

== Education and career ==
After secondary schooling at the Liceo classico statale Jacopone da Todi in Todi, Ricci received a laurea (then the Italian equivalent of a master's degree) and engineering accreditation from the University of Perugia in 2004. She continued her studies at the University of Perugia, completing her doctorate there in 2008.

After postdoctoral research at the Idiap Research Institute in Switzerland and at the Fondazione Bruno Kessler, she became a researcher and assistant professor at the University of Perugia from 2011 to 2017, and concurrently a researcher for the Fondazione Bruno Kessler from 2013 to 2016. She joined the Department of Information Engineering and Computer Science at the University of Trento in 2017, and became head of the Deep Visual Learning group at the Fondazione Bruno Kessler in 2020.

== Recognition ==
Ricci was named as a Fellow of the International Association for Pattern Recognition in 2024, "for contributions to multimodal human behaviour analysis and adaptation methods for visual recognition models".
