= Macau Portuguese School =

Private school in Macau

- Escola Portuguesa de Macau; 澳門葡文學校
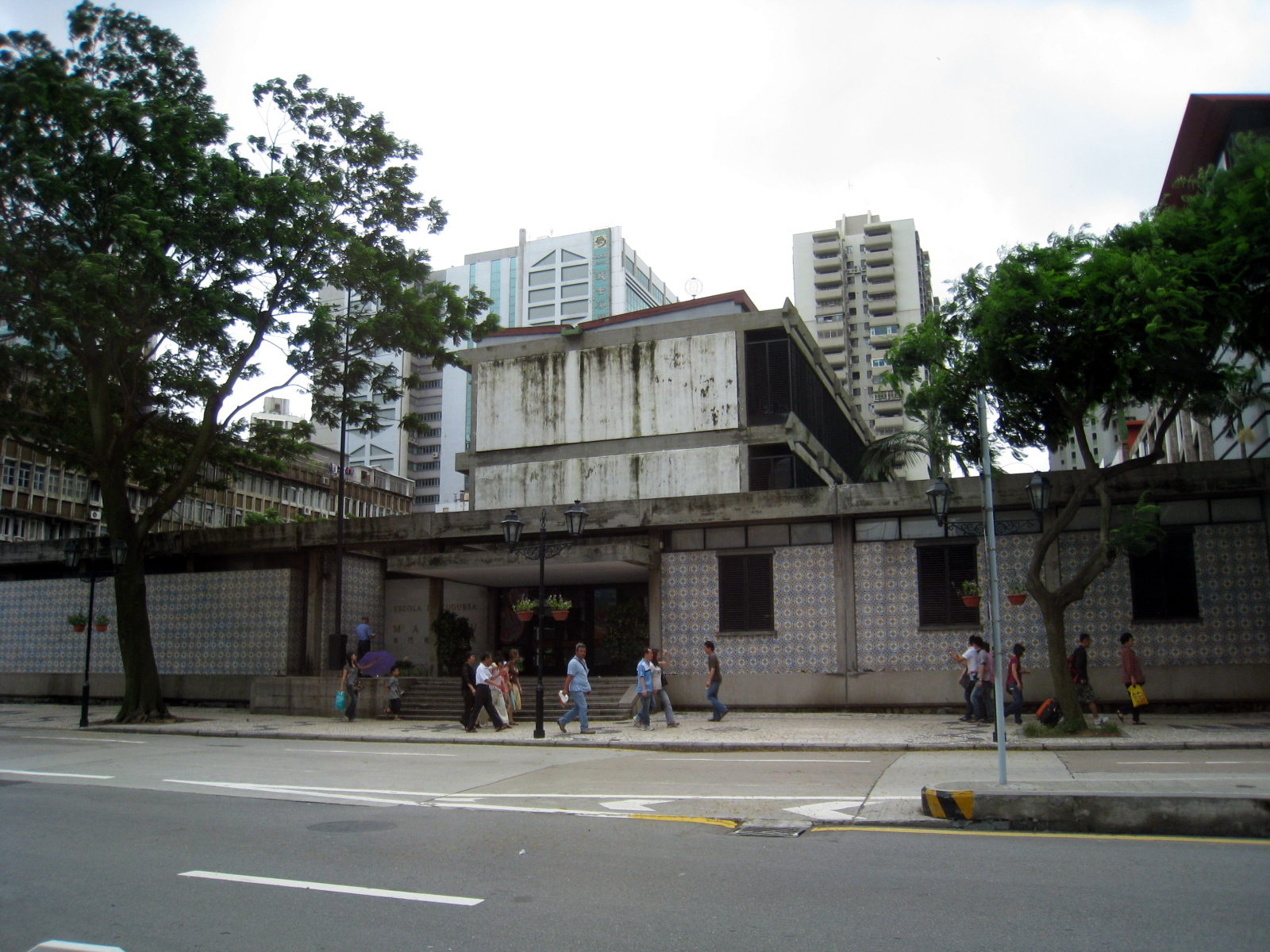
- The school's premises on Avenida do Infante D. Henrique

Location
- Sé, Macau, China; 22.191359°N 113.542391°E

Information
- Type: Private
- Established: 1998
- Enrollment: 1000
- Website: www.epmacau.edu.mo

Macau Portuguese School

Chinese name
- Traditional Chinese: 澳門葡文學校
- Simplified Chinese: 澳门葡文学校
Transcriptions
Standard Mandarin
- Hanyu Pinyin: Àomén Púwén Xuéxiào
Yue: Cantonese
- Jyutping: ou3 mun4*2 pou4 man4*2 hok6 haau6

Portuguese name
- Portuguese: Escola Portuguesa de Macau

The Macau Portuguese School (Portuguese: Escola Portuguesa de Macau, EPM, Chinese: 澳門葡文學校) is a semi-private, non-profit Portuguese school in Macau, China. It serves grades 1–12, and is located in Sé (Cathedral Parish). The school is operated by the Fundação Escola Portuguesa de Macau and receives partial funding from the Portuguese government. As of 2023, the school had 713 students of 20 nationalities.

== History ==
The former Liceu was a public institution, and the new EPM, a private school, was its continuation. The school occupies the former premises of the former Escola Comercial; circa 1998 this campus, smaller and less expensive to maintain than the former Liceu de Macau, only had enough space to house fewer than half of the students who wished to attend. Initially the school had over 1,100 students. Its administrators were scheduled to be from the local Macanese community, replacing the previous Portuguese leadership at the former Liceu.

Since its establishment the number of students had declined, attributed in part to the departure of many Portuguese families from Macau. Around 2012 this reversed and the student body count began to increase, along with an increasing number of students without a Portuguese-language background. As of 2018 the school had 577 students from 24 countries. In 2023, the school had 713 students, with non-Portuguese-native-language students exceeding 40% of the student population. In 2024 the school got a new director: Acácio de Brito where he tried to fire 12 teachers. Despite this, Acácio has made some improvements with the infrastructure in the school with new computers, renovating classrooms and a new cantine. In 2026 it was announced by the Minister of Education of Portugal Fernando Alexandre that Acácio would leave the school, to go to the Portuguese School of Luanda.

== Curriculum ==
The school provides education from the 1st to the 12th year of schooling, following the curricula defined by the Portuguese Ministry of Education, with the necessary adaptions for compliance with Macau legislation and the local context.

The medium of instruction of most classes is Portuguese.

In 2018 Valeria Koob, the president of the school's parent association, advocated for having outside-of-class expeditions for Mandarin Chinese classes.

== See also ==
- Education in Macau
