= Regolo Ricci =

Canadian artist working (born 1955)

Regolo Ricci (born 1955) is a Canadian artist working mainly in oils and watercolors. He was born in Italy and came to Canada as a young child. He is best known for his work as a children's book illustrator, and he was nominated for the Canada Council for the Arts Governor General's Award for Children's Book Illustration in 2000. As of 2006 he lived in Mississauga, Ontario.

Ricci and the writer Michael Bedard created picture book editions of literary fairy tales by Hans Christian Andersen, namely "The Nightingale" and "The Tinder Box" (1835 and 1843, Danish language). They won the annual IODE Ontario Children's Book Award (now Jean Thorp Award) for The Nightingale in 1991.

Ricci's earliest book listed in the WorldCat catalogue is The Lightning Bolt, another picture book written by Bedard, which was published by Oxford University Press in 1989.

The Market Wedding (2000), written by Cary Fagan, is "based on an old Yiddish tale". It was a runner-up for the Sydney Taylor Book Award and Ricci was one of five nominees for the Governor General's Award in children's literature illustration that year.

== Selected works ==
- The Lightning Bolt (Toronto: Oxford University Press, 1989), picture book written by Michael Bedard, OCLC 19390065
- The Tinder Box (OUP, 1990), adapted by Bedard from Hans Christian Andersen, OCLC 738689715
- The Nightingale (OUP, 1991), by Bedard from Andersen, OCLC 850321131
- The Market Wedding (Tundra Books, 2000), by Cary Fagan; 2014 Groundwood Books edition, ISBN 978-1554986958
