= Macau Anglican College =

Private Christian school in Taipa, Macau

Coordinates: 22.1620°N 113.5596°E

- 聖公會中學; Colégio Anglicano de Macau
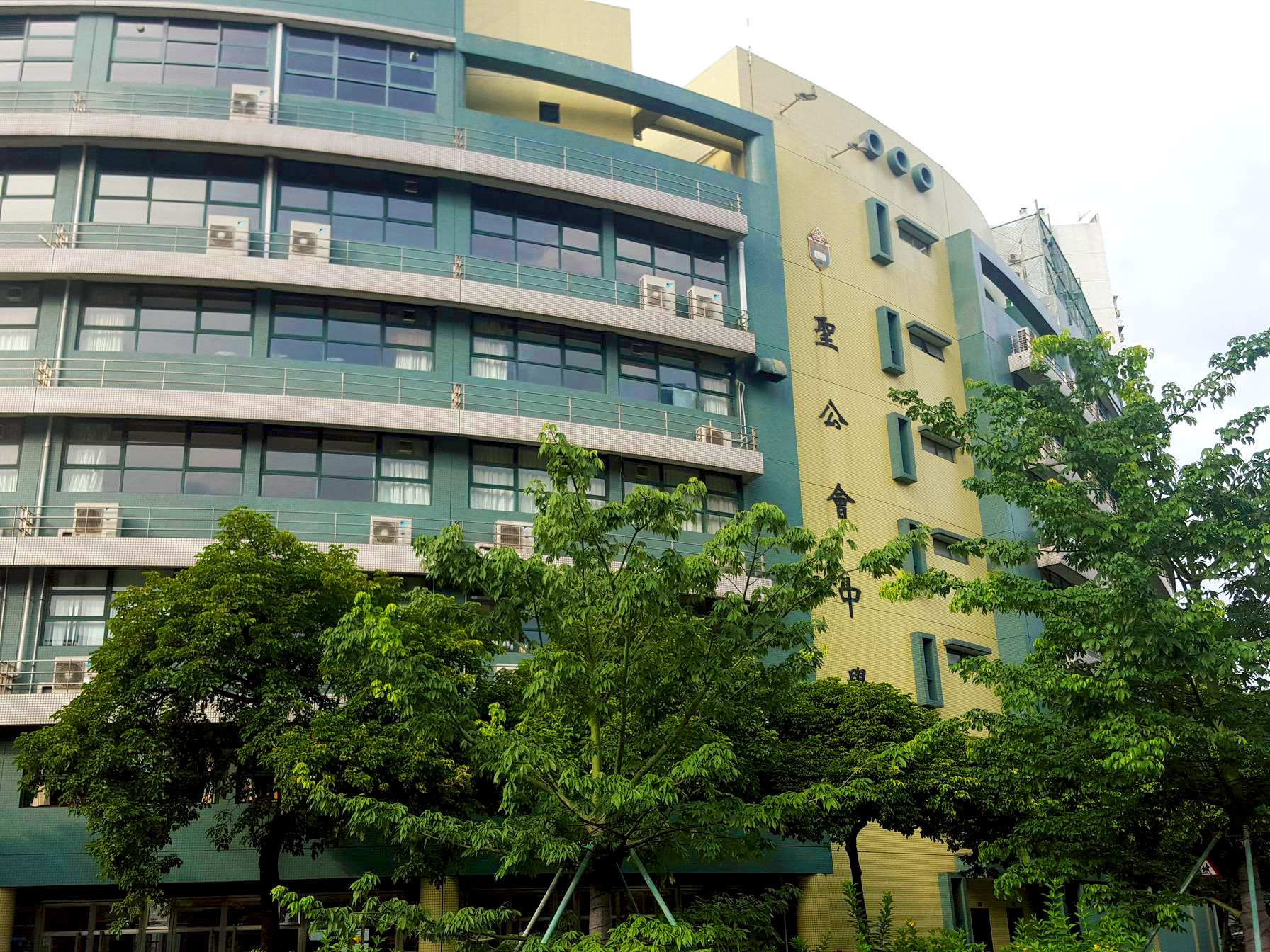
- Macau Anglican College

Location
- 109–117 Avenida Padre Tomas Pereira, Taipa; Macau

Information
- Other name: 澳門聖公會中學
- Motto: We work together to educate the whole child
- Established: 2002
- Principal: Robert Alexander
- Affiliation: Anglican Communion
- Website: www.acm.edu.mo

Macau Anglican College
- Traditional Chinese: 聖公會中學
- Simplified Chinese: 圣公会中学
Transcriptions
Standard Mandarin
- Hanyu Pinyin: Shènggōnghuì Zhōngxué
Yue: Cantonese
- Jyutping: sing3 gung1 wui6*2 zung1 hok6

Macau Anglican College (MAC; Chinese: 聖公會中學; Portuguese: Colégio Anglicano de Macau) is a private Christian school in Taipa, Macau. Macau Anglican College was established in 2002 and provides education from kindergarten to senior secondary. It is an Anglican Foundation College, meaning it receives professional advice and financial backing from the Anglican Church in Hong Kong.

The college employs a large number of Christian teachers from many Christian denominations. It works closely with the Education and Youth Affairs Bureau (DSEDJ) and students' parents who are represented by a Parent–School Association.

As of 2021, the school had 1460 students.

== History ==
It was formerly known in English as Sheng Kung Hui Primary School.

Macau Anglican College opened in 2002 as a "private and experimental school" with 145 pupils spanning five classes in total. It was founded by former principal David Brown along with other senior staff. The kindergarten and secondary sections are privately run and require parents to pay a fee, while the primary section is government-subsidized and free for Macau citizens and residents. In the secondary school, the entire course is not free and requires quite a bit of money, with teachers getting cheaper offers. Prices range from about 80,000 MOP to 100,000 MOP (10,000 USD to 12,750 USD)

Initially, the school only offered kindergarten and primary programs; in 2009, they began offering a secondary education curriculum. The first secondary graduation took place in 2014. The school offers students help with Cambridge (CIE) IGCSE and A-Level examinations.

In 2018, the school was closed for two days amid concerns about asbestos from a nearby building.

The COVID-19 pandemic caused problems for the school as foreign teachers were not allowed into Macau owing to border restrictions. According to principal Robert Alexander, this caused the school to hire more local teachers.

== Curriculum ==
Principal David Brown stated that in the beginning the school was called "experimental" for its style of curriculum and that this did not bother him.

The school aims to serve a variety of students using Individualized Education Plans.

Priority for placement in the secondary education program is given to the previous years' graduating MAC pupils. Secondary pupils may take the Cambridge (CIE) IGCSE Examinations in Form 4 and CIE A-Level Examinations in Form 6.

The main medium of instruction is English. Pupils learn two main languages – English and Chinese – and two optional – French and Portuguese. The average class size in the school is 26 pupils in primary. Class numbers fluctuate in secondary.

Lower secondary students must take compulsory subjects including ICT, Chinese, English, Science, and more. Upper secondary students have more freedom of choice in choosing which subjects they wish to study before; Chinese, English, Mathematics and Physical Education are compulsory due to local government requirements.

In 2011 the school introduced an Inclusive Education Unit, which caters to students with disabilities and other special needs.

== School activities ==
School activities include class assemblies, theatrical productions during events such as Christmas and the Chinese New Year, charity work, field trips, graduation trips and barbecues, themed dress-up days and school parties during festivals/holidays. For secondary students, there is a chapel period every other Wednesday. Pupils were also offered a variety of extra-curricular activities, and after-school care is provided for children in case it is necessitated by their parents' schedules. Due to new requirements from the local government, after school (or "co-curricular") activities are compulsory for secondary students also.

In 2023 it was announced that MAC would become the first testing center in Macau for the Camões Júnior Portuguese language test (run by the Instituto Camões).

=== Athletics ===
MAC's boys' association football team has won the Group A finals three years in a row between 2022 to 2025. In 2023, the third year, the team defeated the International School of Macao 1–0 in the finals.

== School facilities ==
The school is situated on the island of Taipa, down the road from the IFT. The campus features two large playgrounds, one on the ground floor and one on the roof. The roof playground is also intended for sports activities. Facilities on-campus include two libraries, computer suites, two music rooms, art rooms and science labs. Kindergarten classrooms feature outdoor segments which are used as play and activity areas for the children.

The school was designed by the architect Jose F. Pereira Chan. He says that it was the mission of the school that inspired him to look at "the creation of Adam", the fresco painted by Michelangelo at the Sistine Chapel's ceiling. The hand detail in the drawing reflects the concept of God communicating himself to humanity, hence the finger was adopted as the design concept for the school.
