= Giovanni Ricci (mathematician) =

Italian mathematician (1904-1973)

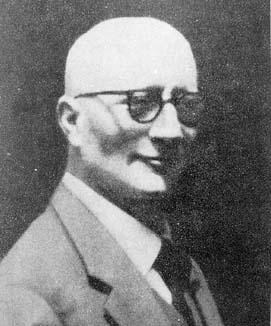
- Undated photograph
- Born: 17 August 1904; Florence, Italy
- Died: 9 September 1973 (aged 69); Milan, Italy
- Education: Scuola Normale Superiore
- Scientific career
- Workplaces: Scuola Normale Superiore; University of Milan

Giovanni Ricci (17 August 1904 – 9 September 1973) was an Italian mathematician.

He was born and brought up in Florence, where he did his school education. He then moved to Pisa to study mathematics at the Scuola Normale Superiore (associated with the University of Pisa). He was an assistant professor at the University of Rome for two years until 1928 when he moved to his alma mater Scuola Normale Superiore, where he was a professor for 8 years and produced research works in the fields of number theory, differential geometry, mathematical analysis, and theory of series, with highly significant results being obtained on the Goldbach conjecture and Hilbert's seventh problem.

Ricci moved to the University of Milan towards the end of 1936, where he remained as a professor for 36 years until his death on 9 September 1973. While in Milan, Ricci was largely committed to teaching and administrative work and his research output declined.

Ricci served as the president of Italian Mathematical Union from 1964 to 1967. He was a member of the Accademia dei Lincei since 1957. He was also a member of Istituto Lombardo Accademia di Scienze e Lettere.

Ricci is noted to have had a significant influence on Fields Medal-winning mathematician Enrico Bombieri.
