= Giovanni Ricci (American football) =

American football player (born 1996)

Profile
- Position: Tight end

Personal information
- Born: October 16, 1996 (age 30); Loveland, Ohio, U.S.
- Listed height: 6 ft 3 in (1.91 m)
- Listed weight: 240 lb (109 kg)

Career information
- High school: Loveland
- College: Western Michigan (2015–2019)
- NFL draft: 2020: undrafted

Career history
- Carolina Panthers (2020–2023); Cleveland Browns (2024)*; New England Patriots (2025)*; Minnesota Vikings (2025)*; Detroit Lions (2025)
- * Offseason or practice squad member only

Awards and highlights
- First-team All-MAC (2019); Third-team All-MAC (2018)

Career NFL statistics as of 2025
- Receptions: 9
- Receiving yards: 102
- Stats at Pro Football Reference

Giovanni Ricci (born October 16, 1996) is an American professional football tight end. He played college football for the Western Michigan Broncos.

== College career ==
Ricci played for the Western Michigan Broncos for five seasons, redshirting his true freshman year. He finished his collegiate career with 98 catches for 1,114 yards and 11 touchdowns.

== Professional career ==
Pre-draft measurables
| Height | Weight | Arm length | Hand span |
|---|---|---|---|
| 6 ft 3 1/8 in (1.91 m) | 234 lb (106 kg) | 31 3/8 in (0.80 m) | 9 1/8 in (0.23 m) |
All values from Pro Day

=== Carolina Panthers ===
Ricci was signed by the Carolina Panthers as an undrafted free agent on April 30, 2020. He was waived at the end of training camp. Ricci was re-signed to the Panthers' practice squad shortly afterwards and remained there for the rest of the 2020 season. He was signed to a reserve/futures contract on January 4, 2021.

In 2022, Ricci appeared in 15 games (starting 3), and hauled in 8 receptions for 100 yards. On January 9, 2023, Ricci signed a futures/reserve contract with the Panthers.

On October 24, 2023, Ricci was placed on injured reserve with a shoulder injury.

=== Cleveland Browns ===
On March 15, 2024, Ricci signed with the Cleveland Browns. On August 22, Ricci contract was terminated due to an injury.

=== New England Patriots ===
On February 3, 2025, Ricci signed a reserve/futures contract with the New England Patriots. He was released on April 28, 2025.

=== Minnesota Vikings ===
On June 10, 2025, Ricci signed with the Minnesota Vikings as a tight end. He was released on August 26 as part of final roster cuts.

=== Detroit Lions ===
On December 1, 2025, Ricci signed with the Detroit Lions' practice squad.
