= Keang Peng School =

Private school in Macau

Coordinates: 22.20569°N 113.54996°E

Chinese name
- Traditional Chinese: 鏡平學校
- Simplified Chinese: 镜平学校
Transcriptions
Standard Mandarin
- Hanyu Pinyin: Jìngpíng Xuéxiào
Yue: Cantonese
- Jyutping: geng3 ping4 hok6 haau6

Portuguese name
- Portuguese: Escola Keang Peng

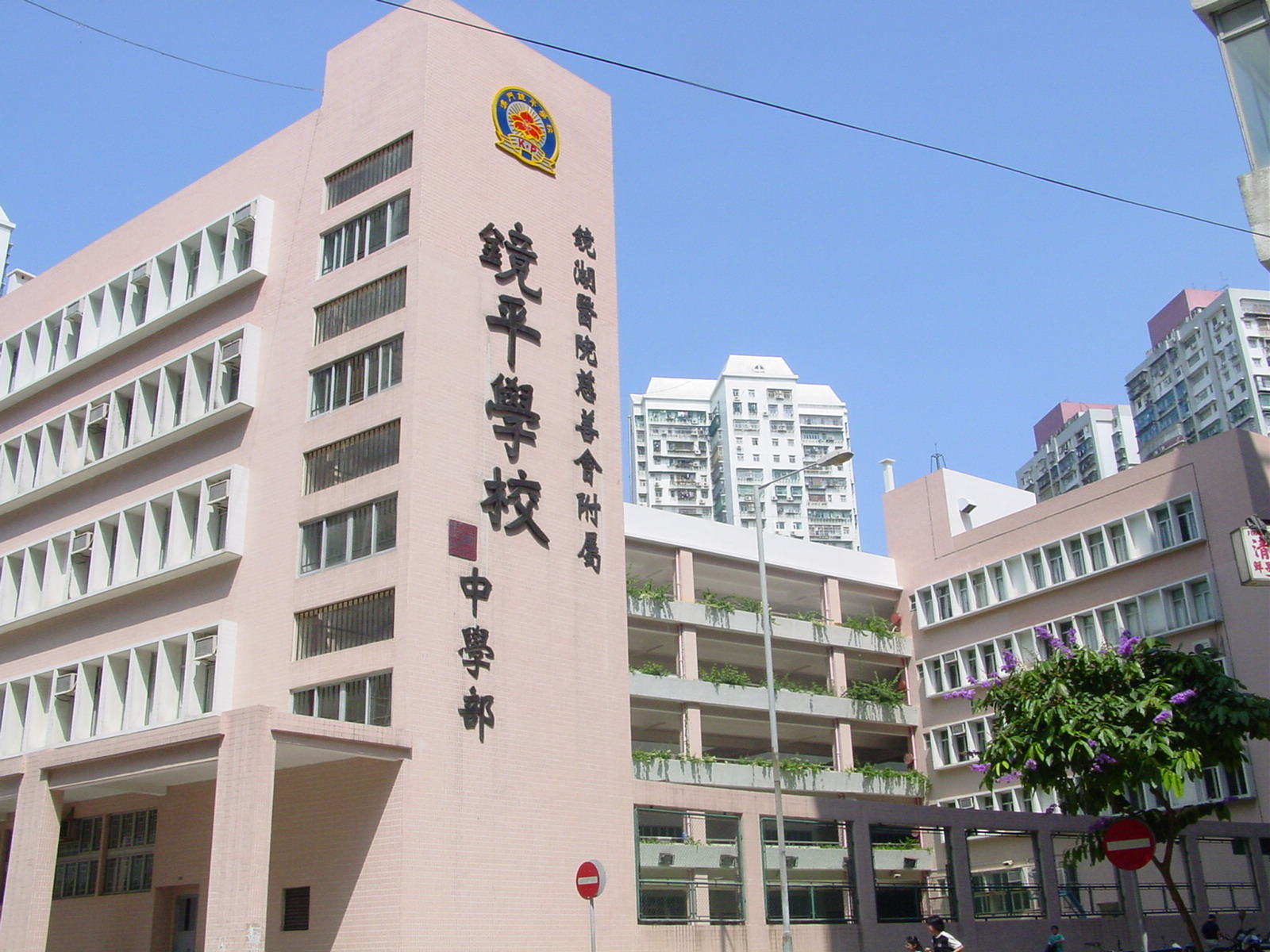
Secondary building

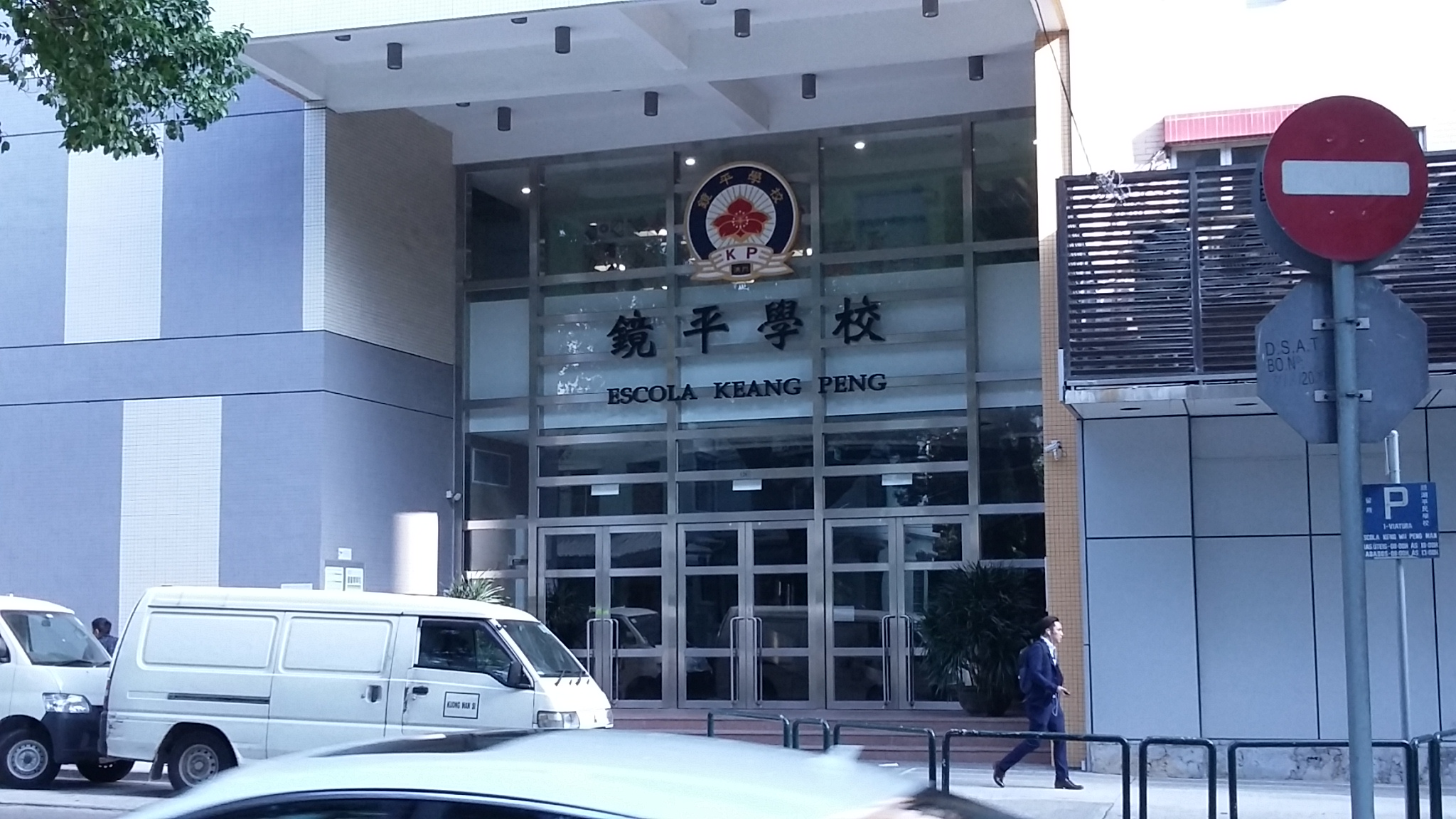
Primary building

Keang Peng School (Chinese: 鏡平學校, Portuguese: Escola Keang Peng) is a private school in Nossa Senhora de Fátima, Macau, with two campuses, one each for preschool/primary and secondary levels.
