= Matteo Ricci (footballer, born February 1994) =

Italian footballer

Personal information
- Date of birth: 4 February 1994 (age 32)
- Place of birth: Lucca, Italy
- Height: 1.95 m (6 ft 5 in)
- Position: Goalkeeper

Youth career
- Empoli

Senior career*
Years	Team	Apps	(Gls)
2012–2016	Empoli	0	(0)
2012–2013	→ Pontedera (loan)	11	(0)
2015	→ Pistoiese (loan)	19	(0)
2015–2016	→ Livorno (loan)	8	(0)
2016–2017	Olhanense	7	(0)
2017	Olbia	12	(0)
2018	Teramo	0	(0)
2019	Massese	19	(0)
2019–2020	Livorno	3	(0)
2021	Carpi	1	(0)

International career
2010	Italy U16	2	(0)
2010–2011	Italy U17	3	(0)
2011–2012	Italy U18	4	(0)
- * Club domestic league appearances and goals as of 2 May 2021

Matteo Ricci (born 4 February 1994) is an Italian footballer who plays as a goalkeeper.

== History ==
On 3 July 2015, Ricci was signed by Livorno.

On 5 September 2019, he returned to Livorno.

On 30 March 2021, he joined Serie C club Carpi, after two of their goalkeepers (Andrea Rossini and Alessio Pozzi) were injured.
