= Matteo Ricci College =

College at Seattle University, Washington, U.S.

Coordinates: 47°36′32″N 122°19′05″W

- Established: 1975; 51 years ago
- Purpose: Humanistic education
- Students: c.70 per year
- Affiliations: Seattle University; Catholic church (Jesuit)
- Staff: 19
- Website: Matteo Ricci Dept.

Matteo Ricci College, one of eight schools and colleges at Seattle University in Washington state, offers three degrees: the Bachelor of Arts in Humanities for Teaching (BAHT), the Bachelor of Arts in Humanities for Leadership (BAHL), and the Bachelor of Arts in humanities (BAH). The BAHT, a 4-year pre-education degree, and the BAHL, a 4-year leadership degree, are open to students from anywhere in the world. The BAH is a 3-year degree open to select students from Seattle Preparatory and five other high schools in the area, while those completing an on-line offering are also able to apply.

== Background ==
The college is named after the 16th-century Jesuit missionary to China Matteo Ricci, who worked closely with the local people learning from the Chinese while simultaneously sharing European ideas. Ricci College unites the efforts of a Jesuit college and high school that had been founded together in 1891. It was initiated in 1975 in response to the 1973 call by Jesuit Father General Pedro Arrupe that Jesuit schools educate men and women for others, a theme taken up by the Jesuit Secondary Education Association in the United States. It would require students to become more active learners, through less lecturing and more seminars, student interchange, and essays. Funding came from the Carnegie Foundation. The high school part of the Ricci program has been described on the University of Washington website as a "well-known dual enrollment program".

== Programs ==
From 1975, Seattle Prep students completed the Bachelor of Arts in humanities (BAH) with just three years of high school and three years of college. In 1984 Prep re-established a fourth year for students who needed it. In 1988 Ricci College opened its doors more widely to the 3-year BAH for students from five local Catholic schools, beginning with O'Dea and Kennedy Catholic and later adding Eastside Catholic, Forest Ridge and Archbishop Murphy high schools who completed university classes during their senior year of high school. Since 2015 students who successfully complete one or more of Seattle University's online offerings with the Jesuit Virtual Learning Academy are also eligible to apply for the BAH degree.

In 2002, Matteo Ricci College launched the BAH for Teaching degree, and in 2011 the college added the BAH for Leadership degree. Each of the three degrees is built on the humanities curriculum as a foundation for further studies.

== Student activism ==
In 2016 students in the program succeeded in having the dean of Ricci College removed for, in their view, focusing the program too narrowly on Western ideas and history and for failing to address issues like social justice, gender differences, poverty, and mass incarceration. These issues are raised by the Poverty Education Center of Ricci College, which "promotes the teaching of issues such as inequality, underdevelopment, and injustice at all levels of education and to a variety of audiences. It provides teachers and students with a deep, humanistic understanding of the economics, politics, history, culture, and ethics of poverty in the United States and around the world." It was noted that University of California Davis and the University of Washington were going through somewhat similar struggles, as regards racism, at the time. The students were also protesting that Dean recommended Dick Gregory's autobiography Nigger – though Gregory came to the dean's support.
