= Zheng Guanying Official School =

Government school in Macau

- 鄭觀應公立學校; Escola Oficial Zheng Guanying
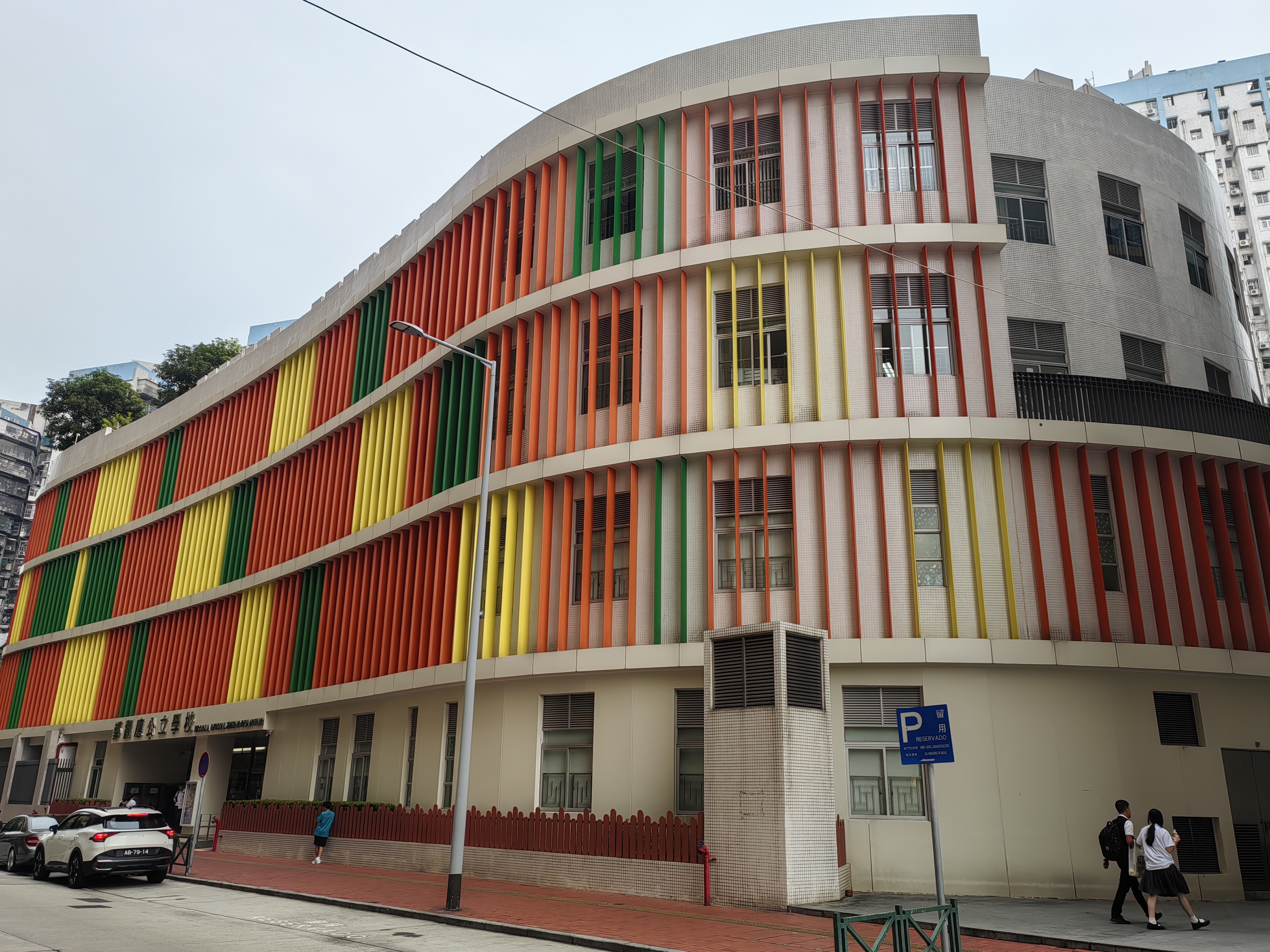

Location
- Rua Marginal do Canal das Hortas, s/n 台山菜園涌邊街; Macau
- Coordinates: 22.2135074°N 113.54475839999998°E

Information
- Former name: Escola Luso-Chinesa de Tamagnini Barbosa
- Type: Government school
- Language: Mandarin Chinese (most subjects)
- Website: www.eozgy.k12.edu.mo

Zheng Guanying Official School

Escola Oficial Zheng Guanying
- Traditional Chinese: 鄭觀應公立學校
- Simplified Chinese: 郑观应公立学校
- Literal meaning: Zheng Guanying Public School
Transcriptions
Standard Mandarin
- Hanyu Pinyin: Zhèng Guānyìng Gōnglì Xuéxiào
Yue: Cantonese
- Jyutping: zeng6 gun1 jing3 gung1 laap6 hok6 haau6

Escola Primária Luso-Chinesa de Tamagnini Barbosa
- Traditional Chinese: 巴波沙中葡小學
- Simplified Chinese: 巴波沙中葡小学
- Literal meaning: Barbosa Luso-Chinese Primary School
Transcriptions
Standard Mandarin
- Hanyu Pinyin: Bābōshā Zhōng Pú Xiǎoxué
Yue: Cantonese
- Jyutping: baa1 bo1 saa1 zung1 pou4 siu2 hok6

Portuguese name
- Portuguese: Escola Oficial Zheng Guanying

Zheng Guanying Official School (Chinese: 鄭觀應公立學校, Portuguese: Escola Oficial Zheng Guanying, EOZGY) is a primary and secondary school in Toi San, Nossa Senhora de Fátima, Macau. It is named after Zheng Guanying. As of 2021 it was the sole governmental educational institution in the special administrative region using Standard Mandarin as a language of education.

As of 2016, the headmistress was Wu Kit (胡潔).

== History ==
The school opened in 2011 in the facilities of the former Escola Luso-Chinesa de Tamagnini Barbosa (巴波沙中葡小學). For each subsequent year, the Zheng Guanying school opened another instructional year. The school was the first government school to use Mandarin as its main instructional medium. In addition, Portuguese was to be used for some classes.

Some parents on social media criticized the school in 2016, stating the fact that students were taking different classes in different languages and that this affected the academic performances of their children. The school administration argued that the parents simply were not accustomed to the format of the school.

In 2017, the school, along with another government school, the Escola Luso-Chinesa da Flora, started pilot bilingual Portuguese–Mandarin classes, and some students were taken out of the school as a result.

The school inaugurated its new facilities in 2018.

== Curriculum ==
Mandarin Chinese is the language of instruction of most subjects, while music and physical education are taught in Portuguese. By 2017 the school started a pilot programme for bilingual Portuguese–Mandarin classes.

== See also ==
- Escola Oficial Zheng Guanying bus stop (in Chinese)
