= International School of Macao =

International school in Taipa, Macau

- 澳門國際學校; Escola Internacional de Macau

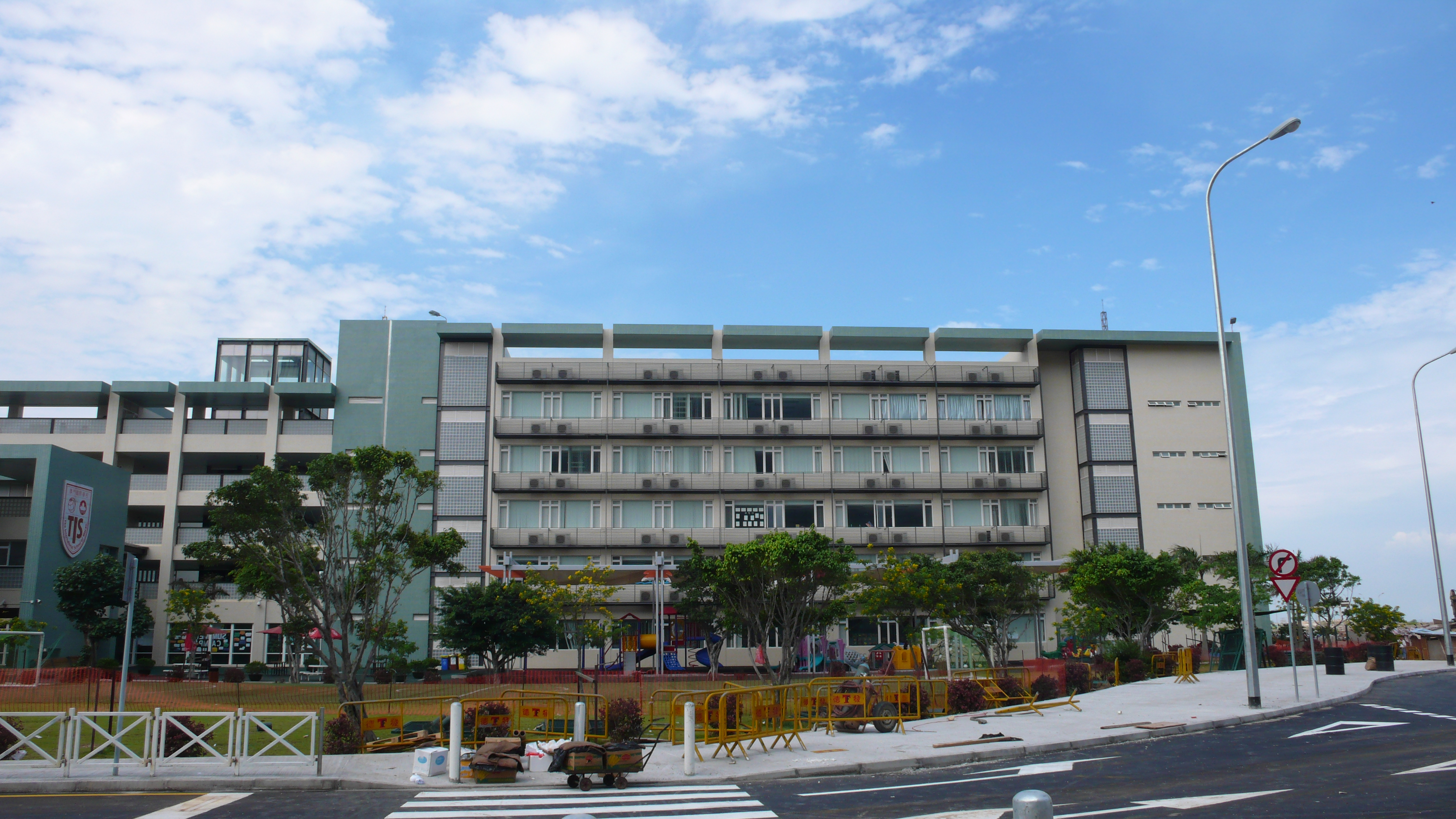
- Block K

Location
- Macau University of Science and Technology, Blocks K and Q, Avenida Wai Long, Taipa; Macau
- 22.1509°N 113.5691°E

Information
- Type: Private school
- Motto: Knowledge Knows No Bounds
- Established: 2002
- Staff: 124
- Grades: Pre-K to Grade 12
- Enrollment: 1,281
- Language: English, Chinese
- Colour
- Mascot: Tiger
- Website: www.tis.edu.mo

The International School of Macao

Chinese name
- Traditional Chinese: 澳門國際學校
- Simplified Chinese: 澳门国际学校
Transcriptions
Standard Mandarin
- Hanyu Pinyin: Àomén Guójì Xuéxiào
Yue: Cantonese
- Jyutping: ou3 mun4*2 gwok3 zai3 hok6 haau6

Portuguese name
- Portuguese: Escola Internacional de Macau

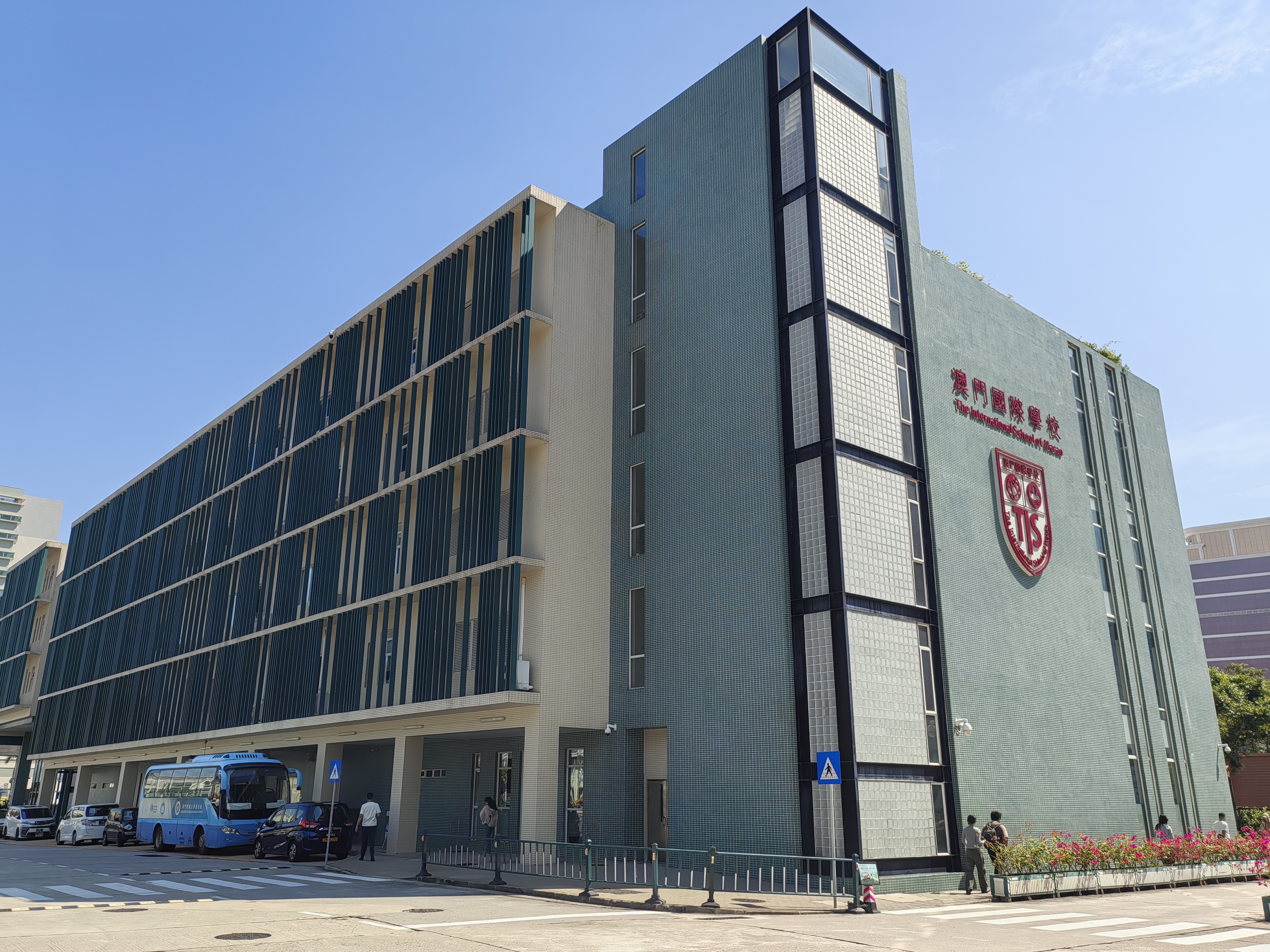
Block Q

The International School of Macao (TIS; Portuguese: Escola Internacional de Macau; Chinese: 澳門國際學校) is a private school in Taipa, Macau. It occupies the blocks K and Q of the Macau University of Science and Technology.

== History ==
TIS was founded in 2002 to provide a Canadian curriculum and accreditation to both local and international students.

TIS opened with 58 students enrolled on the campus of Macau University of Science and Technology. The school was originally located in Block E. The school has expanded to over 500 pupils by 2006, when it moved into the first phase of its new, purpose-built structure on the MUST campus. The school declared in 2016 that it will invest 180 million Macau patacas (US$22,400,000) on the campus's second phase.
