= Colégio Mateus Ricci =

Roman Catholic school in Macau

Chinese name
- Traditional Chinese: 利瑪竇中學
- Simplified Chinese: 利玛窦中学
Transcriptions
Standard Mandarin
- Hanyu Pinyin: Lì Mǎdòu Zhōngxué
Yue: Cantonese
- Jyutping: lei6 maa5 dau3 zung1 hok6

Portuguese name
- Portuguese: Colégio Mateus Ricci

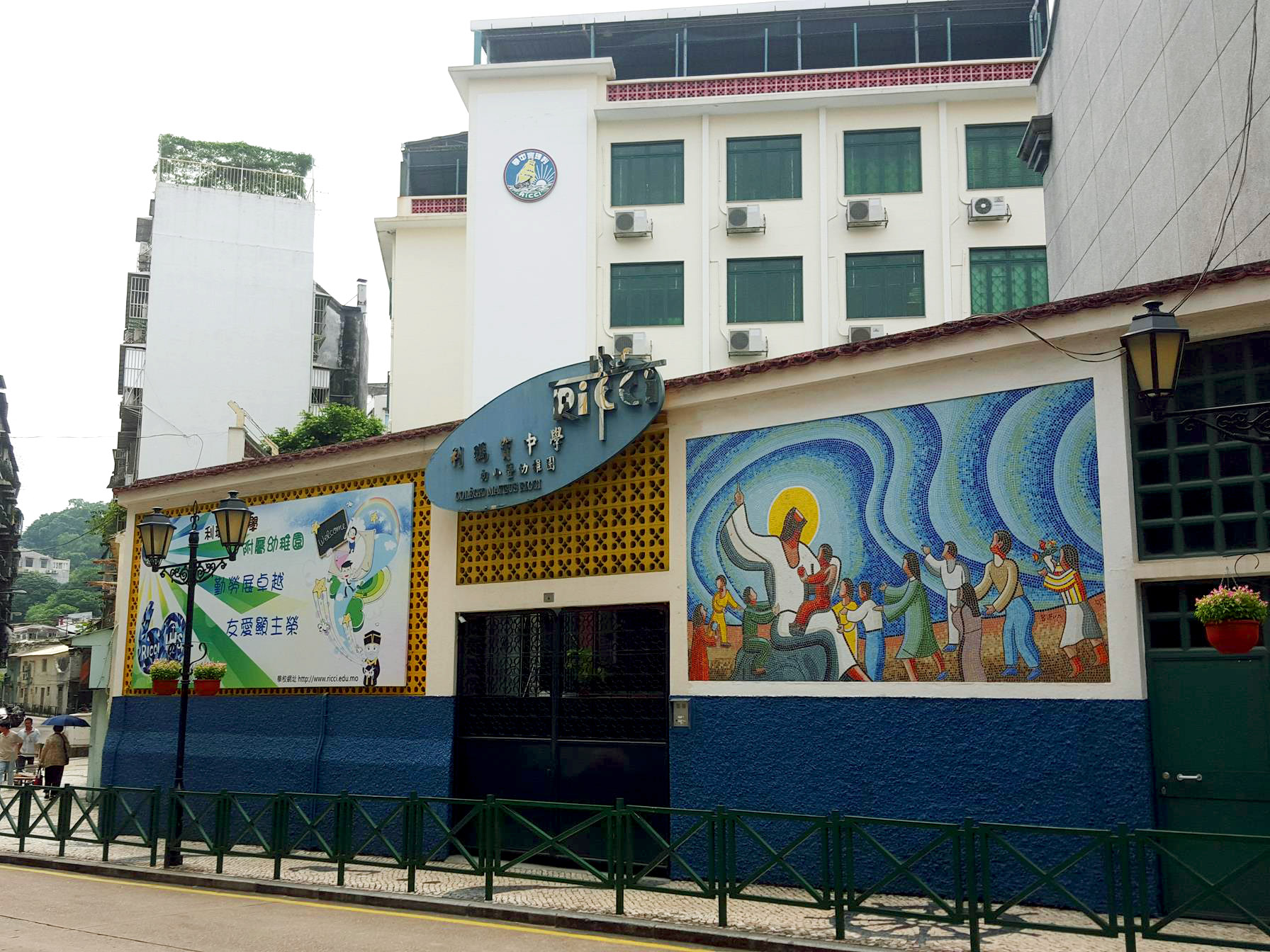
Colégio Mateus Ricci

Colégio Mateus Ricci (Chinese: 利瑪竇中學) is a Roman Catholic kindergarten/preschool through secondary school in Macau and a member of the Macau Catholic Schools Association. It was named after Matteo Ricci and established in 1955. Caritas Macau established the school.

It was established by Caritas Macau in 1955. The school was named in honor of the Italian Jesuit priest Matteo Ricci.

Former primary school buildings are listed as a part of Macau's cultural heritage by the Cultural Affairs Bureau.

== Campuses ==
The school has three separate campuses in Santo António (St. Anthony Parish), one for secondary grades, and two for nursery/kindergarten and primary grades.

== Curriculum ==
Colégio Mateus Ricci primarily conducts instruction in Chinese and seeks to continue and promote Matteo Ricci's educational ideals. The school offers a junior secondary education curriculum for grades 1 through 6, as well as a secondary diploma program. Additionally, students have access to a variety of extracurricular activities, including arts, technology, sports, and community service.

== Student body ==
As of 2010 the school had almost 2,000 students.
