= Andrew Jackson (disambiguation) =

Andrew Jackson (1767–1845) was the seventh president of the United States from 1829 to 1837.

Andrew Jackson or Andy Jackson may also refer to:

== People ==
=== Arts and entertainment ===
- Andy Jackson (sound engineer), British recording engineer
- Andrew Jackson (actor) (born 1963), Canadian actor
- Andrew Jackson (visual effects), Australian visual effects artist

=== Sports ===
- Andrew Jackson (footballer) (1856–1930), Scottish international footballer
- Andrew Jackson (baseball) (1865–1900), African-American baseball player
- Andy Jackson (footballer, born 1890) (1890–1918), Scottish footballer (Middlesbrough FC)
- Andy Jackson (tennis) (born 1961), head coach of the Division I Florida Gators men's tennis team
- Andrew Jackson (running back) (born 1964), American football running back for the Houston Oilers
- Andy Jackson (cricketer) (born 1979), Trinidadian cricketer
- Andy Jackson (footballer, born 1988), Scottish-born Irish footballer
- Andrew Jackson (linebacker) (born 1992), American football linebacker

=== Others ===
- Andrew Jackson Jr. (1808–1865), adopted son of U.S. president Andrew Jackson
- Andrew B. Jackson (1814–1878), American pioneer and territorial legislator
- Andrew Jackson (pastor) (1828–1901), Swedish-born American pastor
- Andrew Jackson (Michigan politician) (1844–1899), Michigan politician and soldier
- Andrew O. Jackson (born 1941), American plant virologist
- Andrew Jackson (geophysicist), British geophysicist

== Sculptures ==
- Equestrian statue of Andrew Jackson (Washington, D.C.), 1852 equestrian statue by Clark Mills in Lafayette Square, Washington, D.C.
- Statue of Andrew Jackson (U.S. Capitol), 1928 bronze sculpture by Belle Kinney Scholz and Leopold Scholz in the US Capitol in Washington D.C.

== Other uses ==
- Andrew Jackson (clipper), clipper ship
- USS Andrew Jackson, submarine
- Andrew Jackson, Alabama, unincorporated community in Tallapoosa County, Alabama
- Andrew Jackson, character in An Almost Perfect Affair

== See also ==
- Andrew Jackson University, private university
- Andrew Jackson Donelson (1799–1871), nephew and secretary of president Jackson
- Andrew Jackson Jihad, band
- Drew Jackson (born 1993), American baseball player
- Andrew J. Van Vorhes (Andrew Jackson Van Vorhes, 1824–1873), American politician and newspaper editor
