= Michael Goodin =

Jamaican plant virologist (1967–2020)

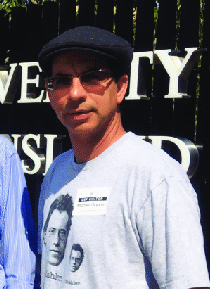
Michael M. Goodin

Michael Maurice Goodin (April 8, 1967 – December 12, 2020) was a Jamaican-born plant virologist. He researched interactions between the virus and the host cell, focusing on rhabdoviruses that infect plants. He also studied emerging plant viruses, including economically significant viruses infecting coffee plants. He co-invented a widely used method of generating large amounts of expressed proteins in leaves infiltrated with Agrobacterium (with Ralf Dietzgen), and developed other techniques for plant molecular virology research. Goodin moved to the United States in around 1989 and was a professor at the University of Kentucky from 2017 until his death.

== Education, career and awards ==
Goodin was born on April 8, 1967, in Jamaica. His mother, a librarian, was Canadian and the family moved to Hamilton, Ontario, in the early 1980s. After gaining his first degree in biology and chemistry at Brock University, St. Catharines, Ontario (1989), Goodin moved to the United States to attend Pennsylvania State University, where he obtained his MS (1992) and PhD (1995) degrees in plant pathology. His thesis (entitled "Characterization of two viruses associated with Agaricus bisporus") was on La France disease of mushrooms, which is caused by fungal viruses; his doctoral advisor was C. Peter Romaine.

His first postdoctoral position was at the University of California, Berkeley (1996–2002), under the plant virologist Andrew O. Jackson. In 2002, Goodin moved to the Department of Plant Pathology at the University of Kentucky, rising to full professor in 2017, as well as head of the Plant Science Biological Imaging Facility (from 2008).

In addition to his academic teaching, Goodin promoted the study of biology in local schools and taught Kenyan students online. He was awarded the Teacher Who Made a Difference Award in 2012. He was an advocate for the Black Lives Matter movement and received the American Society for Microbiology's Honorary Diversity Lecturer award in 2018, for his work promoting the study of microbiology to underrepresented minorities.

== Research ==
Goodin's research focused on interactions between the virus and the host cell. Much of his work was with rhabdoviruses that infect plants, particularly Sonchus yellow net virus (SYNV) and potato yellow dwarf virus, which have nonsegmented, negative-stranded RNA genomes and replicate in the cell nucleus. In Jackson's laboratory, he studied the nuclear localization of SYNV, showing that the virus's N and P proteins have different localization signals and enter the nucleus by different mechanisms. At the University of Kentucky, he continued his work on the localization of viral proteins and on the interactions between rhabdo- and other negative-strand virus proteins and plant-cell proteins.

He developed several useful techniques for plant virological research. While at Jackson's laboratory, in collaboration with Ralf Dietzgen, Goodin invented an Agrobacterium-mediated protein expression vector, pGD, which could generate large amounts of expressed proteins in leaves infiltrated with Agrobacterium. Jackson describes this technique in 2021 as in "widespread use ... as a basic tool for plant biology studies" and also comments that it resulted in the highest-cited paper from his laboratory. He created tools for investigating interactions between viral and plant proteins at the molecular level that are used internationally. He helped to develop a minireplicon system for SYNV, which was the earliest successful one for a negative-stranded RNA virus of plants. He also helped to develop the tobacco-related plant, Nicotiana benthamiana, further as a model host for a wide range of plant viruses.

Goodin also worked on coffee ringspot viruses, which are economically significant emerging viruses of Brazilian coffee plants, in collaboration with Antonia dos Reis Figueira at the Universidade Federal de Lavras, Brazil. At the time of his death he was co-editing a special issue of the journal Viruses on plant virus emergence with Jeanmarie Verchot; the issue was subsequently dedicated in his honor.

== Personal life and legacy ==
Goodin married Angelika Fath, whom he met at the University of California, Berkeley; they had a daughter and a son. He maintained a blog, The Green Orange Cafe, in which he published "thought-provoking essays that drew important connections between science and other aspects of life".

He died suddenly on December 12, 2020, in Lexington, Kentucky, at the age of 53. The Michael Goodin Global Aspirations Award was established in his honor at the College of Agriculture, Food and Environment of the University of Kentucky in January 2021.

== Selected publications ==
Reviews

- Michael M. Goodin, David Zaitlin, Rayapati A. Naidu, Steven A. Lommel (2008). Nicotiana benthamiana: Its History and Future as a Model for Plant–Pathogen Interactions. Molecular Plant–Microbe Interactions 21 (8): 1015–1026 doi:10.1094/MPMI-21-8-1015
- Steven A. Whitham, Chunling Yang, Michael M. Goodin (2006). Global Impact: Elucidating Plant Responses to Viral Infection. Molecular Plant–Microbe Interactions 19 (11): 1207–1215

Research articles

- Kathleen Martin, Kristin Kopperud, Romit Chakrabarty, Rituparna Banerjee, Robert Brooks, Michael M. Goodin (2009). Transient expression in Nicotiana benthamiana fluorescent marker lines provides enhanced definition of protein localization, movement and interactions in planta. The Plant Journal 59 (1): 150–162 doi:10.1111/j.1365-313X.2009.03850.x
- Michael M. Goodin, Ralf G. Dietzgen, Denise Schichnes, Steven Ruzin, Andrew O. Jackson (2002). pGD vectors: versatile tools for the expression of green and red fluorescent protein fusions in agroinfiltrated plant leaves. The Plant Journal 31 (3): 375–383 doi:10.1046/j.1365-313X.2002.01360.x
