= Kin Hong Ip =

Macau architectural conservator and academic

Kin Hong Ip (Chinese: 葉健雄) is a Macau architectural conservator and academic whose work concerns the scientific conservation of historic buildings and traditional construction materials. She is a research assistant professor at the University of Macau and has participated in conservation projects involving sites within the Historic Centre of Macau.

== Education and career ==
Ip received a PhD in architectural heritage conservation from the University of Technology Sydney. She subsequently worked at the Macau Museum of Art and the Cultural Affairs Bureau of Macau, where she was involved in the conservation of architectural heritage and movable cultural objects.

From 2020 to 2024, she was an assistant professor at the Macau University of Science and Technology and director of its Heritage Conservation Laboratory. She joined the University of Macau as a research assistant professor in 2024.

== Conservation work ==
Ip's work combines materials analysis, laboratory testing and traditional restoration techniques. She has participated in the conservation of churches, temples, rammed-earth structures and other protected buildings in Macau.

In 2016, the news outlet All About Macau profiled her while she was working on the conservation of St. Joseph's Seminary and Church, discussing her use of scientific testing in architectural restoration.

Her later work has included conservation relating to the bronze sculptures on the façade of the Ruins of Saint Paul's. In 2024, China National Radio published a profile of Ip concerning her conservation work and heritage education in Macau.
