= Santa Casa da Misericórdia of Macau =

Historic building in Macau, China

- Santa Casa da Misericórdia
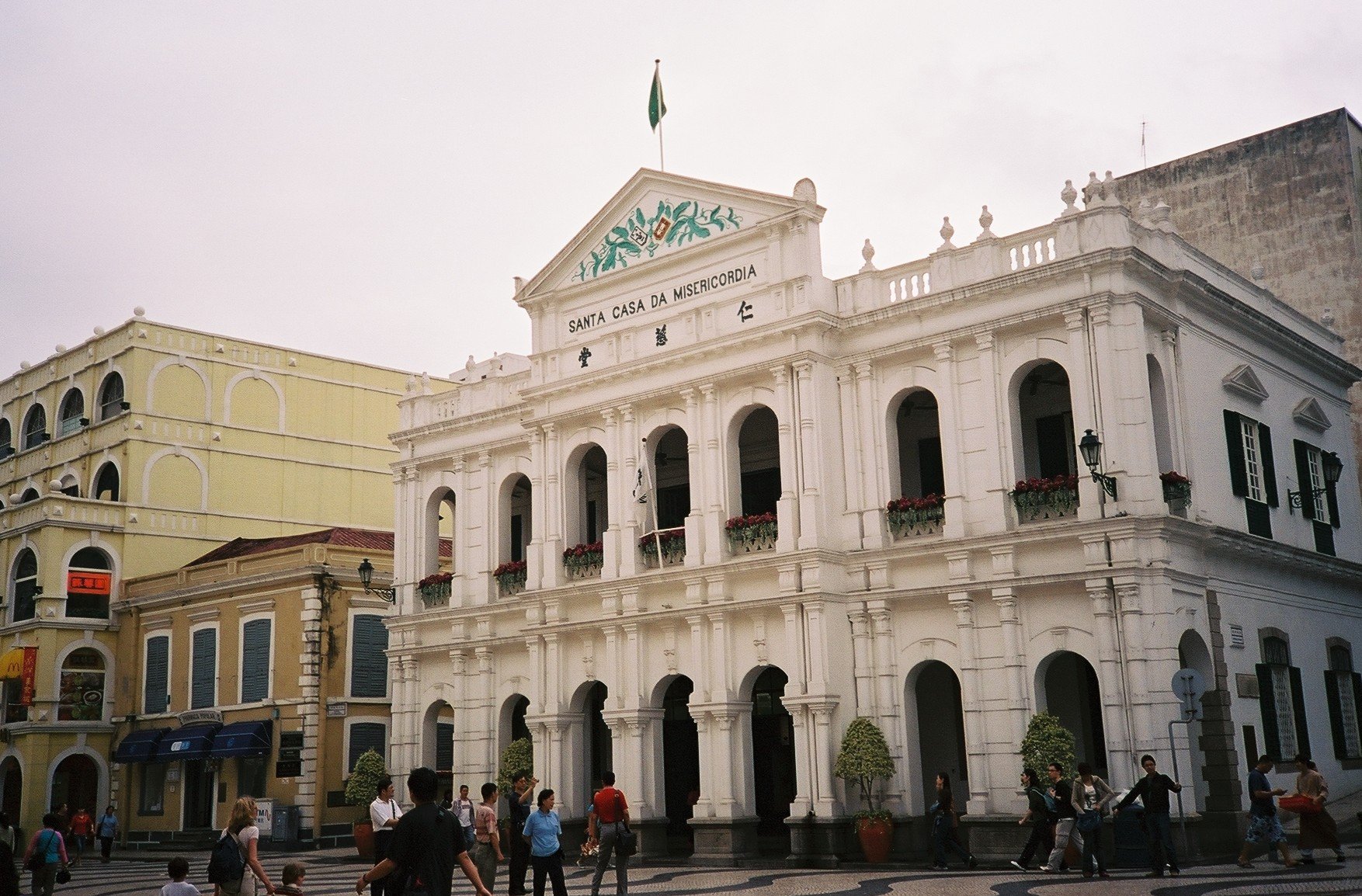
- Façade of the Holy House of Mercy
- Interactive map of the Santa Casa da Misericórdia of Macau area

General information
- Location: Travessa da Misericórdia, n.o 7
- Coordinates: 22°11′37″N 113°32′25″E
- SAR: Macau

Website
- scmm.mo

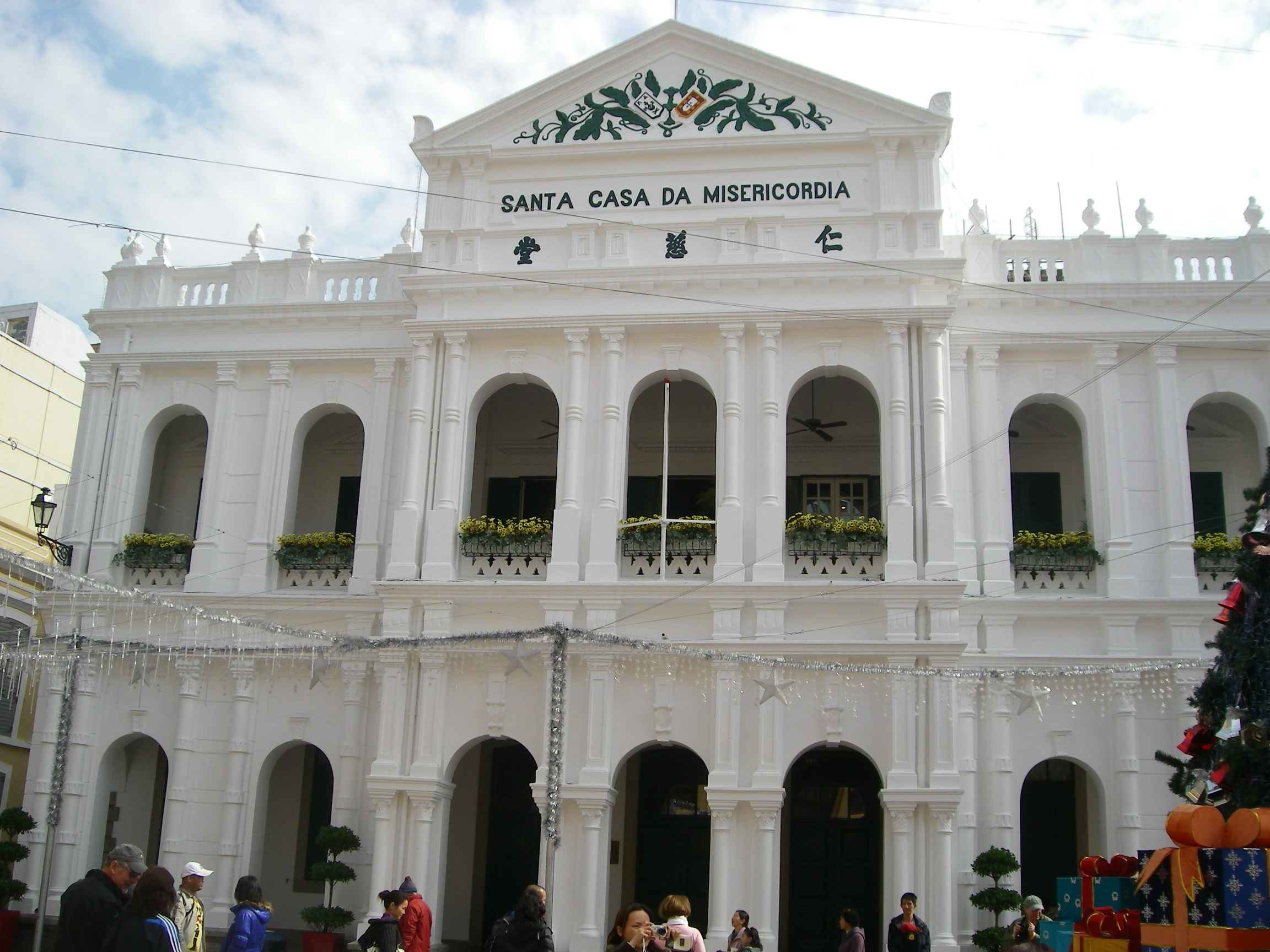
Facade of the Holy House of Mercy

Santa Casa da Misericórdia of Macau

Chinese name
- Traditional Chinese: 仁慈堂大樓
- Simplified Chinese: 仁慈堂大楼
Transcriptions
Standard Mandarin
- Hanyu Pinyin: Réncítáng Dàlóu
Yue: Cantonese
- Jyutping: jan4 ci4 tong4 daai6 lau4

Portuguese name
- Portuguese: Santa Casa da Misericórdia

The Holy House of Mercy of Macau (Portuguese: Santa Casa da Misericórdia; Chinese: 仁慈堂大樓), is a historic building in Senado Square, Sé, Macau. Established as a branch of the Santa Casa da Misericórdia, it was first built in 1569 on the orders of the Bishop of Macau, Belchior Carneiro Leitão.

It was a medical clinic and several other social welfare structures in early Macau. It later served as an orphanage and refuge for widows of sailors lost at sea.

It is part of the Historic Centre of Macau, a UNESCO World Heritage Site.

== See also ==
- Santa Casa da Misericórdia
- List of Bishops of Macau
- Leal Senado
- Macau General Post Office
