= Leal Senado Building =

- Edifício do Leal Senado
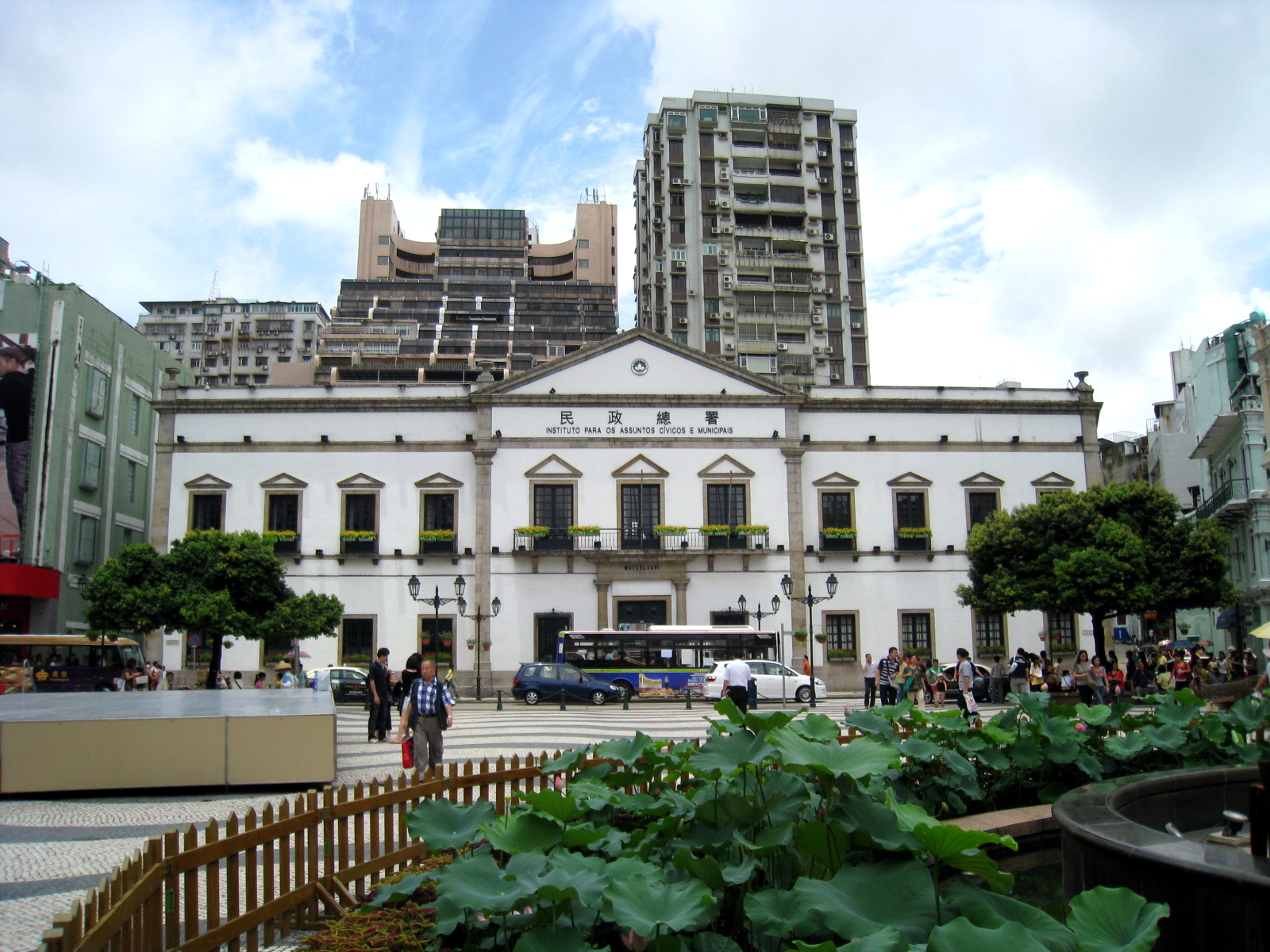
- Façade of the old Leal Senado building

- Location within Macau

General information
- Type: Government building
- Location: Macau, China, No. 163 Avenida de Almeida Ribeiro
- Coordinates: 22.1933°N 113.5394°E
- Current tenants: Municipal Affairs Bureau
- Completed: 1784
- Client: Portuguese government
- Owner: Macau government (current)

Leal Senado Building

Chinese name
- Traditional Chinese: 民政總署大樓
- Simplified Chinese: 民政总署大楼
Transcriptions
Standard Mandarin
- Hanyu Pinyin: Mínzhèng Zǒngshǔ Dàlóu
Yue: Cantonese
- Jyutping: man4 zing3 zong2 cyu5 daai6 lau4

Portuguese name
- Portuguese: Edifício do Leal Senado

Map

The Leal Senado Building was the seat of Portuguese Macau's government (Legislative Assembly of Macau and Municipal Council of Macau). It is located at one end of the Senado Square in São Lourenço, Macau, China. It currently houses Macau's Municipal Affairs Bureau.

== Name ==
The title Leal Senado (lit. 'Loyal Senate') was bestowed on Macau's government in 1810 by Portugal's prince regent João, who later became King John VI of Portugal. This was a reward for Macau's loyalty to Portugal, which refused to recognise Spain’s sovereignty during the Philippine Dynasty that it occupied Portugal, between 1580 and 1640. A plaque ordered by the king commemorating this can still be seen inside the entrance hall.

== History ==
A Chinese-style Pavilion used to stand on the site of Leal Senado building. That building was then a meeting place for the Portuguese and the Chinese officials, and where the Ming dynasty government would announce regulations to Macau. The Portuguese planned to buy the pavilion as early as 1583, as well as some Chinese houses behind it. However, it wasn't until 1784 that the Portuguese government finally purchased it at a price of 80,000 taels.

The Leal Senado building itself was built after the purchase, and became the center of Macau's politics since then. Portuguese rallies and celebrations were also held here. Although built in 1784, it was in a style similar to plain style from 14th- to 15th-century Portugal than the Pombaline style that was popular at the time when the Leal Senado was built. A number of institutions were affiliated to the building, including a museum of Luís Vaz de Camões, a post office, a court and a prison, yet all had moved elsewhere.

It was completely refurbished in 1904. In 1936 the building was damaged again by another typhoon.

After the handover of Macau to China in 1999 it became the headquarters of the Civic and Municipal Affairs Bureau.

It became part of the UNESCO World Heritage Site Historic Centre of Macau in 2005.

== Features ==
The building is U-shaped. The right part of the first floor of the building features an exhibition hall, hosting art exhibitions on a regular basis. The convention hall is on the second floor, where the public meetings and press conferences of the former Macau Municipal Council and the current Institute of Civic and Municipal Affairs are held. A public library, opened in 1929, is located at the Northwestern part of the first floor. It is blueprinted after the library of Mafra Convent in Portugal, decorated in classical style. It contains around 18,500 books and specialises in collecting foreign language books in dating from 17th century to the 1950s, in particular those of Portuguese history in Africa and the Far East. The building has retained all its original master walls and primary layout, including the courtyard garden in the back.

== Gallery ==
Leal Senado Building, Macau

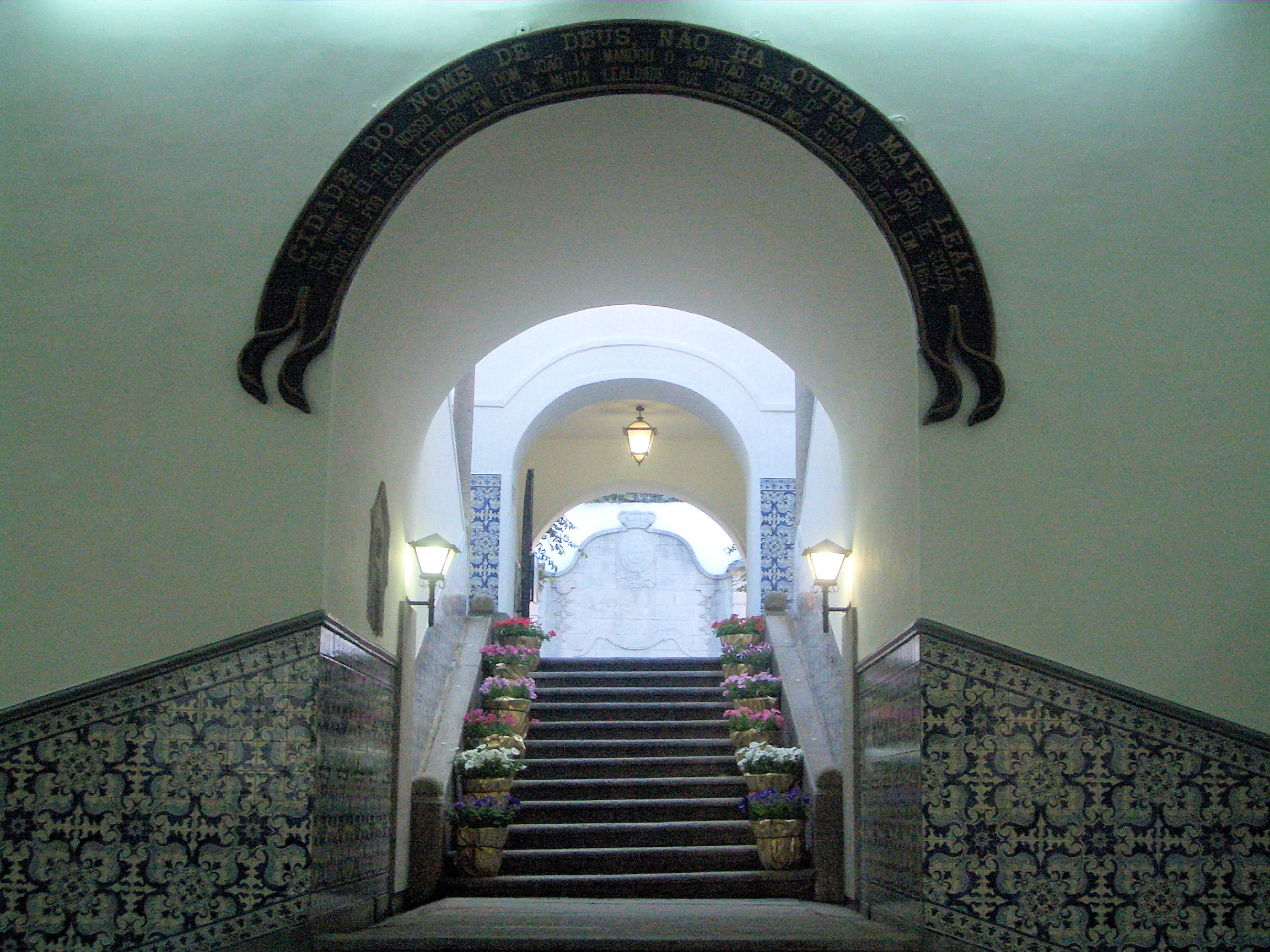
Inside the main entrance, the title granted to Macau by King João IV is displayed.

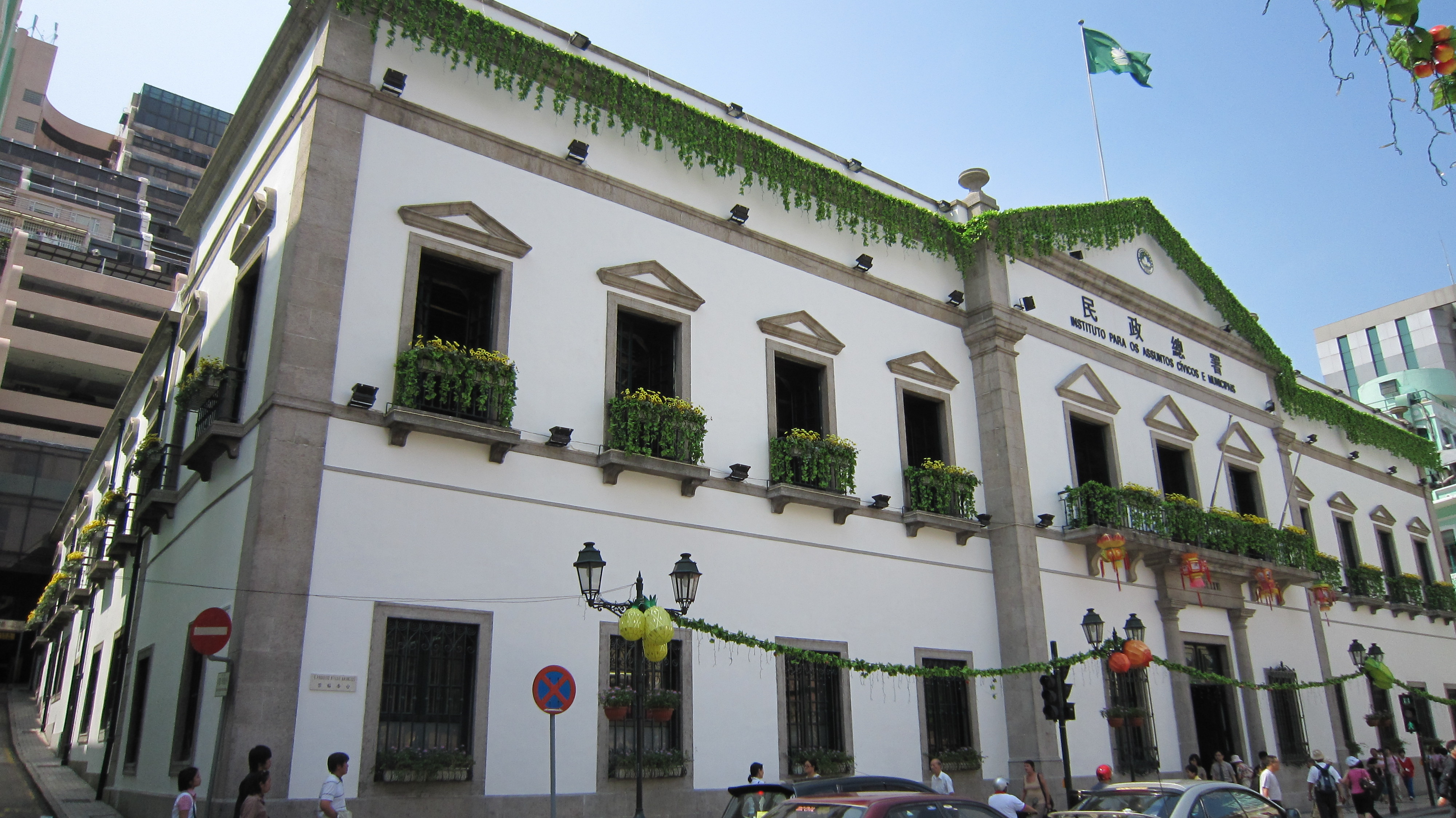
Office building of the former Legislative Assembly of Macau

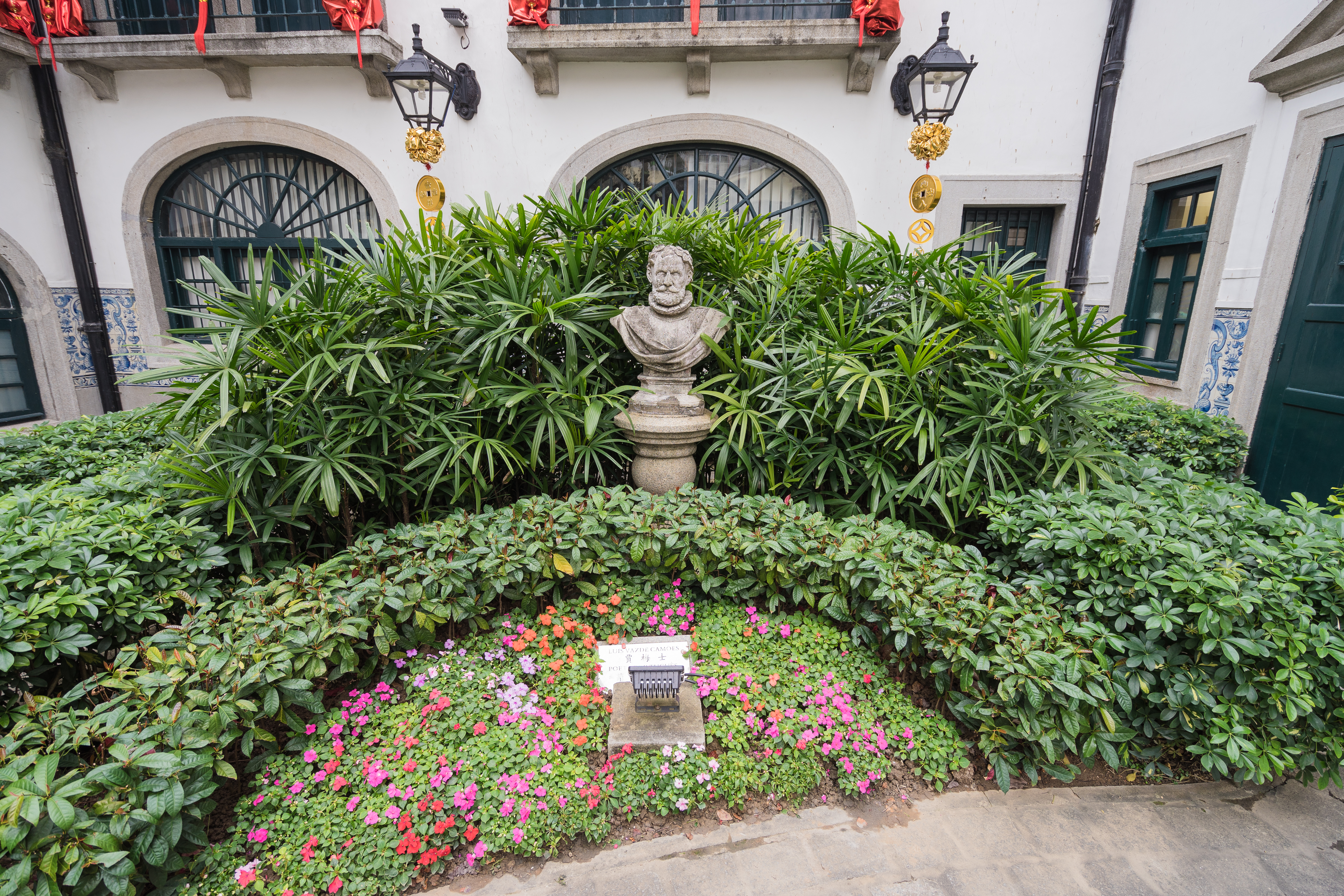
A statue of Luís Vaz de Camões in the back garden

== See also ==
- List of historic buildings and structures in Macau
- Macau General Post Office
- Hotel Central
- Holy House of Mercy
