= Senado Square =

Square in Macau

Coordinates: 22°11′36.9″N 113°32′22.8″E

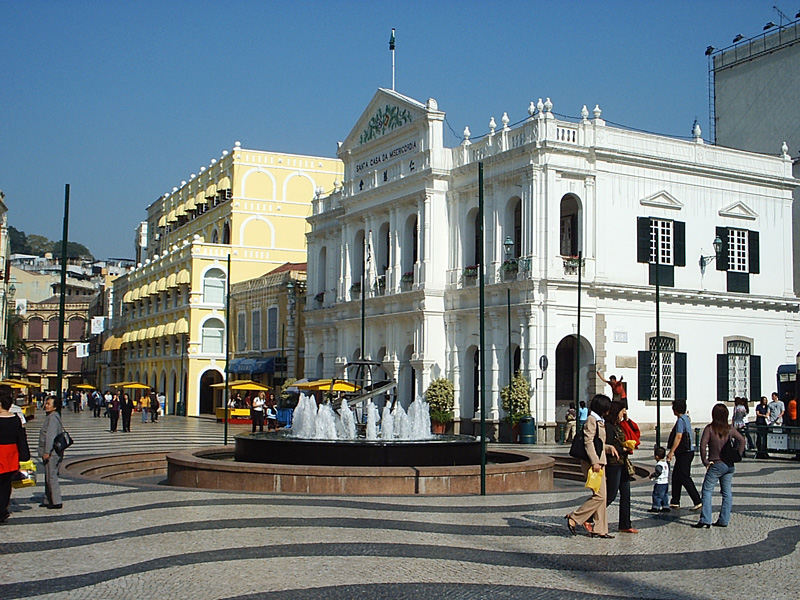
Senado Square during the day

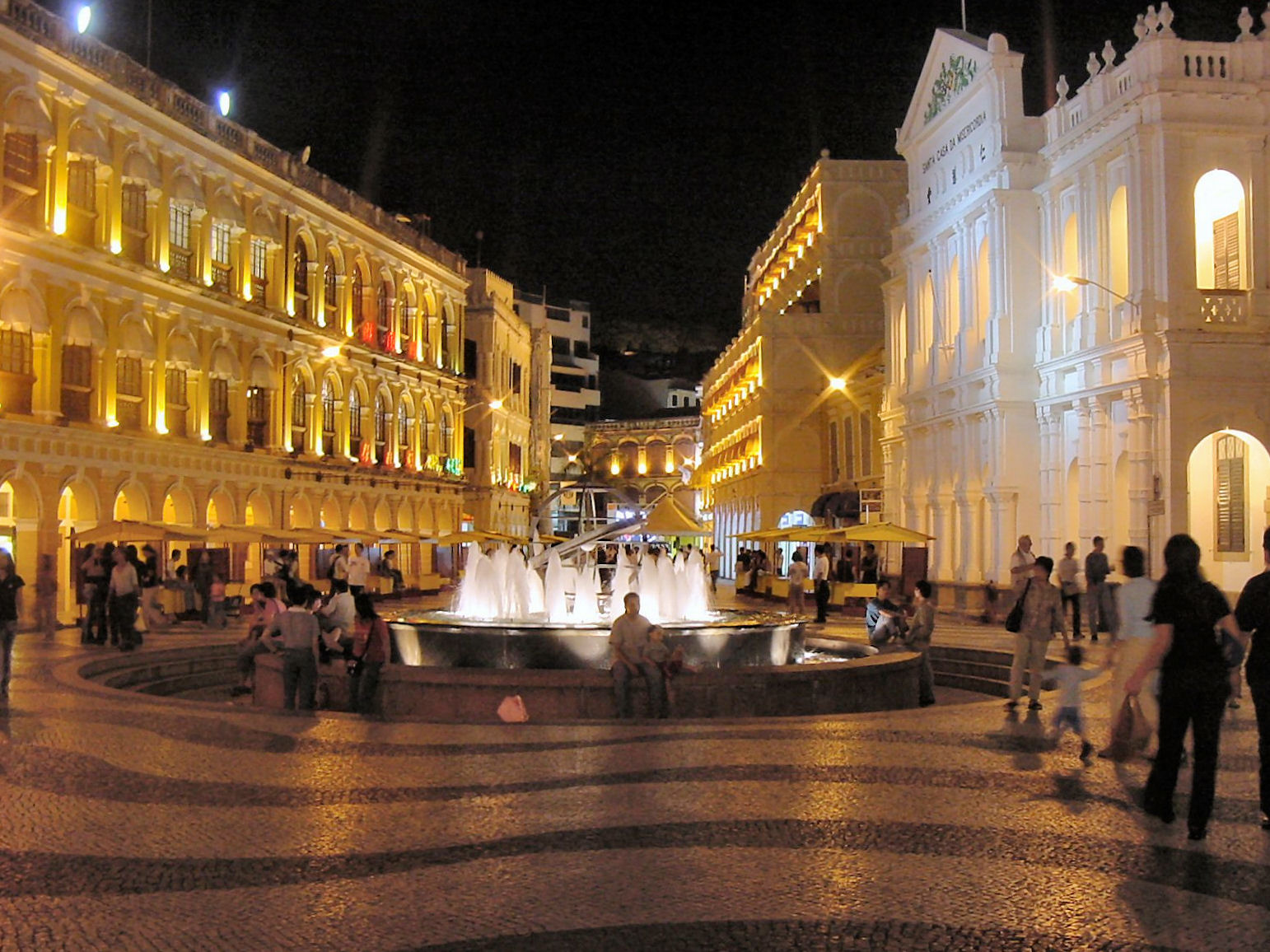
Senado Square

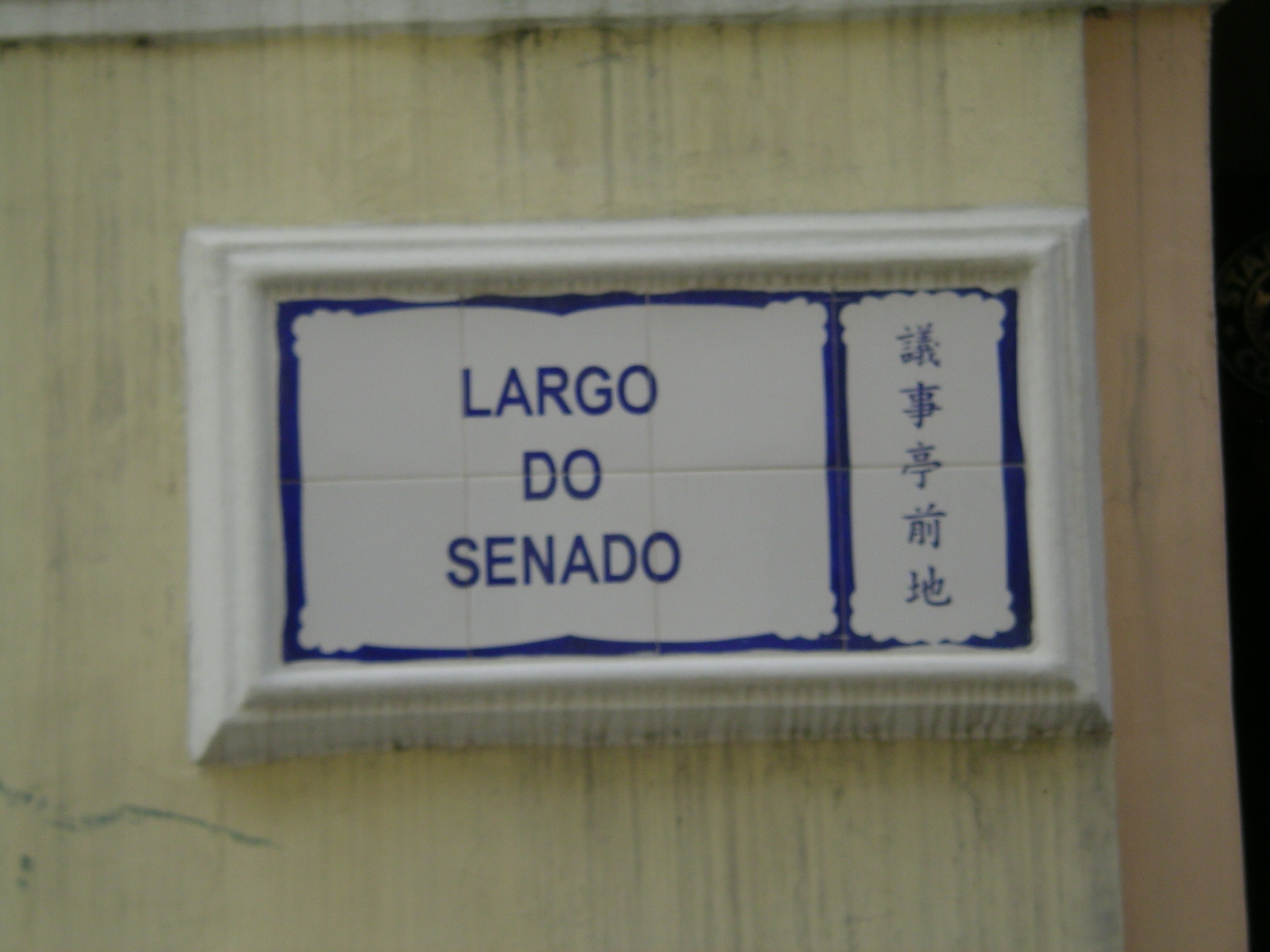
Sign in Portuguese and Chinese

Map

The Senado Square, or Senate Square (Chinese: 議事亭前地; Cantonese Yale: Yíh Sih Tìhng Chìhn Deih; Portuguese: Largo do Senado), is a paved town square in Sé, Macau, China, and part of the UNESCO Historic Centre of Macau World Heritage Site. It is an elongated triangular shaped square and connects Largo do São Domingos at one end and Avenida de Almeida Ribeiro on the other. It covers an area of 3,700 square meters (4,425 square yards)

== History ==
The square was named after the Leal Senado, a meeting place for the Chinese and Portuguese in the 16th to 18th centuries, located directly in front of the square, where Leal Senado Building stands today. In 1940, a small garden was built at the centre of the square, featuring a bronze statue of Vicente Nicolau de Mesquita standing above a stone pillar pulling out a sword. The statue was pulled down in the 12-3 incident as Mesquita was responsible for the deaths of many Qing Chinese soldiers. A fountain was built at its site and still stands today.

Vast majority of the buildings around the square are European styled and many are protected monuments. The square used to allow traffic and parking lots were present, with increasing number of tourists the entire area was covered by Portuguese pavement in the early 1990s and designated a pedestrian-only zone.

Many large events in Macau were hosted on the square, this include festival celebrations, flea markets and performances. The governors of Macau also used to inspect their troops there. A number of Hong Kong films in the 1950s and 1960s had scenes shot at the square.

The 2005 100 patacas note issued by the Banco Nacional Ultramarino features the square on its obverse side.

== Buildings around the square ==
- Holy House of Mercy
- Hotel Central
- Macau General Post Office
- Leal Senado Building

== See also ==
- Statue Square
