= Mengchu Zhou =

Chinese electrical and computer engineer

- Born: 31 October 1963 (age 62)
- Awards: AAAS Fellow; CAA Fellow; IEEE Fellow; IFAC Fellow; Norbert Wiener Award

Academic background
- Education: Nanjing University of Science & Technology (BS); Beijing Institute of Technology (MS); Rensselaer Polytechnic Institute (PhD)

Academic work
- Discipline: electrical and computer engineering
- Institutions: New Jersey Institute of Technology; Macau University of Science and Technology; IKAS Industries of Shenzhen
- Doctoral students: Ying Tang

Mengchu Zhou (Chinese: 周孟初; born 31 October 1963) is a Chinese Distinguished Professor of electrical and computer engineering in the Helen and John C. Hartmann Dept. of Electrical and Computer Engineering at New Jersey Institute of Technology (NJIT) and at Macau University of Science and Technology. He is the Chairman of IKAS Industries of Shenzhen in China. He was the project leader of a national "973" plan in China. and a Board Member of OneSmart Education Group headquartered in China.

He is a Fellow of the Institute of Electrical and Electronics Engineers (IEEE), a Fellow of the International Federation of Automatic Control (IFAC), a Fellow of the American Association for the Advancement of Science (AAAS) and a Fellow of the Chinese Association of Automation (CAA). Zhou is the Founding Editor-in-Chief of the IEEE/Wiley Book Series on Systems Science and Engineering and the Editor-in-Chief of the IEEE/CAA Journal of Automatica Sinica. In 2015, he received the Norbert Wiener Award for "fundamental contributions to the area of Petri net theory and applications to discrete event systems," from the IEEE Systems, Man, and Cybernetics Society which also awarded him the Franklin V. Taylor Memorial Award for Best Paper award in 2010. In 2000, Zhou received the Humboldt Research Award for US Senior Scientists, Alexander von Humboldt Foundation, Germany. In 1994, he received the Society of Manufacturing Engineers, Computer-Integrated Manufacturing UNIVERSITY-LEAD Award (Leadership and Excellence in the Application and Development of integrated manufacturing). The number of his publications receiving 200 or more citations is 24 according to Google Scholar. He is one of the world's Highly Cited Researchers in Web of Science and has a total of more than 34,000 citations with an h- index of 89.

== Education ==
Zhou earned his Ph.D. in Computer & Systems Engineering, Rensselaer Polytechnic Institute, Troy, NY, 1990. He completed his M. S. in Automatic Control, Beijing Institute of Technology, Beijing, China, 1986 following the completion of his B. S. in Control Engineering, Nanjing University of Science & Technology, Nanjing, China, 1983.

== Career ==
In 2000, Zhou joined the faculty of New Jersey Institute of Technology where in 2013, Zhou became a distinguished professor at The Helen and John C. Hartmann Department of Electrical and Computer Engineering at the New Jersey Institute of Technology. There, he serves as researcher of Petri Nets and their applications, director of the M.S. Program in Power and Energy Systems, director of the M.S. Program in Computer Engineering, director of Discrete Event Systems Laboratory, director of CRRC-ZIC Laboratory for Rail System Network and Information Technologies, and area coordinator of Intelligent Systems. Previous to his career as a professor, Zhou worked at Beijing Institute of Computer Applications, where he was an assistant engineer responsible for the development of CAD/CAM for vehicles.

== Significant contributions ==
Petri nets are a modeling tool playing the same role in event-driven systems as the differential/difference equations in continuous dynamic systems. As the size and complexity of automated systems increase, ad hoc methods lose their effectiveness, and a strong need arises for systematic methods of analysis and design. Zhou's work is about such methods - including their modeling, analysis, and synthesis of various automated systems.

In 1991, Zhou provided the theoretical basis for Petri net synthesis methods that model systems with shared resources. He formulated two new resource- sharing concepts: parallel mutual exclusion (PME) and sequential mutual exclusion (SME). PME models a resource shared by distinct independent processes. SME is a sequential composition of PMEs, modeling a resource shared by sequentially related processes. Zhou derived the conditions under which a net containing such structures will not have a total system shut down (deadlock). His approach enabled flexible design of systems that met constraints, and optimized performance. The synthesized models could be converted to supervisory controllers for automated systems. To simplify the optimal control design for any given automated system, his work invented the elementary and dependent siphons of Petri nets - important structural objects for characterizing deadlocks. He also invented several deadlock control methods for automated systems. Their use reduced the structural complexity of supervisory controllers - - they became linear with respect to system size. For certain systems, optimal controllers were developed with polynomially complex algorithms, thereby allowing for the first time, on- line deployment of optimal control methods. Thousands of researchers and engineers use his methods in various applications for automated system design, analysis, and control. Factories which use Zhou’s methods are thereby able to both prevent deadlock and simultaneously operate at maximum productivity - a rare combination in complex automated systems.

Zhou was among the pioneers of Petri net- based methods for semiconductor manufacturing, in particular, robotic cells called cluster tools, widely used in today’s semiconductor wafer fabrication plants. His survey- type papers popularized and greatly increased acceptance of Petri nets in system designs and applications (e.g., work published in IEEE Transactions on Industrial Electronics, IEEE Transactions on Semiconductor Manufacturing, IEEE Transactions on Automation Science and Engineering, and IEEE Robotics and Automation Magaz ine). Several of his patents have been licensed to dozens of industrial firms and put into industrial use, generating significant economic outcomes. Helping substantially improve the productivity of manufacturing semiconductor wafers and chips, this has a direct impact on lowering manufacturing costs and significantly increasing bottom line profitability in the semiconductor manufacturing industry.

Zhou has made contributions to the advancement of Petri net theory and their applications in automated systems. He has published over 400 papers in IEEE Transactions and Journals (majority being regular papers) and over 100 in other journals. He has authored/coathored 12 patents, 12 books, 29 book chapters and over 300 conference- proceeding papers. He is the world’s most cited researcher on Petri nets, and one of the overall leading researchers in automated manufacturing systems (Scopus). Web of Science ranked Zhou in 2012 as the number one most highly cited scholar in engineering worldwide and has listed him as a "highly cited scholar" in engineering since then. His recognition includes four Fellow designations - by IEEE for contributions to Petri nets and their applications; by AAAS for distinguished contributions to Petri nets, discrete event systems, and their applications to manufacturing, transportation, workflow, disassembly, web services, and software design; by the International Federation of Automatic Control (IFAC) for seminal contributions to the theory of Petri nets and their application in manufacturing, transportation, and web services; and by Chinese Association of Automation for contributions to the field of automation.

== Honors and awards ==
- 2019: Overseers Excellence in Research Prize and Medal, New Jersey Institute of Technology
- 2018: Outstanding Researcher Award, Newark College of Engineering, New Jersey Institute of Technology
- 2018: M. Ghahramani, M. C. Zhou (advisor) and C. T. Hon, “Spatio-temporal analysis of mobile phone data for interaction recognition,” in Proc. of 2018 IEEE 15th International Conference on Networking, Sensing and Control (ICNSC), Zhuhai, China, March 27–29, 2018 (Best Student Paper Award)
- 2017: Fellow, Chinese Association of Automation (CAA)
- 2016: Highly cited scholar in engineering by Web of Science/Clarivate Analytics
- 2016: Best Paper Award, J. Q. Zhang, S. W. Zhu, D. Zang and M. C. Zhou “A Sliding Window Method for Online Tracking of Spatiotemporal Event Patterns” In the 9th International Conference on Internet and Distributed Computing Systems (IDCS 2016), September 28–30, 2016, Wuhan, China.
- 2016: Outstanding Support for the Mission of the IEEE, MGA, Region 1 and Section Award (For outstanding contributions to the IEEE North Jersey Section and its SMC Chapter)
- 2016: Third Prize of the 12th Philosophy and Social Science Outstanding Achievement Award of Shaanxi Province, China, “ε-Constraint and fuzzy logic-based optimization of hazardous material transportation via lane reservation,” by Z. Zhou, F. Chu, A. Che, M. Zhou, in IEEE Transactions on Intelligent Transportation Systems, 2013, 14(2): 847-857.
- 2015: Highly cited scholar in engineering by Web of Science/Thomson Reuters
- 2015: Norbert Wiener Award for “fundamental contributions to the area of Petri net theory and applications to discrete event systems,” IEEE Systems, Man, and Cybernetics Society
- 2015: Best Conference Paper Award, J. Li, X. Meng and M. C. Zhou, “Job Scheduling and Collision Resolution of Multi-Bridge Processing Systems,” in Proc. 2015 IEEE Int. Conf. on Networking, Sensing and Control, Taipei, Taiwan, April 9–11, 2015
- 2014: Highly cited scholar in engineering by Web of Science/Thomson Reuters
- 2014: Fellow of International Federation of Automatic Control (IFAC) (For seminal contributions to the theory of Petri nets and their application in manufacturing, transportation, and web services).
- 2013: Distinguished Service Award, IEEE Robotics and Automation Society, May 2013.
- 2012: Top one of 2012 most highly cited scholars in engineering globally by Web of Science/Thomson Reuters
- 2012: Lifetime Contribution and Leadership Award, Chinese Association for Science & Technology – USA, 2012
- 2012: Saul K. Fenster Innovation in Engineering Education Award, Newark College of Engineering, New Jersey Institute of Technology
- 2012: Best Student Paper Award, “Real-Time Control Policy for Single-Arm Cluster Tools with Residency Time Constraints and Activity Time Variation by Using Petri Net,” by Y. Qiao, N. Wu (Faculty Advisor) and M. C. Zhou (Faculty Co-Advisor) in Proc. 2012 IEEE Int. Conf. on Networking, Sensing and Control, pp. 34–39, Beijing, China, April 11–14, 2012.
- 2011: Fellow, American Association for the Advancement of Science (AAAS) for distinguished contributions to the field of Petri nets, discrete event systems, and their applications to manufacturing, transportation, workflow, disassembly, web services, and software design.
- 2011: QSI Best Application Paper Award Finalist, for the paper "Modeling and Analysis of Dual-Arm Cluster Tools for Wafer Fabrication with Revisiting," by Y. Qiao, N. Wu, and M. C. Zhou, 2011 IEEE International Conference on Automation Science and Engineering, pp. 90–95, Trieste, Italy, August 24–27, 2011.
- 2010: Franklin V. Taylor Memorial Award, IEEE Systems, Man, and Cybernetics Society.
- 2009: The third top recruiter of IEEE members in the Northeastern USA Region
- 2008: Faculty advisor of the 1st Prize of IEEE North Jersey Section Graduate Student Contest, “Automatic Tracing of Blood Flow Velocity in Ultrasound Doppler Images” by Zhe Wang (Doctoral student), April 2008.
- 2007: Chang Jiang Scholars Program Award, PRC Ministry of Education.
- 2006: Marquis Who's Who in American Education, 2006-2007 Edition
- 2006: Faculty Advisor of Best Poster Presentation, "Ad Hoc Networking and its security applications" by Raul Garcia, XVII Undergraduate Research Symposium, sponsored by NSF and Universidad Metropolitana, San Juan, Puerto Rico, September 15–16, 2006.
- 2006: Outstanding Contribution Award, WOCC (Wireless and Optical Communication Conference) Inc., Oct. 2006.
- 2005: Outstanding Contribution Award, IEEE Systems, Man and Cybernetics Society
- 2005: Who’s Who in Science and Engineering (Marquis Who’s Who), 8th Edition
- 2005: Faculty Advisor of The Best Student Poster Award, The 13th Wireless and Optical Communication Conference, Newark, NJ, "Hybrid Networks: Cellular-Relay Architecture" by Zhigang Wang (doctoral student), April 22–23, 2005.
- 2005: Faculty Advisor of The Best Student Poster Award, 2005 CAST-GNY Annual Convention, New York City, "Optimal Tracking Interval for Predictive Tracking in Wireless Sensor Network " by Zhen Guo (doctoral student), June 18, 2005.
- 2005-2011: Distinguished Lecturer, IEEE Systems, Man and Cybernetics Society.
- 2005: “Semiconductor Manufacturing Automation” - Most Active Technical Committee Award, IEEE Robotics and Automation Society.
- 2004: Outstanding Contribution Award, IEEE Systems, Man and Cybernetics Society
- 2004: Faculty advisor of the 1st Place of Doctoral Student Paper Competition, “Cluster Water and Biosignal Networks,” by Jingong Pan (Doctoral student), Annual Convention of Chinese Institute of Engineers-USA, Newark, NJ, September 2004.
- 2003: Overseas Expert Panelist, The Chinese Academy of Sciences
- 2003: Fellow, Institute of Electrical and Electronics Engineers (IEEE) (for contributions to Petri nets and their applications)
- 2003: Faculty advisor of Best Student Technical Paper Award, “Product Sustainability Improvement Based on Performance of Product Components,” by M. Gao, and M. C. Zhou, Proceeding of the 2003 IEEE International Symposium on Electronics and the Environment & the IAER Electronics Recycling Summit, Boston, MA, May 2003.
- 2002: Faculty advisor of the 3rd Prize of IEEE North Jersey Section Graduate Student Contest, “3D Warping in Plastic Surgery Planning,” by Congzhe Zhang (Doctoral student), April 2002.
- 2002: Faculty advisor of the 1st Prize of Student Paper Presentation Contest sponsored by Chinese Institute of Engineers-USA/Greater New York Chapter, “Securing Ad hoc On-Demand Distance Vector Routing Protocol,” by Congzhe Zhang (Doctoral student), August 2002.
- 2001: Outstanding Scientists of the 21st Century, 1st Ed., International Biographical Centre, Cambridge, UK.
- 2001: Faculty advisor of the 1st Prize of IEEE North Jersey Section Graduate Student Contest, “A systematic approach for disassembly line design,” by Ying Tang (Doctoral student); and the 3rd Prize “Fuzzy Reasoning Petri Nets,” by Meimei Gao (Doctoral student).
- 2001: Asian American Achievement Award in the category of Professional and Academic Achievements, Asian American Heritage Council of New Jersey.
- 2001: Academic Achievement Award, Chinese Association for Science & Technology – USA.
- 2000: Who’s Who in Science and Engineering (Marquis Who’s Who), 5th Edition
- 2000: The Kayamori Best Paper Award Finalist, 2000 IEEE International Conference on Robotics and Automation, San Francisco, CA, IEEE Robotics and Automation Society.
- 2000: The Best Student Paper Award for the paper “A fuzzy logic-based lifecycle comparison of digital and film cameras” by B. Yang (Student), Y. Luo (Student), and M. C. Zhou (Faculty Advisor), 2000 IEEE International Symposium on Electronics and the Environment, San Francisco, CA, May 8–10, 2000.
- 2000: The Best Student Paper Award for the paper Design of virtual production lines in back-end semiconductor manufacturing systems” by Tang, Y. (Student), M. C. Zhou (Faculty Advisor), and R. Qiu, Proc. 2000 IEEE Int. Conf. on Systems, Man, and Cybernetics, Nashville, TN, pp. 1733–1738, Oct. 8-11, 2000.
- 2000 Humboldt Research Award for US Senior Scientists, Alexander von Humboldt Foundation, Germany
- 2000: Leadership Award, Chinese Association for Science & Technology - USA
- 1999: Franklin V. Taylor Best Paper Award Finalist, IEEE Systems, Man, and Cybernetics Society
- 1998: National Science Foundation Alan T. Waterman Award Nominee
- 1997: Honorary Research Professor, Nanjing University of Science and Technology
- 1996: Harlan J. Perlis Award for Research, New Jersey Institute of Technology
- 1994: National Science Foundation Research Initiation Award
- 1994: Computer-Integrated Manufacturing UNIVERSITY-LEAD Award by Society of Manufacturing Engineers (LEAD=Leadership and Excellence in the Application and Development of integrated manufacturing)
- 1994: Outstanding Service Award by Chinese Association for Science & Technology - USA
- 1993 & 1994: National Science Foundation Young Investigator Nominee
- 1991: Engineering Foundation Research Initiation Award
