= Jian-Kang Zhu =

Researcher

- Born: October 1, 1967 (age 59)
- Occupation: Plant scientist

Academic background
- Education: Beijing Agricultural University; University of California; Purdue University

Jian-Kang Zhu is a plant scientist, researcher and academic. He has served as the President of Macau University of Science and Technology since January 2026.

Prior to this, he was a senior principal investigator in the Shanghai center for plant stress biology, Chinese Academy of Sciences (CAS).

Zhu is known for his research in plant stress biology, epigenetics and gene editing. He has published over 400 research articles, and is one of the most cited scientists in life sciences. He has several patents for improving plant stress tolerance issued by many countries.

Zhu is a fellow of the American Association for the Advancement of Science. In 2010, he was elected as a member of the US National Academy of Sciences.

== Education ==
Zhu received a B.S. in soils and agricultural chemistry in 1987 from Beijing Agricultural University. After one year as a graduate student in Peking University, he moved to the United States, where he joined the University of California, Riverside for his M.S. in botany. After completing his M.S. in 1990, Zhu received a Ph.D. in plant physiology from Purdue University in 1993. He completed his postdoctoral training at Rockefeller University.

== Career ==
Zhu taught briefly at Auburn University in 1995 before joining University of Arizona, where he became associate professor in 1999 and full professor in 2000. In 2004, he left University of Arizona to join University of California, Riverside, as the Presidential Chair Professor in the Department of Botany and Plant Sciences. He became the Jane Johnson Chair Professor at UC Riverside in 2007. From 2004 to 2006, he served as the Director of UC Riverside's Institute for Integrative Genome Biology.

From 2010 through 2020, Zhu joined Purdue University as Distinguished Professor in the Department of Horticulture and Landscape Architecture, and Department of Biochemistry. From 2009 to 2011, he served as the founding Director of Plant Stress Genomics Research Center at King Abdullah University of Science and Technology. In 2017, he became the Academic Director of Shanghai Institute of Plant Physiology and Ecology, Chinese Academy of Sciences.

Zhu has been a member of the editorial board or editorial advisory board of National Science Review since 2013, of Molecular Plant since 2012, of Science China Life Sciences since 2008, and of The Plant Journal 2001–2007. He was a Monitoring Editor (2000-2003) and then Associate Editor (2004-2005) of Plant Physiology, an Associate Editor of Plant Molecular Biology (2000-2015), and of Molecular Genetics and Genomics (2005-2010).

Zhu co-founded FuturaGene in 2002 and served as a scientific advisor for the company until 2008. In 2007, he co-founded D-Helix and continues to serve as a scientific advisor.

In 2012, Zhu established the Shanghai Center for Plant Stress Biology (PSC), which is an international research institute within the Chinese Academy of Sciences. It works to address fundamental questions of plant biology to improve agricultural productivity and sustainability and to mitigate agriculture-related environmental degradation.

Zhu has served as the President of Macau University of Science and Technology since January 2026.

== Research and work ==
Zhu is known for his research on plant stress signaling pathways, epigenetic mechanisms of gene regulation, and precise gene editing technologies in plants.

In the early 2000s, Zhu's lab discovered the Salt Overly Sensitive (SOS) signaling pathway that plays a central role in ion homeostasis and salt tolerance in plants. Zhu's lab discovered several important components of abscisic acid (ABA) biosynthesis and signaling pathways, and achieved for the first time the in vitro reconstitution of the core ABA signaling pathway. They also discovered that the Target of Rapamycin (TOR) growth promotion pathway represses ABA signaling and stress responses in unstressed conditions, whereas ABA signaling represses the TOR pathway and growth during times of stress. This discovery revealed a core mechanism through which plants balance growth and stress response and is therefore important for the efforts to breed environment resilient but high yielding crops. Zhu's lab discovered ABA-mimicking small chemicals that can be applied to plants to activate the ABA pathway to reduce transpirational water loss and to induce the expression of drought responsive genes, thus leading to drought resistance in plants. These chemicals are easy to synthesize, are non-toxic, and much less expensive and more stable than ABA, thus have potential for applications in agriculture, turfgrass and horticultural industries to protect plants from drought stress and benefit the environment by reducing the depletion of available freshwater resources. They also identified several regulatory factors for plant cold stress response. In addition, they discovered a number of plant miRNAs and siRNAs, and elucidated their function in regulating plant stress responses.

In epigenetics, Zhu's lab discovered the Arabidopsis 5-methylcytosine DNA glycosylase/lyase ROS1 in 2002. ROS1 is the first DNA demethylase (the enzyme initiating active DNA demethylation) established with genetic and biochemical evidence. It initiates a base-excision repair pathway for active DNA demethylation to erase DNA methylation marks and to prevent DNA methylation-mediated gene silencing. Zhu's lab has found nearly all of the enzymes in the biochemical pathway for active DNA demethylation in plants. They have also identified the first known eukaryotic protein complex that functions in regulating active DNA demethylation, which is important for understanding of the targeting of DNA demethylase for precise control of DNA methylation reprogramming during development, stress responses, aging and diseases including cancer. Furthermore, they discovered several important components of the RNA-directed DNA methylation (RdDM) pathway that controls de novo DNA methylation in plants, and proposed the concept of a methylstat that senses and balances genome-wide DNA methylation and demethylation activities.

From the year 2010, Zhu's lab has been developing efficient methods for precise gene editing in plants using TALE nucleases and CRISPR/Cas. They developed the first efficient gene targeting method for the model plant Arabidopsis. They have also developed an elegant tandem repeat-HDR (homology-directed repair) approach for efficient sequence insertion and replacement in rice, which is important for crop functional genomics research and breeding.

== Awards and honors ==
- 1994 - Life Sciences Research Foundation Fellow
- 2002 - Researcher of the Year, College of Agriculture and Life Sciences, University of Arizona
- 2003 - Charles Albert Shull Award, American Society of Plant Biologists
- 2004 - Fellow of the American Association for the Advancement of Science
- 2005 - Distinguished Agricultural Alumni Award, Purdue University
- 2008 - Most cited plant scientist in the USA during 1997-2007 by Thomson Reuters
- 2010 - Member of the US National Academy of Sciences
- 2016 - The Herbert Newby McCoy Award
- 2011–present - Highly Cited Researcher as reported by Clarivate Analytics
- Recognized as a Pioneer Member of the American Society of Plant Biologists.

== Selected publications ==
- Zhu JK. 2002. Salt and drought stress signal transduction in plants. Annu Rev Plant Biol. 53:247-273.
- Hasegawa PM, Bressan RA, Zhu JK, Bohnert HJ. 2000. Plant cellular and molecular responses to high salinity. Annu Rev Plant Physiol Plant Mol Biol. 51:463-499.
- Zhu JK. 2001. Plant salt tolerance. Trends Plant Sci. 6:66-71.
- Xiong L, Schumaker KS, Zhu JK. 2002. Cell signaling during cold, drought, and salt stress. Plant Cell 14:S165-S183.
- Zhu JK. 2003. Regulation of ion homeostasis under salt stress. Curr Opin Plant Biol. 6:441-445.
- Miki D, Zhang W, Zeng W, Feng Z, Zhu JK. 2018. CRISPR/Cas9-mediated gene targeting in Arabidopsis using sequential transformation. Nature Commun. 9(1):1967. doi: 10.1038/s41467-018-04416-0.
- Wang P, Zhao Y, Li Z, Hsu CC, Liu X, Fu L, Hou YJ, Du Y, Xie S, Zhang C, Gao J, Cao M, Huang X, Zhu Y, Tang K, Wang X, Tao WA, Xiong Y, Zhu JK. 2018. Reciprocal Regulation of the TOR Kinase and ABA Receptor Balances Plant Growth and Stress Response. Mol Cell. 69:100-112.
- Cao MJ, Zhang YL, Liu X, Huang H, Zhou XE, Wang WL, Zeng A, Zhao CZ, Si T, Du J, Wu WW, Wang FX, Xu HE, Zhu JK. 2017. Combining chemical and genetic approaches to increase drought resistance in plants. Nat Commun. 8:1183.
- Zhu JK. 2016. Abiotic Stress Signaling and Responses in Plants. Cell. 167:313-324.
- Lei M, Zhang H, Julian R, Tang K, Xie S, Zhu JK. 2015. Regulatory link between DNA methylation and active demethylation in Arabidopsis. Proc Natl Acad Sci U S A. 112:3553-3557.
- Lang Z, Lei M, Wang X, Tang K, Miki D, Zhang H, Mangrauthia SK, Liu W, Ma G, Yan J, Duan CG, Hsu CC, Wang C, Tao WA, Gong Z, Zhu JK. 2015. The methyl-CpG-binding protein MBD7 prevents DNA hypermethylation and transcriptional gene silencing by facilitating active DNA demethylation. Mol Cell. 57:971-983.
- Qian W, Miki D, Zhang H, Liu Y, Zhang X, Tang K, Kan Y, La H, Li X, Li S, Zhu X, Shi X, Zhang K, Pontes O, Chen X, Liu R, Gong Z, Zhu JK. 2012. A histone acetyltransferase regulates active DNA demethylation in Arabidopsis. Science 336:1445-1448.
- Mahfouz MM, Li L, Shamimuzzaman M, Wibowo A, Fang X, Zhu JK. 2011. De novo-engineered transcription activator-like effector (TALE) hybrid nuclease with novel DNA binding specificity creates double-strand breaks. Proc. Natl. Acad. Sci. U S A. 108:2623-2628.
- He XJ, Chen T, Zhu JK. 2011. Regulation and function of DNA methylation in plants and animals. Cell Res. 21:442-465.
- Gao Z, Liu HL, Daxinger L, Pontes O, He X, Qian W, Lin H, Xie M, Lorkovic ZJ, Zhang S, Miki D, Zhan X, Pontier D, Lagrange T, Jin H, Matzke AJ, Matzke M, Pikaard CS, Zhu JK. 2010. An RNA polymerase II- and AGO4-associated protein acts in RNA-directed DNA methylation. Nature 465:106-109.
- Fujii H, Chinnusamy V, Rodrigues A, Rubio S, Antoni R, Park SY, Cutler SR, Sheen J, Rodriguez PL, Zhu JK. 2009. In vitro reconstitution of an abscisic acid signalling pathway. Nature 462:660-664.
- Zhu JK. 2009. Active DNA demethylation mediated by DNA glycosylases. Annu. Rev. Genet. 43:143-166.
- He XJ, Hsu YF, Zhu S, Wierzbicki AT, Pontes O, Pikaard CS, Liu HL, Wang CS, Jin H, Zhu JK. 2009. An effector of RNA-directed DNA methylation in Arabidopsis is an ARGONAUTE 4- and RNA-binding protein. Cell 137:498-508.
- Sunkar R, Zhu JK. 2004. Novel and stress-regulated microRNAs and other small RNAs from Arabidopsis. Plant Cell 2004 16:2001-2019.
- Gong Z, Morales-Ruiz T, Ariza RR, Roldan-Arjona T, David L, Zhu JK. 2002. ROS1, a repressor of transcriptional gene silencing in Arabidopsis, encodes a DNA glycosylase/lyase. Cell 111:803-814.
- Shi H, Ishitani M, Kim C, Zhu JK. 2000. The Arabidopsis thaliana salt tolerance gene SOS1 encodes a putative Na+/H+ antiporter. Proc Natl Acad Sci USA. 97:6896-6901.
- Halfter U, Ishitani M, Zhu JK. 2000. The Arabidopsis SOS2 protein kinase physically interacts with and is activated by the calcium-binding protein SOS3. Proc Natl Acad Sci USA. 97:3735-3740.
- Liu J, Ishitani M, Halfter U, Kim CS, Zhu JK. 2000, The Arabidopsis thaliana SOS2 gene encodes a protein kinase that is required for salt tolerance. Proc Natl Acad Sci USA. 97:3730-3734.
- Liu J, Zhu JK. 1998. A calcium sensor homolog required for plant salt tolerance. Science 280:1943-1945.
- Ishitani, M, Xiong, L, Stevenson, B, Zhu, JK. 1997. Genetic analysis of osmotic and cold stress signal transduction in Arabidopsis thaliana: Interactions and convergence of abscisic acid-dependent and abscisic acid-independent pathways. Plant Cell 9: 1935–1949.
