= Ying Tang =

Chinese-American engineer

Ying (Gina) Tang is a Chinese and American electrical engineer whose research interests include applying discrete-event simulation and bio-inspired heuristics in planning for the disassembly and recycling of manufactured objects, and in analyzing the greenhouse gas emissions of manufacturing processes. She is also known for her development of game-based learning systems at levels ranging from middle school to post-university professionals. She is a professor of electrical and computer engineering at Rowan University in New Jersey. In 2021 she cofounded the International Conference on Cyber-Physical-Social Intelligence (CPSI).

== Education ==
Tang received bachelor's and master's degrees in electrical engineering from Northeastern University (China), in 1996 and 1998 respectively. She completed her Ph.D. in electrical engineering from the New Jersey Institute of Technology. Her 2001 dissertation, Modeling, design and scheduling of computer integrated manufacturing and demanufacturing systems, was supervised by Mengchu Zhou.

== Recognition ==
Tang was the 2025 recipient of the International Federation of Automatic Control TC Award for Outstanding Achievement in Social Computing and Cyber Physical Social Systems. She was named to the 2026 class of IEEE Fellows, "for contributions to modeling and control of manufacturing and low-carbon manufacturing systems for sustainable development".
