= Katherine J. Denby =

British plant scientist

- Education: University of Oxford
- Scientific career
- Fields: Plant science; plant pathology
- Workplaces: University of York
- Thesis: Metabolic regulation of glyoxylate cycle gene expression in higher plants. (1994)

Katherine J. Denby works at University of York, England on plant resistance to disease.

== Early life ==
Katherine J. Denby was awarded a B.Sc. in microbiology from the University of Bristol. She then undertook research in plant science at University of Oxford and was awarded a doctorate in 1994.

== Scientific career ==
Denby is a professor at University of York in the Centre for Novel Agricultural Products. Her research uses a wide range molecular and large-data approaches to understanding plant-pathogen interactions, in both the field and more controlled conditions like vertical farming.

She became editor-in-chief of The Plant Journal from January 2024.

== Publications ==
Denby is the author or co-author of over 50 scientific publications. These include:

- Aled Jones, Sarah Bridle, Katherine Denby and 38 others (2023) Scoping potential routes to UK civil unrest via the food system: Results of a structured expert elicitation. Sustainability 15 issue 20
- Emily Breeze, Elizabeth Harrison, Stuart McHattie ... Katherine Denby and 21 others. (2011) High-resolution temporal profiling of transcripts during Arabidopsis leaf senescence reveals a distinct chronology of processes and regulation. The Plant Cell 23 pp 873–894.
- Daniel J Kliebenstein, Heather C Rowe and Katherine J Denby (2005) Secondary metabolites influence Arabidopsis/Botrytis interactions: variation in host production and pathogen sensitivity. The Plant Journal 44 pp 25–36.
- Ian A Graham, Katherine J Denby and Christopher J Leaver (1994) Carbon catabolite repression regulates glyoxylate cycle gene expression in cucumber. The Plant Cell 6 pp 761–772.
