= Andrew O. Jackson =

American plant virologist (born 1941)

- Born: 1941 (age 83–84) near Enterprise, Alabama, U.S.
- Awards: Ruth Allen Award
- Scientific career
- Fields: Plant virology
- Institutions: University of Arizona, University of Nebraska, Purdue University, University of California Berkeley, John Innes Institute, China Agricultural University, Zhejiang University
- Doctoral advisors: D. J. Samborski and Roland Rohringer

Andrew O. Jackson (born 1941) is an American plant virologist.

== Early life and education ==
Born near Enterprise, Alabama in 1941 on his family's farm. While growing up he observed diseases of insect pests, and roamed through the surrounding countryside with small wild animals, giving him early exposure to organisms which would later become his professional interest.

Jackson graduated with a Bachelor of Science in botany and plant pathology in 1964 from Oklahoma State University, then a Master of Science in plant pathology in 1967 from the same institution. In 1970, Jackson earned a PhD in plant pathology and microbiology from the University of Manitoba under Drs. D. J. Samborski and Roland Rohringer.

== Career and research ==
Immediately in 1970, he took a postdoctoral position in plant virology at University of Arizona.

In 1984, he was recommended by Jack Morris to fill a tenured vacancy at the University of California, Berkeley where Morris was already a professor. Until 1990 they worked together often and become closely associated in their research and publications.

After visiting China in 1998 — Beijing, Hangzhou, and Shanghai — in 2004 Jackson began taking sabbaticals every year for three or four months to China Agricultural University and Zhejiang University as a researcher and lecturer. He continued for the next decade until his retirement in 2014.

== Awards ==
Recipient of the Ruth Allen Award in 2005.

== Selected authored bibliography ==
- Jackson, Andrew O.; Francki, R. I. B.; Zuidema, Douwe (1987). "Biology, Structure, and Replication of Plant Rhabdoviruses". In Wagner, Robert R. (ed.). The Rhabdoviruses. The Viruses. Boston, MA: Springer US. pp. 427–508. ISBN 978-1-4684-7032-1.
- Scholthof, K.B.G.; Scholthof, H.B.; Jackson, Andrew O. (1993-05-01). "Control of Plant Virus Diseases by Pathogen-Derived Resistance in Transgenic Plants". Plant Physiology. 102 (1). American Society of Plant Biologists (OUP): 7–12. doi:10.1104/pp.102.1.7. ISSN 0032-0889. PMC 158740. PMID 12231793.
- Scholthof, H B; Scholthof, K B; Jackson, A O (1995). "Identification of tomato bushy stunt virus host-specific symptom determinants by expression of individual genes from a potato virus X vector". The Plant Cell. 7 (8). American Society of Plant Biologists (OUP): 1157–1172. doi:10.1105/tpc.7.8.1157. ISSN 1040-4651. PMC 160941. PMID 7549478.
- Scholthof, Herman B.; Scholthof, Karen-Beth G.; Jackson, Andrew O. (September 1996). "Plant Virus Gene Vectors for Transient Expression of Foreign Proteins in Plants". Annual Review of Phytopathology. 34 (1). Annual Reviews: 299–323. doi:10.1146/annurev.phyto.34.1.299. ISSN 0066-4286. PMID 15012545.
- Jackson, Andrew O.; Taylor, C. B. (1996-10-01). "Plant-Microbe Interactions: Life and Death at the Interface". The Plant Cell. 8 (10). American Society of Plant Biologists (OUP): 1651—68. doi:10.1105/tpc.8.10.1651. PMC 161305. PMID 12239356.
- Walker, P.J.; Benmansour, A.; Calisher, C.H.; Dietzgen, R.; Fang, R.X.; Jackson, Andrew O.; Kurath, G.; Leong, J.C.; Nadin-Davis, S.; Tesh, R.B.; Tordo, N. (2000). "Family Rhabdoviridae". The seventh report of the international committee for taxonomy of viruses. Western Fisheries Research Center (Academic Press). pp. 563–583.
- Goodin, Michael M.; Dietzgen, Ralf G.; Schichnes, Denise; Ruzin, Steven; Jackson, Andrew O. (2002). "pGD vectors: versatile tools for the expression of green and red fluorescent protein fusions in agroinfiltrated plant leaves". The Plant Journal. 31 (3). Society for Experimental Biology (Wiley): 375–383. doi:10.1046/j.1365-313x.2002.01360.x. ISSN 0960-7412. PMID 12164816.
- Jackson, Andrew O.; Dietzgen, Ralf G.; Goodin, Michael M.; Bragg, Jennifer N.; Deng, Min (2005). "Biology of Plant Rhabdoviruses". Annual Review of Phytopathology. 43 (1). Annual Reviews: 623–660. doi:10.1146/annurev.phyto.43.011205.141136. ISSN 0066-4286. PMID 16078897.
- Jackson, Andrew O.; Lim, Hyoun-Sub; Bragg, Jennifer; Ganesan, Uma; Lee, Mi Yeon (2009). "Hordeivirus Replication, Movement, and Pathogenesis". Annual Review of Phytopathology. 47 (1). Annual Reviews: 385–422. doi:10.1146/annurev-phyto-080508-081733. ISSN 0066-4286. PMID 19400645.
- Verchot-Lubicz, Jeanmarie; Torrance, Lesley; Solovyev, Andrey G.; Morozov, Sergey Yu; Jackson, Andrew O.; Gilmer, David (2010). "Varied Movement Strategies Employed by Triple Gene Block–Encoding Viruses". Molecular Plant-Microbe Interactions. 23 (10). American Phytopathological Society: 1231–1247. doi:10.1094/mpmi-04-10-0086. ISSN 0894-0282. PMID 20831404.
- Adams, M.J.; Heinze, C.; Jackson, Andrew O.; Kreuze, J.F.; Macfarlane, S.A.; Torrance, L. (2011). "Family Virgaviridae". In King, Andrew MQ; Lefkowitz, Elliot; Adams, Michael J.; Carstens, Eric B. (eds.). Virus Taxonomy: Ninth Report of the International Committee on Taxonomy of Viruses. Oxford: ICTV (International Committee on Taxonomy of Viruses) (Elsevier). pp. 1139–1162. ISBN 978-0-12-384684-6. OCLC 767516716.
- Jackson, Andrew O.; Li, Zhenghe (2016-08-04). "Developments in Plant Negative-Strand RNA Virus Reverse Genetics". Annual Review of Phytopathology. 54 (1). Annual Reviews: 469–498. doi:10.1146/annurev-phyto-080615-095909. ISSN 0066-4286. PMID 27359368.
