= Avenida de Almeida Ribeiro =

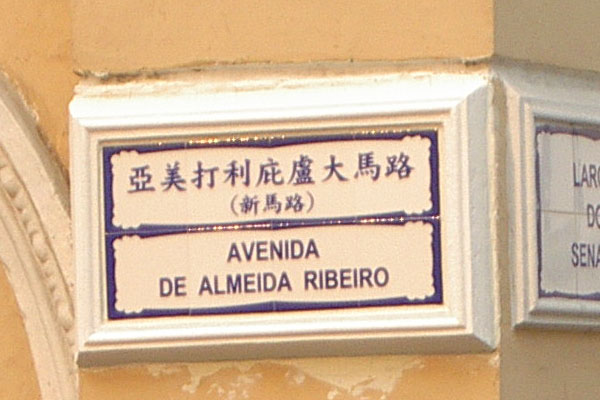
- The street sign of Avenida de Almeida Ribeiro

Chinese name
- Traditional Chinese: 亞美打利庇盧大馬路
- Simplified Chinese: 亚美打利庇卢大马路
Transcriptions
Standard Mandarin
- Hanyu Pinyin: Yàměidá Lìbìlú Dàmǎlù
Yue: Cantonese
- Jyutping: aa^{3} mei^{5} daa^{2} lei^{6} bei^{3} lou^{4} daai^{6} maa^{5} lou^{6}

Alternative Chinese name
- Traditional Chinese: 新馬路
- Simplified Chinese: 新马路
Transcriptions
Standard Mandarin
- Hanyu Pinyin: Xīnmǎlù
Yue: Cantonese
- Jyutping: san^{1} maa^{5} lou^{6}

Portuguese name
- Portuguese: Avenida de Almeida Ribeiro

Avenida de Almeida Ribeiro (Chinese: 亞美打利庇盧大馬路), also commonly known as San Ma Lou (Chinese: 新馬路; "new road"), is the main avenue in the heart of Macau Peninsula. The 620 metres long avenue was laid out in 1920 and it extends from the Inner to the Outer harbour, passing through the old residential area with its rows of colourful street shops.

== History ==
The avenue used to be a small, winding alley. It was not until 1918 that buildings and hills alongside was being altered or demolished for the construction of the avenue. Then being the newest road in the city the widespread San Ma Lou name was given by locals, literally "New Road".

== Shopping area ==
The main shopping belt is marked by the streets of Avenida do Infante Dom Henrique (殷皇子大馬路) and Avenida Almeida Ribeiro, São Domingos Market, Rua da Palha, Rua do Campo (水坑尾街), and Rua Pedro Nolasco da Silva. Nearby, on the lanes around the Rua das Estalagens, is a local flea market, a popular spot to look for Chinese antiques.

From Largo do Senado heading towards the Inner Harbour along the Avenida Almeida Ribeiro, a cluster of jewellery or gold shops can be easily found. Also, antique shops can be seen near St. Paul's, along Avenida Almeida Ribeiro, on Travessa do Pagode and opposite the Kun Lam Temple. Liquors, tobacco, Portuguese wine are largely found in many shops on Avenida de Almeida Ribeiro.

Gambling used to flourish along the avenue but most were relocated to newer, less urbanized regions like Cotai since the 1990s.

== Landmarks ==
Avenida de Almeida Ribeiro hosts a mix of European and Chinese styled buildings along its length, most dated back to the 1920s. Historic landmarks situated there include Largo do Senado, Leal Senado Building, Macau General Post Office and Hotel Central.

== Gallery ==
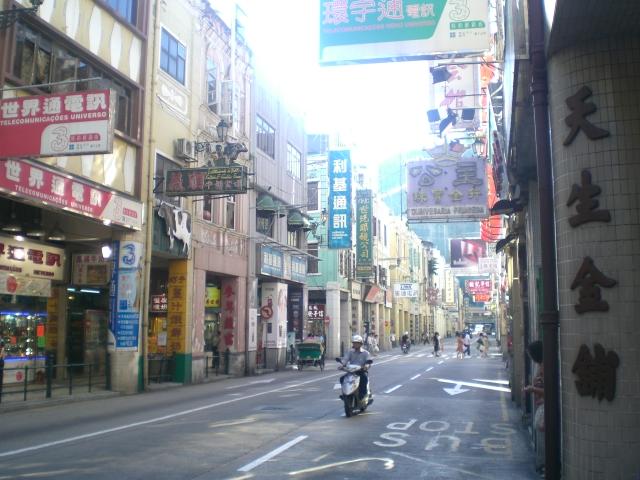
Avenida de Almeida Ribeiro, the main street of Macau Peninsula.

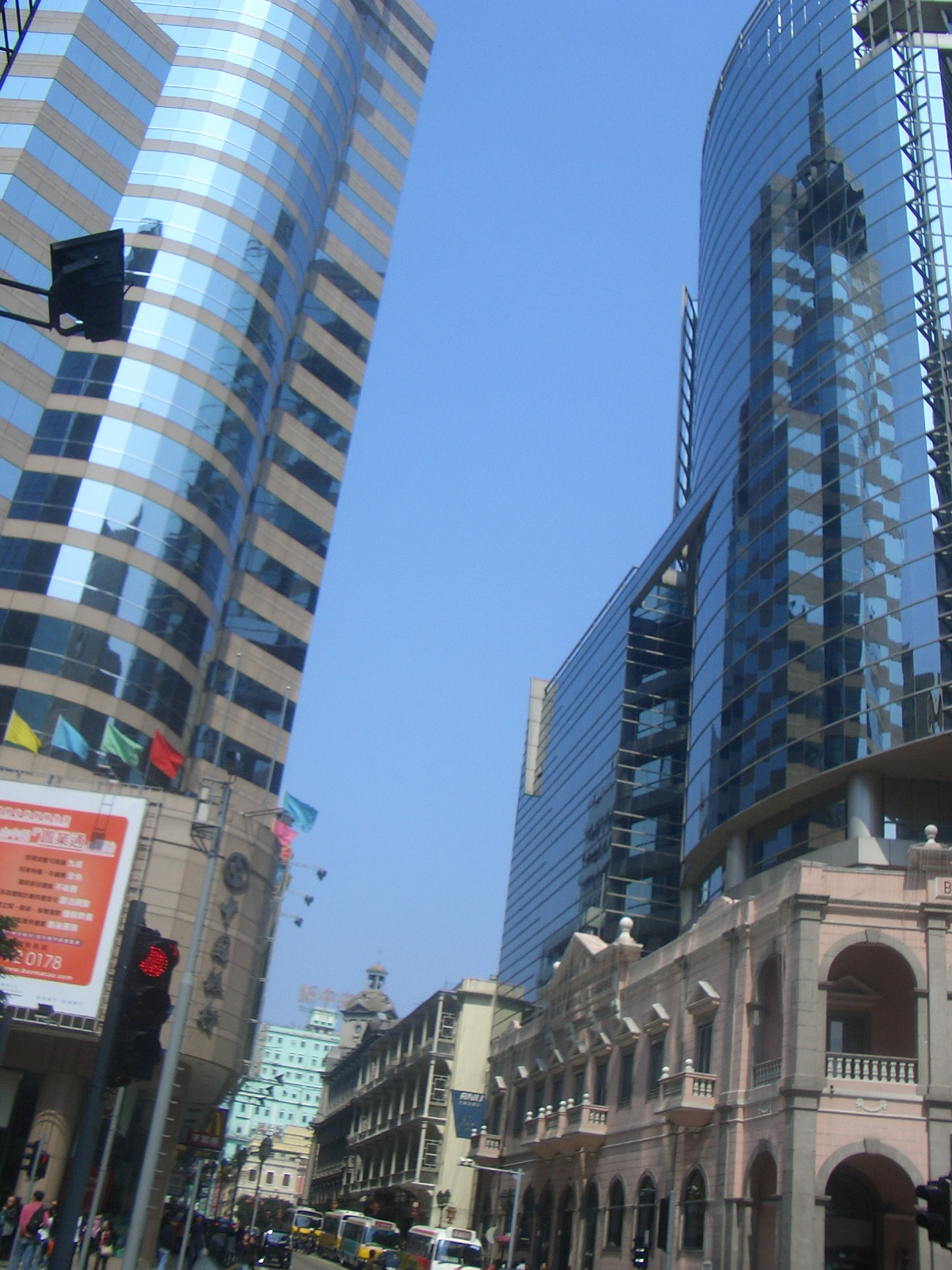
Bank of China (left) and Banco Nacional Ultramarino, two well-known landmarks along Avenida de Almeida Ribeiro.

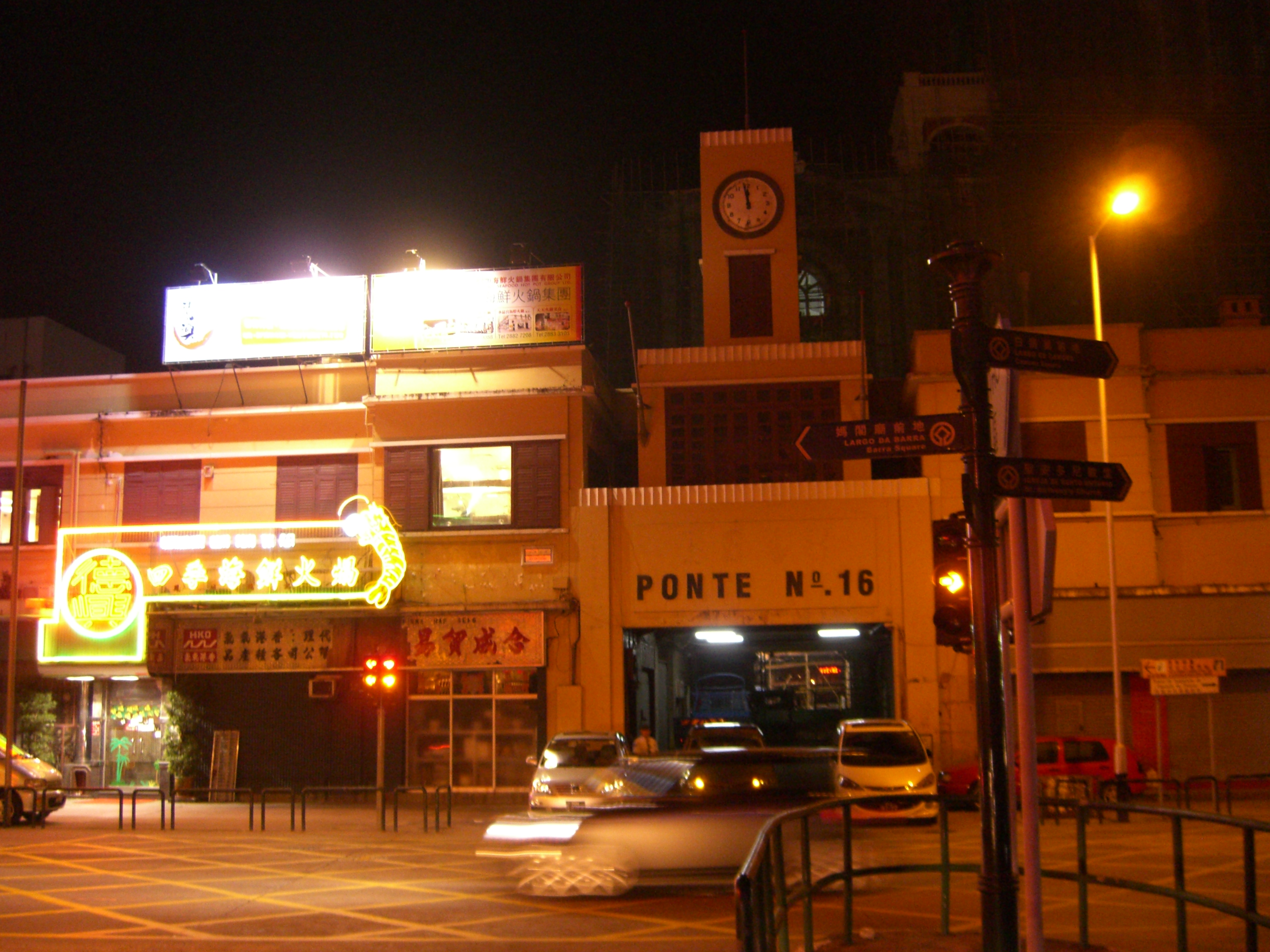
The Ponte 16 site (west end of Avenida de Almeida Ribeiro) is located in the Inner Harbour of Macau's Pier 16, one of the oldest districts in the former Portuguese enclave.

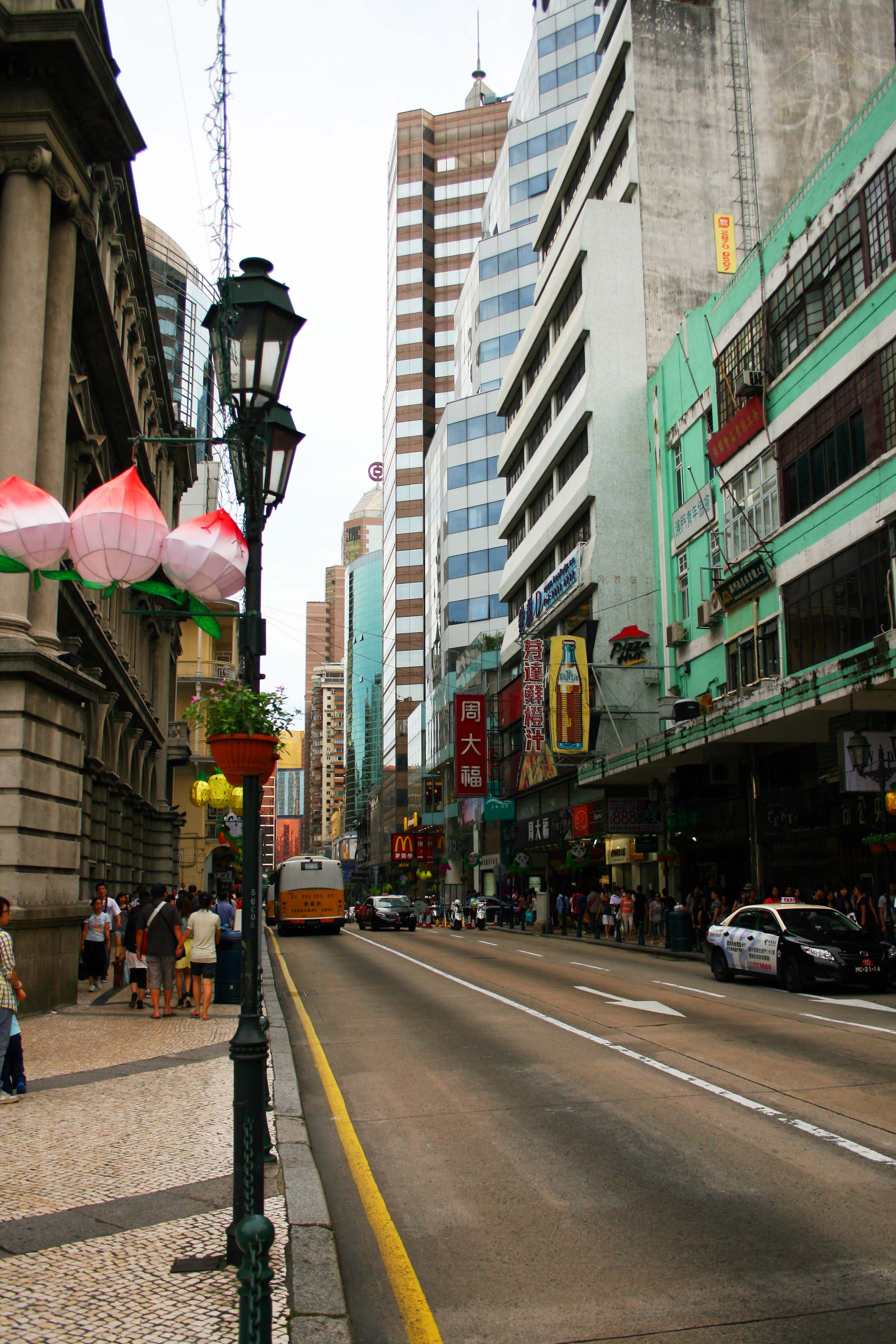
Avenida de Almeida Ribeiro

== See also ==
- Transport in Macau
