= Andrew Jackson (Michigan politician) =

American politician

Member of the Michigan House of Representatives from the Cheboygan County district
- In office January 1, 1879 – 1880
- Preceded by: William McArthur
- Succeeded by: Henry W. Seymour

Personal details
- Born: October 29, 1844 Henry County, Ohio
- Died: July 5, 1899 (aged 54) Sault Sainte Marie, Michigan
- Party: Democratic

Military service
- Branch/service: United States Army (Union Army)
- Years of service: 1861-1863; 1864-1865
- Rank: Brevet Major
- Battles/wars: American Civil War

Andrew Jackson (October 29, 1844 – July 5, 1899) was a Michigan politician and soldier.

== Early life ==
Jackson was born in Henry County, Ohio on October 29, 1844. He graduated from Toledo High School.

== Military career ==
Jackson enlisted in the Union Army in 1861 as part of the 68th Ohio Infantry. From 1861 to 1862, he rose through the ranks becoming second lieutenant in October 1861, then first lieutenant and regimental adjutant in August 1862. He resigned from the army in August 1863 due to wounds he received, but re-enlisted in 1864 as a private in the 147th Ohio Infantry. By the end of the war, Jackson was a brevet major.

== Professional career ==
Sometime between 1872 and 1873, Jackson moved from Louisville, Kentucky to Sault Sainte Marie, Michigan. There, he worked as a contractor for the Soo Locks. On November 5, 1878, he was elected to the Michigan House of Representatives, where he represented the Cheboygan County district from January 1, 1879, to 1880.

== Personal life ==
Jackson married Barbara Shoupe in Tennessee; she died in Piqua, Ohio in 1871, and he remarried on November 9, 1877, to Helen J. Myers, in Sault Sainte Marie, Michigan. They had a daughter on January 6, 1892.

== Death ==
Jackson died in Sault Sainte Marie, Michigan on July 5, 1899, and was interred at Riverside Cemetery in Sault Sainte Marie on July 8, 1899.
