= Macau General Post Office =

Building in Macau, China

Coordinates: 22°11′35.7″N 113°32′24.8″E

- 澳門郵政局大樓; Edificio Sede dos CTT
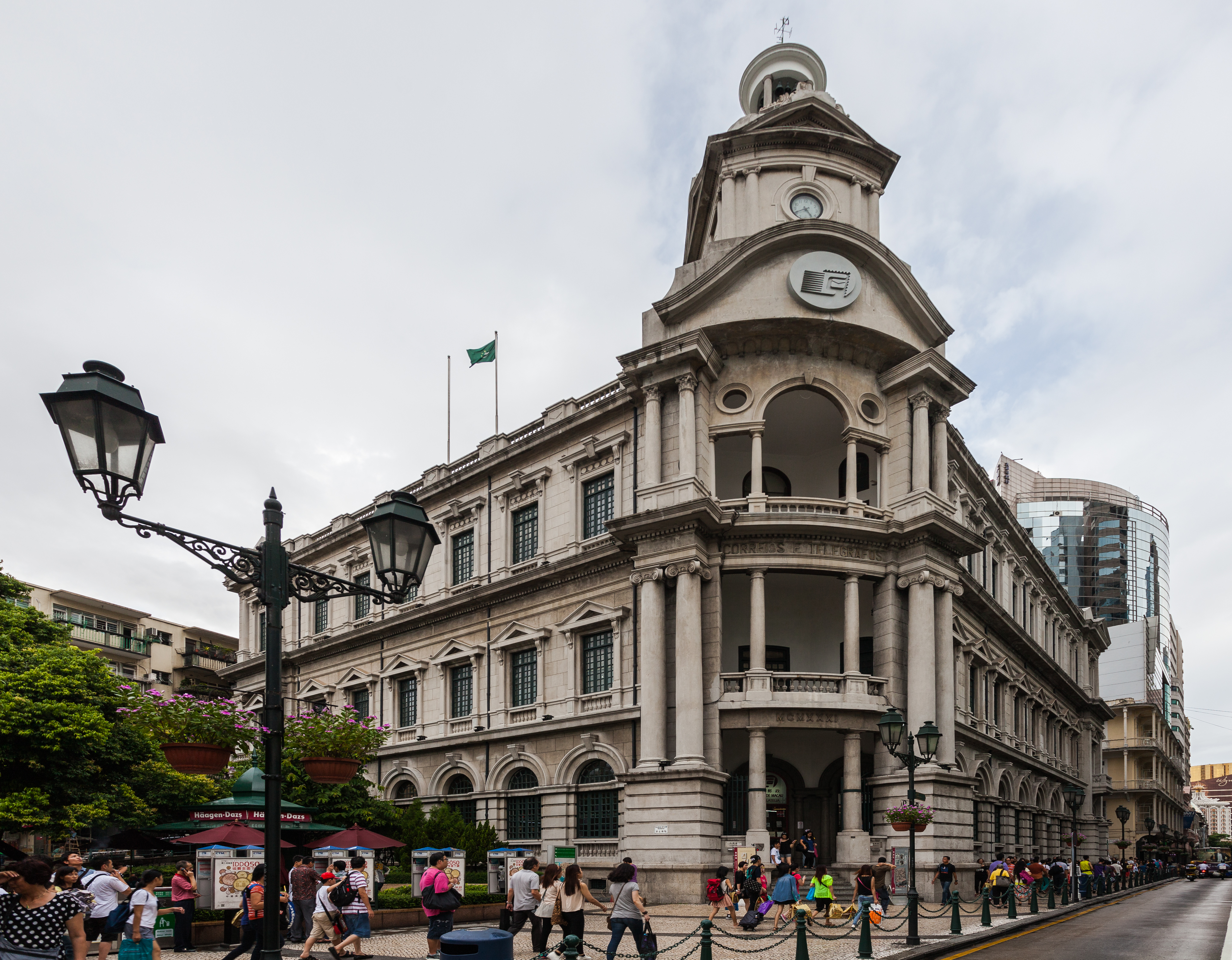
- Interactive map of the Macau General Post Office area

General information
- Type: Post office
- Location: Sé, Macau, China
- Opened: 1929

Technical details
- Floor count: 3

Macau General Post Office

Chinese name
- Traditional Chinese: 澳門郵政局大樓
- Simplified Chinese: 澳门邮政局大楼
Transcriptions
Standard Mandarin
- Hanyu Pinyin: Àomén Yóuzhèngjú Dàlóu
Yue: Cantonese
- Jyutping: ou3 mun4*2 jau4 zing3 guk6*2 daai6 lau4

Portuguese name
- Portuguese: Edificio Sede dos CTT

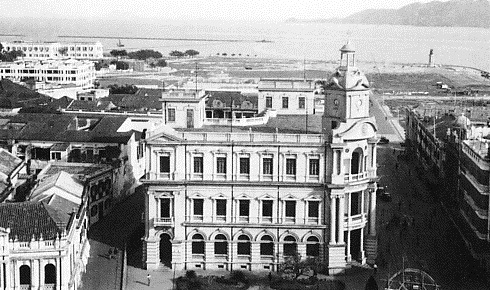
Macau General Post Office Building in c.1950

The Macau General Post Office (Chinese: 澳門郵政局大樓; Portuguese: Edificio Sede dos CTT) is a three-storey building at the intersection of Senado Square and Avenida de Almeida Ribeiro in Sé, Macau, China. The current building was built in 1929.

== See also ==
- CTT (Macau)
