= Historic Centre of Macau =

UNESCO World Heritage Site

UNESCO World Heritage Site
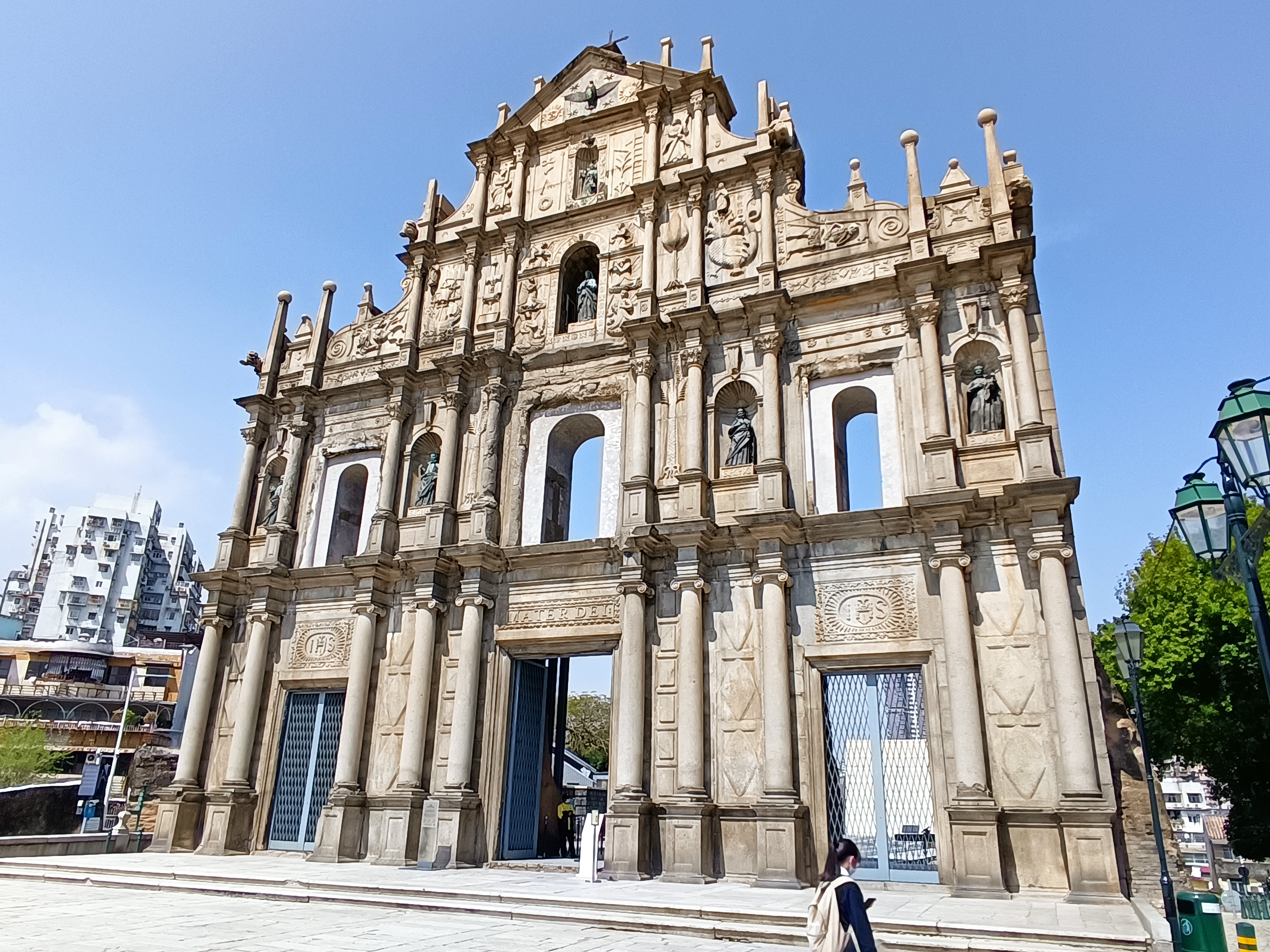
- Ruins of St. Paul's in Macau (Zone 1)

- Location within Guangdong Location within China
- Location: Macau, People's Republic of China
- Includes: Zone 1 (Between Mount Hill and Barra Hill); Zone 2 (Guia Hill)
- Criteria: Cultural: (ii), (iii), (iv), (vi)
- Reference: 1110
- Inscription: 2005 (29th Session)
- Area: 16.1678 ha (39.952 acres)
- Buffer zone: 106.791 ha (263.89 acres)
- Coordinates: 22°11′28.65″N 113°32′11.26″E

The Historic Centre of Macao (Portuguese: Centro Histórico de Macau, Chinese: 澳門歷史城區) is a collection of over twenty locations that witness the unique assimilation and co-existence of Chinese and Portuguese cultures in Macau, a former Portuguese colony. It represents the architectural legacies of the city's cultural heritage, including monuments such as urban squares, streetscapes, churches and temples.

In 2005 the Historic Centre of Macau was inscribed on the UNESCO World Heritage List, making it the 31st designated World Heritage Site in China. It was described by UNESCO as: "with its historic street, residential, religious and public Portuguese and Chinese buildings, the historic centre of Macao provides a unique testimony to the meeting of aesthetic, cultural, architectural and technological influences from East and West," and "...it bears witness to one of the earliest and longest-lasting encounters between China and the West, based on the vibrancy of international trade."

== List of sites ==
The Historic Centre of Macao is made up of two separated core zones in city centre on the Macau peninsula. Each core zone is surrounded by a buffer zone.

=== Zone 1 ===
The narrow-stripped Zone 1 is located between Mount Hill and Barra Hill.

==== Buildings ====
Name	Location	Notes	Photo
A-Ma Temple	Barra Square 22.186111°N 113.531139°E	Built in 1488, the temple is dedicated to Matsu, the goddess of seafarers and fishermen. The name Macau is thought to be derived from the name of the temple.	
Moorish Barracks			
Mandarin's House			
St Lawrence's Church			
St. Joseph's Seminary and Church			
Dom Pedro V Theatre	St. Augustine's Square		
Sir Robert Ho Tung Library	St. Augustine's Square		
St. Augustine's Church	3 St. Augustine's Square		
Leal Senado Building	Senado Square		
Sam Kai Vui Kun (Kuan Tai Temple)	10 Rua Sul do Mercado de São Domingos		
Holy House of Mercy	Senado Square		
Cathedral of the Nativity of Our Lady			
Lou Kau Mansion			
St. Dominic's Church	St. Dominic's Square		
Ruins of St. Paul's			
Na Tcha Temple			
Section of the Old City Walls			
Monte Forte			
St. Anthony's Church			
Casa Garden			
Old Protestant Cemetery and the old headquarters of the British East India Company			

==== Squares ====
Name	Location	Notes	Photo
Barra Square 媽閣廟前地 Largo do Pagode da Barra			
Lilau Square 亞婆井前地; Largo do Lilau			
St. Augustine's Square 崗頂前地; Largo de Santo Agostinho			
Senado Square 議事亭前地; Largo do Senado			
St. Dominic's Square 板樟堂前地; Largo do São Domingos			
Cathedral Square 大堂前地; Largo da Sé			
Company of Jesus Square 耶穌會紀念廣場; Largo da Companhia de Jesus	The square in front of the Ruins of St. Paul's.		
Camoes Square 白鴿巢前地; Praça de Luís de Camões			

=== Zone 2 ===
The Zone is surrounded by a buffer zone that covers a park and immediate urban area.

- Guia Fortress incorporating Guia Chapel and Guia Lighthouse

== Management ==
Most of the items (buildings) are owned by the Macau Special Administrative Region (SAR) and managed by various departments or authority. Cultural Affairs Bureau of the SAR Government manages the Mandarin's House, the Ruins of St. Paul's, the Section of the Old Wall, Mount Fortress and Guia Fortress (includes the Lighthouse and Chapel).

Leal Senado Building is managed by the Municipal Affairs Bureau (IAM) while the two government-owned temples, A-Ma Temple and Na Tcha Temple are managed by the Board of A-Ma Temple Charity Association and management board of Na Tcha Temple respectively. The Moorish Barracks is managed by the Marine and Water Bureau.

The rest of the items are owned and managed by the respective institutions. St. Joseph's Seminary Building and Church is owned by St. Joseph's Seminary and managed by the Catholic Diocese of Macao. The Holy House of Mercy Building is owned and managed by Holy House of Mercy Charitable Foundation. Dom Pedro V Theatre is owned and managed by the management board of Dom Pedro V Theatre.

The nominated buildings of the Historic Centre are protected by various laws, including the Basic Law of the Macao SAR.

== Controversy ==
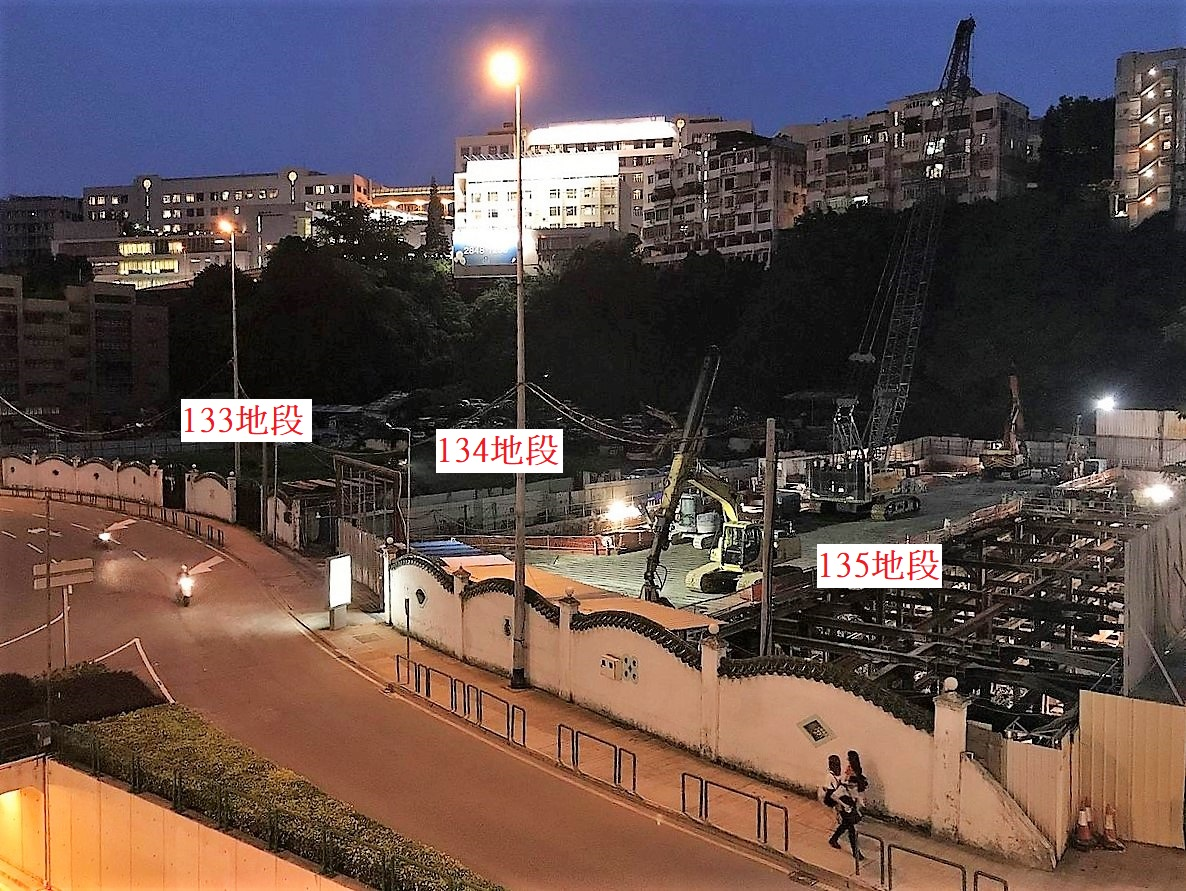
Constructions on the foothill of Guia Hill in 2017.

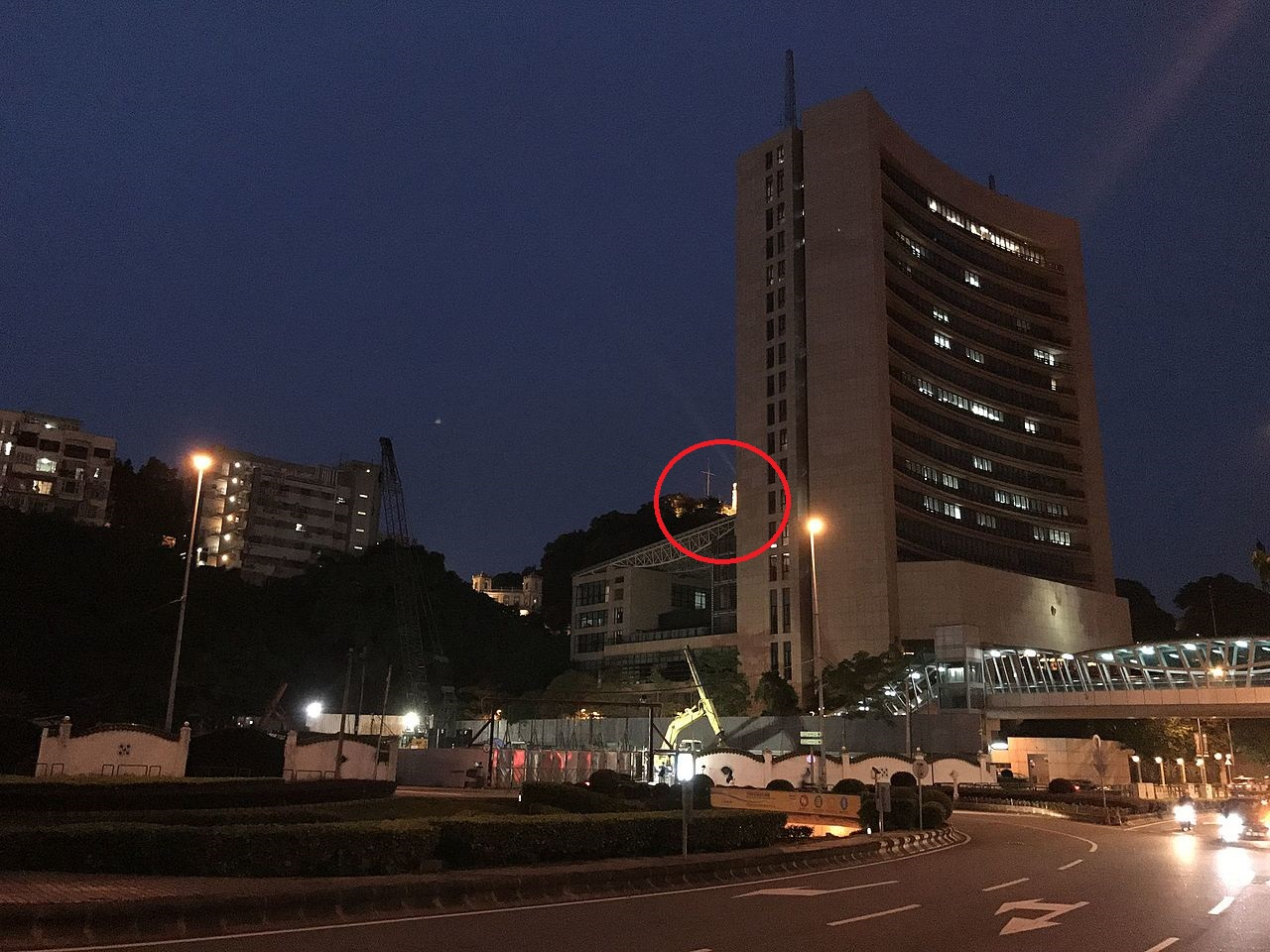
The view of Guia Fortress is blocked by the headquarter.

In 2007, local residents of Macao wrote a letter to UNESCO complaining about construction projects around the World Heritage Site Guia Lighthouse (Focal height 108 meters), including the headquarter of the Macau Liaison Office (91 meters). UNESCO then issued a warning to the Macau government, which led former Chief Executive Edmund Ho to sign a notice regulating height restrictions on buildings around the site.

In 2015, the New Macau Association submitted a report to UNESCO claiming that the government had failed to protect Macao's cultural heritage against threats by urban development projects. One of the main examples in the report is the headquarters of the Liaison Office of the Central People's Government in the Macao Special Administrative Region, which is located on the Guia foothill and obstructs the view of the Guia Fortress (one of the world heritages symbols of Macao). One year later, Roni Amelan, a spokesman from UNESCO Press service, said that the UNESCO has asked China for information and is still waiting for a reply.

In 2016, the Macau government approved an 81-meter construction limit for the residential project, which reportedly goes against the city's regulations on the height of buildings around the World Heritage Site Guia Lighthouse.

Professor at Stanford University Dr. Ming K.Chan (Chinese: 陳明銶) and professor at University of Macau Dr. Eilo Yu (Chinese: 余永逸) commented the Guia Lighthouse case proved that the Macao government had ignored the conservation of heritage in urban planning.

== See also ==
- Classified immovable properties
- List of oldest buildings and structures in Macau
- Religion in Macau
