= Macau University of Science and Technology =

Private university located in Taipa, Macau

- 澳門科技大學; Universidade de Ciência e Tecnologia de Macau
- Other name: MUST
- Motto: 意誠格物 (Chinese)
- Motto in English: Dedication to practical studies, Enhancement of knowledge, Ability and Quality
- Type: Private university
- Established: 2000; 26 years ago
- Academic affiliations: AUAP, IAU, GHMUA
- Chancellor: Liu Chak Wan
- President: Jian-Kang Zhu
- Location: Avenida Wai Long, Taipa, Macau, China; 22.152448°N 113.565364°E
- Campus: Suburban
- Language: English, Chinese, Portuguese
- Colors: Blue and yellow
- Website: must.edu.mo

Chinese name
- Traditional Chinese: 澳門科技大學
- Simplified Chinese: 澳门科技大学
- Cantonese Yale: Oumún Fōgeih Daaihhohk
Transcriptions
Standard Mandarin
- Hanyu Pinyin: Àomén Kējì Dàxué
Yue: Cantonese
- Yale Romanization: Oumún Fōgeih Daaihhohk
- Jyutping: Ou3mun4 Fo1gei6 Daai6hok6
- IPA: [ɔw˧.mun˧˥ fɔ˥.kej˨ taj˨.hɔk̚˨]

Portuguese name
- Portuguese: Universidade de Ciência e Tecnologia de Macau

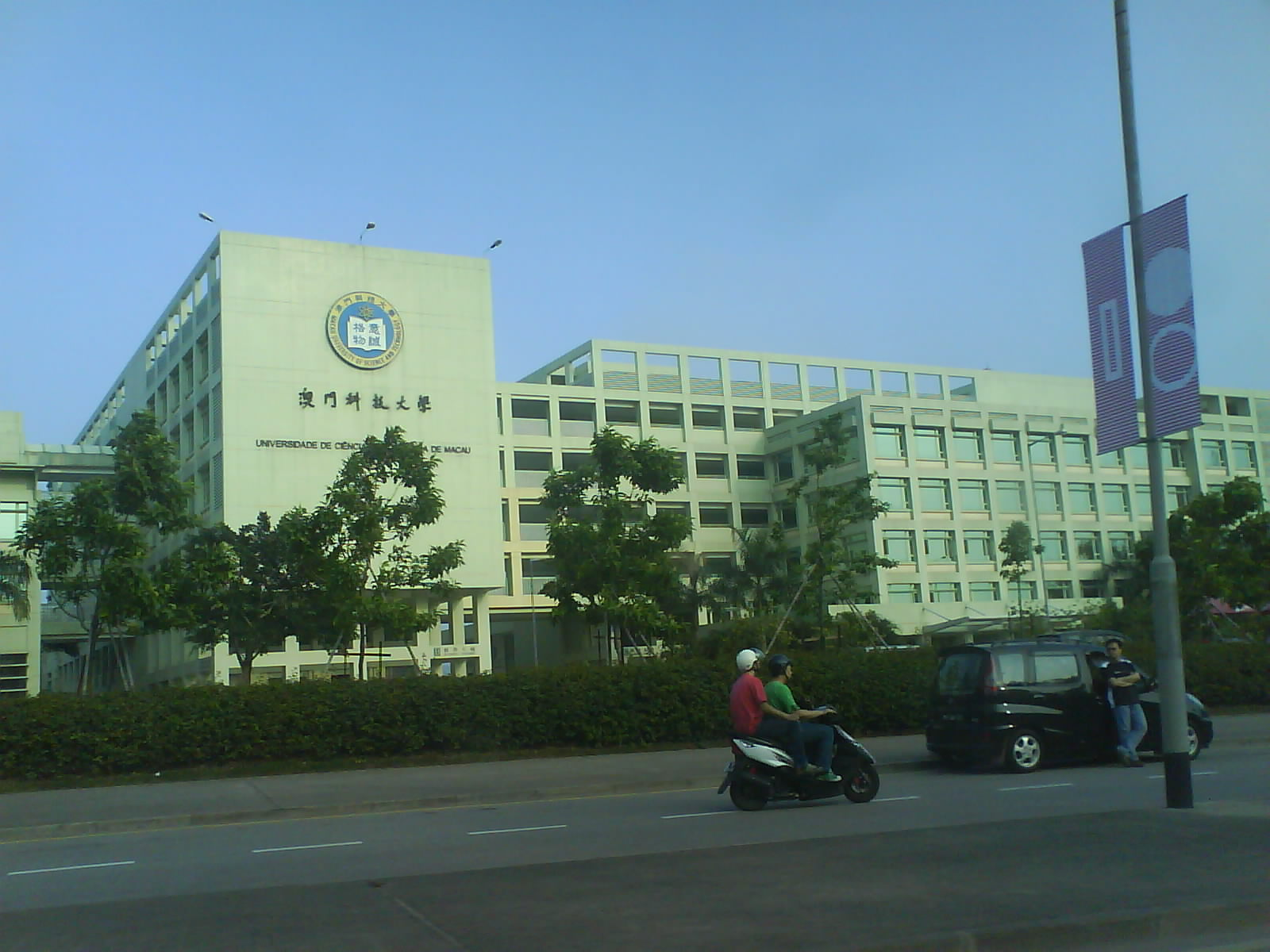
Macau University of Science and Technology

The Macau University of Science and Technology (MUST) is a private university in Taipa, Macau, China.

== History ==
The Macau University of Science and Technology is founded in 2000 at Taipa with a campus size of 0.21 km^{2} (0.081 sq mi). The campus's Block K is the International School of Macao.

The Ministry of Science and Technology of China approved the university's application to use the name State Key Laboratory of Quality Research in Chinese Medicine on January 25, 2011.

The Ministry of Science and Technology of China approved the university's application to use the name State Key Laboratory of Lunar and Planetary Science on October 8, 2018.

== Rankings ==
University rankings

Global – Overall
- ARWU World: 401-500
- QS World: =440 (2026)
- THE World: 251-300

Regional – Overall
- QS Asia: =226 (2025)

- 251-300 in the Times Higher Education World University Rankings 2024
- 35 in the Times Higher Education Asia University Rankings 2023
- 401-500 in the Academic Ranking of World Universities 2023
- 464 in the QS World University Rankings 2025
- 226 in the QS Asian University Rankings 2025
- 17 in the Ranking of Top Universities in Greater China (Mainland China, Taiwan, Hong Kong and Macau) 2020 - Shanghai Ranking's Academic Ranking

== Notable people ==
=== Faculty ===
- Kin Hong Ip, assistant professor of architecture

== See also ==
- List of universities and colleges in Macau
