= Hotel Central =

Hotel in Macau, China

Coordinates: 22°11′39.3″N 113°32′20.8″E

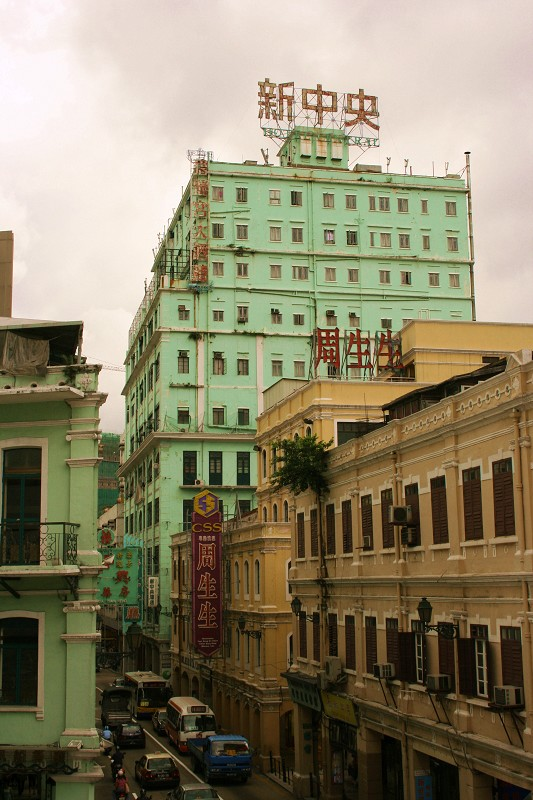
- Hotel Central in 2007
- Chinese: 新中央酒店
Transcriptions
Standard Mandarin
- Hanyu Pinyin: Xīn Zhōngyāng Jiǔdiàn
Yue: Cantonese
- Jyutping: san1 zung1 joeng1 zau2 dim3

President Hotel
- Traditional Chinese: 總統酒店
- Simplified Chinese: 总统酒店
Transcriptions
Standard Mandarin
- Hanyu Pinyin: Zǒngtǒng Jiǔdiàn
Yue: Cantonese
- Jyutping: zung2 tung2 zau2 dim3

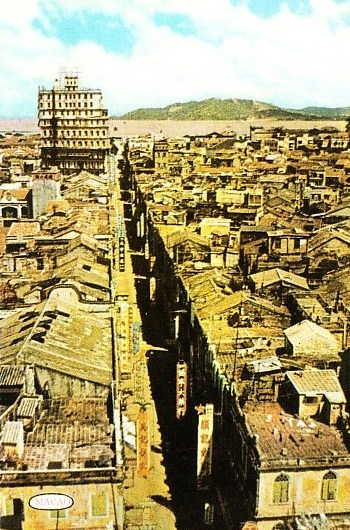
Avenida de Almeida Ribeiro, with the Central Hotel on the left (circa 1955)

Hotel Central (Chinese: 新中央酒店) is an 11-storey hotel on Avenida de Almeida Ribeiro in Sé, Macau. Historically it has also been known as President Hotel (總統酒店). The building was 6 storeys tall in 1928 but, after 5 more floors were added in 1942, became the tallest building in Macau. There were formerly casinos on the fifth and seventh floors of the building. It is also the first building in Macau with elevators.

== Gallery ==
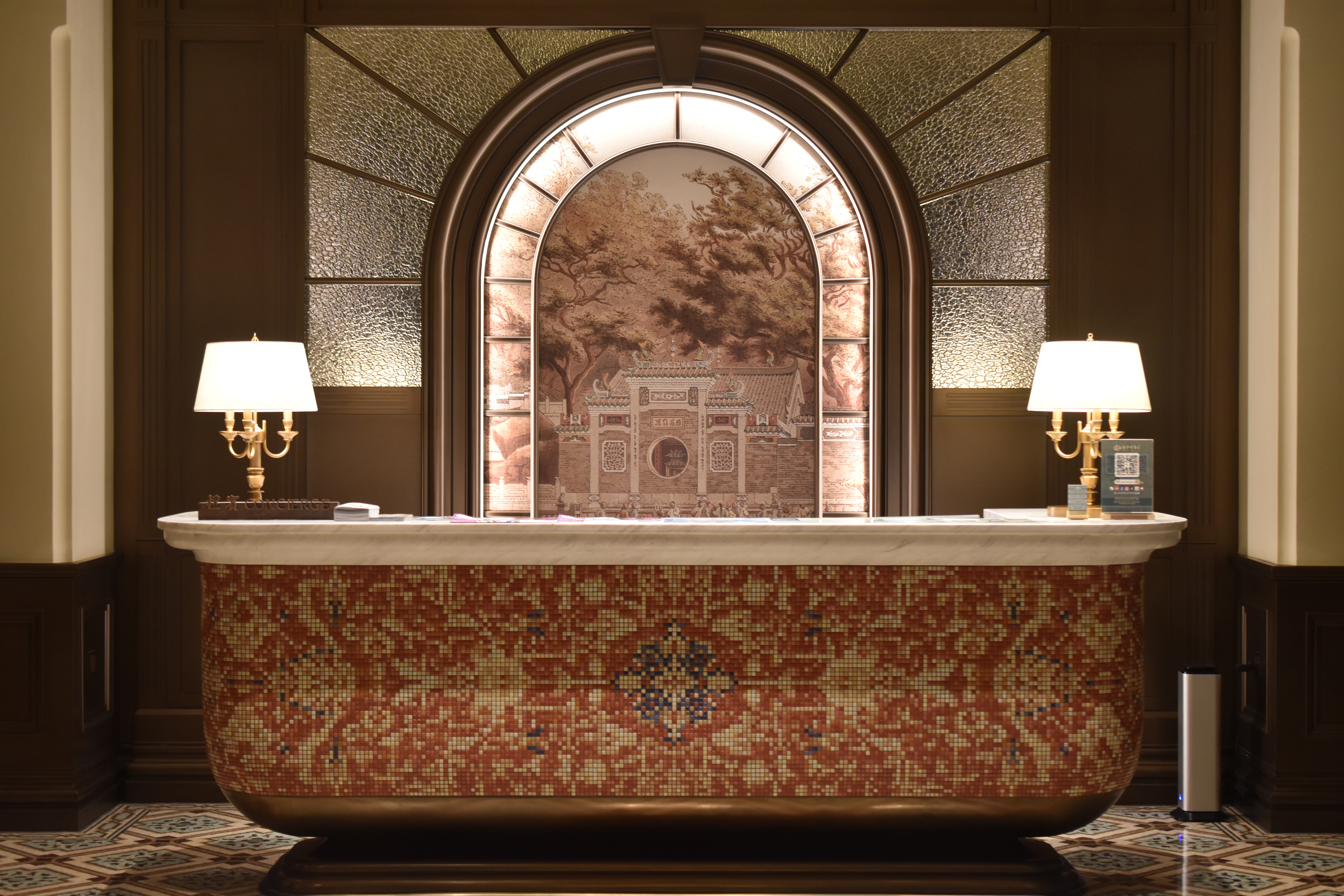
The reception desk

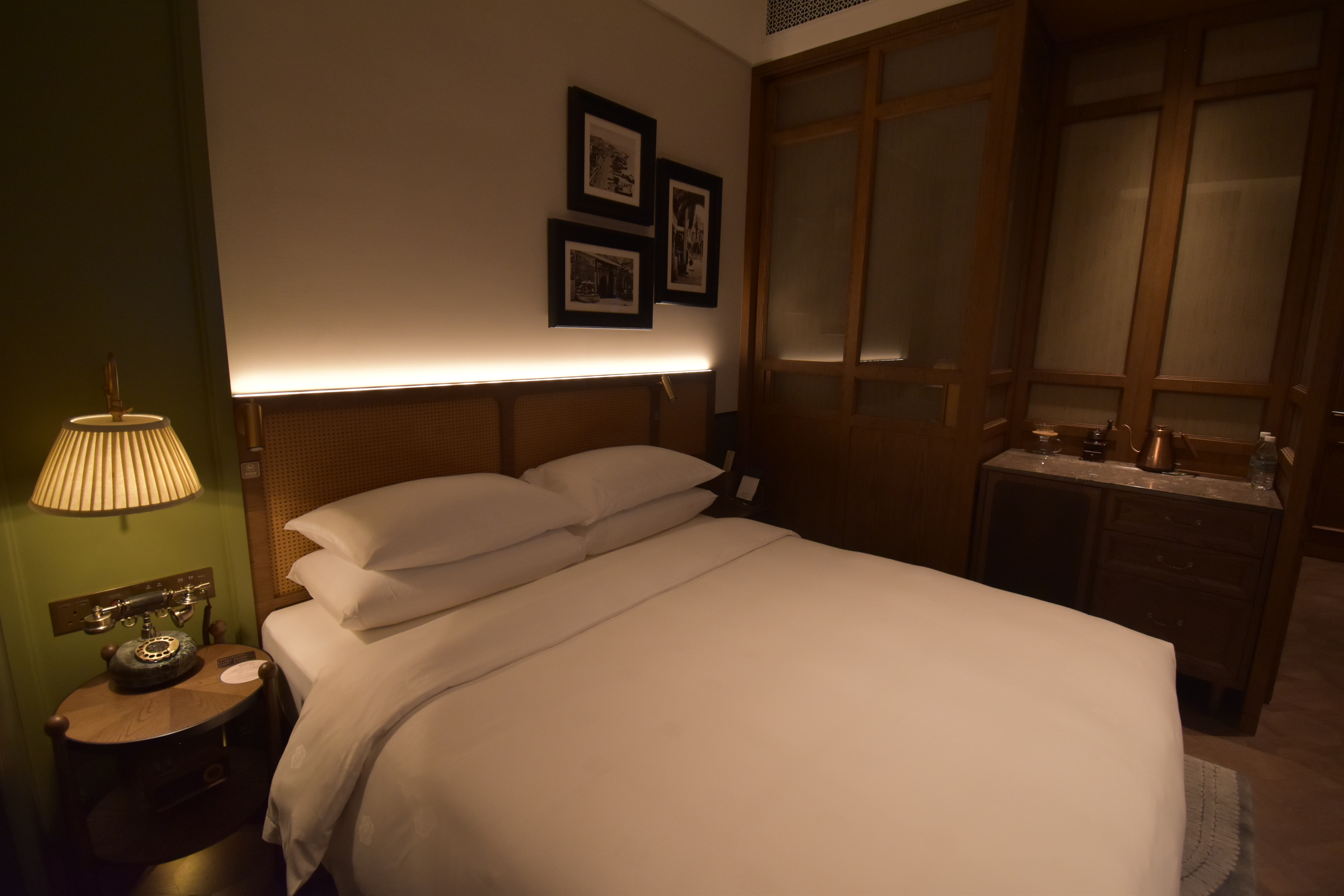
The interior of a room

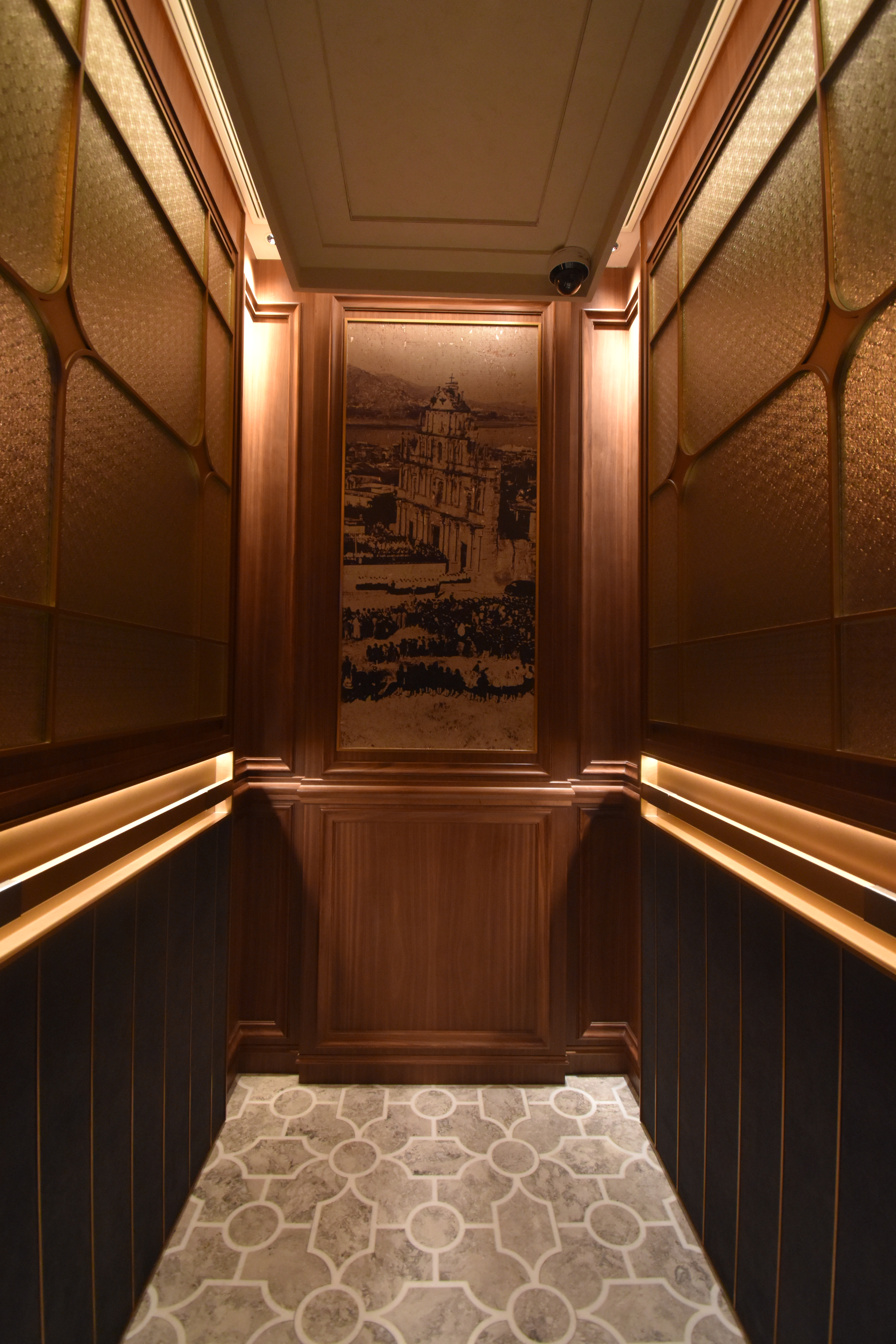
The elevator
