= The Plant Journal =

- Discipline: Plant sciences
- Language: English
- Edited by: Katherine J. Denby

Publication details
- History: 1991–present
- Publisher: Wiley on behalf of the Society for Experimental Biology (United Kingdom)
- Frequency: 24/year
- Open access: Hybrid (delayed)
- Impact factor: 5.7 (2024)

Standard abbreviations
- ISO 4: Plant J.

Indexing
- ISSN: 0960-7412 (print); 1365-313X (web)

Links
- Journal homepage

The Plant Journal is a peer-reviewed scientific journal covering research in plant sciences, with an emphasis on molecular, cellular, and genetic aspects of plant biology. It is published by Wiley on behalf of the Society for Experimental Biology and was established in 1991. The journal publishes 24 issues per year. The current editor-in-chief is Katherine J. Denby (University of York). According to the Journal Citation Reports, the journal has a 2024 impact factor of 5.7.

== History ==
The journal was established in 1991 to provide a dedicated venue for research in plant molecular biology at a time when advances in molecular techniques were transforming the study of plants. The founding editorial emphasized the goal of creating a broad-based, high-quality journal integrating approaches from genetics, biochemistry, cell biology, and development to address fundamental questions in plant biology.

Dianna Bowles served as the founding editor-in-chief from 1991 to 2002 and played a key role in establishing the journal's scope and editorial direction. She was succeeded by Harry Klee (2002–2010), followed by Christoph Benning (2010–2017), during whose tenure the journal marked its twentieth anniversary and further established its position in plant molecular sciences. Subsequent editors-in-chief include Lee Sweetlove (2017–2023) and Katherine J. Denby (2024–present), who has emphasized maintaining high editorial standards and supporting a broad and diverse plant science community.

== Scope and content ==
The journal publishes original research articles and reviews spanning molecular, cellular, and genetic aspects of plant biology, including gene function, genomics, development, signaling, and biotechnology. From its inception, the journal aimed to integrate classical and molecular approaches to address fundamental biological questions in plants and to provide a dedicated venue for plant-focused research that might otherwise be underrepresented in general biology journals.

In addition to primary research articles, the journal publishes reviews, technical advances, resource articles, and special issues highlighting emerging areas in plant science.

== Editors ==
The following individuals have served as editor-in-chief:

- 1991–2002: Dianna Bowles
- 2002–2010: Harry Klee
- 2010–2017: Christoph Benning
- 2017–2023: Lee Sweetlove
- 2024–present: Katherine J. Denby

== Abstracting and indexing ==
The journal is indexed in major bibliographic databases, including Science Citation Index Expanded, Scopus, and MEDLINE/PubMed.
