= Catholic religious institutions, associations, and communities in Macau =

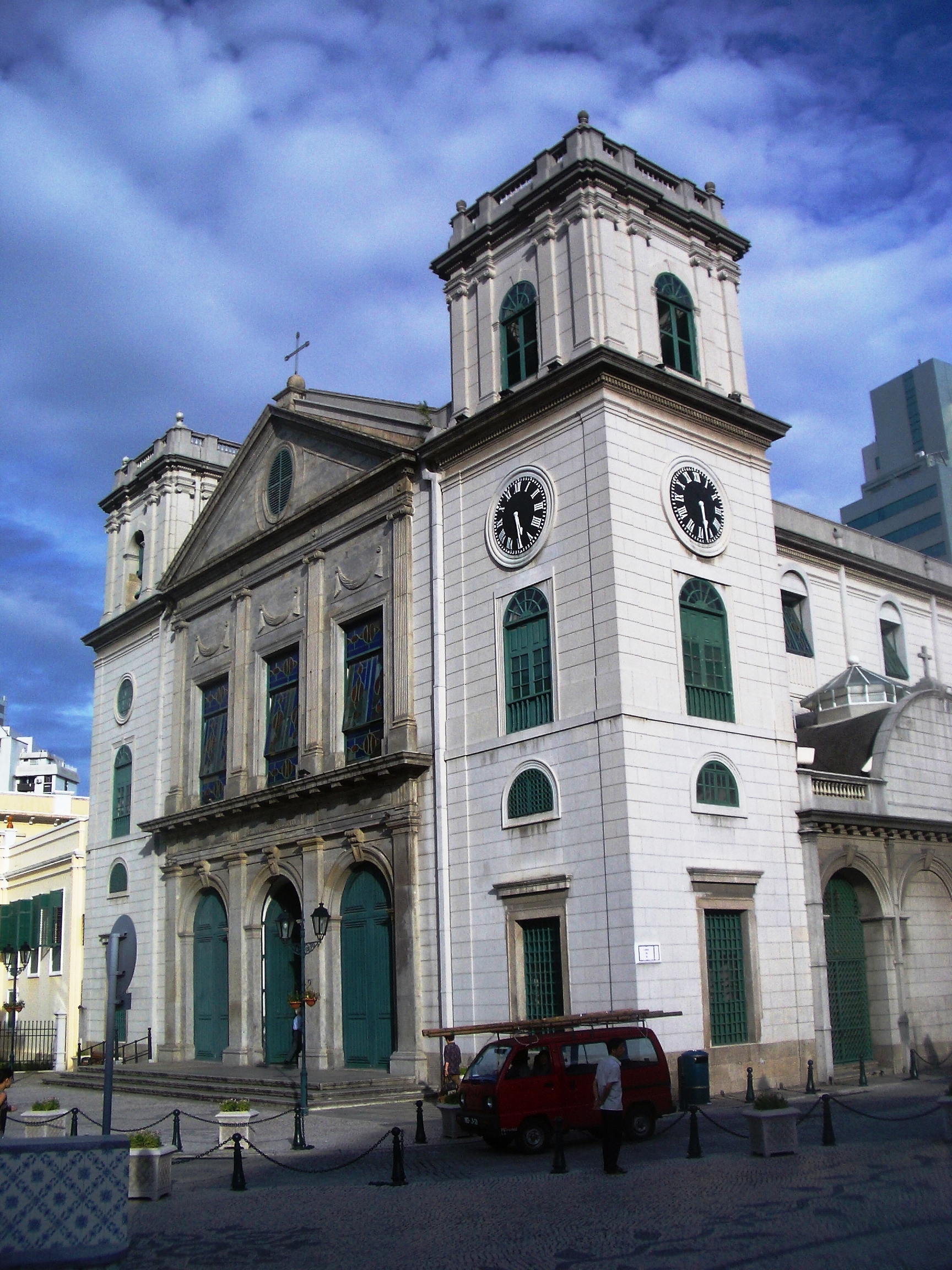
Macau Cathedral

Catholic religious institutions, associations, and communities in Macau operate in the territory of the Macau Special Administrative Region (MSAR), which is currently under the ecclesiastical jurisdiction of the Diocese of Macau, founded on 23 January 1576. Besides its diocesan priests, this Catholic diocese is assisted by various male and female religious orders, congregations, and institutes. The diocese is also supported by various institutions, movements, brotherhoods, and associations of Catholic inspiration made up of lay and religious people. All these Catholic bodies provide a variety of religious, social, educational, welfare, and cultural services to the Catholic and non-Catholic populations of Macau.

== Religious institutions ==
There are several male and female religious orders, congregations, and institutes that provide a variety of religious, social, educational, welfare, and cultural services to the Catholic and non-Catholic populations of Macau. These are, therefore, fundamental to the normal functioning of the Diocese of Macau.

In 2020, there were 10 male religious institutions and 18 female religious institutions in Macau. The male religious institutions were: the Society of Jesus, the Salesians of Don Bosco, the Pious Society of St. Paul, the Comboni Missionaries of the Heart of Jesus, the Dominican Missions of Our Lady of the Rosary, the Society of Our Lady of the Most Holy Trinity (SOLT), the Congregation of the Missionary Sons of the Immaculate Heart of Mary (Claretians), the Society of the Divine Word, the Clerical Congregation of the Blessed Korean Martyrs, and the Congregation of the Priests of the Sacred Heart of Jesus (Dehonians). The female religious institutions were: the Canossian Daughters of Charity, the Franciscan Missionaries of Mary, the Daughters of Mary Help of Christians (Salesian Sisters), the Sisters of the Precious Blood, the Missionaries of Our Lady of the Angels (or Angelinas), the Dominican Missionaries of the Rosary, the Sisters of Our Lady of Charity of the Good Shepherd, the Daughters of St. Paul, the Missionaries of Our Lady of Perpetual Help, the Little Sisters of Jesus, the Missionaries of Charity, the Maryknoll Sisters of St. Dominic, the Congregation of the Sisters of Charity of St. Anne, the Sisters of the Sacred Heart of Jesus and Mary, the Missionaries of Jesus Christ, the Congregation of the Franciscan Missionaries of Our Lady, the Cistercian Order of Strict Observance (Trappist nuns), and the Congregation of Our Lady of Retreat in the Upper Room.

According to statistics from the Macau SAR Government, there were 64 regular priests, 23 religious Brothers, 165 religious Sisters, and 181 volunteer missionaries working in Macau in 2019.

== History ==
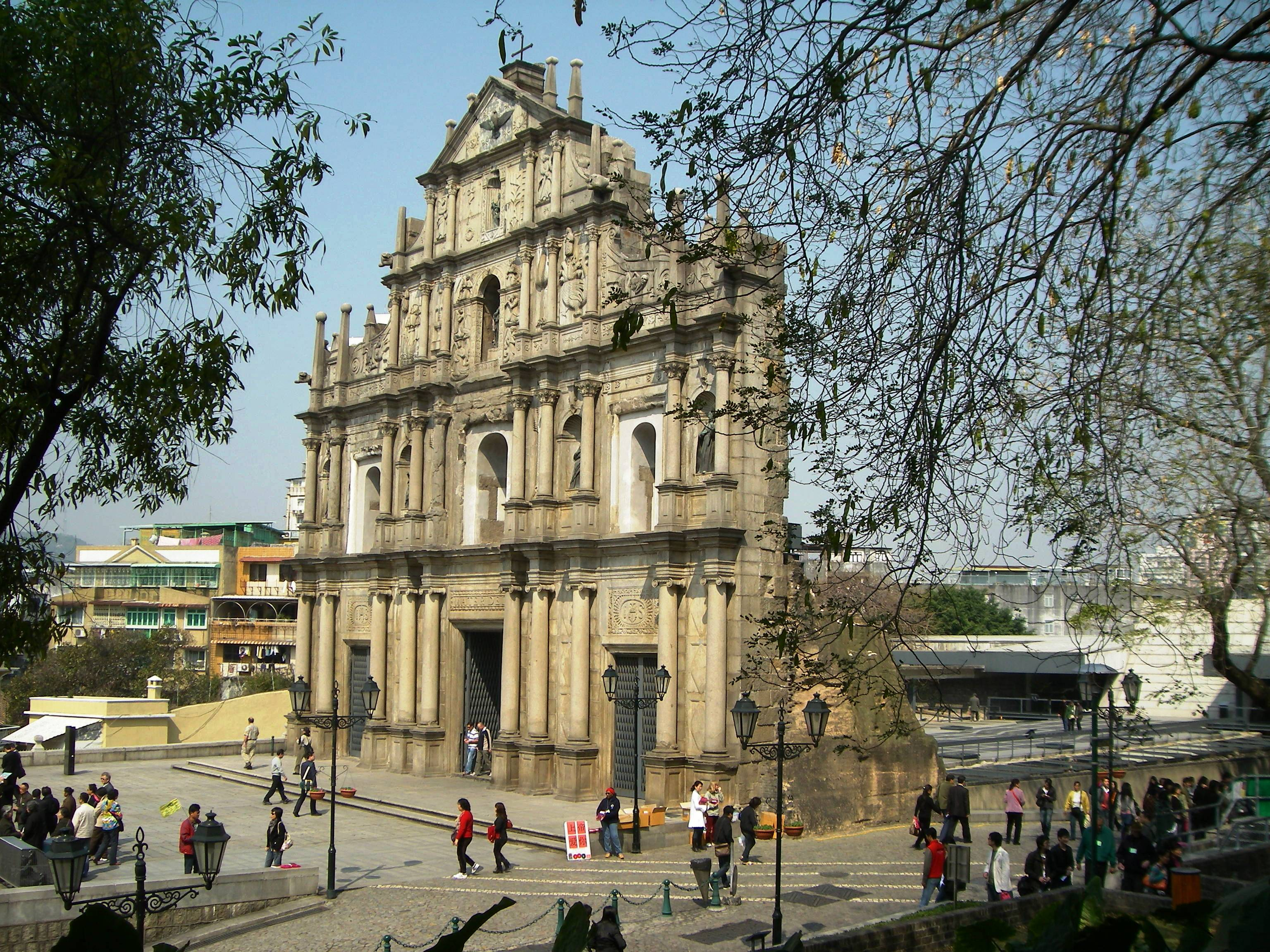
Ruins of Saint Paul's

Macau became an important Portuguese trading establishment in the mid-16th century and therefore became an important departure point for Catholic missionaries to different countries in Asia, mainly China and Japan. The first religious order to settle in Macau was the Society of Jesus, in 1563–1565, which soon established a residence near the present St. Anthony's Church. Instinctively, the Jesuits chose Macau as their headquarters in the Far East, and it was in this city that they built their university college and where their visitators and provincials of China and Japan, among whom was Alessandro Valignano, resided. This powerful religious order, at the service of the Portuguese Padroado, provided bishops for the diocese, built several churches (among which was the Church of the Mother of God), and created several charitable and educational institutions, namely the College of Saint Paul (founded in 1594) and the Seminary of Saint Joseph (founded in 1728). These academic institutions were founded to train missionaries and priests, but the college was eventually destroyed by fire in 1835. As for the Seminary, which operated with various interruptions and alternately by Jesuits, Lazarists, and diocesan priests, it ceased its activities in 1967 due to the lack of priestly vocations.

After the establishment of the Diocese of Macau in 1576, the Franciscans (1579–1580), the Augustinians (1586–1587), the Dominicans (1587–1588), and the Poor Clares (1633–1634) also settled in Macau. All these religious orders, especially the Jesuits, contributed much to education in Macau and the Catholic missions in the Far East. However, in 1762, the Jesuits were expelled from Macau, causing serious problems for the Portuguese Padroado in the Far East. In 1784, the Lazarists came to Macau and took over St. Joseph's Seminary, previously operated by the Jesuits, thus easing the decline of the Portuguese missions. However, the final stroke came in 1834–1835 when the male religious orders were dissolved, ruining the Portuguese missions in China and almost completely eclipsing Western religious life and teaching in Macau. With this extinction, all their property and assets, including churches and convents, were confiscated throughout the Portuguese Empire. Their treatment and use by the Macau authorities were disastrous, the most glaring case being the demolition in 1861 of the Convent and Church of St. Francis, which was built by the Franciscans. In their place, the Macau government built in 1864–1866 the Barracks of São Francisco, which currently houses the Command of the Macau Security Forces.

However, after these events, the Portuguese political situation began to ease and, as a result, the government of Macau began to return most of the confiscated churches to the diocese. In 1862, the Jesuits returned to Macau and rebuilt St. Joseph's Seminary, but were expelled again in 1872, only to return in 1890. With the death of their last nun in 1875, the Poor Clares were considered extinct in Macau, being replaced by the Canossian Daughters of Charity (in 1874) and the Franciscan Missionaries of Mary (in 1903). The Salesians of Don Bosco settled in 1906 and their presence in Macau was felt through the establishment of several educational and charitable institutions, such as the Don Bosco College, the Yuet Wah College, and the Salesian Institute (formerly the Immaculate Conception Orphanage), which was founded in 1906 by Saint Luigi Versiglia. The Salesians also carried out important missionary, educational, and social work in Hong Kong and the Guangdong province, namely in Zhongshan and Shaoguan; Luigi Versiglia was the first bishop and apostolic vicar of Shaoguan. With the establishment of the Portuguese Republic in 1910, the religious orders were expelled from Macau, but many of them continued to operate in the non-Portuguese territories that were under the jurisdiction of the diocese. Later, as the political situation improved, they were able to return to Macau: The Canossians in 1911, the Salesians in 1912, the Jesuits in 1930, and the Missionaries of Mary in 1932. The Missionaries of Our Lady of the Angels arrived in Macau in 1929, the Discalced Carmelite Order in 1941, the Missionaries of Our Lady of Perpetual Help in 1966, and the Daughters of St. Paul in 1969. The latter dedicate themselves to the apostolate of the means of social communication.

In 1974 the Jesuits, Franciscans, Salesians, Canossians, Salesians (or Daughters of Mary Help of Christians), Little Sisters of Jesus, Franciscan Missionaries of Mary, Sisters of the Precious Blood, Dominican Sisters, Carmelite Sisters, Sisters of Our Lady of the Angels, Missionaries of Perpetual Help, Daughters of St. Paul, and Sisters of Our Lady of Charity of the Good Shepherd were in Macau. In 1999, the following religious orders and congregations resided in Macau: Jesuits, Salesians, Dominicans, Comboni Missionaries, Paulists, Redemptorists, Canossians, Franciscan Missionaries of Mary (FMM), Daughters of Mary Help of Christians (FMA), Angelines, Precious Blood, Dominican Sisters, Perpetual Help, Good Shepherd, Charity of St. Anne, Missionaries of Charity, Maryknoll, Little Sisters of Jesus, Little Sisters of Mary, Daughters of St. Paul and Fraternity of St. Agnes. Also in 1999 the St. Joseph the Worker Church and its respective quasi-parish were trusted to the Comboni Missionaries.

In 2011, there were ten male religious communities and twenty-two female religious communities in Macau. The ten male religious communities were: the Society of Jesus, the Salesians of Don Bosco, the Pious Society of St. Paul, the Comboni Missionaries of the Heart of Jesus, the Dominican Missions of Our Lady of the Rosary, the Society of Our Lady of the Most Holy Trinity (SOLT), the Community of the Beatitudes, the Congregation of the Missionary Sons of the Immaculate Heart of Mary, the Society of the Divine Word, and the Clerical Congregation of the Blessed Korean Martyrs. The 22 female religious communities were: the Canossian Daughters of Charity, the Franciscan Missionaries of Mary, the Daughters of Mary Help of Christians, the Sisters of the Precious Blood, the Missionaries of Our Lady of the Angels (or Angelinas), the Dominican Missionaries of the Rosary, the Sisters of Our Lady of Charity of the Good Shepherd, the Daughters of St. Paul, the Missionaries of Our Lady of Perpetual Help, the Little Sisters of Jesus, the Missionaries of Charity, the Sisters of St. Dominic (Maryknoll), the Congregation of the Sisters of Charity of Saint Anne, the Little Sisters of Mary, the Congregation of the Sacred Hearts of Jesus and Mary and of the Perpetual Adoration of the Blessed Sacrament, the Missionaries of Christ Jesus, the Community of Beatitudes, the Secular Institute of Our Lady of the Annunciation, the Congregation of the Franciscan Missionary Sisters of Our Lady, the Sisters of the Blessed Korean Martyrs, the nuns of the Trappist Order, and the Secular Institute of the Volunteers of Don Bosco.

== Other institutions and associations ==
The most active religious and laypeople also gather in various Catholic movements, institutions, and associations. The oldest are the pious associations, which bring together laypeople with a common devotion to a saint, invocation of Our Lady or invocation of Jesus, among which stand out the Confraria de Nosso Senhor Bom Jesus dos Passos, the Confraternity of Our Lady of the Rosary of the Mother of God and the Confraternity of Saint Anthony. These three confraternities are still active in 2020. In 2020, two secular institutes (the Secular Institute of Our Lady of the Annunciation and the Secular Institute of the Volunteers of Don Bosco), as well as the Prelature of the Holy Cross and Opus Dei, were carrying out apostolate and activities in Macau. The Focolare Movement, the Neocatechumenal Way, the Little Brothers and Sisters of Mary, Mother of God, the Serra Club, the Catholic Women's Association of Macau, the Legio Mariae Chinese Curia of Our Lady of Victories (Legion of Mary), the Perpetual Eucharistic Adoration Movement (PEAM) the Couples for Christ Association, the Macao Catholic Bible Association, the Macao Catholic Cultural Association, and the Macao Lay Catholics Association are some examples of Catholic institutions, movements, and associations that were still active in Macao in 2020. The numerous local Catholic schools, operated either by religious institutes or diocesan priests, are currently brought together and represented by the Association of Catholic Schools of Macau and the United Association of Catholic Schools of the Diocese of Macau.

The Focolare Movement began its activities in Macau during the bishopric of Archbishop Paulo José Tavares (1961–1973). During the bishopric of Archbishop Arquimínio Rodrigues da Costa (1976–1988), the Association of Catholic Schools of Macau was established, the Serra Club (in 1977–1978), and the Diocesan Media Center (in 1975). This diocesan body was established to better explore the potential of the media in evangelization. During the bishopric of Bishop Domingos Lam (1988–2003), the Macau Catholic Laymen's Association was established in 1994, and the Inter-University Institute of Macau (now St. Joseph's University), which is currently the only Catholic higher education institution in Macau, was established in 1996.

Among the Catholic social solidarity institutions, the Caritas of Macau stands out, which currently operates a large network of services and infrastructure aimed at helping the poorest and neediest. The Caritas of Macau was the successor of the "Mateus Ricci Social Center", founded in 1951 by the Spanish Jesuit priest Luis Ruiz Suárez in Casa Ricci, which was the Jesuits' residence in Macau at the time. This organization welcomed more than 35,000 refugees from Mainland China, fleeing the Chinese communist regime established in 1949. In 1971, this institution formally became an organization subordinate to the Diocese of Macau and a member of Caritas Internationalis, changing its name to "Caritas of Macau."

With Catholic origins, Santa Casa da Misericórdia, founded in 1569 by Bishop Melchior Carneiro Leitão, is the oldest charitable institution in Macau and currently has independent management from the Diocese.

== Lists made by the Portuguese Government of Macau in 1986 and 1996 ==
Respecting the third article of the Concordat between the Holy See and Portugal (1940), the government of Macau published in 1986 a list of the institutions of a permanent religious character canonically erected in the Diocese of Macau:

- Order of the Discalced Carmelites
- Society of Jesus
- Salesians of Don Bosco
- Canossian Daughters of Charity
- Franciscan Missionaries of Mary
- Sisters of the Precious Blood
- Missionaries of Our Lady of the Angels
- Secular Franciscan Order
- Confraternity of Our Lord Good Jesus of the Steps
- Association of the Charity Benefactors of Saint Francis Xavier
- Brotherhood of Our Lady of Remedies
- Brotherhood of Our Lady of the Rosary of the Mother of God
- Brotherhood of Nossa Senhora da Boa Viagem
- Brotherhood of Saint Anthony of Lisbon
- Brotherhood of the Contract of São Pedro
- Saint Joseph Association
- Women's Catholic Action of Macau
- Saint Joseph's Asylum Pious Association of Macau
- Little Sisters of Jesus
- Congregation of Our Lady of Charity of the Good Shepherd
- Sisters of Saint Dominic (Maryknoll)
- Dominican Missionaries of the Rosary
- Missionaries of Our Lady of Perpetual Help
- Missionaries of Charity
- Daughters of Saint Paul
- Salesian Sisters of Don Bosco
- Missionary Brothers of Charity
- St. Joseph's Seminary and Church
- Cathedral of the Nativity of Our Lady, Macau
- Cathedral Parish (Macau)
- Nossa Senhora de Fátima Parish (Macau)
- Nossa Senhora do Carmo Parish (Taipa)
- Saint Anthony parish (Macau)
- Saint Lazarus parish (Macau)
- São Lourenço Parish (Macau)
- St. Francis of Xavier Mission
- Society of Saint Vincent de Paul
- Association of Catholic Schools of Macau
- Association of the Nuns of Macau (Note: The Association of Women Religious in Macau, which represents the religious sisters working in Macau, was founded during the bishopric of Archimínio Rodrigues da Costa (1976-1988).[25])
- Caritas Internationalis
- Diocesan Secretariat for Social Welfare Services
- Focolare Movement (Work of Mary)
- Comitium of the Legion of Mary
- Christian Courses Movement (Note: The Christianity Course Movement began its activities in Macau during the bishopric of Bishop Paulo José Tavares (1961-1973).[15])
- Catholic Family Support Movement
- Serra Club (Serra Club)
- Diocesan Center for Social Communication Media
- Congregation of the Sisters of Charity of Saint Anne
- Movement of the Little Sisters of Mary
- Pious Association of Saint Francis Xavier

In the 1986 government survey of Catholic institutions, the Cofre dos Pobres (or Cofre do Socorro dos Pobres or Administrative Commission of the Cofre do Socorro dos Pobres), the Portuguese Missions in China (or Administrative Commission of the Assets of the Portuguese Missions in China), the Portuguese Padroado Mission in the Far East, and the Macao Mitra (or Assets of the Macao Mitra) were considered extinct and their assets reverted to the Diocese of Macao. In the new survey done by the Government in 1996, the St. Francis of Assisi Charity Benefactors Association was considered extinct, and its assets reverted to the Parish of St. Lourenço.

== See also ==
- List of bishops of Macau
- O Clarim
- Yuet Wah College
