= José Lai =

Chinese bishop

His Excellency, The Most Reverend José Lai Hung-seng
- Bishop Emeritus of Macau
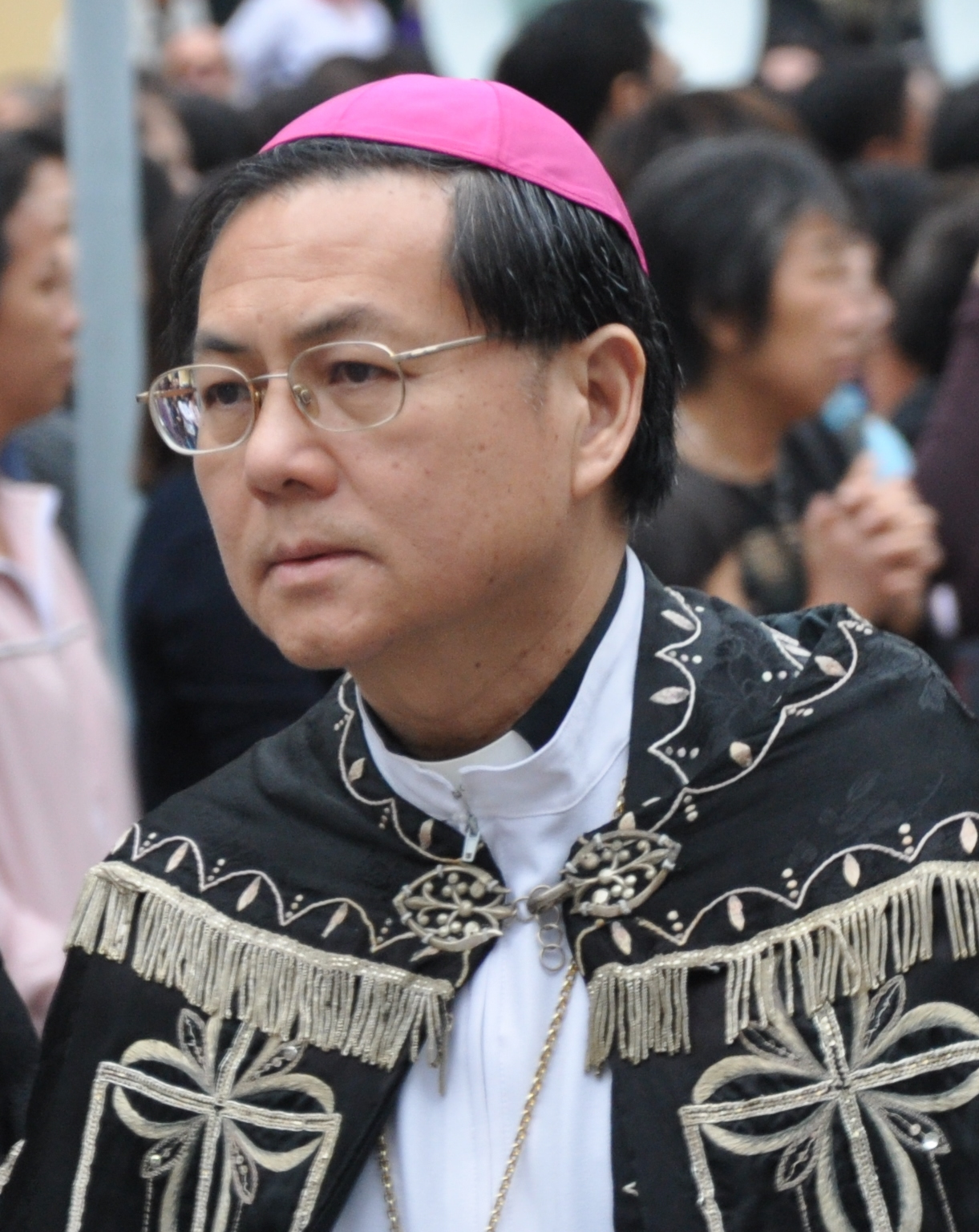
- Church: Roman Catholic Church
- Diocese: Macau
- Installed: 30 June 2003
- Term ended: 16 January 2016
- Predecessor: Domingos Lam
- Successor: Stephen Lee Bun-sang
- Previous post: Coadjutor Bishop of Macau (2001–2003)

Orders
- Ordination: 28 October 1972
- Consecration: 2 June 2001 by Domingos Lam

Personal details
- Born: 14 January 1946 (age 80) Portuguese Macau
- Denomination: Roman Catholic
- Residence: Macau
- Parents: Joseph Paul Lai Sio Kei; Maria Celestina Tchoi Lao Mei
- Education: St. Joseph's Seminary and Church; Diocesan Seminary of Leiria (1967–1971)
- Coat of arms: José Lai Hung-seng's coat of arms

Styles of José Lai Hung-seng
- Reference style: His Excellency; The Most Reverend
- Spoken style: Your Excellency
- Religious style: Bishop

José Lai
- Chinese: 黎鴻昇
Transcriptions
Standard Mandarin
- Hanyu Pinyin: Lí Hóngshēng
- Wade–Giles: Li Hung-sheng
- Yale Romanization: Lí Húngshēng
- IPA: [lǐ xʊ̌ŋʂə́ŋ]
Yue: Cantonese
- Yale Romanization: Làih Hùhng Sing
- Jyutping: Lai4 Hung4 Sing1
- IPA: [lɐ̏i hʊ̏ŋɕɪ́ŋ]

Ordination history of José Lai
History
Priestly ordination
- Date: 28 October 1972
- Place: Portuguese Macau
Episcopal consecration
- Principal consecrator: Domingos Lam (Macau)
- Co-consecrators: Arquimínio Rodrigues da Costa (Macau em.); John Tong Hon (Hong Kong aux.)
- Date: 2 June 2001
- Place: Cathedral of the Nativity of Our Lady, Macau

José Lai Hung-seng (Chinese: 黎鴻昇; born 14 January 1946 in Macau) is the Roman Catholic Bishop Emeritus of Macau, the first born in the diocese and the second Chinese bishop, the first being Domingos Lam. Lai was appointed on 23 January 2001 Coadjutor and succeeded on 30 June 2003. He was succeeded by Bishop Stephen Lee Bun-sang (Chinese: 李斌生) on 23 January 2016.

Lai was born in Macau and attended St. Joseph's Seminary and Church before going to Portugal for further studies at Diocesan Seminary of Leiria from 1967 to 1971 and to Grottaferrata.

Catholic Church titles
Vacant Title last held by Domingos Lam	Coadjutor Bishop of Macau; 2001–2003	Vacant
Preceded by Domingos Lam	Bishop of Macau; 2003–2016	Succeeded by Stephen Lee
