= Macau Catholic Schools Association =

Chinese name
- Traditional Chinese: 天主教學校協進會
- Simplified Chinese: 天主教学校协进会
Transcriptions
Standard Mandarin
- Hanyu Pinyin: Tiānzhǔjiào Xuéxiào Xiéjìnhuì
Yue: Cantonese
- Jyutping: tin1 zyu2 gaau3 hok6 haau6 hip3 zeon3 wui5

Federation of Catholic Schools of Macau
- Traditional Chinese: 天主教學校協進會
Transcriptions

Portuguese name
- Portuguese: Associação das Escolas Católicas de Macau

Macau Catholic Schools Association (Portuguese: Associação das Escolas Católicas de Macau, AECM; Chinese: 澳門天主教學校聯會) was established by the Bishop of Macau Paulo José Tavares during the 1960s.

== History ==
Paulo José Tavares established Federation of Catholic Schools of Macau (天主教學校協進會) in 1967 and it was supported by Salesian and Jesuit priests. After the bishop's death in 1973, the activities of the association were put on hold. When Arquimínio Rodrigues da Costa became the new bishop of Macau in 1982, the Federation became active again and was renamed Macau Catholic Schools Association.

== Purpose ==
The purpose of the Union is the federation of organizations to unite all the catholic schools which are located in Macau. Moreover, it also promotes moral education, and under the guidance of the bishop, complete cultivation and spread of the Gospel and other related issues.

== Membership ==
- Colégio Diocesano de São José 5
- Escola de São José Ka-Ho
- Our Lady Of Fatima Girls' School
- Colégio Mateus Ricci
- Escola São João de Brito
- Chan Sui Ki Perpetual Help College
- Instituto Salesiano
- Escola Estrela do Mar
- Yuet Wah College
- Escola do Santissimo Rosario
- Escola São Paulo
- Escola Dom João Paulino
- Escola de Santa Teresa
- Sacred Heart Canossian College (English Section)
- Colégio Escola Dom Luis Versiglia
- Yuet Wah College, Escola Caritas de Macau
- Escola Madalena de Canossa
- Colegio de Santa Rosa de Lima (Chinese Secondary)
- Colegio de Santa Rosa de Lima (English Secondary)
- Escola Santa Maria Mazzarello

Schools that are managed by Caritas Macau are members of the Association.
