= St. Lawrence's Church, Macau =

Catholic Church in Macau, China

Coordinates: 22.1885°N 113.5349°E

St. Lawrence's Church
- 聖老楞佐堂
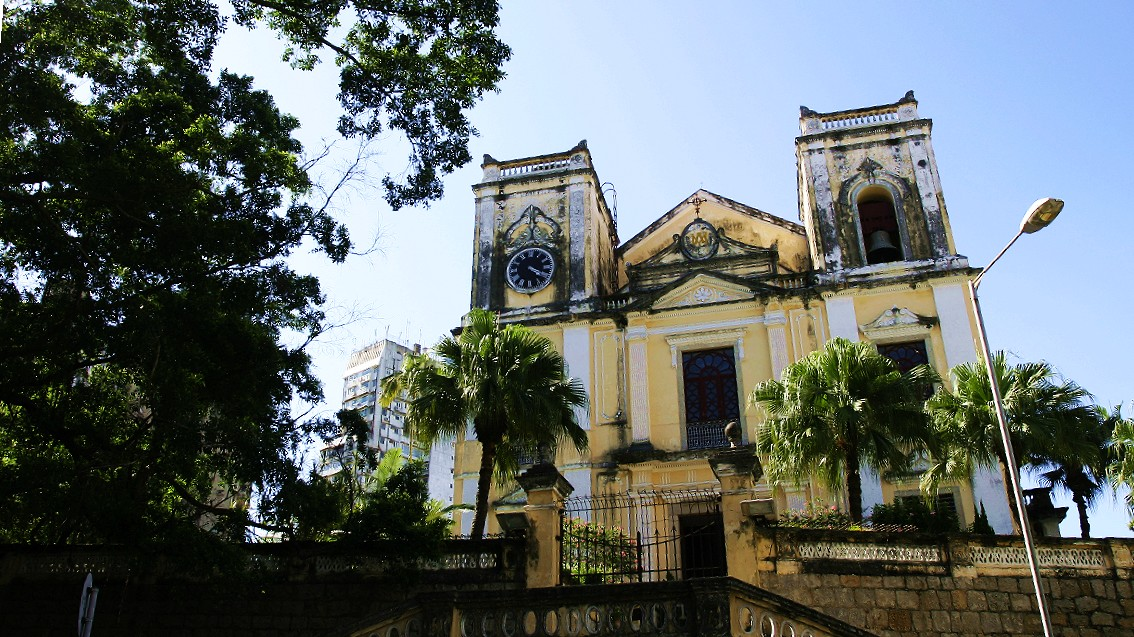
- St. Lawrence's Church
- Location: Rua de São Lourenço, Macau

History
- Status: Parish Church
- Founded: 1560; 466 years ago

Administration
- Diocese: Macau

Clergy
- Bishop: Stephen Lee
- Priest: Cyril Jerome Law Jr.

St. Lawrence's Church, Macau

Chinese name
- Traditional Chinese: 聖老楞佐堂
- Simplified Chinese: 圣老楞佐堂
Transcriptions
Standard Mandarin
- Hanyu Pinyin: Shèng Lǎoléngzuǒ Táng
Yue: Cantonese
- Jyutping: sing3 lou5 ling4 zo3 tong4

Portuguese name
- Portuguese: Igreja de São Lourenço

St. Lawrence's Church (Chinese: 聖老楞佐堂; Portuguese: Igreja de São Lourenço) is one of the oldest churches in Macau, China. It is located on Rua de São Lourenço, opposite Instituto Salesiano.

The church was first built before 1560 by the Jesuits. It was later rebuilt in 1846. The present church is a neoclassical structure with a yellow exterior. The interior of the church is decorated with ornate pillars and chandeliers.

Aside from it being a place of worship for Catholics in Macau, St. Lawrence's Church is also a popular tourist destination.

== See also ==
- Religion in Macau
- Catholic Church in Macau
