= Escola Dom João Paulino =

Nonprofit school in Macau

Escola Dom João Paulino 聖善學校

Location
- S/N, Avenida de Carlos da Maia, Taipa, Macau; 22°09′12″N 113°33′30″E

Information
- Type: Nonprofit
- Motto: 禮、義、廉、恥 (courtesy, righteousness, integrity and sense of shame)
- Religious affiliation: Catholic
- Established: 1911
- School district: Freguesia de Nossa Senhora do Carmo
- Principal: Ng Sai Wa (吳世華)
- Faculty: About 30
- Grades: 9 (from Kindergarten to Primary, 1 class for each grade)
- Enrollment: About 180
- Language: Chinese, English
- Area: About 2000 m²
- Website: https://www.edjp.edu.mo/

Escola Dom João Paulino

Chinese name
- Traditional Chinese: 聖善學校
- Simplified Chinese: 圣善学校
Transcriptions
Standard Mandarin
- Hanyu Pinyin: Shèng Shàn Xuéxiào
Yue: Cantonese
- Jyutping: sing3 sin6 hok6 haau6

Portuguese name
- Portuguese: Escola Dom João Paulino

Escola Dom João Paulino (Chinese: 聖善學校) is one of the earliest schools built in Macau, established in 1911. Located on Taipa, it is operated by the Diocese of Macau. It is a member of the Macau Catholic Schools Association.

It is named after João Paulino de Azevedo e Castro, a bishop of the Diocese of Macau.

== History ==
In 1895, the Canossian nuns opened catechism classes for local children, which became the predecessor of Escola Dom João Paulino.

In 1911, about 70 people were studying here. The school was built next to Our Lady of Carmel Church. After that, Priest Estevão Eusébio Sítu (司徒澤雄) took over the school and named it as 聖善 (sing3 sin6, lit. "Holiness"). The native-born Portuguese people called it Escola Dom João Paulino, which means "the School of Bishop João Paulino".

In 1938, the diocese allocated a building on No. 89-91, Rua Direita Carlos Eugénio for developing a complete primary school.

== Environment ==
- Ground floor: hall, playground, teachers’ office, principal’s office
- 1st floor: Kindergarten, Primary 1, music room
- 2nd floor: Primary 2-5
- 3rd floor: Primary 6, library, computer room

== Principals ==
The school has had 20 principals since its foundation.

1. Priest Estevão Eusébio Sítu (司徒澤麟, 1911)
2. Priest Pedro da Conceição Hui (許叢壽, 1923)
3. Priest Lourenço Mahn (萬靈舟, 1928)
4. Priest 呂子莊 (1939)
5. Priest Antonio Andre Ngan (顏儼若, 1941)
6. Priest Inacio Ho (何志仁, 1959)
7. Priest Domingos Lam (林家駿, November 1959)
8. Priest Luís G. Lei (李冠章, April 1962)
9. Priest Mateus Lau (劉志超) and Priest 楊安道 (1964)
10. Nun Margarite Tien (田秀芬, 1964)
11. Nun Madalena Song (宋秀琴, 1976)
12. Nun 鄭金蘭 (1980)
13. Nun Margaret Lau Po Sheung (劉寶嫦, February 1984)
14. Priest Francisco Kwan (關傑享, August 1984)
15. Priest José Lau Chit Meng (劉哲明, May 1985)
16. Priest Francisco Xavier Chan (陳寶存, February 1991)
17. Priest Pedro Paulo Hó (何發全, April 1992)
18. Mr 張觀威 (August 2000)
19. Nun 李秀明 (August 2009)
20. Ms Ng Sai Wa 吳世華 (September 2015)

== Famous alumni ==
- José Lai: current Roman Catholic Bishop of the Diocese of Macao, graduated in 1958

== See also ==
- Roman Catholic Diocese of Macau
