= Instituto Salesiano =

Government-subsidized school in Macau

Instituto Salesiano 慈幼中學
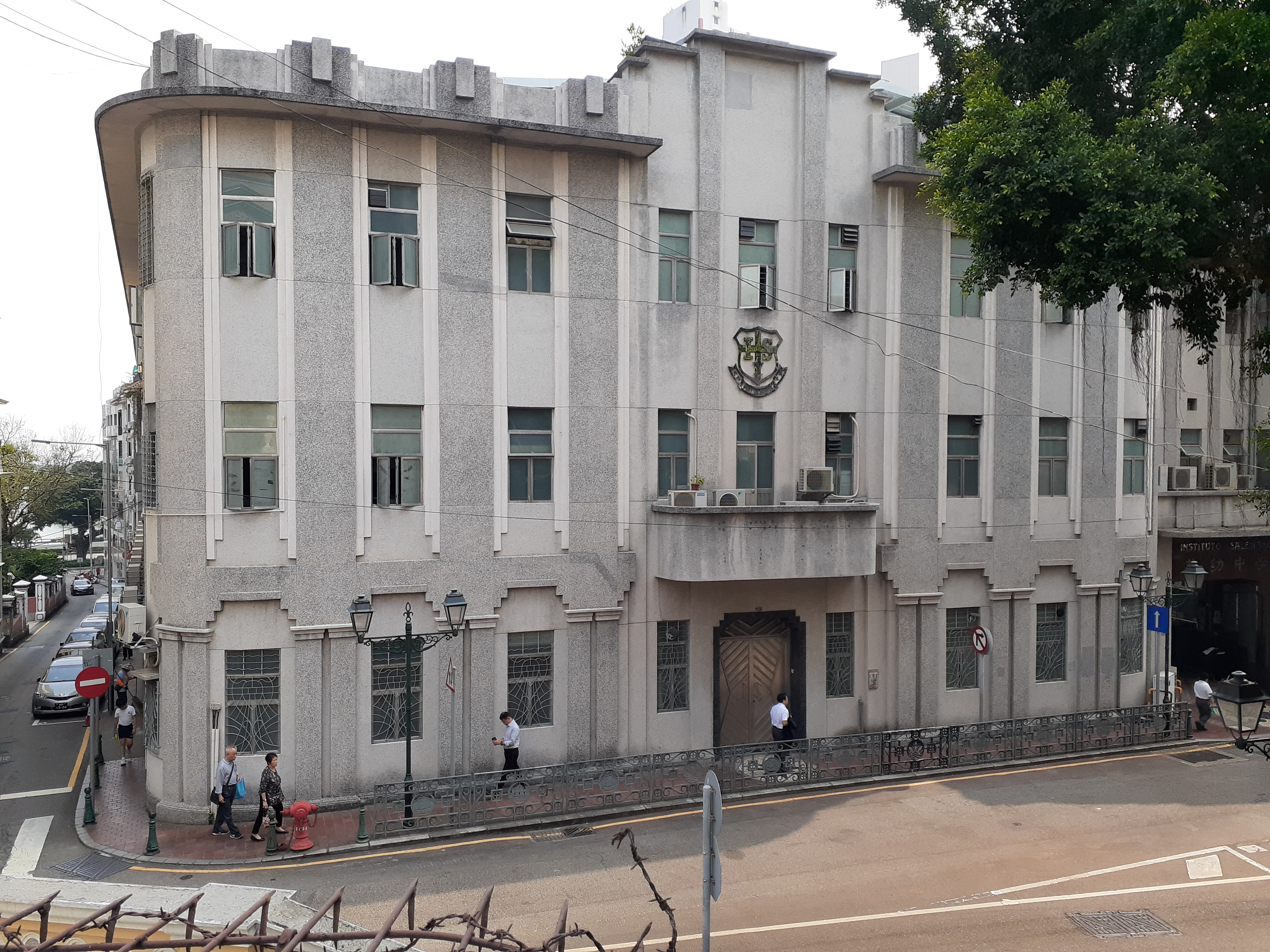
- School building
- 16 Rua de São Lourenço; Macau

Information
- Type: Government subsidized
- Motto: PURI ET FORTES (Latin) 純潔與剛毅 (Chinese)
- Established: 1906
- Principal: Mr. Leong, Su Weng
- Grades: P.1 - F.6
- Gender: Male Only
- Enrollment: 1896
- Education system: Secondary Section:GCE
- Language: English&Cantonese
- Affiliation: Salesians of Don Bosco
- Website: ism.edu.mo

Instituto Salesiano
- Traditional Chinese: 澳門慈幼中學
- Simplified Chinese: 澳门慈幼中学
Transcriptions
Standard Mandarin
- Hanyu Pinyin: Àomén Cíyòu Zhōngxué
Yue: Cantonese
- Jyutping: ou3 mun4*2 ci4 jau3 zung1 hok6

Instituto Salesiano (or IS, Instituto Salesiano da Imaculada Conceição, Chinese: 澳門慈幼中學) is a Catholic elementary school through secondary school in São Lourenço (St. Lawrence's Parish), Macau. The school is one of the oldest educational institutions founded in Macau. The medium of instruction is English, although some particular subjects such as Chinese Literature and Chinese History are taught in Cantonese. It is a member of the Macau Catholic Schools Association.

== History ==
Instituto Salesiano was established in 1906, during the Qing dynasty, by Fr. Louis Versiglia. The school is run by the Salesians of Don Bosco, aims at giving the students a complete and balanced education in different aspects. The campus, front of St. Lawrence's Church, was originally owned by the British East India Company. Since 1976, the school has become an exam center of General Certificate of Education as well as an exam center of City and Guilds of London Institute.

People's Education profiled the school in 1999. The school opened three new buildings in 2023 with funding from the government.

== Campus ==
In 2016 the 8,008-square-metre (86,200 sq ft) campus included a building that was built sometime before 1916. In 2016 the school made plans to raze the building so it could build new buildings as part of an expansion.

== Principals ==
	Chinese names	English names	Term start	Term end
1	聖雷鳴道神父	Saint Fr. Luigi Versiglia, SDB	1906	1918
2	金以義神父	Fr. Vicent Bernardini, SDB	1918	1925
3	路加神父	Fr. Lucas Da Silva, SDB	1925	1927
4	楊春忱神父	Fr. John Pedrazzini, SDB	1927	1931
5	溫普仁神父	Fr. John Guarona, SDB	1931	1937
6	陳基慈神父	Fr. Marius Acquistapace, SDB	1937	1946
7	溫普仁神父	Fr. John Guarona, SDB	1946	1951
8	時乃德神父	Fr. Martin Schneidtberger, SDB	1951	1960
9	司馬榮神父	Fr. Guilherme Schrid, SDB	1960	1966
10	馬耀漢神父	Fr. Alexander Ma Tiu-hon, SDB	1966	1968
11	馬士沖神父	Fr. Matthias Mo Tze-tsong, SDB	1968	1969
12	魯炳義神父	Fr. Luigi RUBINI, SDB, SDB	1969	1972
13	朱懷德神父	Fr. Mario Rosso, SDB	1972	1976
14	陳日君樞機	Fr. Joseph Zen Ze-kiun, SDB	1976	1978
15	馬耀漢神父	Fr. Alexander Ma Yiu-hon, SDB	1978	1984
16	麥觀黔神父	Fr. Joseph Mak Keun-kim, SDB	1984	1987
17	孔智剛神父	Fr. Francis Hung Chi-kong, SDB	1987	1995
18	胡德鎏神父	Fr. Estanislaus Vu Tak-lau, SDB	1995	2003
19	周伯輝神父	Fr. Chow Pak-fai, SDB	2003	2015
21	周伯輝神父	Fr. Chow Pak-fai, SDB	2017	2022
22	梁樹榮老師	Mr. Leong, Su Weng	2022	Current

== School Hymn ==
The anthem was transcribed by Austrian missionary Fr. Guilherme Schmid

School Anthem of Instituto Salesiano of Macau 澳門慈幼中學校歌(Chinese)

維我鮑思高慈幼學校

時代青年訓練場

四育並重國粹精良

師生友愛永無疆

校譽日隆學匯中西

滿門朝氣樂洋洋

秉承會祖鮑思高遺教

取法聖多明我表樣

我青年 步武聖賢

效忠聖教作棟樑

願同學 敦品勵學

揚我校風增榮光

== Student Organizations ==
=== Student Service Organizations ===
- Student Council
- Discipline Team
- Interact Club
- Estação de Televisão de Instituto Salesiano: Under the Public Relations Office, the school’s largest media production group. Established in the 2023–2024 school year, it is responsible for producing videos, photos, and written media for both on- and off-campus events.
- Captain: Composed of two class captains from each secondary class, totalling 52 members. They guide students in an orderly evacuation during emergencies.
- Wind band of Instituto Salesiano: Established in 1906.
- Societa dell' Allegria
- ISM Photography Club
- ISM Multimedia Team
- Library Club
- Campus Life Promotion Team
- School Archives Association
- Scout

=== Academic Societies ===
- Visual Art Society
- Chinese Society
- Geography Society: The youngest academic society in the school.
- Business Society: The Business Society is unique in that it represents a senior secondary elective; students who do not take business may never engage with it.
- DAT Club: The largest academic society in the school by membership.
- Mathematics Club: The longest-established academic society.
- Science Club

== ISSC ==
Instituto Salesiano Student Council, established in 1997, is the officially recognized student organization of the school.
ISSC holds singing competition regularly every year ("Music's Demo" in 2010,"Blue's End" in 2011)
Website:http://www.ism.edu.mo/issc/index.htm

== Notable alumni ==
- Domingos Lam (The first Chinese born bishop in the Roman Catholic Diocese of Macau.)
- Domingos Chan (Macau professional football player who plays as a goalkeeper for Macau team. He currently plays for Sun Hei in the Hong Kong First Division League.)
- Ao Man-long (ex- Secretary for Transport and Public Works of Macau)
- Fr. Pedro Ho (The director-general of Bosco Youth Service Network.)
- Brian Leong Ka Hang (Macau Top Footballer of the Year of 2011.)

== See also ==
- Salesians of Don Bosco
- Yuet Wah College
- Salesian English School
