= António Joaquim de Medeiros =

Portuguese prelate

The Most Reverend António Joaquim de Medeiros 明德祿
- Bishop of Macau
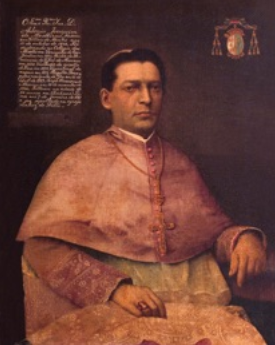
- Church: Roman Catholic Church
- See: Macau
- Appointed: 4 September 1884
- Term ended: 7 January 1897
- Predecessor: Manuel Bernardo de Sousa Enes
- Successor: José Manuel de Carvalho

Orders
- Ordination: 1871
- Consecration: 15 August 1883; Se Cathedral, Old Goa by Archbishop António Sebastião Valente

Personal details
- Born: 15 October 1846 Vilar de Nantes, Kingdom of Portugal
- Died: 7 January 1897 (aged 50) Lahane, Portuguese Timor
- Parents: Augusto Luís Medeiros; Teresa de Jesus Carneiro
- Motto: Christus heri et hodie Christ is the same yesterday and today (from Hebrews 13:8)

António Joaquim de Medeiros (Chinese: 明德祿; 15 October 1846 – 7 January 1897) was a Portuguese prelate of the Roman Catholic Church. He was born in Portugal, and ordained in 1871. By the mid-1870s he was working in Portuguese Macau, and in 1877 he travelled to Portuguese Timor to serve in the Catholic missions there. In 1882, he was appointed Auxiliary Bishop of Goa, and in 1884 he was selected Bishop of Macau. He served in that position until his death in 1897.

== Biography ==
=== Early life and priesthood ===
Medeiros was born on 15 October 1846 in the village of Vilar de Nantes, Portugal, near the city of Chaves. He was the only son of Augusto Luís Medeiros and Teresa de Jesus Carneiro.

Medeiros was ordained a priest in 1871. Following ordination he became a professor at St. Joseph's Seminary in Macau. In 1873 he was appointed prefect and two years later, dean of the seminary. Also in 1875, he was appointed visitor of the Catholic missions in Portuguese Timor, and two years later rose to the position of vicar general.

=== Missionary work in Timor ===
He arrived in Dili in 1877 with a team of nine Portuguese priests and one Chinese priest from Macau, all trained at the Seminary of Bonjardim in Portugal. He set out to evangelize the people and reform the mission. This was prompted by a visit Medeiros made to Timor two years earlier, in which he concernedly wrote to the Bishop of Macau, Manuel Bernardo de Sousa Enes, regarding the state of Timorese Christianity and social institutions, particularly the "primitive" and "immoral" state of marriage and the family. Medeiros wrote:

They don't know about family ties. The simplest principles of natural and moral Law, the social relationships that create a family amongst men: everything is ignorance, everything is misery amongst these unfortunate people.

When Medeiros took over the missions, the priests set out evangelising and combating "anti-Christian" institutions, and were fervent in their targeting of the barlake (Portuguese: barlaque) system in which the chiefs of ruling houses would exchange wives as gifts. "The Devil," as one priest dubbed it, was "always seeking the loss of souls," a "superstitious" institution that was seen by the missionaries as the main threat to the establishment of Christianity as the mainstream faith of Timorese society, because it encouraged polygyny and concubinage. To combat this, Medeiros sent written instructions to his missionaries emphasising the need to celebrate marriages and baptisms amongst the families of the tribal elite. In addition to the native resistance to the missionaries' efforts, Medeiros placed blame on the Portuguese colonial authorities, stemming from his belief in their tolerance and even complicity in the native practices, including barlake. He wrote:

In Timor there circulates as a commonplace the idea that the authorities are forced to respect the manners and customs of the natives, and therefore they have nothing to do with the pagan marriages between Christians. If they simply would do this, it would not be too bad, because the missionaries would rectify in practice such an absurd error; however, cases have occurred that demonstrate with clear evidence the very intolerable abuses of some hinterland authorities who fight against Catholic matrimony between Christian natives.

Medeiros accused Portuguese officers of "spreading doctrines contrary [to Catholic teachings]" and of blocking missionary efforts. This culminated in 1881 when Medeiros denounced the rape of two young native girls by a Portuguese military commandant and a Timorese noble, further accusing the officer of ordering a native chief to give him his daughters. He also scathingly denounced several military officers who ordered a tribal leader to hand over his young daughter, whom the men had seen in church. Also around this time, comparable accusations of missionary priests having sexual relations with Timorese noblewomen were made by military officers. These counter-accusations culminated around the same time when the Governor of Portuguese Timor, Celestino da Silva, wrote scathing letters to Medeiros as well as the Bishop of Macau, denouncing "scandalous" cases involving the priests. The tension was so strong between the missionaries and the colonial authorities that Medeiros did at least once consider terminating the mission. Medeiros wrote to the Bishop of Macau in 1881:

[The missionaries] cannot baptise or marry even one régulo, without, for this reason, suffering threats from the military and even from the Governor; because of all this they [the missionaries] beg Your Excellency to order their withdrawal from Timor and their return to Portugal. As for myself I beg the same, and my wish is to accompany them and go away.

Although the Bishop did not appear to heed these requests, the next year Medeiros did indeed leave the missions, leaving a widely recognized legacy of a well-established Catholic faith, and education system, in Portuguese Timor.

=== Episcopacy ===
On 29 August 1882, Pope Leo XIII appointed Medeiros Titular Bishop of Thermopylae and Auxiliary Bishop of Goa. His consecration took place on 15 August 1883, and was presided over by Archbishop António Sebastião Valente, Archbishop of Goa.

On 4 September 1884, Medeiros was selected Bishop of Macau, and was confirmed on 13 November of that same year. In 1887, he served as principal consecrator of Bishop João Gomes Ferreira. He was known to support the work of the Canossians in the diocese, and in 1890 he handed leadership of St. Joseph's Seminary to the Society of Jesus. He spent much of his time visiting far-flung parishes of the diocese, including St. Joseph Church in Singapore and St. Peter Church in Malacca, as well as regular trips to the parishes and missions of Timor.

=== Death and legacy ===
He died on 7 January 1897, in Lahane, a small town near the city of Dili, Portuguese Timor, at the age of 50.

In Macau, his memory lives on in the form of a street that bears his name. In 1997, on the 100th anniversary of Medeiros' death, former seminarians of the Diocese of Díli's Our Lady of Fatima Minor Seminary organized the Fundaçao Bispo de Medeiros (English: Bishop de Medeiros Foundation), the aim of which is to continue Medeiros' work to preserve Timorese culture and promote human resource development.

== Episcopal lineage ==
- Cardinal Scipione Rebiba
- Cardinal Giulio Antonio Santorio (1566)
- Cardinal Girolamo Bernerio, OP (1586)
- Archbishop Galeazzo Sanvitale (1604)
- Cardinal Ludovico Ludovisi (1621)
- Cardinal Luigi Caetani (1622)
- Cardinal Ulderico Carpegna (1630)
- Cardinal Paluzzo Paluzzi Altieri degli Albertoni (1666)
- Pope Benedict XIII (1675)
- Pope Benedict XIV (1724)
- Archbishop Enrico Enríquez (1743)
- Bishop Manuel Quintano Bonifaz (1749)
- Cardinal Buenaventura Córdoba Espinosa de la Cerda (1761)
- Cardinal Giuseppe Maria Pamphili (1773)
- Pope Pius VIII (1800)
- Bl. Pope Pius IX (1827)
- Cardinal Alessandro Franchi (1856)
- Archbishop Gaetano Aloisi Masella (1877)
- Archbishop António Sebastião Valente (1881)
- Bishop António Joaquim de Medeiros (1883)
