= Diogo Correia Valente =

Most Reverend Diogo Correia Valente
- Bishop of Funai
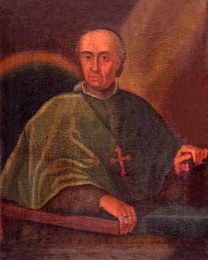
- Church: Catholic Church
- Diocese: Roman Catholic Diocese of Funay
- In office: 1618–1633
- Predecessor: Luís Cerqueira
- Successor: None

Orders
- Ordination: 1599
- Consecration: 18 Mar 1618 by Ottavio Accoramboni

Personal details
- Born: 1567 Lisbon, Portugal
- Died: 28 Oct 1633 (age 66) Macau

Diogo Correia Valente, S.J. (Latin: Didacus Valente, Spanish: Diego Carreia Valente) was a Roman Catholic prelate who served as Bishop of Funay (1618–1633).

== Biography ==
Diogo Correia Valente was born in 1567 in Lisbon, Portugal. He was ordained a priest in the Society of Jesus.

On 8 Jan 1618, he was appointed during the papacy of Pope Paul V as Bishop of Funay. On 18 Mar 1618, he was consecrated bishop by Ottavio Accoramboni, Bishop Emeritus of Fossombrone. He was unable to reach his diocese because of persecution. After the bishop of Macau, João Pinto da Piedade, O.P., returned to Europe in 1615, he was named in 1623 as administrator of the diocese. He died on 28 Oct 1633 in Macau. He was buried in the Madre de Deus church but later transferred to the Cathedral of the Nativity of Our Lady after the church was destroyed in a fire.

Catholic Church titles
Preceded by Luís Cerqueira	Bishop of Funay; 1618–1633	Succeeded by None
