= St. Joseph the Worker Church (Macau) =

Church in Macau, China

Coordinates: 22°11′50″N 113°32′43″E

- 聖若瑟勞工主保堂; Igreja de São José Operário
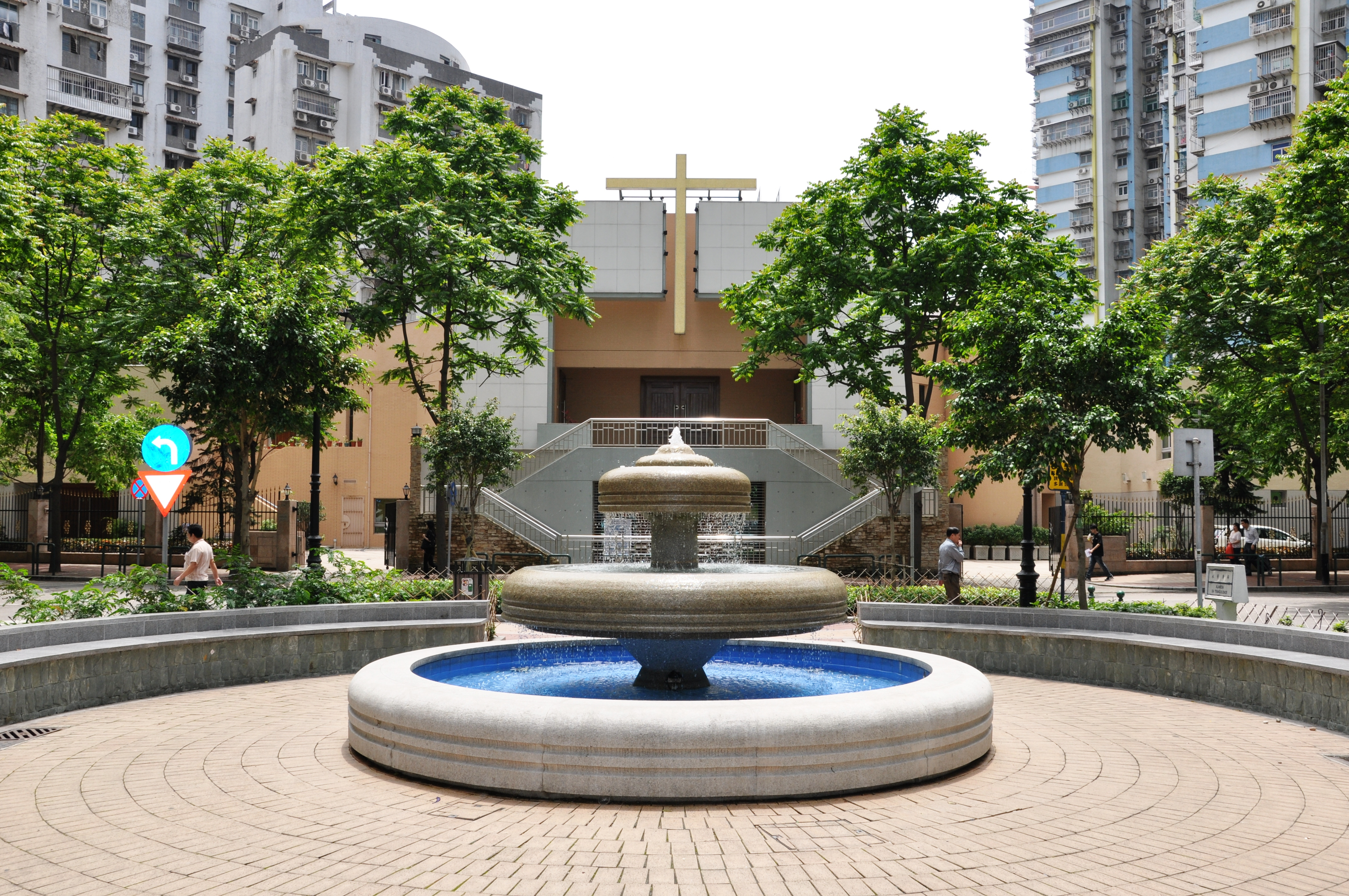
- Façade of the church

Religion
- Affiliation: Roman Catholic
- Status: Active

Location
- Location: Freguesia Nossa Senhora de Fátima, Macau, China
- Interactive map of St. Joseph the Worker Church

Architecture
- Architect: Luis Tomás Piñeiro Nagy
- Type: Church
- Groundbreaking: 1998
- Completed: 1999

The St. Joseph the Worker Church (Chinese: 聖若瑟勞工主保堂; Portuguese: Igreja de São José Operário) is a church in Macau, China; It is part of the freguesia of Our Lady of Fatima, in the district Iao Hon. Begun in 1998, it was completed in 1999.

== Building ==
Inside there are exhibited fourteen oriental icons that represent the main events of Christianity, from Abraham to Pentecost. On the main altar stands a statue of the Holy Family.

This is the main church of the neighborhood and the parish was given from bishop Domingos Lam Ka-tseung to Combonian fathers in 1999.

== See also ==
- Religion in Macau
