= St. Lazarus' Church, Macau =

Church in São Lázaro, Macau, China

Coordinates: 22°11′50″N 113°32′43″E

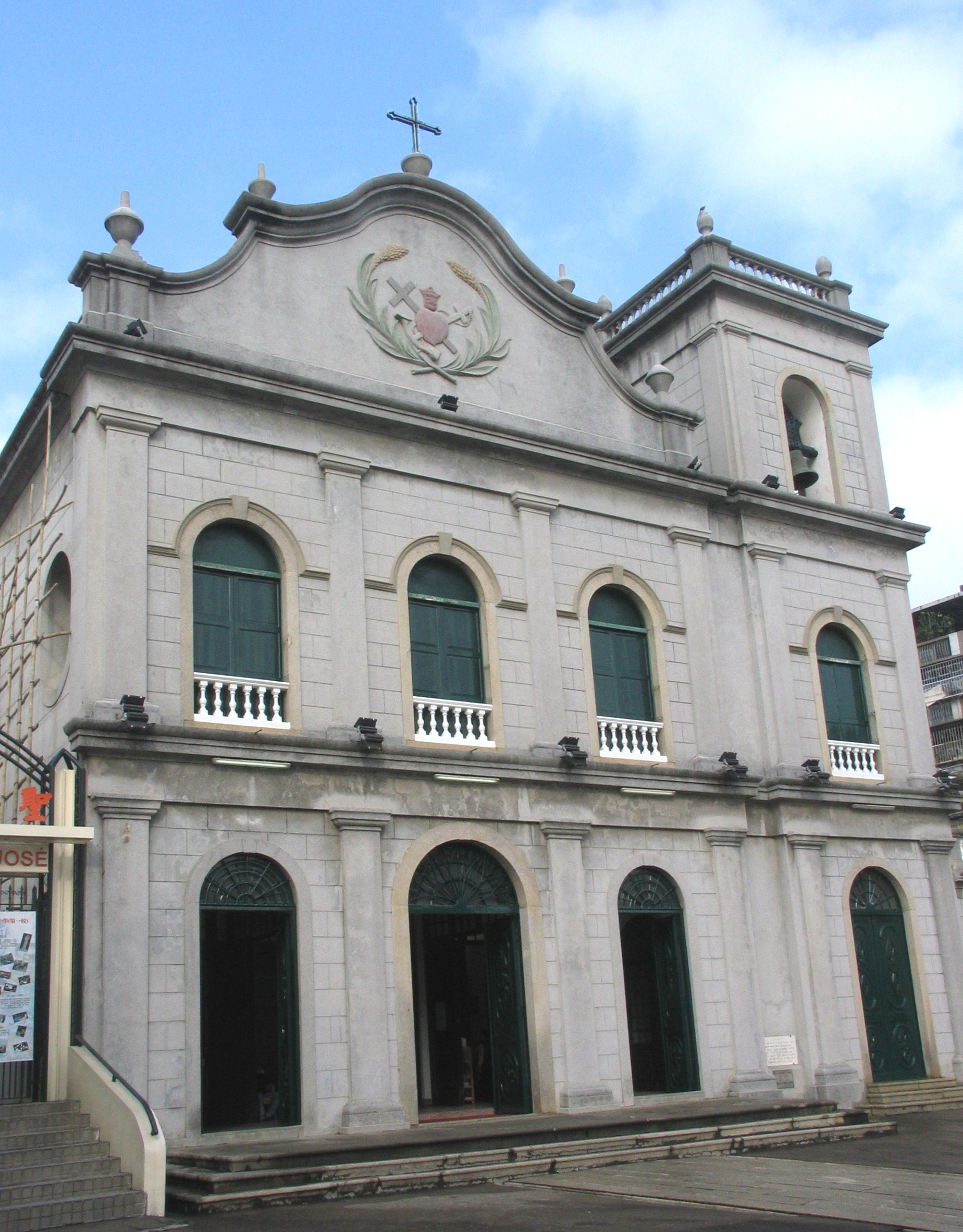
- St. Lazarus' Church

Chinese name
- Traditional Chinese: 望德聖母堂
- Simplified Chinese: 望德圣母堂
Transcriptions
Standard Mandarin
- Hanyu Pinyin: Wàngdé Shèngmǔ Táng
Yue: Cantonese
- Jyutping: mong6 dak1 sing3 mou5 tong4

Portuguese name
- Portuguese: Igreja de São Lázaro

St. Lazarus' Church (Chinese: 望德聖母堂; Portuguese: Igreja de São Lázaro) is a historic church in São Lázaro, Macau, China. Built between 1557 and 1560, it is one of the oldest churches in Macau and located on Rua de João de Almeida. It was built at the site of a hospital for lepers.

The church has been a center of the Chinese Catholic community in Macao since the 19th century.

It currently serves as the main church of the St. Lazarus parish. The church was completely rebuilt in 1885, although the Cross of Hope from the original chapel is located in the forecourt of the current structure.

== Parish Clergy ==
Position	Name	Diocese / Religious Order
Parish Priest	Rev. Canon João Evangelista Lau Him Sang	Diocese of Hong Kong
Assistant Parish Priest	Rev. Fr. Zdzislaw Stanislaw Plawecki	Congregation of the Priests of the Sacred Heart of Jesus

== See also ==
- Religion in Macau
- Catholicism in China
