= Paulo José Tavares =

His Excellency, The Most Reverend Paulo José Tavares
- Bishop of Macau
- Church: Catholic Church
- Diocese: Macau
- Appointed: 24 August 1961
- Installed: 27 November 1961
- Term ended: 12 June 1973
- Predecessor: Policarpo da Costa Vaz
- Successor: Arquimínio Rodrigues da Costa

Orders
- Ordination: 24 April 1943
- Consecration: 21 September 1961 by Amleto Giovanni Cicognani

Personal details
- Born: 25 January 1920 São Miguel Island, Azores, Portugal
- Died: 12 June 1973 (aged 53) Lisbon, Portugal
- Denomination: Roman Catholic
- Parents: José Evaristo Tavares; Maria Luísa de Amaral Tavares
- Motto: Caritas Christi urget nos The love of Christ urges us

Bishop styles of Paulo José Tavares
- Reference style: The Most Reverend
- Spoken style: Your Excellency
- Informal style: Bishop

Ordination history of Paulo José Tavares
History
Priestly ordination
- Ordained by: 24 April 1943
Episcopal consecration
- Principal consecrator: Amleto Giovanni Cicognani
- Co-consecrators: Angelo Dell'Acqua, João Pereira Venâncio

Paulo José Tavares (Chinese: 戴維理; 25 January 1920 – 12 February 1973) was an Azorean-Portuguese Roman Catholic Prelate and Bishop of Macau from 1961 to 1973.

== Biography ==
The son of farmer José Evaristo Tavares and Maria Luísa de Amaral Tavares, he was born on 25 January 1920 in São Miguel Island, which is an island located in the Azores Island, Portugal.

He studied the Canon Law at the Pontifical Gregorian University in Rome from 1941 to 1945, and Pontifical Ecclesiastical Academy from 1945 to 1947. He was ordained priest on 24 April 1943 in the Archbasilica of St. John Lateran. He was incardinated to the Diocese of Angra.

After completing his diplomatic training at the Pontifical Ecclesiastical Academy, he worked for many years at the Secretariat of State of the Holy See between 1947 and 1961, being the first Azorean-Portuguese to hold a position in this important dicastery of the Holy See.

On 24 August 1961, Pope John XXIII appointd Tavares as Bishop of Macau, he was consecrated on 21 September 1961 in the Church of Sant'Antonio dei Portoghesi in Rome by Cardinal Amleto Giovanni Cicognani, the Vatican Secretary of State, together with João Pereira Venâncio, Bishop of Leiria and Angelo Dell'Acqua, Vicar General of Rome, as co-consecrators.

Tavares arrived Macau on 27 November 1961 and take his canonical possession in the Cathedral of the Nativity of Our Lady.

During his episcopate, he promoted the construction and expansion of at least twenty Catholic welfare and educational establishments and created the Council of Catholic Schools (CEC) on 6 March 1967. He had also participated in all the conferences of the Second Vatican Council.

In April 1973, he went to Portugal to participate in the meetings of the Portuguese Episcopal Conference, after the meetings, his health deteriorated considerably and he had to be discharged in the hospital in Lisbon, where he died on 12 June 1973, he was buried in the Rabo de Peixe cemetery in his hometown in Azores.

Catholic Church titles
Preceded by Policarpo da Costa Vaz	Bishop of Macau; 1961-1973	Succeeded by Arquimínio Rodrigues da Costa
