= Escola do Santíssimo Rosário =

Catholic school in Santo António, Macau

聖玫瑰學校 Escola do Santíssimo Rosário
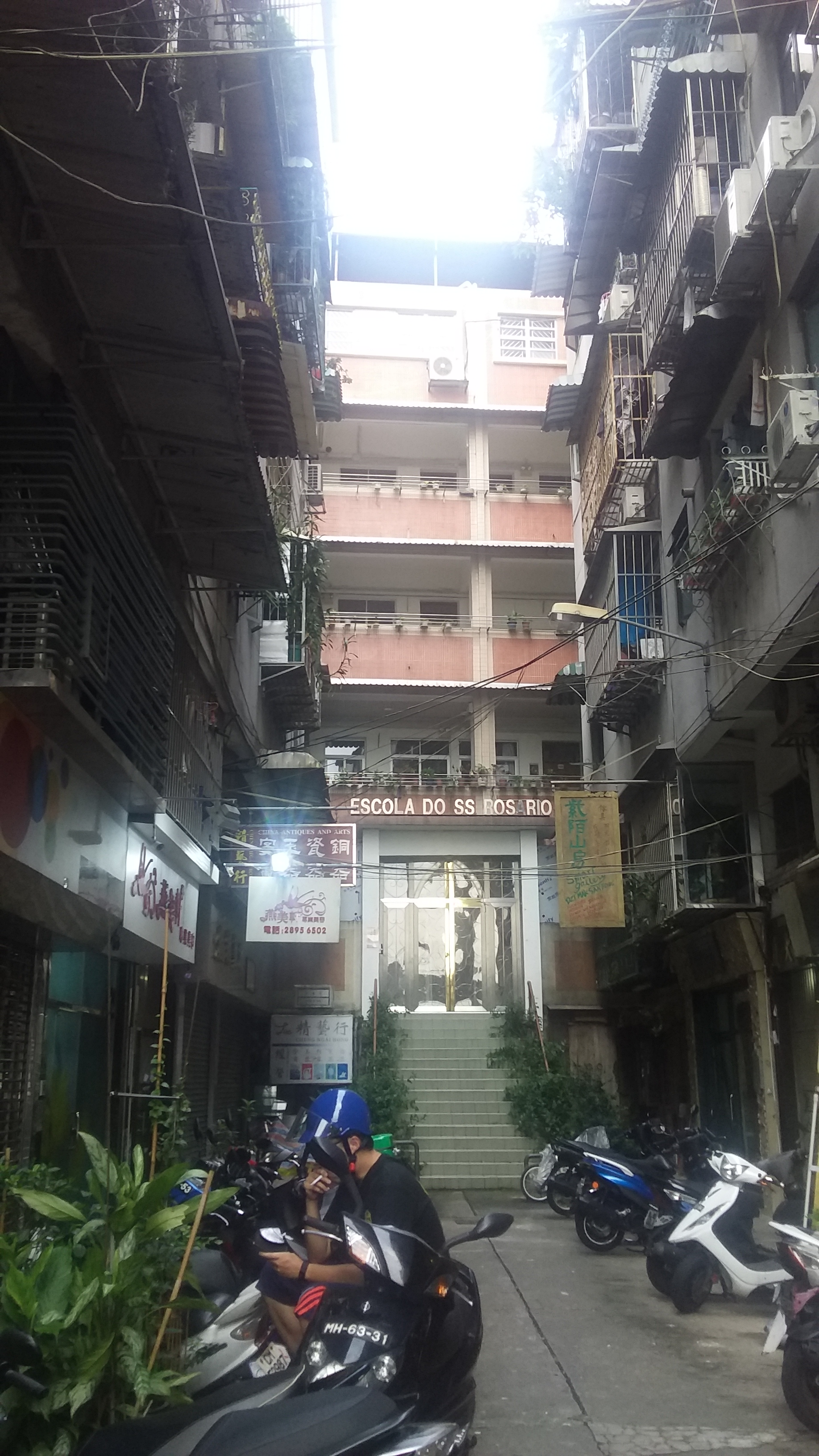
- Largo da Companhia, No. 14, Macau

Information
- Type: Roman Catholic Diocese of Macau
- Established: 1954
- Closed: 2016
- Principal: João Lau
- Website: rosario.edu.mo at the Wayback Machine (archived 2014-12-18)

Escola do Santíssimo Rosário
- Traditional Chinese: 聖玫瑰學校
- Simplified Chinese: 圣玫瑰学校
Transcriptions
Standard Mandarin
- Hanyu Pinyin: Shèng Méiguī Xuéxiào
Yue: Cantonese
- Jyutping: sing3 mui4 gwai3 hok6 haau6

Escola do Santíssimo Rosário (ESSR; "Saint Rosary’s School," Chinese: 聖玫瑰學校) was a Catholic school in Santo António, Macau, serving preschool through junior high school. The Roman Catholic Diocese of Macau operated the school.

== History ==
Established by Father Joaquim Guerra S.J.M it opened at 5 R. das Estalagens (草堆街) in 1954. It was a member of the Macau Catholic Schools Association.

As of June 2016 the projected enrollment of the 2016–2017 school year was about 60 students. At that time the Diocese of Macau announced that the school would close in 2017 due to low enrollment. Jornal Tribuna de Macau reported that the closure on 1 September 2017 came after a controversy over the school's unapproved use of the Montessori method of teaching.
