= Colégio Diocesano de São José 5 =

Private Catholic school in Macau

Coordinates: 22.21141°N 113.54538°E

- Traditional Chinese: 聖若瑟教區中學第五校
- Simplified Chinese: 圣若瑟教区中学第五校
Transcriptions
Standard Mandarin
- Hanyu Pinyin: Shèng Ruòsè Jiàoqū Zhōngxué Dìwǔ Xiào

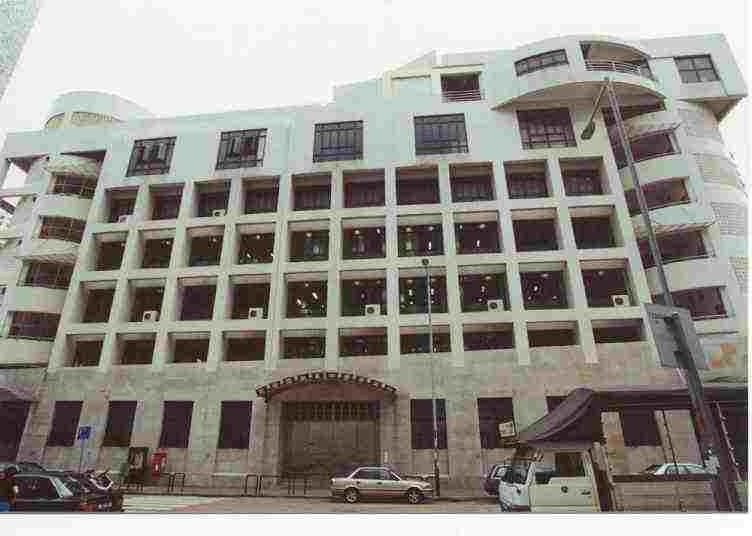

Colégio Diocesano de São José 5 (CDSJ5; Chinese: 聖若瑟教區中學第五校) is a Roman Catholic preschool through secondary school in Nossa Senhora de Fátima (Our Lady of Fatima Parish), Macau. It is operated by the Roman Catholic Diocese of Macau and it is a member of the Macau Catholic Schools Association. The school is not a part of Macau's tuition-free education network.

In 2015 and early 2016 the tuition ranged from 28,900 to 32,200 Macau patacas. As of May 2016 the tuition was to increase to a range of 31,900 to 36,400 patacas. In 2016 several parents protested the tuition hike by sending a letter to Stephen Lee, the Bishop of Macau.
