= O Clarim =

- Traditional Chinese: 號角報
- Simplified Chinese: 号角报
Transcriptions
Standard Mandarin
- Hanyu Pinyin: Hàojiǎobào
Yue: Cantonese
- Jyutping: hou6 gok3 bou3

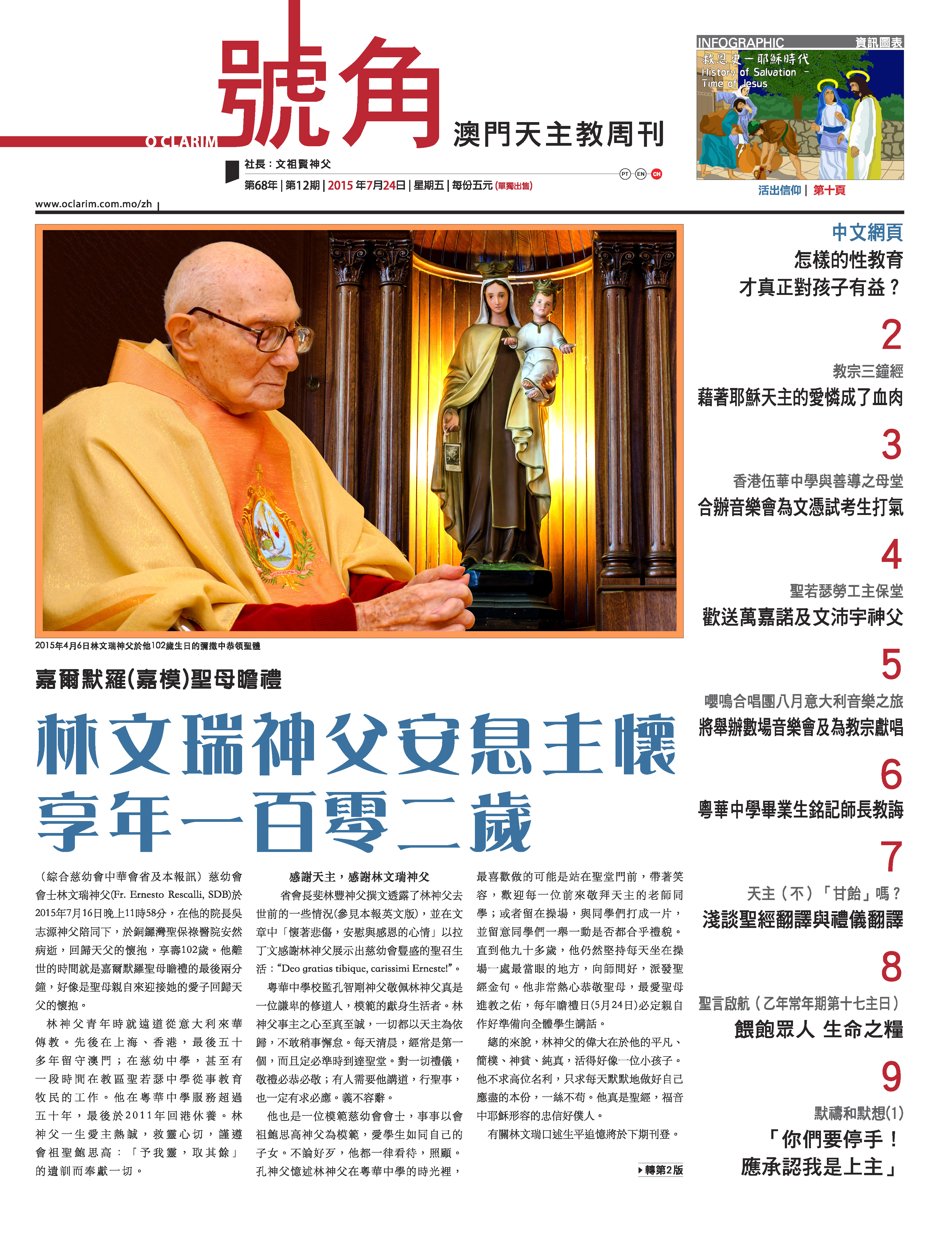
The front page of O Clarim in Chinese, July 24, 2015

Jornal O Clarim (Chinese: 號角報) is a trilingual (Portuguese-English-Chinese) weekly newspaper based in Macau, owned by the Diocese Macau, the oldest continuous Portuguese newspaper in Macau (GCS registration no.1)

Its head office is in Rua Formosa (美麗街) in Sé.
