= Catholic Church in Macau =

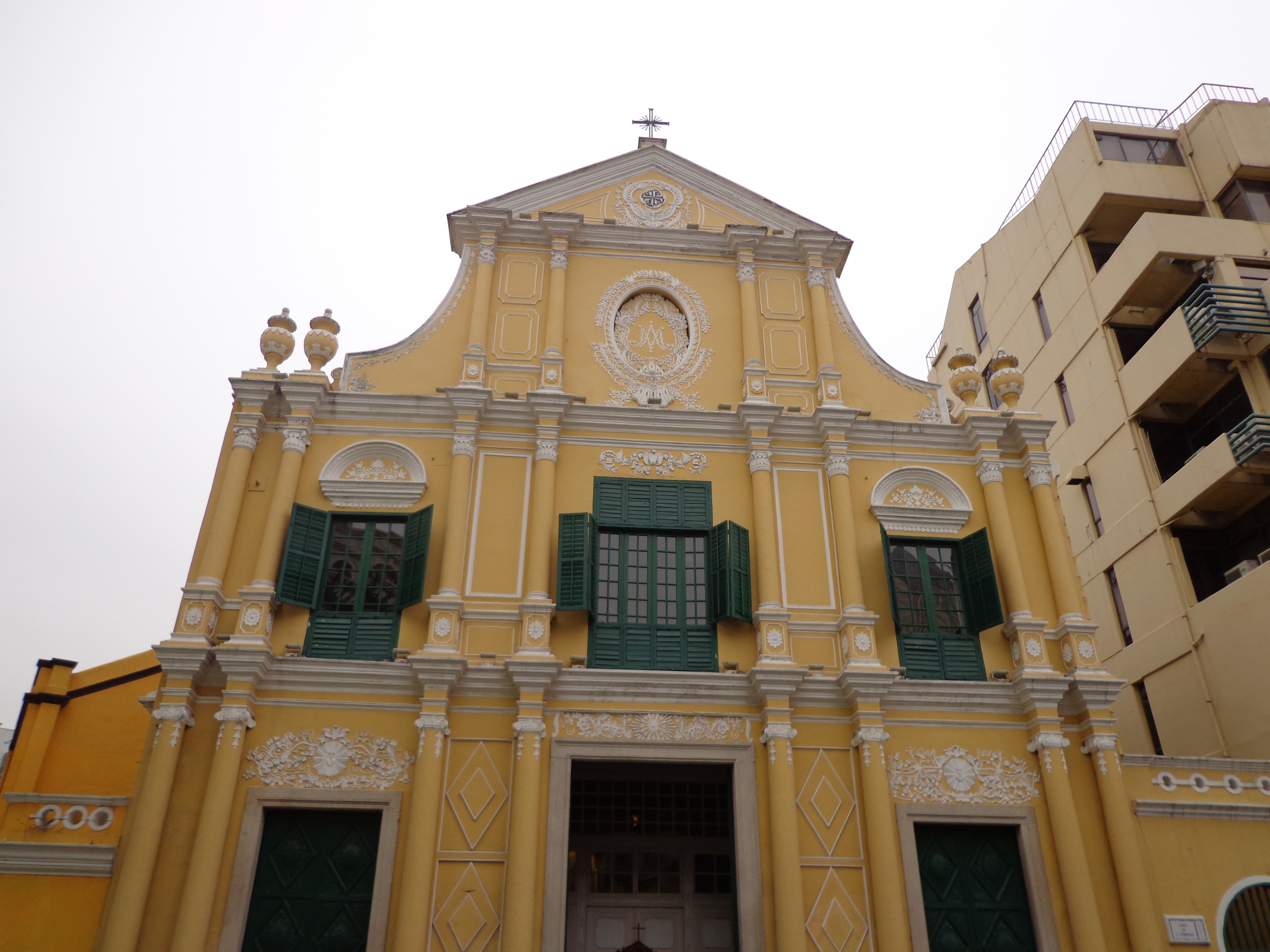
St. Dominic's Church, Macau

The Catholic Church in Macau is part of the worldwide Catholic Church, under the spiritual leadership of the Pope in Rome. The history of Catholic church in Macau can traced back to 1576. The Catholic church in was as rally point for Portuguese entering China and other parts of Asia. The Catholic church within Macau thus played an important role on the spread of Catholicism in Japan, Vietnam and China and other parts of south east Asia.

The Catholic church in Macau has provided schooling, missionary training and preaching the gospel to the local catholic and non-Catholic communities. There are around 30,000 Catholics in Macau (around 5% of the total population), which forms a single diocese, the Diocese of Macau. The current bishop of Macau is Stephen Lee Bun-sang (since 2016).

== History ==
The Macau Diocese was established in 1576 by Pope Gregory XIII, one of the first diocese created in south East Asia. The earliest diocese in south East Asia, the diocese of Beijing was established in mainland China in the Yuan dynasty in 1307 under the order of Pope Clement V. In 1313, Quanzhou Diocese was established. Despite the vigor of the two dioceses, the work in mainland China stalled due to the lack of missionaries.

In early years, the Macau Diocese was the head diocese for major parts of south East Asia, including China, Korea, Japan, Northern Vietnam, and all the islands around South East Asia. Since the establishment of the Macao Diocese, the saints of the Macao Diocese are St. Catherine and St. Francis Xavier of Siena, showing the missionary characteristics of the area In addition to spreading the gospel, the diocese is also responsible for scientific exchanges and research. According to the knowledge and virtue of the papal motto, there is also the responsibility to promote Catholic morality. In addition to the Jesuits, many others established their own institutions in Macau between the 16th and 17th centuries, such as the Franciscans, Augustus, Dominicans, and Sister St. Clair. From the outset, the parish had to obey the appointed colonial leader- the Portuguese Padroado that led to the government over interference in religious affairs and often created friction between the parish and the Portuguese.

== Connection to different parts of Asia ==
The church in colonial Macau was used by missionaries as a starting point to travel to different parts of Southeast Asia. After a long journey from Europe, the missionaries took Macau as an important rest stop. In addition, Macau has also been used as a base for evangelism in Japan, mainland China and other parts of Southeast Asia. For the Jesuits, Macau was an administrative center of the missionary Province of Japan (a large missionary territory which included China, with China becoming a "vice-province" in 1615), more particularly the Diocese of Goa. Macau was an important site for Catholics escaping the persecutions that occurred in Japan during the late 16th and early 17th centuries.

The Franciscans, Dominicans, Augustinians, and the Jesuits have transformed a traditional fishing village into a religious city where named “the City of the Name of God” by King of Portugal John IV in 1640 The pioneer Jesuit to South East Asia Alessandro Valignano, completed most of his establishments in Macau including organizing Jesuit mission to South East Asia and the establishment of a missionary school. In 1594, he founded the St. Paul's College. The college is not only a missionary school, but also a place for cultural and scientific exchanges between Southeast Asia and Europe. It was closed in 1762 when the Jesuits were ordered to disband and expelled from the diocese. In 1835, St. Paul Church, church that was built next to the college was destroyed because of a fire. The church then be gutted by fire twice and never restored. What remains now is the ruins of St. Paul. Its facade has become a symbol of Macau.

== Pioneer missionary to mainland China ==
In 1583, Michele Ruggieri and Matteo Ricci were dispatched by Alessandro Valignano from Macau to mainland China, trying to reverse the long failing missionary mission. In 1576, Pope Gregory XIII separated Macau from the Malacca and empowered the diocese with jurisdiction over most of South East Asia including Japan, China and the islands close by. The jurisdiction was then shrunk by the erection the diocese in Japan and mainland China, yet these dioceses were short lived. In 1588, the diocese of Funai was established in Japan. In 1690, Beijing and Nanjing dioceses were established in mainland China. In 1710, the imprison papal legate Charles-Thomas Maillard de Tournon died in Macau. After his unsuccessful trip to China trying to settle the controversial conflicts between Chinese traditions and catholic beliefs. The Arrival of Protestant Missionaries. In 1807 the first Protestant missionary arriving in Macau Robert Morrison. His work of translating the Bible into Chinese was a huge boost in promoting Christianity in China. In 1819 the first ever Chinese bible was completed From the very beginning, Catholic churches opposed the new coming Protestant. Today the Protestant community in Macau remains small.

== Contemporary ==
After the 12-3 incident, the Catholic Church's political influence in Macau declined.

In 1987, Macau's first Chinese bishop, Domingos Ka-tseung Lam, was appointed.

After 400 years, the size of the Macau diocese has reduced as different dioceses were established in areas of mainland China yet the numbers of organization and institution set up by the catholic church of Macau have grown and developed. The jurisdiction of the Macao Diocese covers the territory of Macao with 9 parishes. Each parish is led by a Dean nominated by the bishop of Macau. There are a total 31 educational institutions, and 23 social service institutions established and run by different parishes. What's more, it also has a social exchange center, publishing agency and pastoral center for teenagers and elders. There are about 80 priests and brother, 199 sisters in the diocese.

=== Connection to society ===
Historically, through Catholicism's association with the colonial Portuguese administration, the religion has been a source of social capital and economic benefits for Chinese Catholics in Macau. As Portuguese dominance over Macau began declining, a process that started in the 1970s, these benefits also declined.

Members of the Catholic church have been active on certain issues of social reform: for e.g., Sister Juliana Devoy was an advocate against domestic violence and for legal reform in Macau, the Macau diocese has established drug rehabilitation centers, and Reverend Lancelote M. Rodrigues worked for the rehabilitation of refugees in Macau.

Churches in Macau:

- Cathedral
- St. Lazarus Church
- St. Anthony's Church
- St. Lawrence's Church
- Our Lady of Fatíma's Church
- Our Lady of Mount Carmel's Church
- St. Francis Xavier's Church
- St. Francis Xavier's Church (Coloane)
- St. Joseph the Worker's Church
- St. Dominic's Church
- St. Augustine's Church

Chinese Catholics in Macau often adopt a Portuguese given name (and sometimes a Portuguese family name as well) after Baptism.

=== Catholic Schooling ===
There are currently 25 high schools, 2 missionary school, 1 university and 1 conservatory run by the Catholic Church in Macau. Most of them are originally established by Catholic church and run until now. The earliest school established is a missionary school in 1594 The St. Paul college. In 1728 the St.Joseph college was established by the Jesuits an attempt to increase the number of missionary. During the stay in the missionary school the trainees has to learn much more only than gospel. Therefore, the St.Paul college and the St Joseph has cultivated the first bunches of bilingual speakers. Added to that the compile of dictionary and the creation of a brand new Chinese-English learning method had laid the foundation of running schools. In modern times Catholic schools are facing different challenges as Catholic church tries implement the rather conservative old fashioned Catholic principle into education against the new generation and the gradually raising open minded society. Added on that Catholic education in Macau is operating in a city that catholic is no longer the mainstream religion and it has highly commercialized.

Schools currently run by Catholic church
Names in Portuguese	English translation
Colégio Diocesano de São José	St. Joseph Secondary School
Colégio Diocesano de São José (Quinto Edifício)	St. Joseph Secondary School (5)
Colégio Diocesano de São José (Sexta escola)	St. Joseph Secondary School (6)
Escola São Paulo	Saint Paul School
Escola de Santa Teresa do Menino Jesus	Santa Teresa School
Escola de Santa Madalena	Santa Madalena School
Escola Dom João Paulino	Bishop João Paulino School
Colégio Mateus Ricci	Mateus Ricci College
Colégio Estrela do Mar	
Instituto Salesiano	
Colégio Yuet Wah	Yuet Wah College
Colégio Dom Bosco (Yuet Wah)	College of Bishop Bosco (Yuet Wah)
Escola D. Luís Versiglia-Ká Hó	D. Luís Versiglia-Ká Hó School
Colégio do Sagrado Coração de Jesus (Chinese Section)	Sacred Heart Canossian College (Chinese Section)
Colégio do Sagrado Coração de Jesus (English Section)	Sacred Heart Canossian College (English Section)
Colégio de Santa Rosa de Lima (Chinese Section)	Santa Rosa de Lima College (Chinese Section)
Colégio de Santa Rosa de Lima (English Section)	Santa Rosa de Lima College (English Section)
Colégio do Perpétuo Socorro Chan Sui Ki	Chan Sui Ki Perpetual Help College
Colégio do Perpétuo Socorro Chan Sui Ki (Sucursal)	Chan Sui Ki Perpetual Help College ( Branch )
Escola de São José, Ká-Hó	Ka-Ho St. Jose School
Escola de Santa Maria Mazzarello	Santa Maria Mazzarello School
Escola de Nossa Senhora de Fátima	Our Lady of Fatima Girls' School
Escola da Sagrada Família	Santa Family School
Seminário Diocesano de São José	St. Joseph's Seminary
Universidade de São José	University of St Joseph
Academia de Música São Pio X	St Pio X Academy of Music

== See also ==
- Catholic Church in China
- Catholic Church in Hong Kong
- Catholic Church in Taiwan
- Religion in Macau
- Procession of the Bom Jesus dos Passos in Macau
