= Domingos Lam =

Chinese-born bishop

His Excellency, The Most Reverend Domingos Lam Ka-tseung GLM
- Bishop of Macau
- Church: Roman Catholic Church
- Diocese: Macau
- Installed: 6 October 1988
- Term ended: 30 June 2003
- Predecessor: Arquimínio Rodrigues da Costa
- Successor: José Lai
- Previous post: Coadjutor Bishop of Macau (1987–1988)

Orders
- Ordination: 27 December 1953
- Consecration: 8 September 1987 by Arquimínio Rodrigues da Costa

Personal details
- Born: 9 April 1928 British Hong Kong
- Died: 27 July 2009 (aged 81) Macau
- Buried: São Miguel Arcanjo Cemetery, Macau
- Denomination: Roman Catholic
- Education: St. Joseph's Seminary and Church
- Coat of arms: Domingos Lam Ka-tseung's coat of arms

Styles of Domingos Lam Ka-tseung
- Reference style: His Excellency; The Most Reverend
- Spoken style: Your Excellency
- Religious style: Bishop

Domingos Lam
- Chinese: 林家駿
- Cantonese Yale: Làhm Gāa Dzeun
Transcriptions
Standard Mandarin
- Hanyu Pinyin: Lín Jiājùn
- Wade–Giles: Lin Chia-chün
- Yale Romanization: Lín Jyājyùn
- IPA: [lǐn tɕjátɕŷn]
Yue: Cantonese
- Yale Romanization: Làhm Gāa Dzeun
- Jyutping: Lam4 Gaa1 Zeon3
- IPA: [lɐ̏m káː tsœ̄n]

Ordination history of Domingos Lam
History
Priestly ordination
- Date: 27 December 1953
- Place: Portuguese Macau
Episcopal consecration
- Principal consecrator: Arquimínio Rodrigues da Costa (Macau)
- Co-consecrators: James Chan Soon Cheong (Malacca-Johor); John Baptist Wu (Hong Kong)
- Date: 8 September 1987
- Place: Cathedral of the Nativity of Our Lady, Macau
Episcopal succession
Bishops consecrated by Domingos Lam as principal consecrator
- José Lai: 2 June 2001

Domingos Lam Ka Tseung GOIH GCIH GOC GLM (Chinese: 林家駿; 9 April 1928 – 27 July 2009) was the first Chinese-born bishop (in Hong Kong then under British sovereignty) in the Roman Catholic Diocese of Macau. On 26 May 1987, he was appointed Coadjutor Bishop of Macau and succeeded Arquimínio Rodrigues da Costa, the last Portuguese bishop, on 6 October 1988 upon Rodrigues' resignation. He resigned on 30 June 2003, and died aged 81 in 2009.

Catholic Church titles
Vacant Title last held by Jerónimo da Mata	Coadjutor Bishop of Macau; 1987–1988	Vacant Title next held by José Lai
Preceded by Arquimínio Rodrigues da Costa	Bishop of Macau; 1988–2003	Succeeded by José Lai
