= Stephen Lee (bishop) =

Hongkonger Catholic prelate

His Excellency, The Most Reverend Stephen Lee Bun-sang Opus Dei
- Bishop of Macau
- Church: Roman Catholic Church
- See: Macau
- Installed: 16 January 2016
- Predecessor: José Lai Hung-seng
- Other post: Rector of the Cathedral of the Nativity of Our Lady
- Previous posts: Auxiliary Bishop of Hong Kong (2014–2016); Titular Bishop of Novae (2014–2016)

Orders
- Ordination: 20 August 1988
- Consecration: 30 August 2014 by John Tong Hon

Personal details
- Born: 10 November 1956 (age 69) British Hong Kong
- Denomination: Roman Catholic
- Residence: Macau
- Education: University of Navarra
- Motto: Ut omnes unum sint (English: That they all may be one)
- Coat of arms

Styles of Stephen Lee Bun-sang
- Reference style: His Excellency; The Most Reverend
- Spoken style: Your Excellency
- Religious style: Bishop

Ordination history of Stephen Lee
History
Priestly ordination
- Date: 20 August 1988
- Place: Torreciudad, Huesca, Spain
Episcopal consecration
- Principal consecrator: John Tong Hon (Hong Kong)
- Co-consecrators: Joseph Zen (Hong Kong em.); Savio Hon (Sec. Sacr. Cong. Prop. Fide)
- Date: 30 August 2014
- Place: Cathedral of the Immaculate Conception, Hong Kong

Stephen Lee Bun-sang (born 10 November 1956, in Hong Kong; in Chinese: 李斌生; pinyin: Lǐ bīnshēng) is a Hongkonger Catholic prelate who has served as Bishop of Macau since 2016.

Lee entered the priesthood in 1988 and became Auxiliary Bishop of Hong Kong in 2014. He is a numerary of Opus Dei.

== Early life ==
Lee was born and raised in Hong Kong. He was baptized as Roman Catholic on 24 July 1976. He received his Bachelor in Architectural Studies in England. Lee went back to Hong Kong to start up his profession as architect.

== Presbyterial ministry ==
After joining Opus Dei as a Numerary Member in 1978, Lee went to Rome for his studies in Philosophy and Theology. He was ordained priest on 20 August 1988 in the Shrine of Torreciudad, Spain. In 1990, he received his Doctorate in Canon Law in the University of Navarra, Spain.

As a priest of Opus Dei, his pastoral assignment is preaching the retreat, giving spiritual direction for the members of Opus Dei.

Until 2014, Lee served as supervisor of Tak Sun School in Kowloon. He was also the Opus Dei Regional Vicar of East Asia and the Defender of the Diocesan Magisterial Court.

== Episcopal ministry ==
On 11 July 2014, Pope Francis appointed Lee as one of the three Auxiliary Bishops of Hong Kong, alongside Michael Yeung and Joseph Ha. He received his episcopal ordination on 30 August 2014 by Cardinal John Tong Hon, Bishop of Hong Kong.

On 16 January 2016, Pope Francis accepted the resignation from the Bishop of Macau, José Lai Hung Seng. Pope Francis then appointed Bishop Lee as the next Bishop of Macau. He was officially installed on 23 January 2016 during the Solemn Holy Mass for the 440th Anniversary of the Establishment of the Diocese of Macau.

Aside from the Bishop of Macau, he is also the Rector of the Cathedral of the Nativity of Our Lady in Macau.

== See also ==
- List of bishops of Macau
- Diocese of Macau
- Opus Dei

Catholic Church titles
| Vacant Title last held by John Tong Hon | Auxiliary Bishop of Hong Kong; 2014–2016; With: Michael Yeung (2014–2016); Joseph Ha (2014–2016) | Succeeded by — |
| Preceded by José Lai Hung-seng | Bishop of Macau; 2016–present | Incumbent |
| Preceded by Mihai Frățilă | — TITULAR — Bishop of Novae; 2014–2016 | Succeeded by Ducange Sylvain |
