= Arquimínio Rodrigues da Costa =

Portuguese prelate

His Excellency, The Most Reverend Arquimínio Rodrigues da Costa
- Diocese: Macau
- Appointed: 20 January 1976
- Installed: 25 March 1976
- Term ended: 6 October 1988
- Predecessor: Paulo José Tavares
- Successor: Domingos Lam

Orders
- Ordination: 6 October 1949
- Consecration: 25 March 1976 by John Baptist Wu

Personal details
- Born: 8 July 1924 São Mateus, Azores Islands
- Died: 12 September 2016 (aged 92) São Mateus, Azores
- Denomination: Roman Catholic Church

Ordination history of Arquimínio Rodrigues da Costa
History
Episcopal consecration
- Principal consecrator: John Baptist Wu (Hong Kong)
- Co-consecrators: Julio Xavier Labayen (Infanta); Charles-Joseph Lemaire (Otrus tit.)
Episcopal succession
Bishops consecrated by Arquimínio Rodrigues da Costa as principal consecrator
- Domingos Lam: 8 September 1987

Styles of Arquimínio Rodrigues da Costa
- Reference style: His Excellency; The Most Reverend
- Spoken style: Your Excellency
- Religious style: Bishop

Arquimínio Rodrigues da Costa (8 July 1924 – 12 September 2016) was a Portuguese prelate of the Catholic Church. He was bishop of the Diocese of Macau from 1976 to 1988.

== Biography ==
Arquimínio Rodrigues da Costa, a native of São Mateus, Pico, Azores, entered the seminary of Macau in 1938 and was ordained a priest on 6 October 1949. In February 1955, he was appointed rector of this seminary.

On 20 January 1976, Pope Paul VI appointed him bishop of Macau. He was ordained bishop on 25 March 1976. On 6 October 1988, he resigned from this post. He received the Grand Cross of the Order of Merit of the Portuguese Republic in November 1988. After this, he worked in the Diocese while his health allowed him.

Catholic Church titles
Preceded by Paulo José Tavares	Bishop of Macau; 1976–1988	Succeeded by Domingos Lam
