= Cathedral of the Nativity of Our Lady, Macau =

Church in Sé, Macau, China

Coordinates: 22°11′37″N 113°32′30″E

Cathedral of the Nativity of Our Lady
- Sé Catedral da Natividade de Nossa Senhora
- 聖母誕辰主教座堂/澳門主教座堂
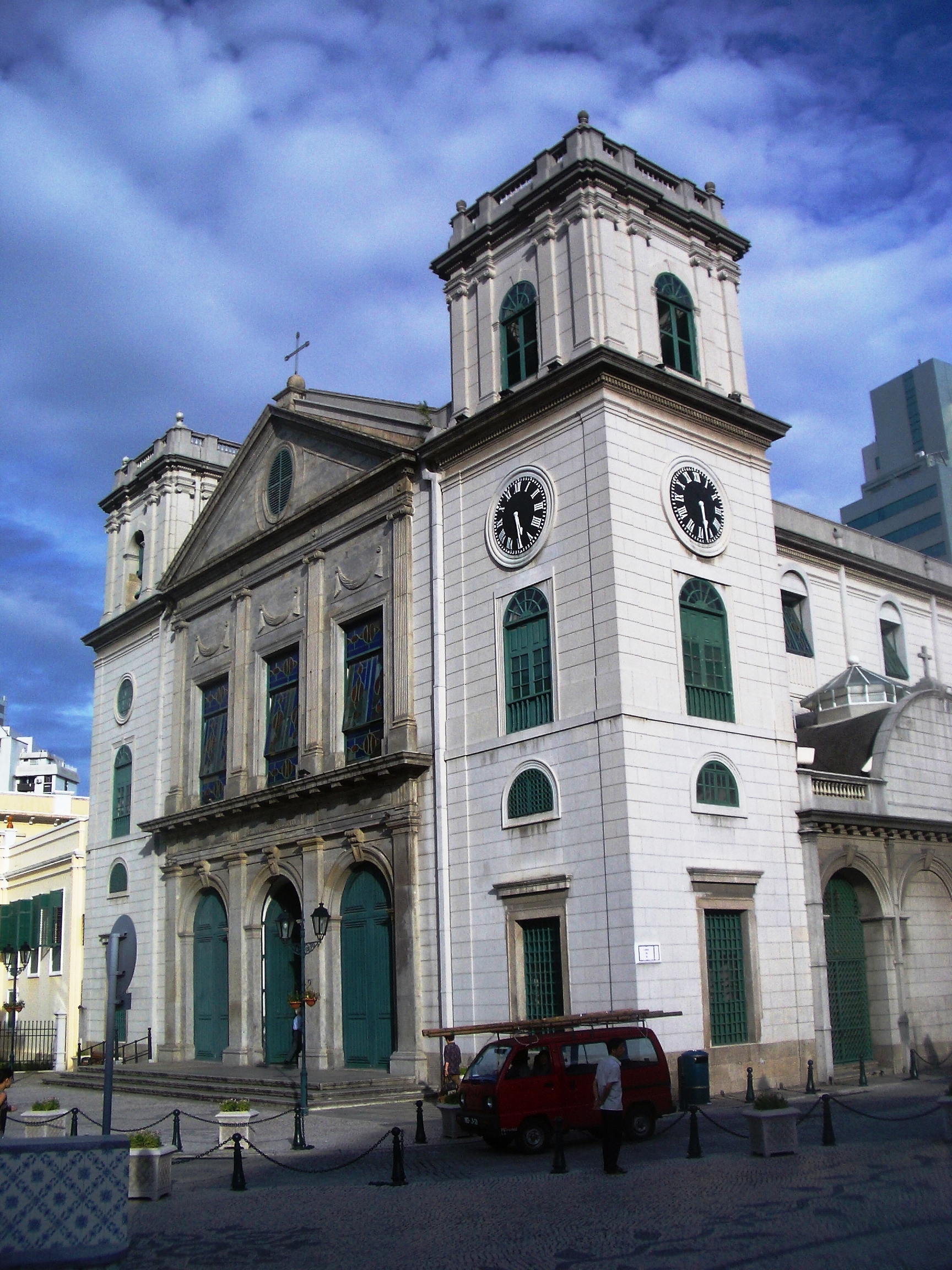
- Sé Catedral da Natividade de Nossa Senhora
- Cathedral of the Nativity of Our Lady
- Location: Sé, Concelho de Macau
- Country: Macau

Architecture
- Completed: 1937
- Construction cost: MOP100,900

Administration
- Diocese: Macau

Clergy
- Bishop: Stephen Lee
- Rector: Stephen Lee

The Cathedral of the Nativity of Our Lady also Sé Catedral da Natividade de Nossa Senhora and Igreja da Sé (Chinese: 澳門主教座堂) is a Roman Catholic cathedral in Sé, Macau. It is the current cathedral of the Diocese of Macau. The cathedral is also called the "Church of the Nativity of Our Lady".

The cathedral is included in the list of historical monuments of the Historic Centre of Macau, which in turn is included in the list of World Heritage Sites in China.

== History ==
1623

In the early seventeenth century it was a small wooden chapel, and was elevated to cathedral only in 1623. Before 1623, the Diocese was headquartered in the St. Lazarus' Church.

1850

The first cathedral built in stone, consecrated in 1850 by the then Bishop of Macau, Jerónimo José da Mata, was almost destroyed in a typhoon 24 years later, after having undergone major repairs.

1937

The cathedral was completely rebuilt in concrete in 1937, costing approximately 100,900 patacas.

== Cathedral Clergy ==
Position	Name	Diocese / Religious Order
Cathedral Rector	H. E. Bishop Stephen Lee	Prelature of Opus Dei / Diocese of Macau
Assistant Parish Priest	Rev. Fr. Daniel Antonio de Carvalho Ribeiro	Dehonians Missionaries
Assistant Parish Priest	Rev. Fr. Sheldon Eric D'Souza	Neocatechumenal Way / Diocese of Macau
Chaplain of the English Community	Rev. Fr. Leonardo Espena Dollentas	Military Ordinariate of the Philippines

== Service area ==
The service area of the cathedral is the second largest parish in the Peninsula of Macau, including New Road, South Bay and Outer Harbour Terminals in the lobby area.

== See also ==
- Religion in Macau
- Procession of the Bom Jesus dos Passos in Macau
