= Diocese of Macau =

Catholic diocese covering Macau

Coordinates: 22.1936°N 113.5420°E

Diocese of Macau Dioecesis Macaonensis 天主教澳門教區
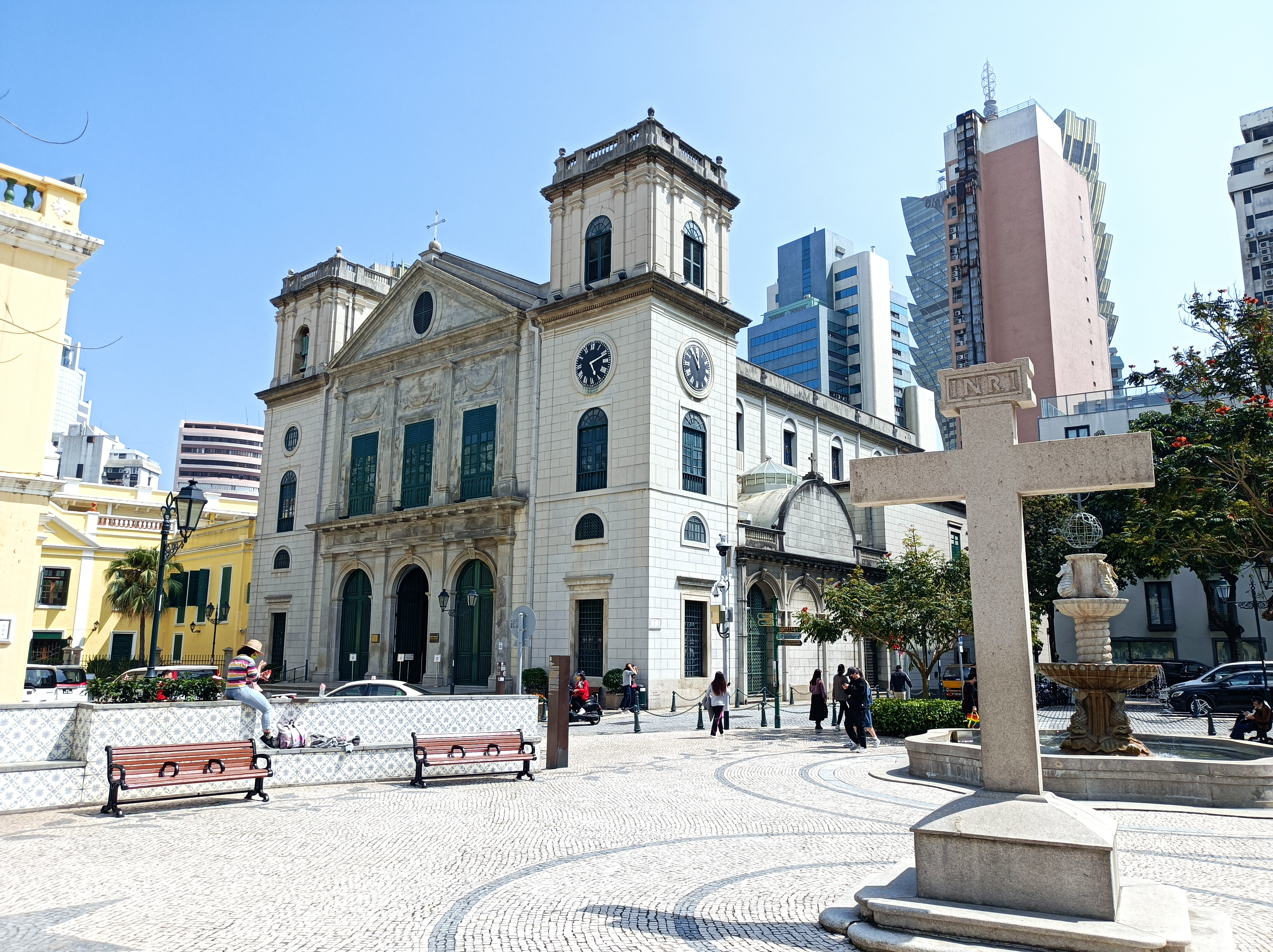
- Cathedral of the Nativity of Our Lady

Location
- Territory: Macau

Statistics
- Area: 30 km^{2} (12 sq mi)
- Population: Total; Catholics: (as of 2013); 582,000; 29,611 (5.1%)

Information
- Denomination: Catholic Church
- Sui iuris church: Latin Church
- Rite: Roman Rite
- Cathedral: Cathedral of the Nativity of Our Lady

Current leadership
- Pope: Leo XIV
- Bishop: Stephen Lee Bun-sang
- Vicar General: Father Pedro Chung

Website
- catholic.org.mo

Diocese of Macau

Chinese name
- Traditional Chinese: 天主教澳門教區
- Simplified Chinese: 天主教澳门教区
Transcriptions
Standard Mandarin
- Hanyu Pinyin: Tiānzhǔjiào Àomén Jiàoqū
Yue: Cantonese
- Jyutping: tin1 zyu2 gaau3 ou3 mun4*2 gaau3 keoi1

Portuguese name
- Portuguese: Diocese de Macau

The Diocese of Macau (Portuguese: Diocese de Macau; Chinese: 天主教澳門教區; Jyutping: tin1 zyu2 gaau3 ou3 mun4 gaau3 keoi1) is a Latin Church exempt ecclesiastical territory or diocese of the Catholic Church, in contrast with the Diocese of Hong Kong, which is, de jure, part of the Ecclesiastical Province of Guangdong.

The territory of the Diocese of Macau encompasses Macau, a special administrative region of China. In theory, a part of Guangdong province also belongs to the diocese, but in practice, the diocese is limited to Macau.

Its cathedral is the Cathedral of the Nativity of Our Lady.

Its patron saints are Francis Xavier and Catherine of Siena, and its motto is Scientia et Virtus (Knowledge and Virtue).

Stephen Lee Bun-sang is the current bishop and the third ethnically Chinese bishop of the diocese.

== History ==
It was established on January 23, 1576, by the edict of Pope Gregory XIII, on vast territory split off from Roman Catholic Diocese of Malacca. It originally covered China, Japan, Vietnam and the Malay Archipelago, with the exception of the Philippines. From its founding, the diocese was a suffragan diocese of the Archdiocese (soon Patriarchate) of Goa, in Portuguese India.

It gradually lost most of its territory, in and around continental China:

- on February 19, 1588, to establish the Diocese of Funai (Japan)
- on September 9, 1659, Pope Alexander VII issued the papal bull Super cathedram principis apostolorum to establish and define the jurisdiction of the Apostolic Vicariate of Tonkin (Northern Vietnam, Laos and five adjacent provinces of southern China: Yunnan, Guizhou, Huguang, Sichuan, Guangxi), the Apostolic Vicariate of Cochinchina (Central Vietnam and five provinces of southeastern China: Zhejiang, Fujian, Guangdong, Jiangxi, Hainan), and Apostolic Vicariate of Nanjing (including five adjacent provinces: Beijing, Shanxi, Shandong, Korea and Tartary).
- In 1696, Pope Innocent XII returned the provinces of Guangdong and Guangxi, and the island of Hainan to its authority.
- on April 22, 1841, to establish the then-Apostolic Prefecture of Hong Kong
- on May 10, 1848, to establish the then-Apostolic Vicariate of Guangdong-Guangxi including Hainan
- on April 9, 1940, to establish the Diocese of Díli (on Timor)

It was made exempt in 1975, following Portugal's loss of sovereignty over Goa, its former metropolitan.

It now only administers Macau alone, the last regions outside Macau under its administration were the parishes of Saint Joseph in Singapore (re-united with the Roman Catholic Archdiocese of Singapore c. 1972) and St. Peter's Church in Malacca (now as part of Roman Catholic Diocese of Malacca-Johor), which separated from the Diocese of Macau in 1981.

== Bishops ==
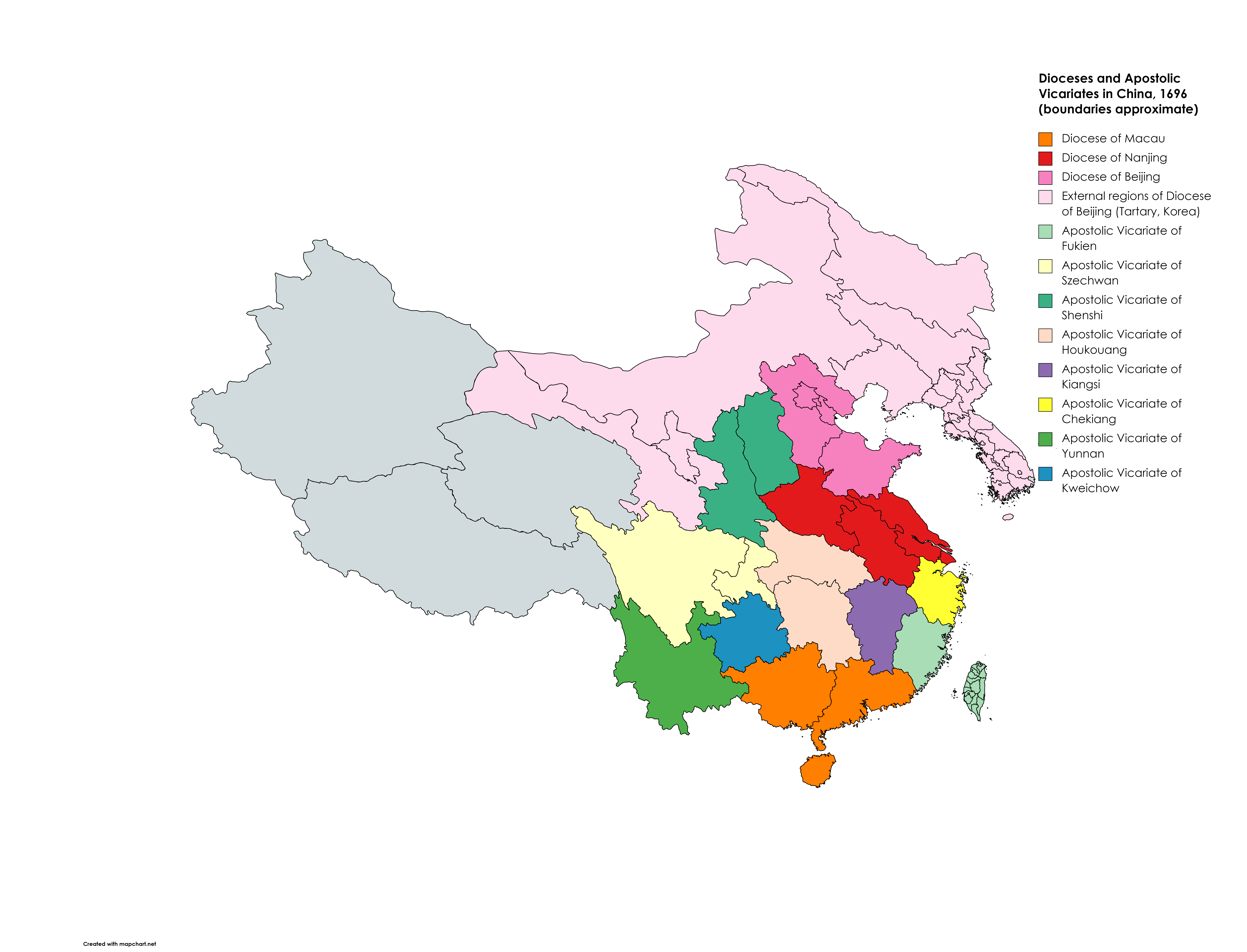
Dioceses and Apostolic Vicariates in China, 1696

=== Bishops of Macau ===
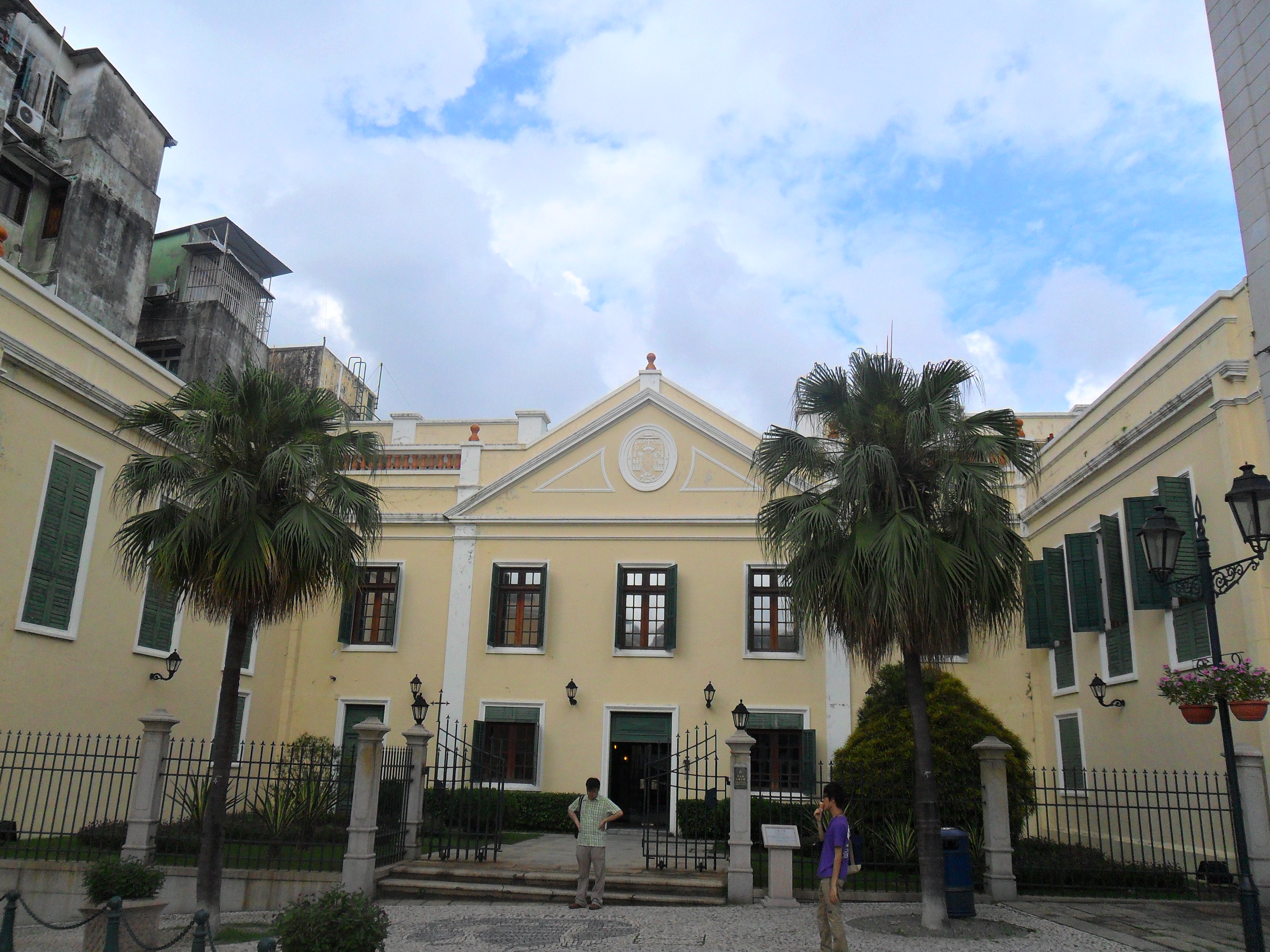
The Bishop's House

- Diego Núñez de Figueroa (1576–1578); rejected appointment, never consecrated
  - Melchior Carneiro (1576–1581), administrator
- Leonardo Fernandes de Sá, O.Cist. (1578–1597), arrived at Macau in 1581
  - Father Manuel de Aguiar (1597–1599), administrator
  - Father Miguel dos Santos, O.S.A. (1599–1607), administrator
- João de Abrantes a Pietate, O.P. (1604–1623), resigned and returned to Europe in 1615, resignation accepted in 1623
  - Father Antonio de Rosario (1615–1623), de facto administrator
  - Diogo Correia Valente (1623–1633), administrator

from 1641 to 1668, no bishops were named due to the Portuguese Restoration War between Spain and Portugal

- Father Bento de Christo (1640–1642), administrator
- Father Francisco de S. Thomaz, named by Peter II of Portugal in 1669 but not confirmed by the Pope
- Father Giovanni Filippo de Marini (also Filippe de Marino) (1671–1677), administrator

- João de Casal (1690–1735)
- Eugénio de Trigueiros, O.E.S.A. (1735–1740), appointed Archbishop of Goa
- Hilário de Santa Rosa, O.F.M. (1740–1752)
- Bartolomeu Manoel Mendes dos Reis (1753–1773), appointed Bishop of Mariana
- Alexandre da Silva Pedrosa Guimarães (1773–1789)
- Marcelino José da Silva (1789–1802)
- Manuel de Santo Galdino, O.F.M. (1802–1804), appointed Coadjutor Archbishop and later Archbishop of Goa
- Francisco Chachim, O.F.M. Disc. (1804–1828)
- Nicolaus Rodrigues Pereira de Borja, C.M. (1843–1845)
- Jerónimo José de Mata, C.M. (1845–1862)
- Pereira Botelho do Amaral e Pimentel (1866–1871), appointed Bishop of Angra
- Manuel Bernardo de Sousa Enes (1874–1883), appointed Bishop of Bragança e Miranda and later Bishop of Portalegre
- António Joaquim de Medeiros (1884–1897)
- José Manuel de Carvalho (1897–1902), appointed Bishop of Angra
- João Paulino de Azevedo e Castro (鮑理諾) (1902–1918)
- José da Costa Nunes (1920–1940), appointed Archbishop of Goa and Daman (elevated to Cardinal in 1962)
- João de Deus Ramalho, S.J. (1942–1953)
- Policarpo da Costa Vaz (1954–1960), appointed Bishop of Guarda
- Paulo José Tavares (1961–1973)
- Arquimínio Rodrigues da Costa (1976–1988)
- Domingos Lam Ka-tseung (1988–2003)
- José Lai Hung-seng (2003–2016)
- Stephen Lee Bun-sang (2016–present)

=== Coadjutor bishops ===
- José Lai Hung-seng (2001–2003)
- Domingos Lam Ka Tseung (1987–1988)
- Jerónimo José de Mata, C.M. (1844–1845)
- Eugénio Trigueiros, O.S.A. (1725–1735)

== Parishes ==
The diocese is divided in:

- six parishes (five in Macau Peninsula and one on Taipa island):
  - Cathedral Parish
  - St. Lazarus
  - St. Anthony
  - St. Lawrence
  - Our Lady of Fátima
  - Church of Our Lady of Carmel, Taipa
- two quasi-parishes, both on Macau Peninsula:
  - St. Francis Xavier, Mong Há
  - St. Joseph, Iao Hon
- one mission (on Coloane island):
  - St. Francis Xavier, Coloane

== Schools ==
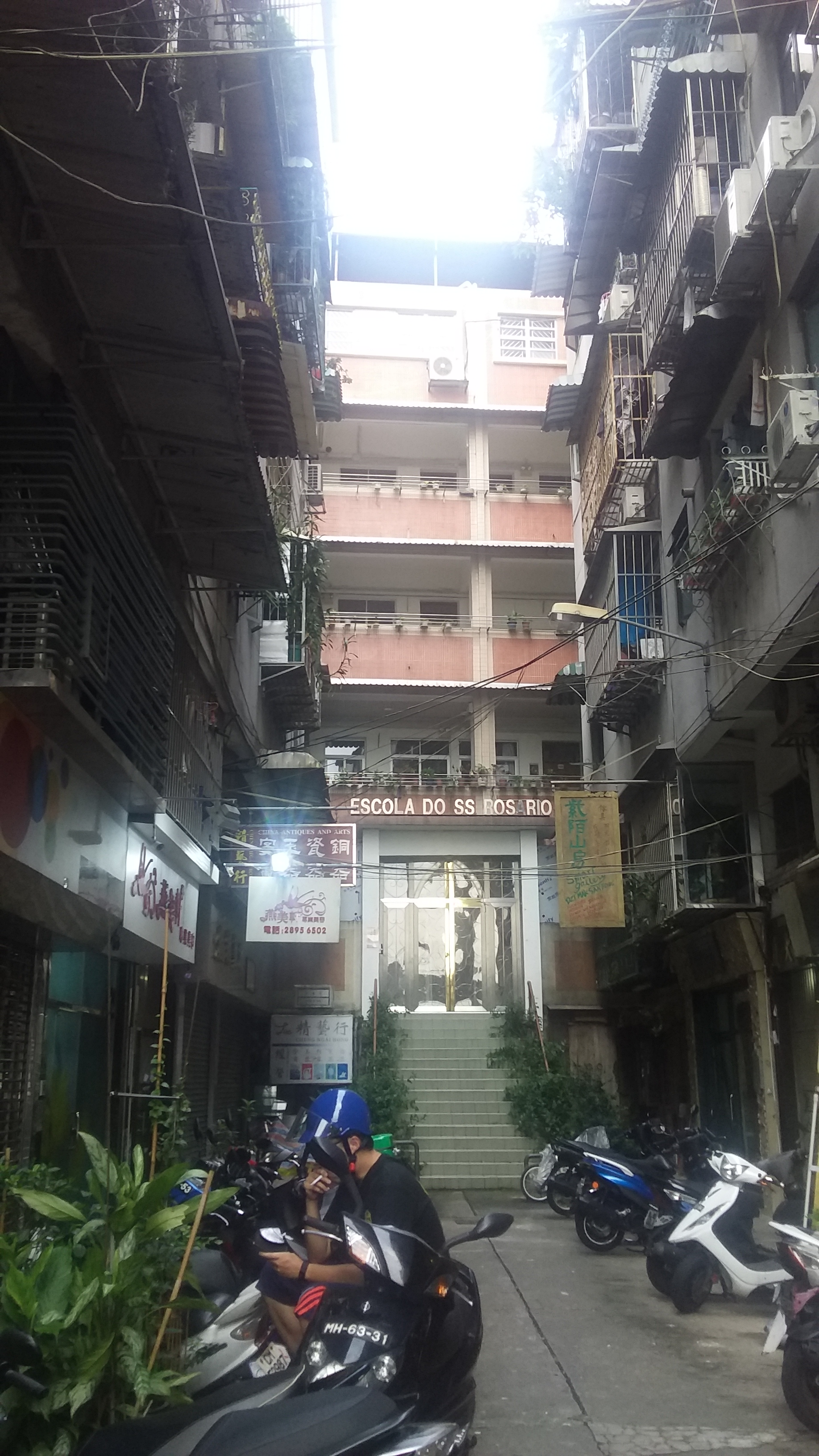
Escola do Santíssimo Rosário

The following schools are directly operated by the diocese:

Preschool through secondary school
- Colégio Diocesano de São José - Sé (not in Macau's tuition-free school network)
- Colégio Diocesano de São José 5 - Nossa Senhora de Fátima (not in Macau's tuition-free school network)
- Escola de São Paulo - Nossa Senhora de Fátima
Preschool through junior high school
- Escola do Santíssimo Rosário - Santo António (Closed)
Preschool and primary school
- Escola Dom João Paulino - Taipa
- Escola Madalena de Canossa - Nossa Senhora de Fátima
- Escola de Santa Teresa do Menino Jesus - Nossa Senhora de Fátima

There are other Catholic schools in Macau which are operated by Catholic orders.

== See also ==
- List of bishops of Macau
- list of Macao-related topics
- Catholic religious institutions, associations, and communities in Macau
- Procession of the Bom Jesus dos Passos in Macau
