= List of bishops of Macau =

List of Roman Catholic bishops of Macau

Portuguese Jesuit priest Melchior Miguel Carniero Leitão was appointed Titular Bishop of Nicaea on January 23, 1555. A year later (on January 26, 1576), Pope Gregory XIII issued an edict for the establishment of the Roman Catholic Diocese of Macau, where Leitão served—he was appointed the first bishop of Macau, a position he occupied till 1581.

No bishop of the diocese had been appointed archbishop or cardinal until Eugénio de Trigueiros and José da Costa Nunes were appointed as archbishops, following a re-designation by the Pope.

== Symbol ==
All Catholic bishops are appointed by the Pope, and are considered to be messengers (successors of the Apostles) as defined in the catechism of the Catholic Church;.

== Responsibilities ==
The Bishop of Macau is appointed as the spokesman of the Pope. He is the leader of the Roman Catholic Church in Macau, which he administers on behalf of the Pope. He is also responsible for the pastoral and charitable work that is carried out within the Diocese.

Initially, the jurisdiction of the Bishop of Macau included China, Japan, Hong Kong, the Korean Peninsula and neighbouring areas. However, with development and the increasing need for pastoral work, the Vatican has since established more than 600 other Roman Catholic dioceses in the region. Presently, the diocese has jurisdiction over six parishes and three quasi-parishes in the Macau Peninsula, Taipa and Coloane.

== Bishops ==
	Portuguese name Chinese name	Date/Place of birth	Date of Appointment	Commencement of episcopal duties	Date of inauguration	Date of resignation	Died	Remarks
1	Melchior Miguel Carniero Leitão, SJ 賈耐勞, apostolic administrator	1519; Portugal	1556	1560–12–15	1576	1581	1583–08–19; Macau	
2	Diogo Correia Valente, SJ 華倫他, apostolic administrator	1568; Portugal	1630	1618	1630	1633-10-22	1633–10–22; Macau	
3	João de Casal, OSA 嘉素	1641; Portugal	1690–04–10	unknown	1692-06-20	1735-09-20	1735-09-20; Macau	
4	Eugénio Trigueiros, OSA 德維智羅斯	1684–01–09; Portugal	1724	1727-12-07	1735-09-20	1739-02-11	1741-04-19	
5	Hilário de Santa Rosa OSA, OFM 羅沙	1693–03–01; Portugal	1739-02-11	1741-03-05	1742	1752-08-18	1764-03-30; Portugal	
6	Barolomeu Manuel Mendes dos Reis 孟定士	1720-08-23; Portugal	1753-01-29	1753-07-25	1754	1772-06-14	1799-03-07; Portugal	
7	OSA Guimarães 祁羅沙	1727-07-21; Portugal	1772-07-13	1773-09-19	1774	1782	1799-02-17; Portugal	
8	Marcelina José da Silva 施利華	1749-01-16; Portugal	1789-07-15	1790-01-07	1791	1802-09-16	1830-06-11; Portugal	
9	Manuel de São Galdino, OFM 賈定諾	1769-04-18; Portugal	1802-02-12	1803-03-27	1803	1804-08-20	1831-07-15	
10	Francisco Chacim, OFM 查善	1767-09-15; Portugal	1804-03-26	1804–11	1805	1828-01-31	1828-01-31; Macau	
11	Nicolaus Rodrigues Pereira de Borja, CM 栢朗古	1777; Portugal	1841-11-25	Unknown	1841	1845-03-28	1845-03-28; Macau	
12	Jerónimo José da Mata, CM 馬他	1804-12-18; Portugal	1843-11-19	1846-12-21	1845-03-28	1862-09-25	1865-05-05; Portugal	
13	Manuel Bernardo de Sousa Enes 蘇沙	1814-11-05; Portugal	1873-06-25	1874-12-17	1877	1883-08-09	1887-09-07; Portugal	
14	António Joaquim de Medeiros 明德祿	1846-10-15; Portugal	1884-08-29	Unknown	1884	1897-01-07	1897-01-07; Timor	
15	José Manuel de Carvalho 嘉惠勞	1844-09-16; Portugal	1897-02-04	1897-08-29	1897	1902-06-09	1904-04-24; Portugal	
16	João Paulino de Azevedo e Castro 鮑理諾	1852-02-04; Portugal	1902-06-09	1902-12-27	1902	1918-02-17	1918-02-17; Macau	
17	José da Costa Nunes 高若瑟	1880-03-15; Portugal	1920-11-20	1921-11-20	1920	1940-12-11	1976-11-29; Italy	
18	João de Deus Ramalho, SJ 羅若望	1890-01-08; Portugal	1942-09-24	1942-11-06	1942	1953	1958-02-26; Portugal	
19	Policarpo da Costa Vaz 高德華	1908-02-22; Portugal	1954-01-29	1950-06-29	1954	1960-11-21	1984-01-04; Portugal	
20	Paulo José Tavares 戴維理	1920-01-25; Portugal	1961-08-19	1961-09-21	1961	1973-06-12	1973-06-12; Portugal	
21	Arquimínio Rodrigues da Costa 高秉常	1924-07-08; Portugal	1976-01-20	1976-03-25	1976	1988-10-06	2016-09-12; Portugal	
22	Domingos Lam Ka-tseung 林家駿	1928-04-09; Hong Kong	1987-05-26	1987-09-08	1988-10-06	2003-06-30	2009-07-27; Macau	
23	José Lai Hung-seng 黎鴻昇	1946-02-14; Macau	2001-03-20	2001-06-02	2003-06-30	2016-01-16	—	
24	Stephen Lee Bun-sang 李斌生	1956-11-10 Hong Kong	2016-01-16	—	2016-01-23	Incumbent	—	

== Remarks ==
1. appointed as auxiliary bishop
2. appointed as Assisting Bishop
3. possessed, as taking the responsibility of the position
4. date of assumption of office
5. due to resignation
6. due to his decease
7. date of acting or assuming office
8. resignation accepted by Pope due to retirement
9. transferred to Portugal
10. appointed as Acting Bishop in 1623
11. as Bishop of Japan
12. inaugurated in 1738
13. appointed Archbishop of Diocese of Goa
14. transferred to Brazil and left Macau in 1765
15. arrived Macau in 1791
16. appointed Assistant Archbishop of Goa
17. transferred to Azores
18. appointed Archbishop of the Diocese of Goa and Dammam
19. baptized as Auxiliary Bishop of Diocese of Porto
20. Acting Bishop in 1963 and 1965, he was elected as Acting Bishop on June 14, 1975
21. Emeritus Bishop of Macau
