= St. Joseph's Seminary and Church =

Church building in Macau, China

Coordinates: 22°11′31″N 113°32′15″E

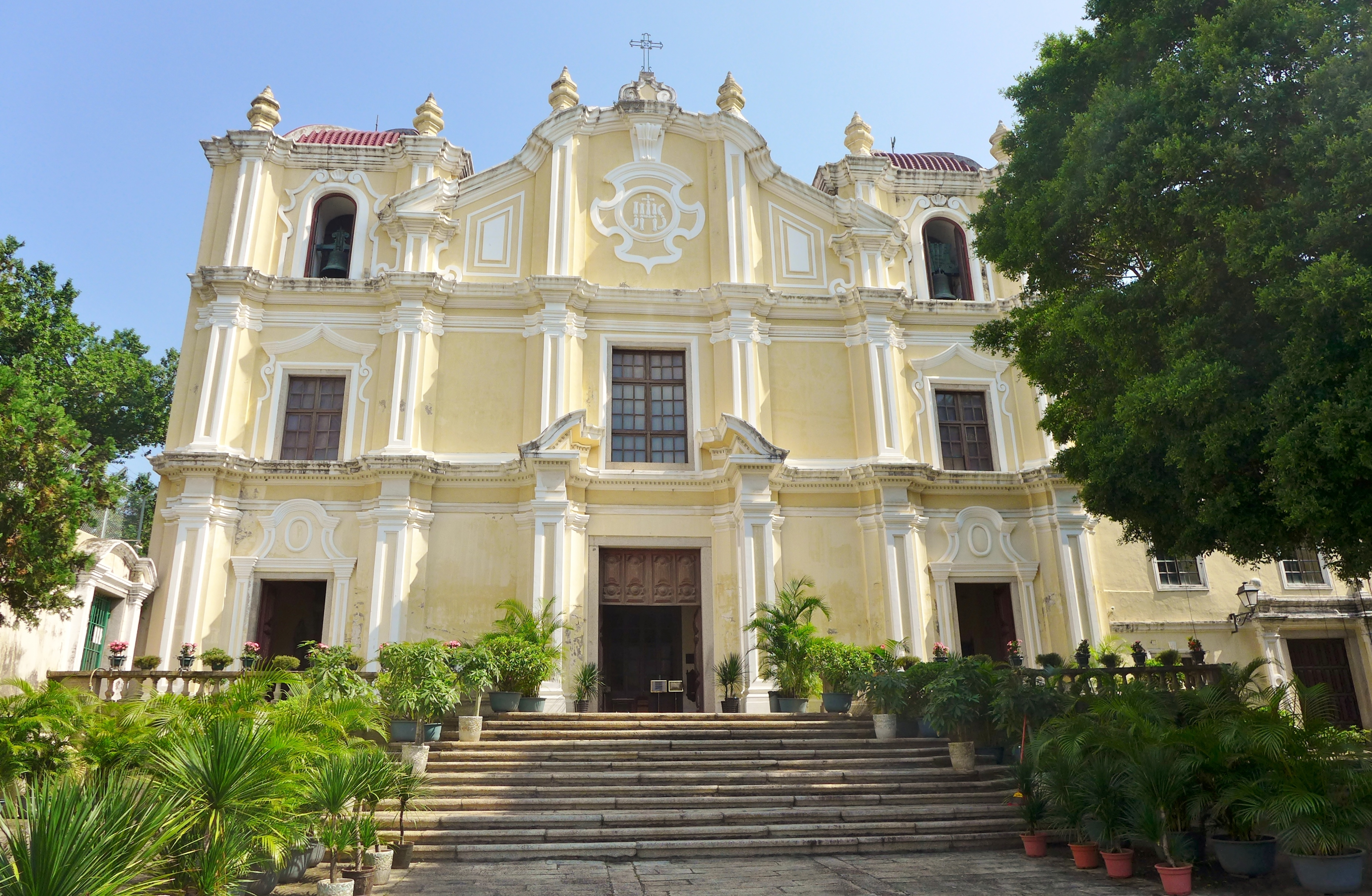
- The Church in 2023

Chinese name
- Traditional Chinese: 聖若瑟修院及聖堂
- Simplified Chinese: 圣若瑟修院及圣堂
Transcriptions
Standard Mandarin
- Hanyu Pinyin: Shèng Ruòsè Xiūyuàn jí Shèngtáng
Yue: Cantonese
- Jyutping: sing3 joek6 sat1 sau1 jyun2 kap6 sing3 tong4

Portuguese name
- Portuguese: Igreja e Seminário de São José

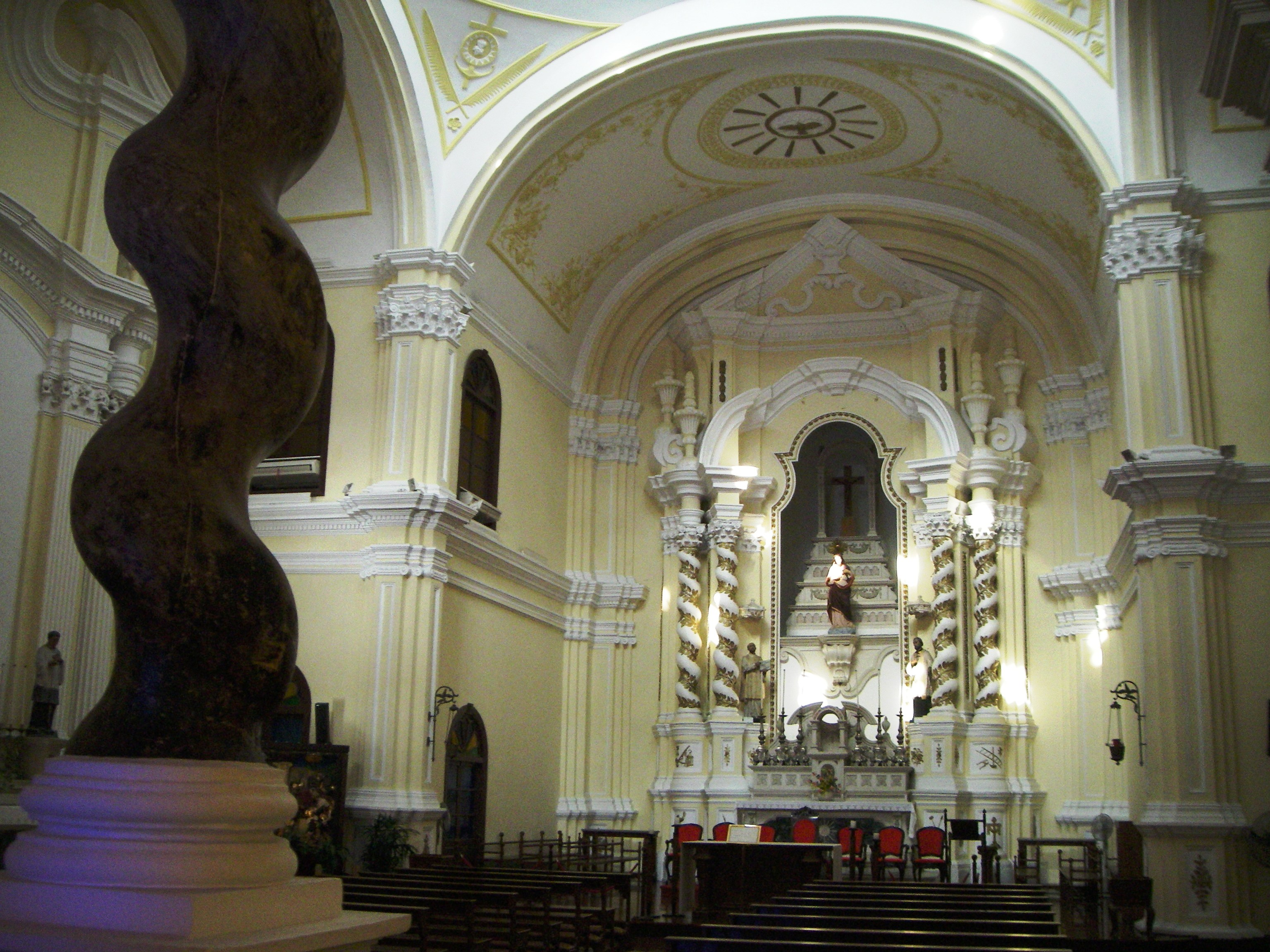
Interior of St Joseph's Church

The St. Joseph's Seminary and Church (Chinese: 聖若瑟修院及聖堂; Portuguese: Igreja e Seminário de São José) is a seminary and church located in São Lourenço, Macau, a Special Administrative Region of China.

== History ==
The seminary was established in 1728 in Portuguese Macau. Until 1758, it was sited at a hilltop area south of St. Paul's College, not at its current location.

Beginning in 1759, Portugal began suppressing the Jesuits under the direction of the kingdom's chief minister, Sebastião José de Carvalho e Melo, and in 1762 the Jesuits were expelled from Macau. the seminary closed as after the Jesuit's expulsion. The seminary re-opened in 1784 and was managed by the Lazarists (Congregation of the Mission).In 2005, the church became one of the designated sites of the Historic Centre of Macau enlisted on the UNESCO World Heritage List. In 2026, St Joseph's celebrated its 450th anniversary, with it being depicted on celebratory stamps issued by Macau Post.

A piece of Saint Francis Xavier’s right humerus can be viewed at the church of the seminary. As part of the Catholic posthumous practice of removing pieces of his body as relics, this portion of the right humerus was taken to Macau sometime before 1619.

== See also ==
- Religion in Macau
- List of Jesuit sites
