= St. Mary's Jacobite Soonoro Cathedral, Angamaly =

Church in Kerala, India

St. Mary's Jacobite Syrian Soonoro Cathedral, Angamaly
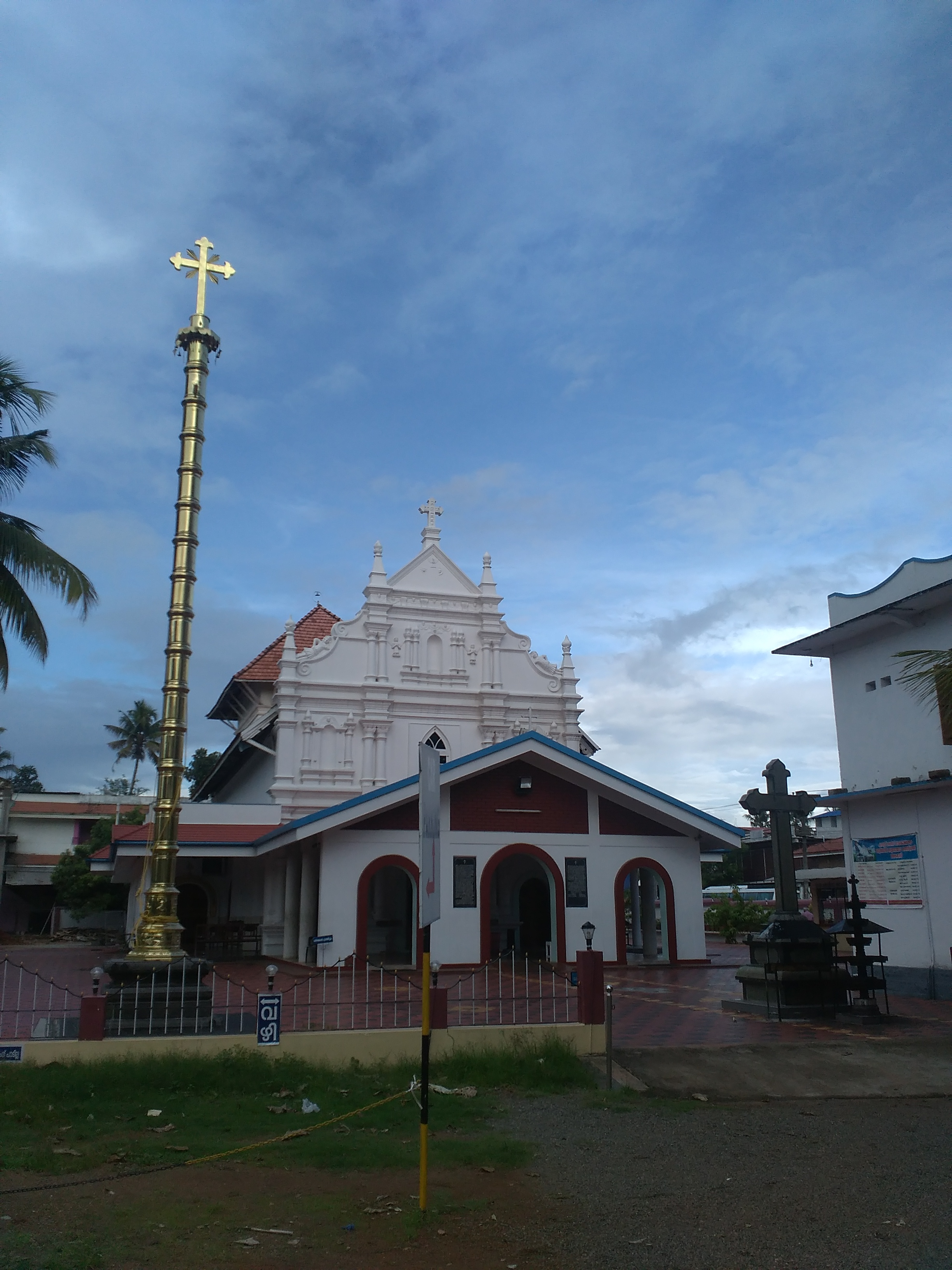
- The cathedral in 2016.

Religion
- Affiliation: Jacobite Syrian Orthodox Church
- District: Ernakulam
- Province: Kerala
- Festival: Memorial Feast of Ambattu Giwargis Mor Kurillos
- Ecclesiastical or organisational status: Cathedral
- Year consecrated: 1564

Location
- Location: Angamaly, Ernakulam, India
- Interactive map of St. Mary's Jacobite Syrian Soonoro Cathedral, Angamaly
- Coordinates: 10.1906°N 76.3828°E

Architecture
- Type: Church
- Style: Kerala architecture
- Founder: Archdeacon Giwargis of Christ
- Direction of façade: West

St. Mary's Jacobite Syrian Soonoro Cathedral, or Angamaly Cheriyapally, is an ancient Jacobite Syrian church located in Angamaly. Founded in 1564 by Archdeacon Giwargis of Christ, it is one of the most prominent and ancient Syriac Orthodox churches in Kerala. In the seventeenth century it was the residence of Archdeacon Thomas Parambil, who eventually got consecrated as bishop Mar Thoma I following the Coonan Cross Oath in 1653. It was initially the seat of the Archdeacon and later the Marthoma methrans, the local heads of the Malankara Church and hence held an important position in the church for several centuries.

== History ==
=== Christianity in Angamaly ===
Tradition says that Apostle St. Thomas arrived India in AD 52 and sowed the seeds of the Gospel and about 400 Syrian families immigrated in AD 345 under the leadership of the merchant Knayi Thoma to a town named Mahathevar patnam, near Muziris, the famous port of Kodungalloor. This was the first known centre of Christians in India. Jews who had engaged in trade with the coast of Malabar had inhabited the city much earlier and had rights to land and other privileges there. However Kodungalloor subsequently became less hospitable to Christians who took refuge in Angamaly. The local chieftain of "Mangattu", also referred to as "Mangattachan", graciously welcomed Christians into the area and granted them many privileges including the right to establish a church, a market and a town in 'Anke malee' (later Angamaly). The land for the Church in Angamaly was granted to the Syrian Christians next to his palace premises as a noble gesture. Thus the church was built with wood and thatched roofing in a location adjacent to the palace of the chieftain and in closer proximity to the palace. The number of Christians in Angamali swelled with further migrations, perhaps predominantly following the great flood in Periyar in 1341 that stilted the waters of the Muziris port. Later in 1523 the Muslim traders burnt down the Christian commercial establishments of Kodungallur and their church.

==== Angamaly's three churches ====
Following the fall of Christian Kodungallur, Angamaly came to be the foremost and most influential among the Saint Thomas Christian settlements, a fact that is apparent from the presence of three ancient churches in close vicinity. However, as noted by Melchior Carneiro, there was only one church back then in Angamali in 1550s and it was in the name of "Holy Virgin the Mother of Christ, the light and life". In 1564, the Cheriapally dedicated to St. Mary (of Assumption) was erected by Archdeacon George of Christ as the seat of the Archdeaconate and the older church or Valiyapally remained as the parish church for the local Christians. This incident is documented in King Keshava Rama Varma of Cochin's letter to Pope Gregory XIII, written on 2 January 1576 to express his concern over the Roman Catholic missionaries' misconduct to the then Metropolitan Abraham:

The Archdeacon George, likewise Our subject, has recently erected a church under the title of the Assumption of Our Lady in August, for which he requests me to obtain from Your Holiness certain Indulgences, which if granted, I shall regard as a favour done to me.

Antonio de Gouvea, in his book Jornada do Arcebispo de Goa Dom Frey Aleixo de Meneses (1606), the travelogue of Alexis de Menezes the padroado Archbishop of Goa who convened the Synod of Diamper, gives an account of the churches in Angamaly:

Angamalle (Angamali) has three big churches, the Cathedral had been dedicated to Hermusio (Hormusio) Abbot, a Nestorian heretic, and very important head of this heresy; the Archbishop changed its name to Saint Hormisda, martyr of Persia, which is the same name in the Malabar language, and persuaded the people that that was the Patron Saint of that church, that they were mistaken about the day and the legend of his life, and he ordered the burning of the book on the life of the said Hormusio, for having many errors and heresies, which he first showed to all the Cassanars, which they confessed to be so.

— Antonio de Gouvea, Jornada do Arcebispo de Goa Dom Frey Aleixo de Meneses (1606), Malekandathil 2003, p. 350

Following the Synod of Diamper and Coonan Cross Oath, the community underwent a schism into Syrian Catholic and Jacobite factions. The churches of Angamaly were eventually partitioned between the two groups. Anquetil Du Perron, who visited Malabar in the eighteenth century, gives the following list and description of churches in Angamaly in the country of the Velutha Thavali ruler:

1. Church of the Holy Virgin (valiyapalli or Great Church) co-owned by Syrian Catholics and Jacobites. It had a chapel dedicated to Saint George in which both Syrian Catholics and Jacobites used to celebrate their liturgies one after the other.
2. Another church dedicated to Saint Hormisdas the Martyr. It is used exclusively by the Syrian Catholics. It was the Cathedral church of the diocese before its see was moved to Cranganore.
3. Another church which is also dedicated to the Holy Virgin. It is known locally as the Cheriyapally (Minor Church). It is the headquarters of Archdeacon Thoma I and it is used exclusively by the Syrian Jacobites. It is the present day St. Mary's Jacobite Soonoro Cathedral, Angamaly.

He then mentions a fourth church in the country of the Velutha Thavali, which is at Akaparambu and dedicated to Saint Gervasis, co-owned by Syrian Catholics and Jacobites.

Anglican priest J. W. Doran in 1830 records that the combined membership of Jacobite Syrians in the churches of Angamaly and Akaparambu were about 1400 and that the Cheriyapalli had a property of 30,000 chakrams. He adds that the Jacobite Syrians had got the Roman Catholics 'evacuated' from the Akaparambu church by giving them 75,000 chakrams as a premium.

=== Ecclesiastical history ===
==== The Seat of the Archdeacons ====
Archdeacons of Pakalomattom family including Giwargis of Christ (George of Christ), Archdeacon John, Giwargis of the Cross (Archdeacon George of the Cross) and Parambil Thoma used the Angamaly Cheriyapally as their administrative headquarters. George of Christ was appointed as the Archdeacon in 1562 by Chaldean archbishop Joseph Sulaqa. George of Christ built this church following his election as the bishop of Palur in the diocesan assembly. This church is adorned by beautiful mural paintings, chandeliers and wooden carvings. In 1566, Chaldean Patriarch Abdisho IV Maron gave his accent to the election and appointed George of Christ as the bishop of Palur and coadjutor of the Archdiocese of Angamaly to ensure a successor to Metropolitan Abraham. However, the succession plan failed due to the death of the Archdeacon. Givargis of Christ and Parambil Thoma were entombed in this Church.

==== Synod of Diamper ====
The whole parish defied the decrees of the Synod of Diamper in 1599 and firmly stood with the Archdeacon in resisting the Portuguese Padroado. The Catholic historian Bernard Thoma Alencherry records that the Syrian Christians in Mangad, Kochi, Purakad, and Thekkumkur who were loyal to Archdeacon George of Cross were threatened by local kings and Petty chieftains to attend the Synod of Diamper in 1599, as commanded by the Portuguese. The Raja of Cochin decreed that all assets of Syrian churches which abstain from the Synod of Diamper on 20 June 1599 will be confiscated. The Angamaly Church defied the command and boycotted the Synod unanimously; All the eighteen priests of the church abstained from the Synod. The militant Portuguese bishop through threats and offers of military and monetary support to the local king and chieftains managed to create a schism among Saint Thomas Christians and created a substantial Catholic presence in Angamaly.

==== After Coonan Cross Oath ====
After the Coonan Cross Oath of 1653, a delegate of the Syriac Orthodox Patriarch of Antioch, Gregorios Abdal Jaleel an archbishop of Jerusalem, arrived in Malabar. In 1665 he regularized the consecration of Thoma I as the first Metropolitan Bishop of Malankara. At first during his reign Thoma I was assisted by Angamaly Vengoor Gevarghese Kathanar, Kadavil Chandy Kathanar, Parambil Chandy, and Anjimootil Itty Thoman Kathanar, who lead the Coonan Cross Oath in 1653.

After the Synod of Diamper and Coonan Cross Oath, which lead to the schism among the Saint Thomas Christians, the Angamaly Cheriyapally came under the exclusive control of the Jacobite faction, who were known by then as the Puthenkoor. 84 out of the 116 total churches, including the Angamaly Kilakkeppalli, the former cathedral located at the end of the city market, came under Syrian Catholic (Palayakoor) governance. The Valiyapalli, located next to the St Marys Cheriyapally Church, was shared between the two factions until their complete legal separation in the 18th century. Meanwhile, Thoma I had maintained his seat at Angamaly Cheriyapally. The 32 churches that remained with him, continued to be administered by him from Angamaly. He was buried in this church in 1670.

For many centuries this church and the Akaparambu Church (Mar Sabor and Mar Afroth) were a united parish and was administered by one council as is evident in the record of a general body meeting of 16-8-1069 (Malayalam Era).

==== Estrangelo Bible ====
In 1808 an ancient Bible written during the headship of Dionysius the Great at the Angamaly church was presented to the Anglican missionary Claudius Buchanan. This Bible is now preserved in the archives of the Cambridge University Library. This Syriac Bible might have been brought to India by Fathers from the Syriac Orthodox Patriarchate Antioch as its appendix includes intercessory prayers to Mary and Severios of Antioch.

== Gallery ==
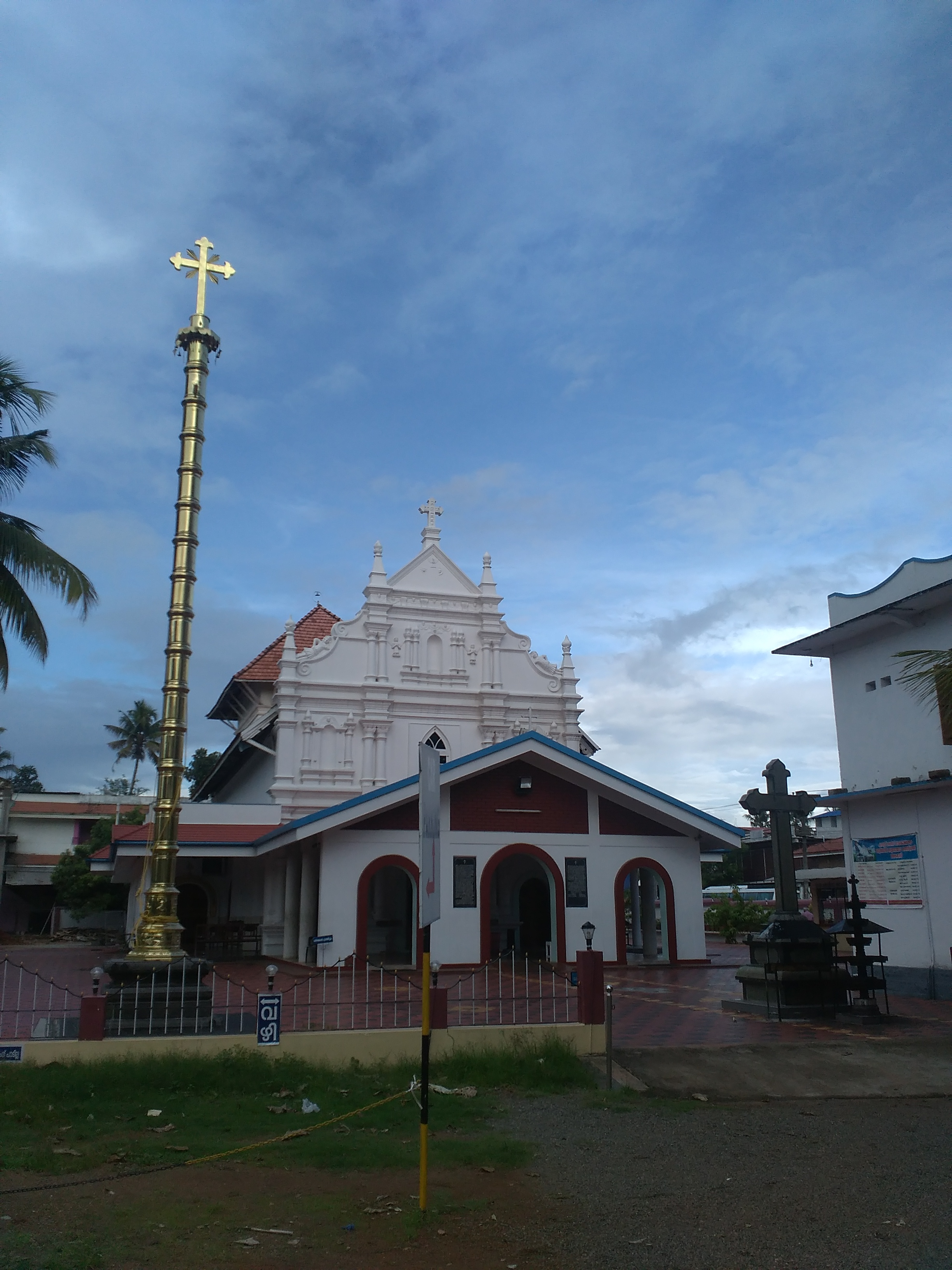
Angamaly Church

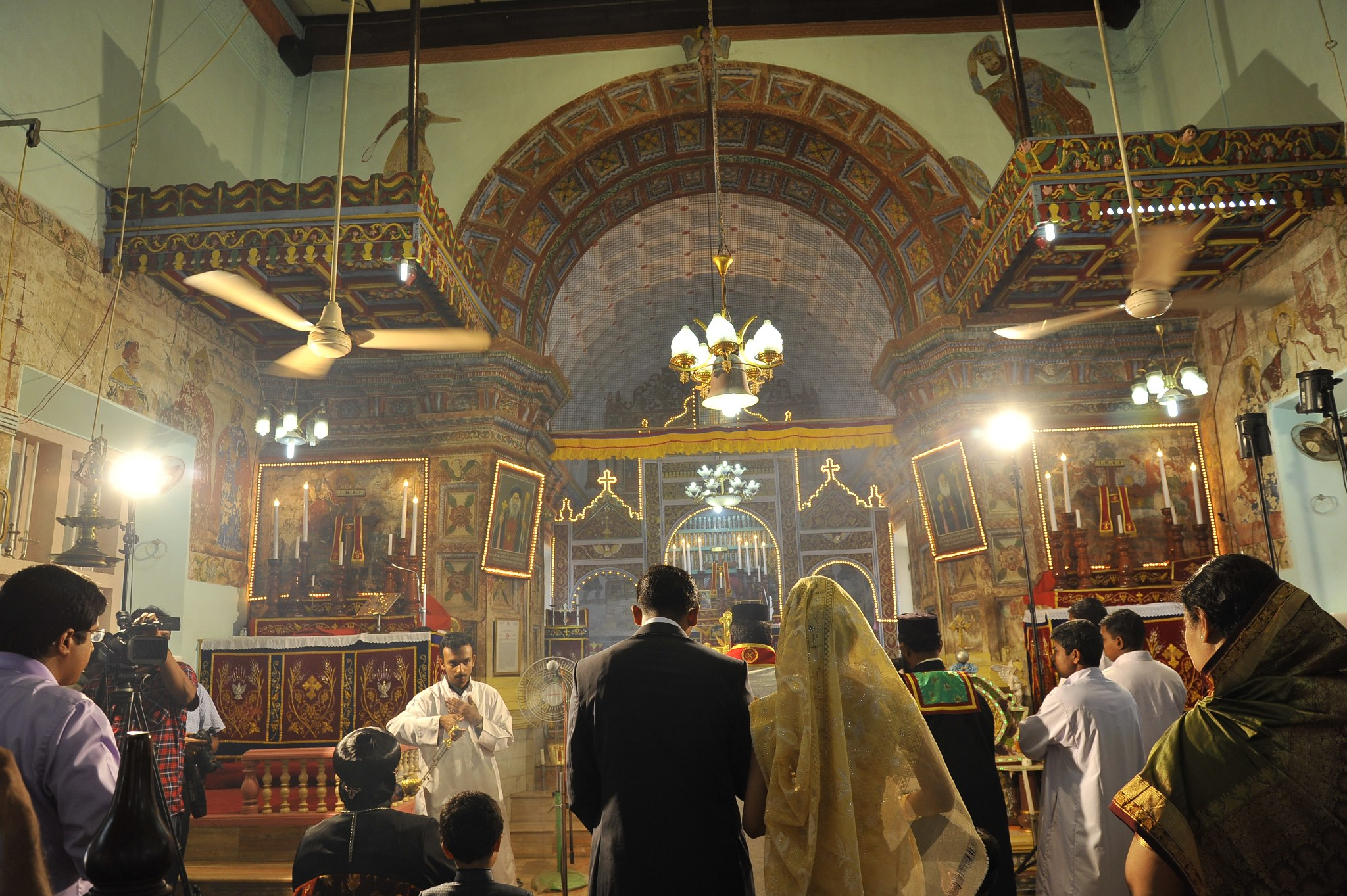
Altar room of Angamaly Syrian Church.

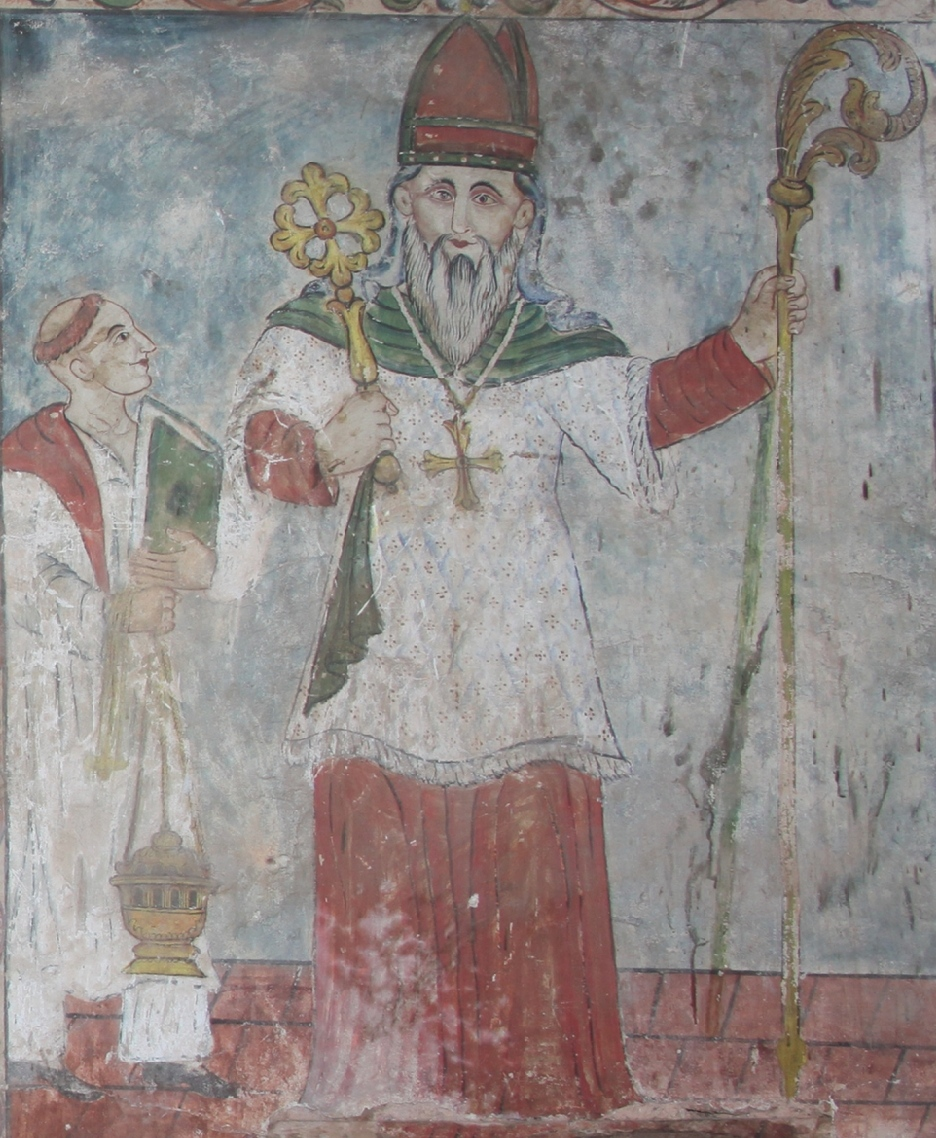
Mural Painting of Giwargis of Christ.

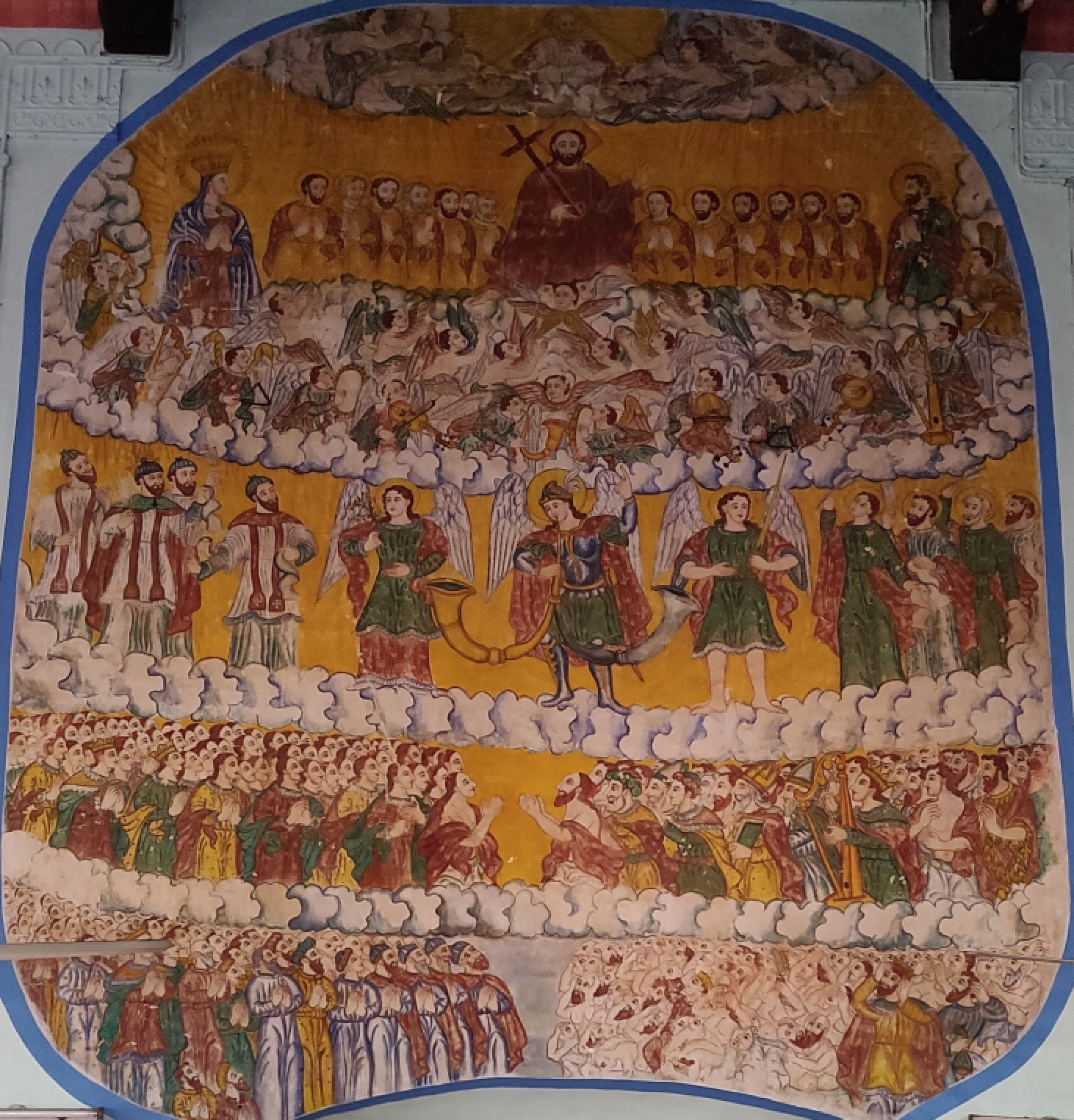
Mural Painting of Last Judgement above the northern entrance.

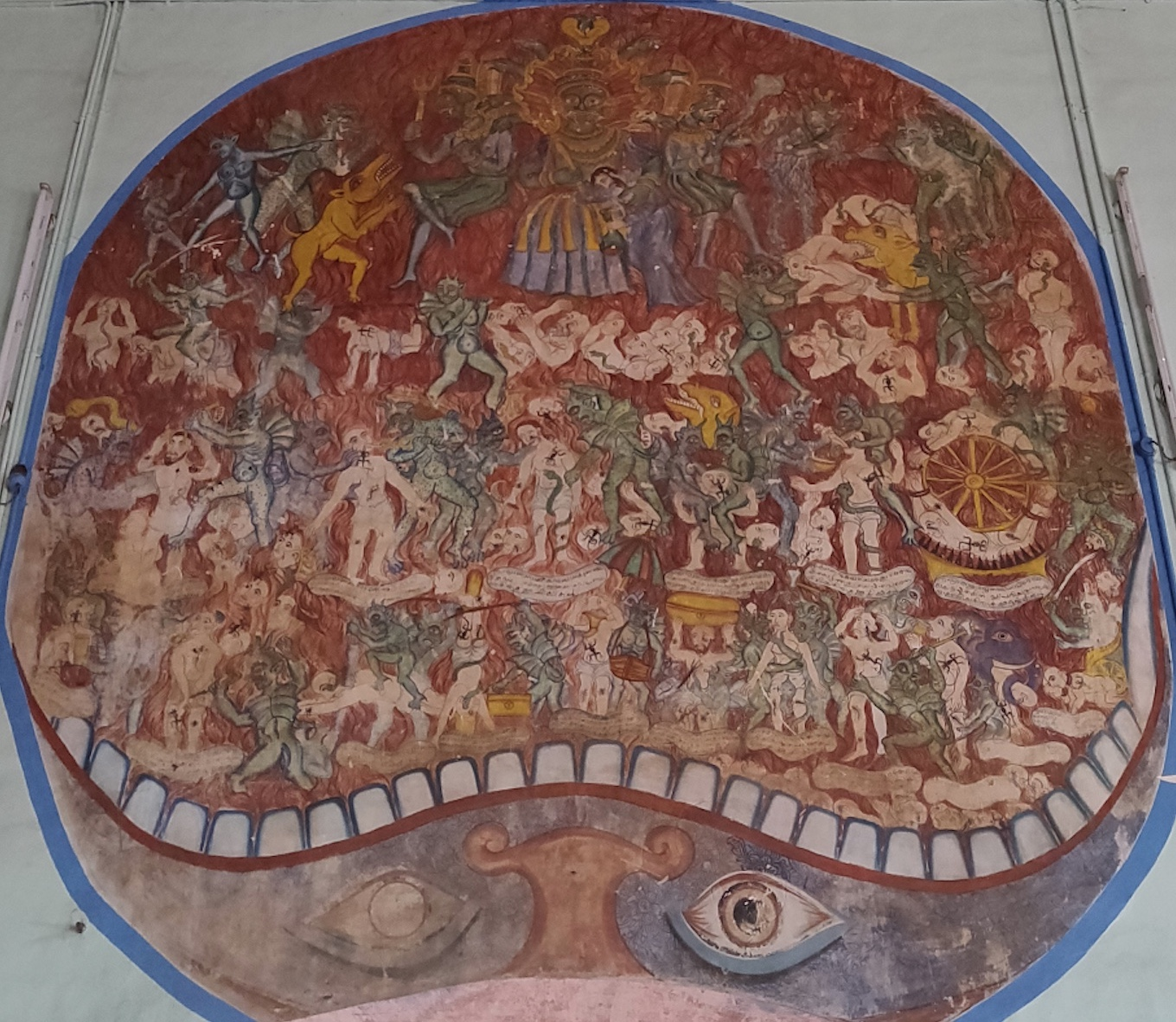
Mural depicting hell above the southern entrance.

== Sources ==
- Duperron, A. H. Anquetil (1771). Zend Avesta (in French). Vol. I. N.M. Tilliard. pp. clxxxv–clxxxvj.
- Pearson, Hugh (1819). Memoirs of the Life and Writings of the Rev. Claudius Buchanan. London: Oxford University Press. pp. 85–89. OCLC 1048815028.
- Antonio de Gouvea (2003). Malekandathil, Pius (ed.). Jornada of Dom Alexis de Menezes: A Portuguese Account of the Sixteenth Century Malabar.
- Malekandathil, Pius (2016). Angamali and the St. Thomas Christians: An Historical Overview.
