= Afonso Mendes =

Portuguese Jesuit theologian; Patriarch of Ethiopia from 1622 to 1634

Afonso Mendes S.J.
- Patriarch of Ethiopia
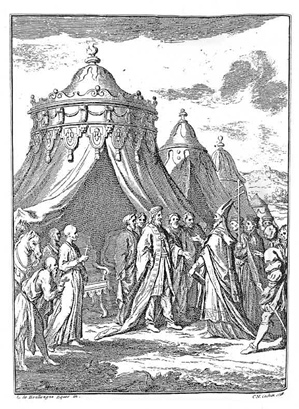
- Contemporary portrait of King Susenyos I of Ethiopia receiving the Latin Patriarch Afonso Mendes
- Church: Catholic Church
- In office: 19 December 1622 – 21 June 1659
- Predecessor: Melchior Carneiro
- Successor: Jacobus Wemmers

Orders
- Consecration: 12 March 1623 by Fernando Martins Mascarenhas

Personal details
- Born: 18 June 1579 Campo de Gamos, Kingdom of Portugal
- Died: 21 June 1659 (aged 80) Goa, State of India, Kingdom of Portugal

Father Afonso Mendes (18 June 1579 – 21 June 1659) was a Portuguese Jesuit theologian, and Patriarch of Ethiopia from 1622 to 1634. While E. A. Wallis Budge has expressed the commonly accepted opinion of this man, as being "rigid, uncompromising, narrow-minded, and intolerant", there are some who disagree with it. The writings of Mendes include Expeditionis Aethiopicae, which describes the customs and conditions of Ethiopia.

== Education ==
Mendes was born in Santo Aleixo. He entered the Society of Jesus, where he was ordained priest, he received his doctorate in theology at the University of Coimbra, where he subsequently taught at the College of Arts.

== Journey to Ethiopia ==
In response to the favor Emperor Susenyos I showed towards Catholicism, Mendes was appointed Patriarch of Ethiopia by Pope Urban VIII, and left for Ethiopia in March 1623. (The first Catholic missionaries had arrived in Ethiopia in 1557).

The journey to Ethiopia was long and difficult. Mendes' party reached Portuguese Mozambique that September, where they were delayed by winter weather, and only reached Goa on 28 May 1624. After making further preparations in Goa, the Patriarch sailed for Ethiopia by way of Diu (where he was joined by Jerónimo Lobo), and arrived at Beilul on 2 May 1625. The primary port of entrance to Ethiopia, Massawa, was at the time controlled by the Ottoman Empire, which was hostile to both Ethiopian and European interests, so they landed at Beilul, an open roadstead on the Red Sea, controlled by the king of the Afars, who was a vassal to the Emperor of Ethiopia. The party crossed the desert into the Ethiopian Highlands, and reached Fremona, the base of Catholic missionary efforts, on 21 June 1625, over two years after Mendes had left Lisbon.

== Career in Ethiopia ==
At a public ceremony on 11 February 1626, the Emperor Susenyos and Patriarch Mendes publicly acknowledged the primacy of the Roman See and made Catholicism the state religion.

Mendes condemned a number of local practices, which included Saturday Sabbath and frequent fasts. He also told women that their children were in hell because they had been baptized in the Ethiopian Orthodox Church.Many of the royal women resisted conversion and worked to destabilize the Jesuit's mission. He also ordained many Catholic priests and had Latin texts, including the mass, translated into the local language.

For a time, conversions were made. Richard Pankhurst reports 100,000 inhabitants of Dembiya and Wegera are said to have converted to Catholicism. But many were compelled to convert through threats, imprisonment, and battle.

However, strife and rebellions over the enforced changes began within days of the public ceremony, and soon the Emperor's son, Fasilides sided with the indigenous Ethiopian Orthodox Church.

After many years of civil war, and devastated by what his own soldiers had done to the local people in a battle on 7 June 1632, Emperor Susenyos rescinded his edict on 14 June 1632, and issued a formal declaration that those who would follow the Catholic faith were allowed to do so, but no one would be forced to do so any further. Patriarch Mendes confirmed that this was, indeed, the actual will of the Emperor, his protector.

Upon succeeding his father, Fasilides first confined the Catholic hierarchy to Fremona, then in 1634 exiled Mendes (who had served for nine years in Ethiopia) and most of the Catholic missionaries from Ethiopia.

On March 29, 1633, Mendes began his journey out of Ethiopia, a journey fraught with difficulties. When they reached the Ottoman Naib at Massawa, Ethiopia, the Naib sent them to his superior at Suakin, where the Pasha forced the party to pay a ransom before they could proceed to India. Despite settling for a ransom of 4300 patacas (which Mendes borrowed from local Banyan merchants), at the last moment the Pasha insisted on keeping Patriarch Mendes, two priests, three clerics, and two of his servants. These were kept prisoner until Mendes managed to raise another 4000 pieces of eight as their ransom, and the Pasha put them on a ship bound for Diu on 24 April 1635.

== Career in Goa ==
They reached Diu a month later, and Mendes immediately continued on to Goa, where he unsuccessfully sought military support for his restoration.

He appears to have spent the rest of his life in Goa, where he wrote his book on Ethiopian history and geography and the Jesuit mission in Ethiopia, Expeditionis Aethiopicae. His letters and annual reports in Latin appear in other volumes of the series Rerum Aethiopicarum Scriptores Occidentales and many have been translated into English.

== Reputation ==
Mendes is frequently blamed for the failure of the Jesuit mission in Ethiopia. Indeed, the only other country where the Jesuit mission failed was Japan.

However, some have argued that the Jesuit organization blamed Mendes, who was only carrying out their orders, to avoid the failure being laid at their feet.

"Scholars have tended to see Pedro Páez, who converted Susənyos, as a tolerant intellectual who built relations, and to see Mendes as an intolerant hard-liner who destroyed relations by insisting on culturally unacceptable religious practices. But some scholars have argued otherwise. In the 1930s, the Portuguese scholar Paulo Durão pointed out that in the environment of the seventeenth century, the Jesuits were less worried about accusations of intolerance than in accusations about their condescending attitudes. Decades later, Merid Wolde Aregay suggested that Mendes feared appearing lax and weak in the eyes of his superiors in Rome and behaved accordingly. ... [His own letters and reports] suggest that Mendes was not, in fact, a hard-liner by personality but rather was implementing the new rules handed down by the new missionary oversight institution of the Sacra Congregatio de Propaganda Fide."

Mendes himself blamed the royal Ethiopian women. For instance, he described the emperor's daughter Wängelawit as the “principal figura nesta tragédia” (principal figure in this tragedy [of the Jesuits' failure]).

== See also ==
- Pedro Páez
- Jerónimo Lobo
- Susenyos I
