= Leonardo Fernandes de Sá =

Roman Catholic prelate (1578–1597)

His Excellency, The Most Reverend Leonardo Fernandes de Sá O. Cist.
- Bishop of Macau
- Church: Catholic Church
- Diocese: Diocese of Macau
- In office: 1578–1597
- Predecessor: Melchior Carneiro (administrator)
- Successor: João Pinto da Piedade

Personal details
- Born: Cartaxo, Portugal
- Died: 15 September 1597
- Denomination: Roman Catholic

Leonardo Fernandes de Sá, O. Cist. was a Roman Catholic prelate who served as Bishop of Macau (1578–1597).

== Biography ==
Leonardo Fernandes de Sá was born in Cartaxo, Portugal. He was ordained in the Order of Cistercians. On 27 Oct 1578 he was appointed during the papacy of Pope Gregory XIII as Bishop of Macau. He arrived at Macau in 1581 replacing Melchior Carneiro, the Patriarch of Ethiopia, who was serving as administrator. He served as Bishop of Macau until his death on 15 Sep 1597. The diocese was governed by Father Manuel de Aguiar from 1597–1599 and Miguel dos Santos from 1599–1607 until the arrival of João Pinto da Piedade.

Catholic Church titles
| Preceded by Melchior Carneiro; Administrator | Bishop of Macau; 1578–1597 | Succeeded by João Pinto da Piedade |
