= Patriarch of Ethiopia =

Patriarch of Ethiopia may refer to:

- the Catholic former Latin Patriarch of Ethiopia (1555-1663)
- the Orthodox Patriarch-Catholicos of Axum
