= João da Rocha =

Portuguese Catholic bishop (1587–1639)

Most Reverend João da Rocha S.J.
- Titular Archbishop of Hierapolis in Phrygia
- Church: Catholic Church
- In office: 6 March 1623 – 20 July 1639
- Predecessor: Andrés de Oviedo
- Successor: Meletius Smotrytsky
- Other post: Coadjutor Patriarch of Ethiopia (1623-1639)

Orders
- Ordination: 1603
- Consecration: 1625 by Sebastião de São Pedro

Personal details
- Born: 1587 Lisbon, Kingdom of Portugal
- Died: 20 July 1639 (aged 51–52) Goa, State of India, Portuguese Empire

João da Rocha, S.J. (1587–1639) was a Roman Catholic prelate who was named as Titular Archbishop of Hierapolis in Phrygia (1623–1639).

== Biography ==
João da Rocha was born in Lisbon in 1587 and ordained a priest in 1603 in the Society of Jesus. On 6 Mar 1623, he was appointed during the papacy of Pope Gregory XV as Titular Archbishop of Hierapolis in Phrygia and Coadjutor Patriarch of Ethiopia. In 1625, he was consecrated bishop by Sebastião de São Pedro, Archbishop of Goa. He never succeeded as Patriarch of Ethiopia and died as Titular Archbishop of Hierapolis in Phrygia on 20 Jul 1639 in Goa.

While bishop, he was the principal co-consecrator of Francisco Garcia Mendes, Titular Bishop of Ascalon and Coadjutor Archbishop of Cranganore (1637).

== External links and additional sources ==
- Cheney, David M. "Archdiocese of Goa e Damão". Catholic-Hierarchy.org. (for Chronology of Bishops) ^{[self-published]}
- Chow, Gabriel. "Metropolitan Archdiocese of Goa and Daman (India)". GCatholic.org. (for Chronology of Bishops) ^{[self-published]}

Catholic Church titles
Preceded by Andrés de Oviedo	Titular Archbishop of Hierapolis in Phrygia; 1623–1639	Succeeded by Meletiy Smotrytskyi
Preceded by Sebastião de São Pedro	Administrator of Goa; 1630–1631	Succeeded by Manuel Teles de Brito
