= Jerónimo Lobo =

Portuguese Jesuit missionary in Ethiopia (1595–1678)

- Born: 1595; Lisbon, Kingdom of Portugal
- Died: 29 January 1678 (aged 82–83); Lisbon, Kingdom of Portugal
- Occupations: Jesuit missionary, writer
- Parent(s): Francisco Lobo da Gama; Maria Brandão de Vasconcelos

Jerónimo Lobo (1595 – 29 January 1678) was a Portuguese Jesuit missionary. He took part in the unsuccessful efforts to convert Ethiopia from the native Ethiopian church to Roman Catholicism until the expulsion of the Jesuits in 1643. Afterwards he wrote an account of his time in Ethiopia, Itinerário, which is an important source for the history and culture of that country.

== Life ==
He was born in Lisbon the third of at least five sons and six daughters to Francisco Lobo da Gama, the Governor of Portuguese Cape Verde, and Maria Brandão de Vasconcelos. He entered the Order of Jesus at the age of 14. In 1621 he was ordained a priest and was ordered as a missionary to India, and after surviving an attack on the fleet carrying him by English and Dutch ships off Portuguese Mozambique a year later, he arrived at Goa in December 1622.

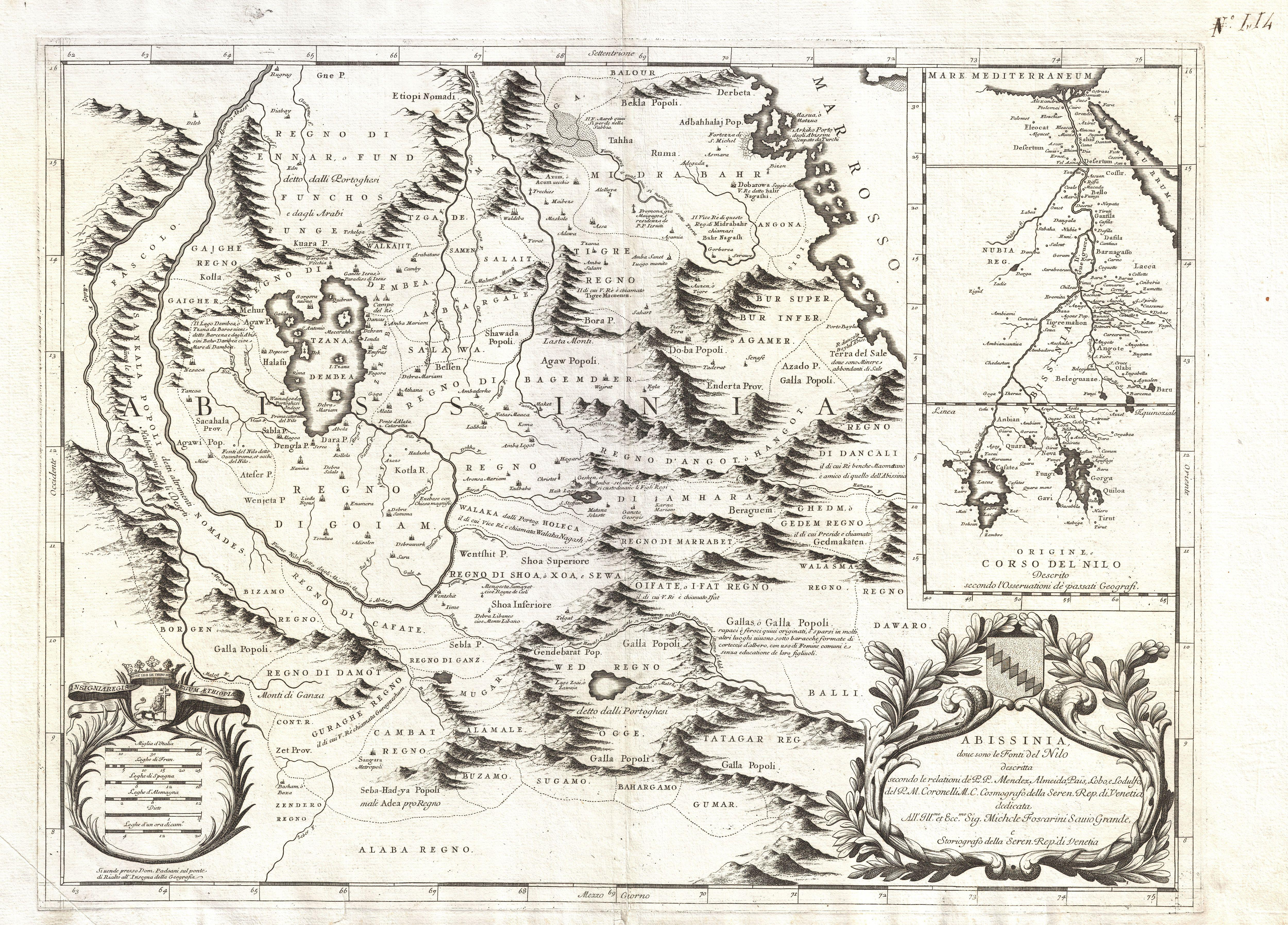
"Abissinia, doue sono le Fonti del Nilo descritta secondo le relationi de P.P. Mendez, Almeida, Pais, Lobo, e Lodulfo del P. M. Coronelli M.C. Cosmografo della Seren. Rep. di Ventia"--Vincenzo Coronelli (1690)

With the intention of proceeding to Ethiopia, whose Nəgusä nägäst Susenyos I had been converted to Roman Catholicism by Pedro Páez, he left India in 1624. He struggled to overcome the difficulty that Ethiopia controlled none of the northern coastline, first disembarking at Pate and attempted to reach his destination along the Jubba River through country controlled by the Oromo, but was forced to return. Then in 1625 he set out again, accompanied by Afonso Mendes, the Catholic Patriarch of Ethiopia, and eight missionaries, landing at Beilul, a port on the coast of the Red Sea controlled by the king of Dankali, vassal to the Emperor of Ethiopia. After a month spent crossing the desert into the Ethiopian Highlands, the party reached Fremona, where Lobo assumed the responsibilities of superintendent of the missions in Tigray.

His other activities included recovering the remains of Cristóvão da Gama, who had been captured and executed by Ahmad ibn Ibrihim al-Ghazi in 1542, at the request of his great nephew Francisco da Gama, Conde da Vidigueira and Governor-general of India. He also served as a missionary to the southwest of Lake Tana, where he visited the source of the Blue Nile in 1629.

The abdication of Emperor Susenyos (1632) deprived the Catholics of their protector; his successor, Fasilides, first confined them once again at Fremona, then in 1634 Lobo and his companions were exiled from Ethiopia, who were exposed to robbery, assaults and other indignities by the local population before reaching the Ottoman Naib at Massawa. He sent them to his superior at Suakin, where the Pasha forced the party to pay a ransom before they could proceed to India. Despite settling for a ransom of 4300 patacas (which he borrowed from local Banyan merchants), at the last moment the Pasha insisted on keeping Patriarch Mendes and three other senior priests for further money.

Once Lobo reached Diu, he left for Goa by canoe, arriving at the provincial capital on 8 December 1634. There he attempted to convince viceroy Miguel de Noronha, conde de Linhares to send an armament to the Red Sea to capture Suakin and Massawa, free the patriarch by force, and restore Catholicism to Ethiopia. Although the Viceroy was willing to make a punitive expedition against Suakin to free the Patriarch, he did not want to overextend Portuguese forces and garrison either port. Unwilling to settle for just freeing the patriarch, Lobo embarked for Portugal, and after he had been shipwrecked on the coast of Natal, then captured by pirates, he arrived at Lisbon. Neither at this city, however, nor at Madrid and Rome, was any approval given to Lobo's plan.

He accordingly returned to India in 1640, and was elected rector, and afterwards provincial, of the Jesuits at Goa. After some years he returned to his native city, where he died.

== Writings ==
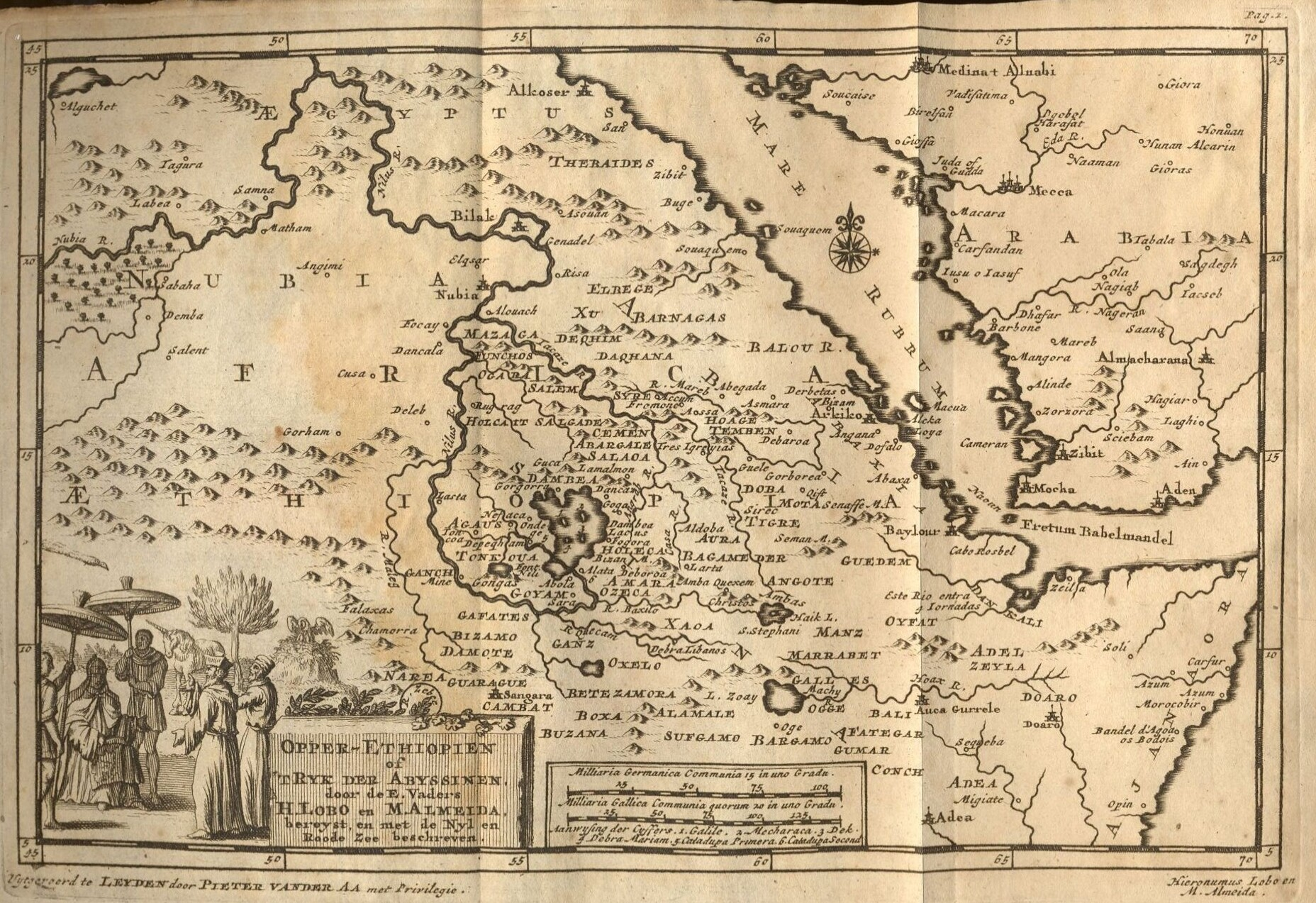
Map from the Dutch edition of Historia de Etiopía a Alta ou Abassia, by Lobo & Manuel de Almeida

A number of Lobo's writings have survived. He entered into a correspondence with Henry Oldenburg of the Royal Society concerning the source of the Nile, which likely led to the publication in London of a little book entitled A Short Relation of the River Nile, of its source and current; of its overflowing the campagnia of Ægypt, until it runs into the Mediterranean and of other curiosities: written by an eye-witnesse, who lived many years in the chief kingdoms of the Abyssine Empire. Translated by Sir Peter Wyche.

Gabriel Pereira reported in 1903 that he had found three short works in manuscript by Lobo in the library of the Duke of Palmela, and in 1966 Fr. Manuel Gonçalves da Costa discovered in the Ajuda library at Lisbon another short work of Lobo, Breve Notícia e Relação de Algumas Cousas Certas não vulgares, e dignas de se saberem, escritas e [sic] instância de Curiosos, which repeated the topics of A Short Relation.

His best known work is his memoirs of the years 1622-1640, which cover his voyage to India, his experiences in Ethiopia, and his journey back to Portugal; his Itinerário, however, was not published during his lifetime. Baltasar Teles made large use of Lobo's writing in his História geral da Ethiópia a Alta (Coimbra, 1660), often erroneously attributed to Lobo, but incorporated much from Manuel de Almeida's manuscript work. Lobo's own narrative was translated from a copy owned by the Count of Ericeira by the Abbé Joachim le Grand into French in 1728, under the title of Voyage historique d'Abissinie. An English abridgement of Le Grand's edition by Dr. Samuel Johnson was published in 1735 (reprinted 1789).

Fr. da Costa discovered another manuscript of Lobo's work in the Biblioteca Pública at Braga in 1947. This was not the same manuscript that le Grand translated; both were copies, with variations, of the original autograph left at the Casa de São Roque at the time of Lobo's death. The whole of this manuscript was translated by Donald M. Lockhart, and published with an introduction and notes by C.F. Beckingham by the Hakluyt Society in 1984.
