= Sebastián Foronda =

Spanish bishop (1490–1543)

Most Reverend Sebastián Foronda
- Bishop of Calydon
- Church: Catholic Church
- Diocese: Diocese of Cebu
- In office: 1722–1728
- Predecessor: Martín de Sarricolea y Olea
- Successor: Juan de Las Peñas

Orders
- Consecration: by João de Casal

Personal details
- Born: 1665
- Died: 20 May 1728 (age 63)

Sebastián Foronda OSA (1490–1543) was an auxiliary bishop who served as Administrator of Cebu (1722–1728).

== Biography ==
Sebastián Foronda was born in 1665 in Badajoz, Spain and ordained a priest in the Order of Saint Augustine. On 2 Mar 1722, Pope Innocent XIII named him as Titular Bishop of Calydon and consecrated bishop in Macau by João de Casal, Bishop of Macau. He was then assigned to the Archdiocese of Cebu to serve as an administrator. He died on 20 May 1728.

While bishop, he was the principal consecrator of Felipe Molina y Figueroa, Bishop of Nueva Caceres.

== External links and additional sources ==
- Cheney, David M. "Calydon (Titular See)". Catholic-Hierarchy.org. (for Chronology of Bishops) ^{[self-published]}
- Chow, Gabriel. "Metropolitan Archdiocese of Cebu". GCatholic.org. (for Chronology of Bishops) ^{[self-published]}
- Cheney, David M. "Archdiocese of Cebu". Catholic-Hierarchy.org. (for Chronology of Bishops) ^{[self-published]}

Religious titles
Preceded by Pedro Sanz de la Vega y Landaverde	Administrator of Cebu; 1722–1728	Succeeded by Manuel de Ocio y Campo
Preceded by Martín de Sarricolea y Olea	Bishop of Calydon; 1722–1728	Succeeded by Juan de Las Peñas
