= Veríssimo de Lencastre =

Roman Catholic cardinal

His Eminence Veríssimo de Lencastre
- Cardinal-Priest
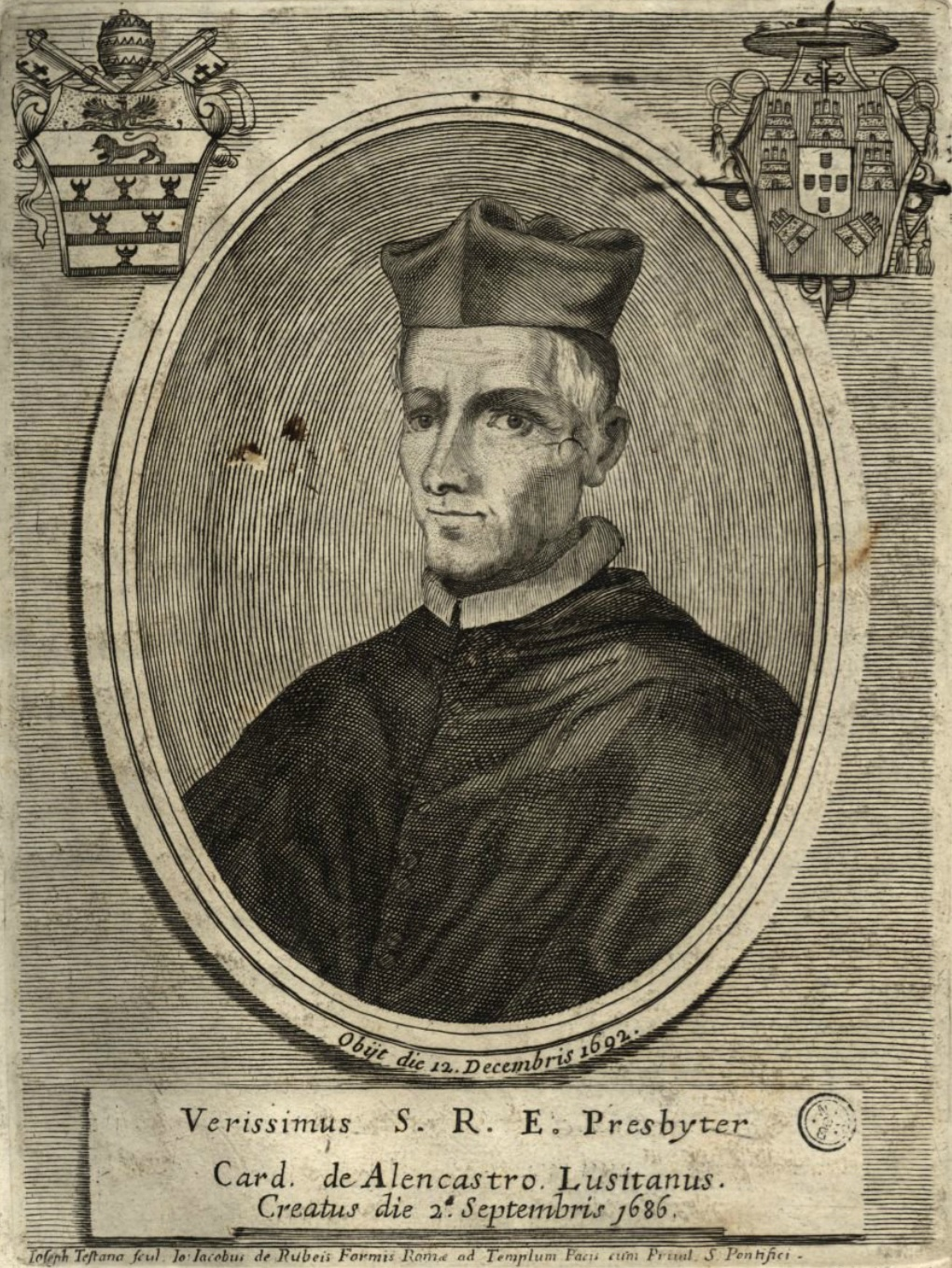
- Church: Roman Catholic Church
- In office: 1686–1692
- Previous post: Archbishop of Braga (1670–1677)

Orders
- Consecration: June 1671 by Francesco Ravizza
- Created cardinal: 2 Sep 1686
- Rank: Cardinal-Priest

Personal details
- Born: 15 November 1615 Lisbon
- Died: 12 December 1692 (aged 77) Lisbon

Veríssimo de Lencastre (15 November 1615 – 12 December 1692) was a Roman Catholic cardinal.

== Biography ==
He was born in Lisbon on November 15, 1615, to Francisco Luís de Lencastre, a commander of the Military Order of Saint Benedict of Aviz, and Filipa de Vilhena.

Pope Innocent XI raised him to the rank of cardinal in the consistory of September 2, 1686.

He died on December 12, 1692, at the age of 77.

== Episcopal succession ==
Episcopal succession of Veríssimo de Lencastre

While bishop, he was the principal consecrator of:

- Lourenço de Castro, Bishop of Angra (1671);
- Francisco Barreto, Bishop of Faro (1671);
- João de Melo, Bishop of Elvas (1671);
- Richard Russell, Bishop of Portalegre (1671);
- Pedro Alencastre, Titular Archbishop of Side (1672);
- José Antonio de Lencastre, Bishop of Miranda (1677);
- Gregório dos Anjos, Bishop of São Luís do Maranhão (1678);
- António de Santa Maria, Titular Bishop of Diocaesarea in Isauria (1678);
- Valerio de São Raimundo, Bishop of Elvas (1683);
- João de Sousa, Bishop of Porto (1684);
- Simão da Gama, Bishop of Faro (1685);
- Alberto de São Gonçalo da Silva, Archbishop of Goa (1686);
- Manoel da Ressurreição, Archbishop of São Salvador da Bahia (1687);
- Victorino do Porto, Bishop of Santiago de Cabo Verde (1687);
- João Franco de Oliveira, Bishop of Angola e Congo (1687);
- Matias de Figueiredo e Mello, Bishop of Olinda (1688);
- Pedro da Silva, Bishop of Cochin (1689);
- Manuel de Moura Manuel, Bishop of Miranda (1689);
- Jerónimo Soares, Bishop of Elvas (1690);
- Agostinho da Anunciação, Archbishop of Goa (1690);
- José Saldanha, Bishop of Funchal (1690);
- João de Casal, Bishop of Macau (1690);
- Antonio a Saint Theresia, Bishop of Malacca (1692); and
- Francisco de Lima (Lemos), Bishop of São Luís do Maranhão (1692).

Catholic Church titles
Preceded by Pedro de Lencastre	Archbishop of Braga; 1670–1677	Succeeded by Luís de Sousa
Preceded by	Cardinal-Priest; 1686–1692	Succeeded by
