= Mar Sabor and Mar Afroth Church, Akaparambu =

Church in Kerala, India

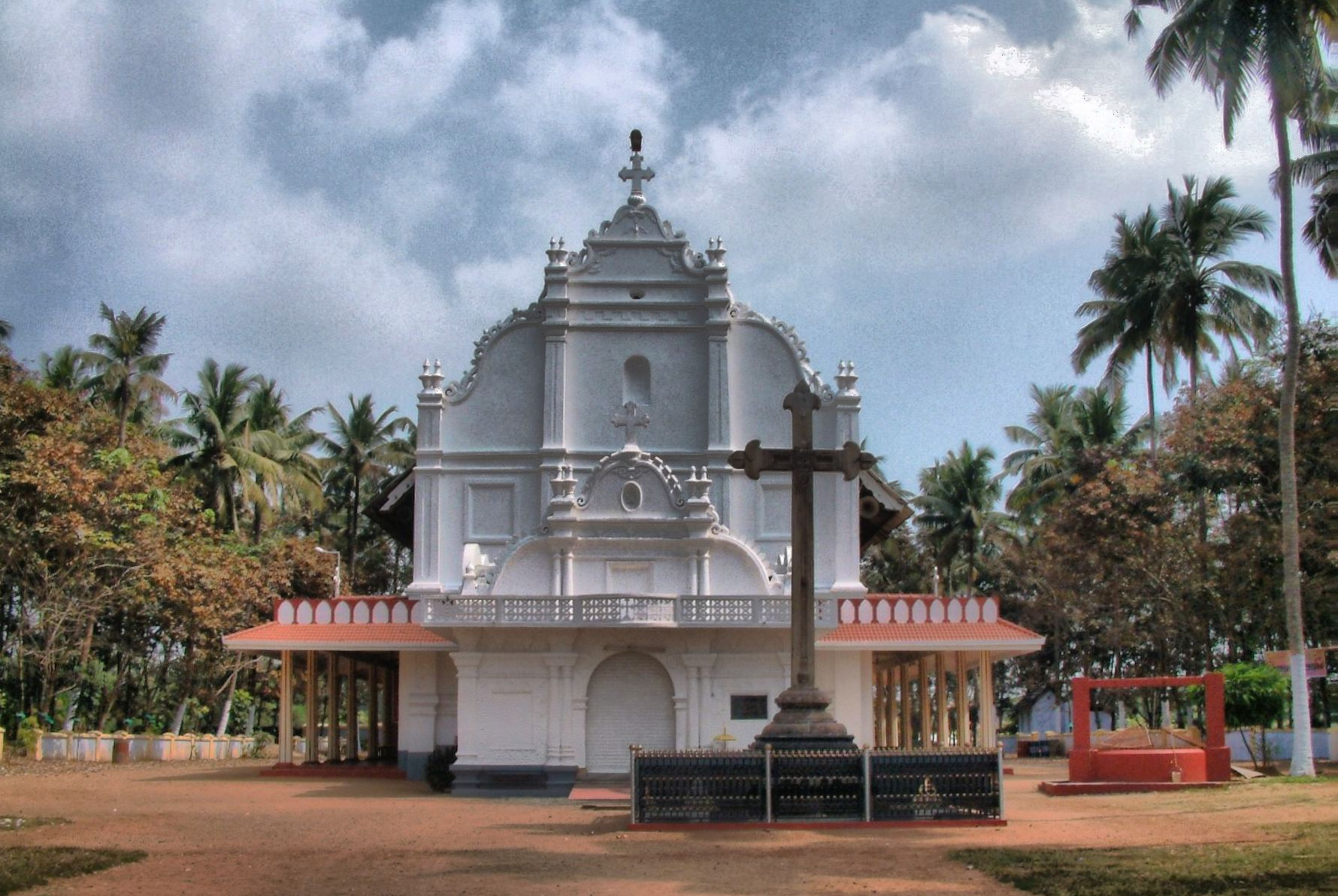
- Mar Sabor and Mar Afroth Church, Akaparambu

Religion
- Affiliation: Malankara Jacobite Syrian Orthodox Church
- District: Ernakulam
- Province: Kerala

Location
- Location: Akaparambu, Angamaly, India

Architecture
- Type: Church
- Style: Kerala Architecture
- Completed: 825 CE
- Direction of façade: West

Mar Sabor and Mar Afroth Church, Akaparambu is one of the ancient churches in Kerala. In ancient records the church is referred to as the Akaparambu Valiyapally.

== History ==
The church is famous for the beautiful ancient mural paintings. The Bishop Mar Gregorios Vayaliparambil (1899–1966) belonged to this parish church. For long time the church at Ankamaly and the Mor Sabor and Mor Afroth chapel at Akaparambu were a united parish and was administered by one council.

== Mar Sabor & Mar Afroth ==
Mar Sabor and Mar Afroth were two holy men who came to Kollam to preach the Gospel with a group of Syriac Christian immigrants led by a merchant named Marwan Sapir Iso. They were said to have landed at Quilon (Kollam) in 823 AD.

The Venad ruler Ayyan Adigal Thiruvadigal gave in 849 AD, Marwan Sapir Iso and his community who settled down at Kollam in the present day Thevally area a set of copper plates with privileges and a village inhabited by lower castes, as it was the custom in those days to entertain foreign merchants.

Marwan Sapir Iso and his community who came to Kollam settled in the village given by the Rajah, started the Kollavarsham or the Nasrani Era in 825 AD. This community were to be known as Nazaranies, and this community grew into a major Syrian Christian community in Kerala from Kollam to Kunnamkulam area. Mar Sabore and Mar Aphroth went around this belt converting people to syriac christianity and also establishing churches.They were brought up by these monks in the tradition of Antiochene faith.

When the Portuguese came to Kerala, they found that this community using Syriac liturgy and therefore they called them Syriac Christians to distinguish them from Latin Christians converted by the Portuguese who were using Latin liturgy. Mar Sapor elevated a local convert to the position of a catechist (kathanar) and he became famous as a Kadamuttath Kathanar.

The church at Akaparambu is believed to have been established in A.D. 825.

== Gallery ==
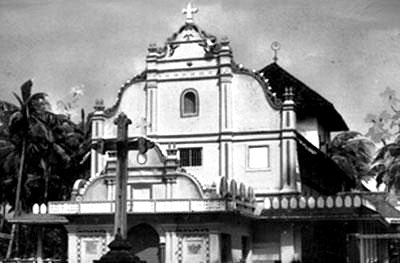
Old File

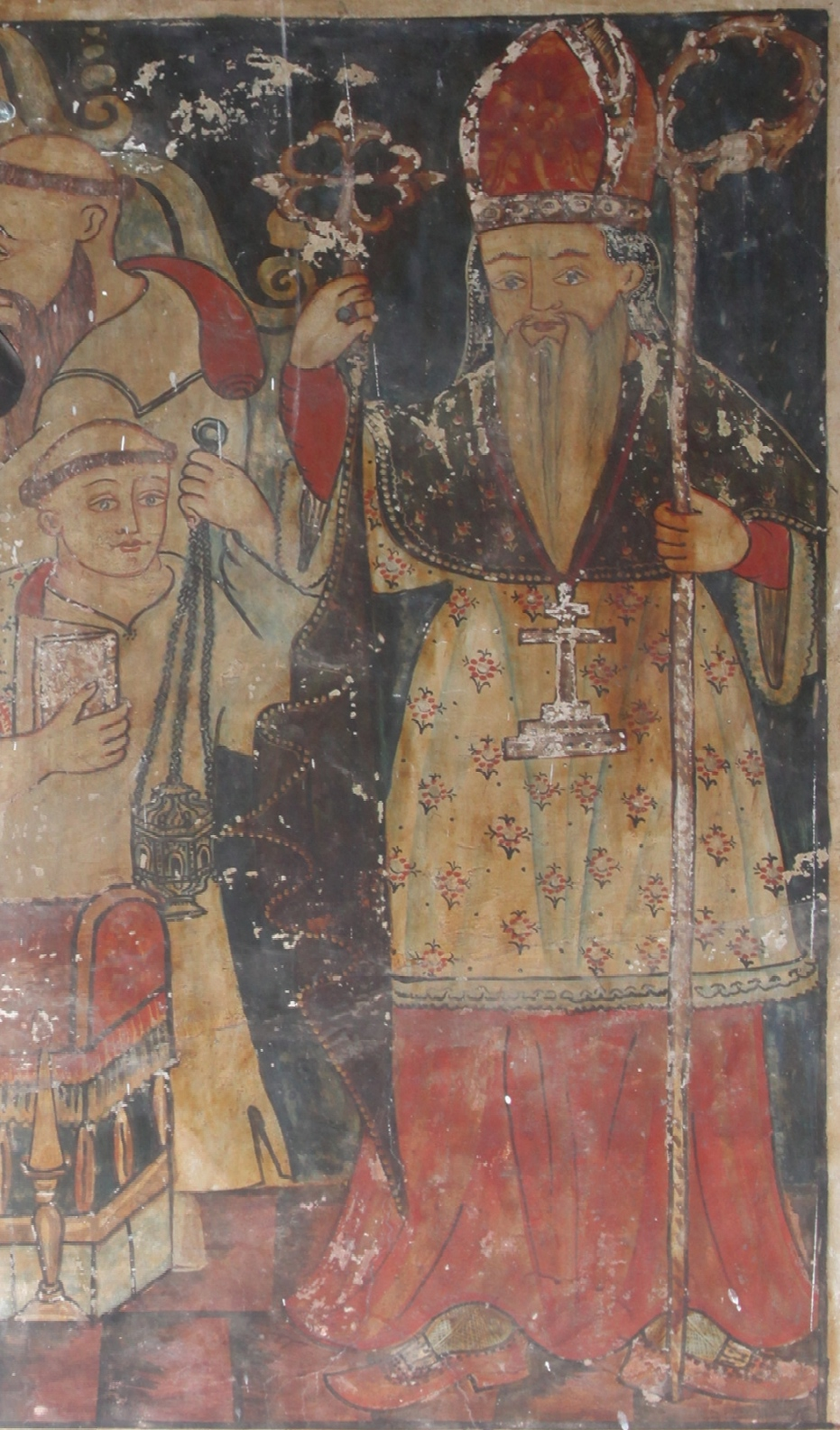
Mural of Archdeacon Giwargis from Akaparambu Church

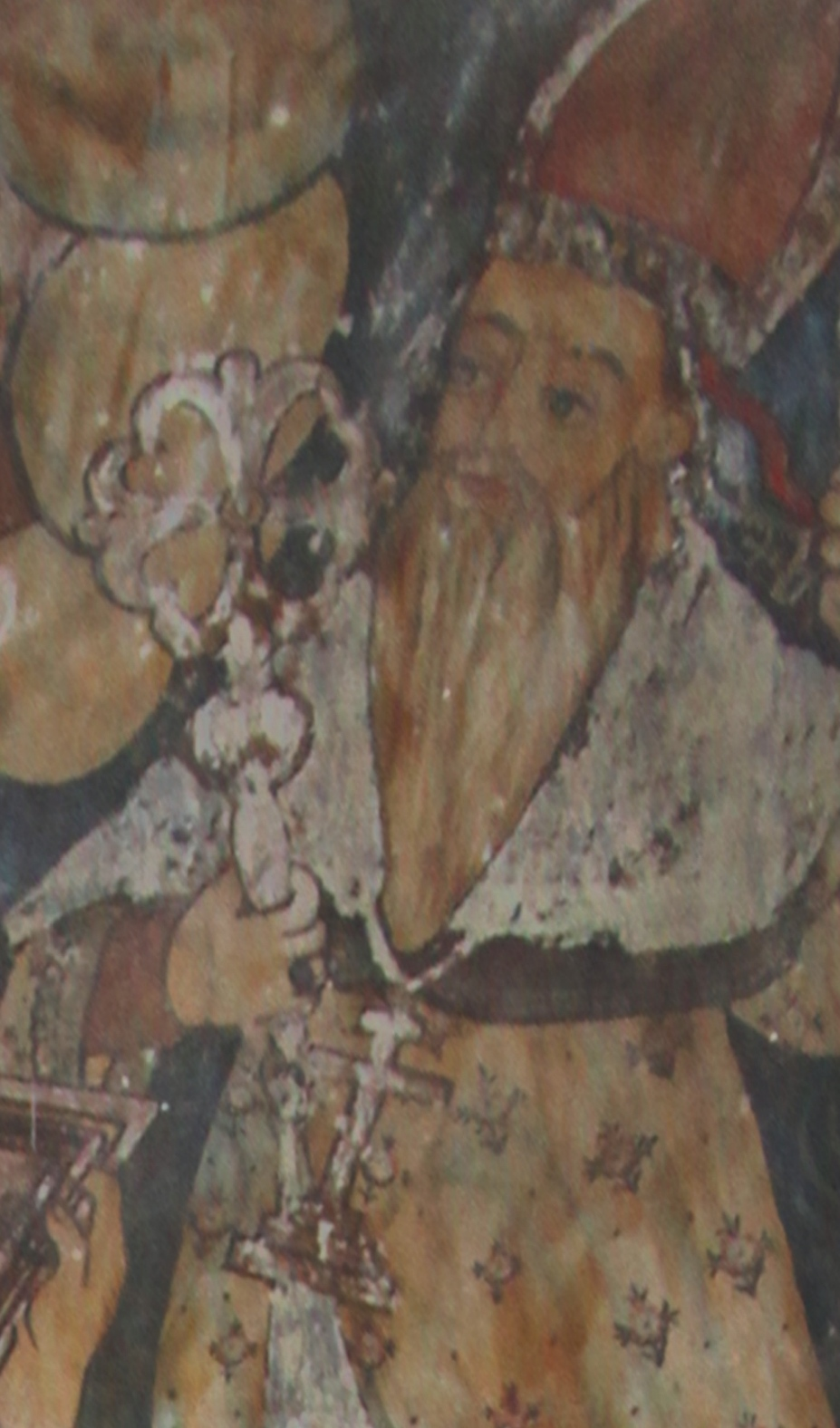
Another mural from Akaparambu Church
