= João Pinto da Piedade =

Roman Catholic prelate (1564–1628)

Most Reverend João Pinto da Piedade
- Bishop of Macau
- Church: Catholic Church
- Diocese: Diocese of Macau
- In office: 1604–1623
- Predecessor: Leonardo Fernandes de Sá
- Successor: João de Casal

Orders
- Consecration: Nov 1604

Personal details
- Born: 1564 Abrantes, Portugal
- Died: 28 Jun 1628 (age 64)

João Pinto da Piedade, O.P. (Latin: Joannes de Abrantes a Pictate) was a Roman Catholic prelate who served as Bishop of Macau (1604–1623).

== Biography ==
João Pinto da Piedade was born in 1564 in Abrantes, Portugal. He was ordained in the Order of Preachers. On 30 Aug 1604, he was appointed during the papacy of Pope Clement VIII as Bishop of Macau. In Nov 1604, he was consecrated bishop. He arrived in India in 1605. In 1615, he renounced his title and left for Europe with fellow Dominican Antonio de Rosario replacing him as administrator (who was later appointed Bishop of Malacca). His resignation was accepted by Pope Urban VIII on 27 October 1623. He died on 28 Jun 1628.

Catholic Church titles
Preceded by Leonardo Fernandes de Sá	Bishop of Macau; 1604–1623	Succeeded by João de Casal
