= Diego Núñez de Figueroa =

Roman Catholic prelate

Most Reverend Diego Núñez de Figueroa
- Bishop-Elect of Macau
- Church: Catholic Church
- Diocese: Diocese of Macau
- In office: 1576–1578
- Predecessor: None
- Successor: Melchior Miguel Carniero Leitão (administrator)

Diego Núñez de Figueroa (Latin: Didacus Nunnez Figueira) was a Roman Catholic prelate who served as Bishop-Elect of Macau (1576–1578).

== Biography ==
On 26 Jan 1576, Diego Núñez de Figueroa was appointed during the papacy of Pope Gregory XIII as Bishop of Macau. He was not consecrated and resigned as Bishop-Elect of Macau in 1578. He never went to China.

Catholic Church titles
Preceded by None	Bishop-Elect of Macau; 1576–1578	Succeeded by Melchior Miguel Carniero Leitão (administrator)
