= Giwargis of Christ =

16th century Saint Thomas Christian Archdeacon

- Archdeacon of All India; Archdeacon of Angamaly; Bishop-elect of Palur
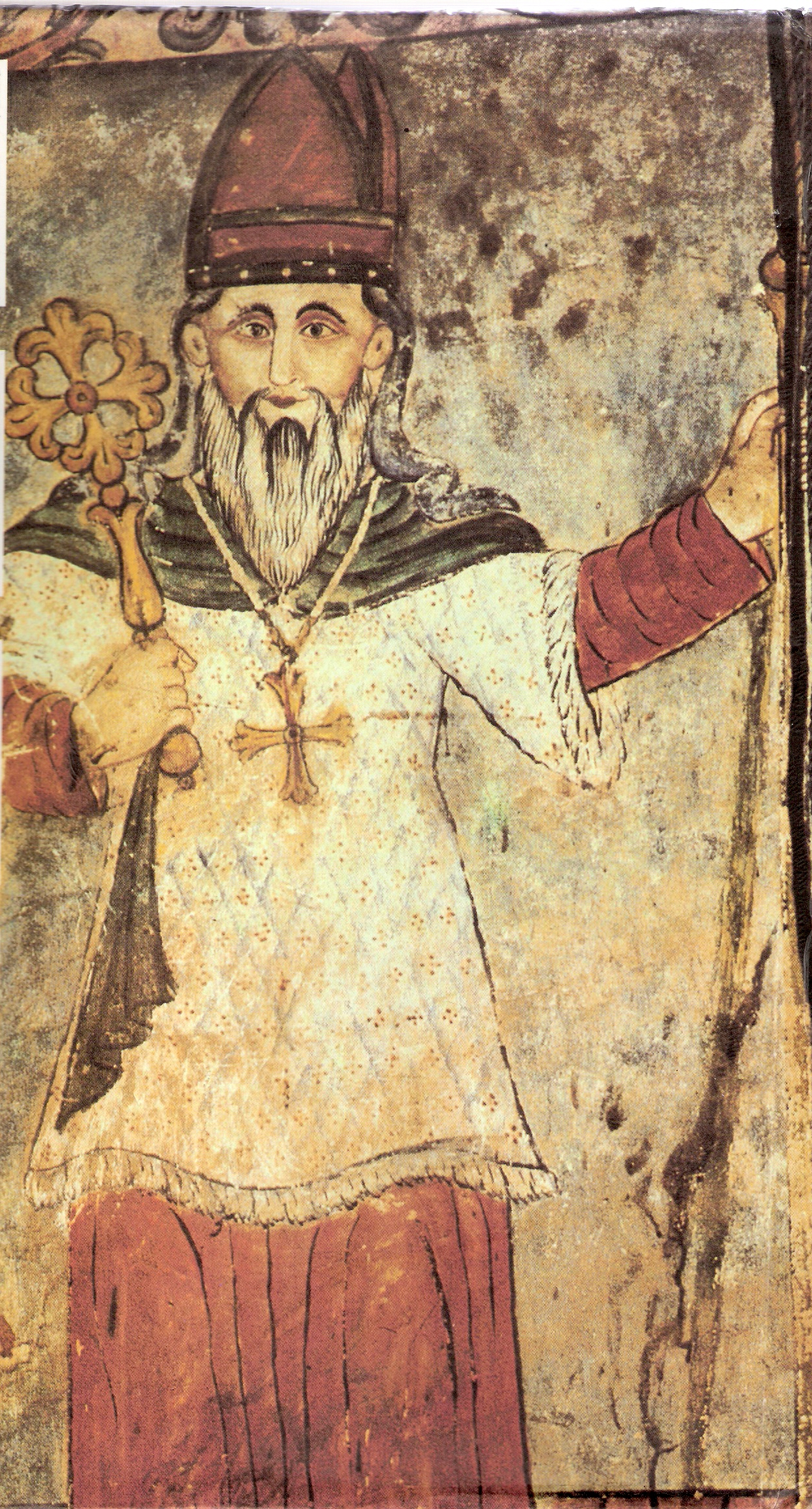
- Archdiocese: Angamaly
- Appointed: by Metropolitan Joseph Sulaqa
- Predecessor: Giwargis the Elder
- Successor: Yohannan, Giwargis of the Cross
- Opposed to: Jacob Pakalomattam

Personal details
- Died: c. AD 1585

Giwargis of Christ (Syriac: ܓܝܼܘܲܪܓܝܼܣ ܕܡܫܝܚܐ) (died c. AD 1585), also spelled Geevarghese of Christ and George of Christ, was an Archdeacon (Arkkadyakon) and hence the leader of the Saint Thomas Christian community of India. He was a biblical expert and a master of Syriac language and literature. He was considered a holy person and also extremely efficient in administration. He was contemporary to Archbishop Mar Abraham of Angamaly. He is credited with the new construction of Marth Maryam Church Angamaly

The archdeacon during the first part of the reign of Mar Abraham was Givargis of Christ, who was on friendly terms with the Latin missionaries and was to be appointed the successor of Mar Abraham as metropolitan of India. Thus he should have become, according to the plans of Mar Abraham, supported by the Jesuits, the first indigenous Chaldaean Metropolitan of the St Thomas Christians. However, the last letter of Mar Abraham, where his requisition letter to the Pope to confirm Givargis' ordination as bishop of Palur and as his successor is dated 13 January 1584. While from another letter of the same Mar Abraham, we are informed that the consecration of Givargis failed because of the latter’s death. Great mural paintings in the Angamaly Cheriyapally church are; "Hell", "Last Judgement", also of mural paintings of the Bishops and the Archdeacon.

Givargis of Christ died in Angamaly. He was buried in the St Mary's Church in Angamaly. His brother Yohannan was Archdeacon (1585–93).

== Identity ==
Giwargis of Christ was a nephew of Giwargis the Elder as recorded by Patriarch Mar Abdisho IV Maron in 1566.

== Archdeacon under Mar Yawsep ==
Giwargis was appointed archdeacon by Mar Yawsep, the first Chaldean Catholic metropolitan of India. Yawsep opposed Mar Abraham, who arrived in Malabar originally as an orthodox East Syriac metropolitan before 1556 much before his own arrival. Abraham had established himself in the Vatakkumkūr Kingdom where Portuguese influence was minimal. The Portuguese were completely reluctant to let Eastern bishops in Malabar and had detained Mar Yawsep and those who came with him, including the Papal legate Ambrose Buttigieg, for about 18 months in Goa. However in order to oppose Mar Abraham, they allowed Mar Yawsep to briefly occupy his see in Malabar. Giwargis initially served as the archdeacon under Mar Yawsep. Abraham was arrested by the Portuguese in 1558 and on the way to Portugal, he escaped from their captivity in Mozambique and went to meet Patriarch Abdisho IV in Gazarta. With the Chaldean patriarch's recommendation, he met the Pope Pius IV in Rome in 1565 and managed to obtain papal confirmation and goodwill.

By this time, the Portuguese had already arrested Yawsep and deported him to Lisbon in 1562, accusing him of being a 'Nestorian heretic'. He was sent back to Malabar with papal approval, only to be arrested for a third time by the Portuguese in 1567. Francisco Dionysio reports in 1578 that Yawsep appointed two archdeacons, before being captured by the Portuguese, one each for the Northerners and for the Southerners. Giwargis was entrusted with the north and was also given the overall charge of the diocese as the person responsible for the south had already died. Kollaparambil gives two possible explanations for this incident. Perhaps the archdeacon appointed by Abraham was accommodated in charge of the southern region by Yawsep. Otherwise, the two archdeacons may be associated with the Northists and Southists ethnic factions. Perczel favours the latter explanation for Dionysio's account.

Meanwhile, the Pope had suggested the Chaldean patriarch to divide the Indian archdiocese between Yawsep and Abraham. But Yawsep could not return to Malabar and died in Rome in 1569, after having been arrested and exiled by the Portuguese in 1567.

== Under Mar Abraham ==
Patriarch Abdisho IV appointed Abraham as the Archbishop of Angamaly with papal confirmation and sent him to India with papal mandate. On arrival, Portuguese arrested him and detained him in Goa. For a second time, Abraham escaped the Portuguese captivity and escaped to Malabar and settled in the interior settlement of Angamaly. Choosing Angamaly as the metropolitan see was Abraham's strategic decision, as it offered him three benefits: political protection away from Portuguese-allied coastline kingdoms such as Cochin and Kollam, an appanage government system characterised by a hierarchical dynastic federation of the four Mangate Swaroopam rulers and very strong orthodox East Syriac Christian presence. Abraham had also recommended to the Chaldean patriarch that Giwargis, the archdeacon of Mar Yawsep, be appointed as his suffragan bishop. Abraham administered the church in Angamaly along with Giwargis, who was appointed accordingly as 'Bishop of Palur' by the patriarch. The patriarch also gave Abraham the permission to consecrate Giwargis as a bishop.

=== Rival archdeacon and Schism ===
Around this time, an orthodox East Syriac bishop named Mar Simeon arrived in Malabar. Simeon managed to obtain the support of Archdeacon Yaqov who was based in the Vatakkumkūr Kingdom.

== Early Latinization attempts ==
The presence of the rival bishop and archdeacon in the Vatakkumkūr Kingdom became a crisis for Abraham. To gain the support of the Portuguese, he was forced to outwardly implement their policies. Yielding to their insistence, Abraham convened a Synod in Angamaly as suggested by Alexandro Valignano in 1583. Mar Abraham tried to preserve the East Syriac rite he had practiced to the extent as possible. The Portuguese Jesuits, who were wary of Abraham's unwavering allegiance to the East Syriac Rite, never really trusted him. As they did not know the Syriac language, they were unable to ascertain whether he was implementing the changes they had proposed.

Meanwhile, Giwargis was already an expert in Classical Syriac 'as if it were his mother-tongue', according to Fransisco Dionysio. The Jesuits saw in him the perfect candidate who could help them implement latinization in the Syro-Malabaric rite and whose consecration as co-adjutor bishop with succession rights could end the line of Chaldean bishops in Malabar. Giwargis had started to study Latin and was ready to say the Latin mass. The Jesuits therefore, repeatedly persuaded Giwargis to accept episcopacy. However, Giwargis repeatedly refused to accept episcopal rank.

=== Foundation of Church of Assumption of Mary ===
In 1575, Giwargis founded the Cheriapalli in Angamaly dedicated to St. Mary (of Assumption) as the seat of the Archdeaconate while the older Valiyapalli remained as the parish church for the local Christians. In 1580, papal endorsement was given for Giwargis' episcopal consecration, in response to the request of the Jesuits. However the consecration did not happen till 1584, when Abraham wrote a letter requesting the pope to grant confirmation for Giwargis' consecration.

=== Failure of the episcopal succession plan ===
Francisco Dionysio writes in 1578 that although Giwargis honoured the episcopal rank, he was not willing to accept it due to his humility, instead wishing to remain a humble servant of the Archbishop. Meanwhile, Francisco Roz, who later emerged as Abraham's main opponent, claims in 1622 that Abraham never really wanted to consecrate Giwargis. However, Perczel notes that it was originally Abraham's idea to consecrate Giwargis to resist the Portuguese pressure. The Portuguese, having forged a cordial relationship with Giwargis, later took up the plan. It is possible that Abraham continued to postpone Giwargis' consecration, considering his growing friendship with the Portuguese who were overtly enthusiastic to have the consecration done. Kollaparambil finds Roz's accusation strange, because Dionysio's letter in 1578 makes it clear that Giwargis refused episcopal rank out of modesty despite the Portuguese having repeatedly tried to persuade him.

== Death and Succession ==
The exact year of the death of Giwargis of Christ is not documented. There is no mention of Giwargis of Christ in the historical records after 1584. Istvan Perczel, an expert in Saint Thomas Christian history, wrote in his earlier works on the topic that one of Abraham's letters in 1984 records the failure of Giwargis of Christ's consecration due to the latter's death. It is recorded that a vacancy for the archdeaconate occurred in 1591. Therefore, Giwargis of Christ may have died by 1585 or 1591. Giwargis of the Cross was appointed as archdeacon in 1593.

Cassanar Lona is recorded as an archdeacon who contributed to the expenses of rebuilding the Vapicotta Church in a Portuguese report. The church in Vapicotta was arsoned by the Muslims during a sectarian conflict with the Christians in 1584. The conflict was triggered by the protest of Christians against the extension of certain privileges, which were until then exclusively enjoyed by the Christians, to the Muslims by the King of Paravur. Kollaparambil identifies Lona with Cassanar John, the son of Giwargis of Christ's brother. John was recommended by the Portuguese to be appointed as Giwargis' archdeacon when Giwargis would succeed Mar Abraham as the next metropolitan of Angamaly. As Abraham outlived Giwargis, he may have appointed John as his next archdeacon, in accordance with the line of dynastic succession. The Portuguese, in relation to the appointment of Giwargis of Cross in 1593, claimed that Mar Abraham had appointed archdeacons circumventing their seniority based on the support they offered him against the Portuguese. This makes it more probable that Lona's term ended in 1591.

== Angamaly - Akapparambu Murals ==
The Jacobite Churches in Angamaly and Akaparambu are adorned with numerous frescoes and decorative motifs. These include murals of certain clerical figures, of which the one in Angamaly Jacobite Church was described as depicting Archdeacon Giwargis of Christ by church historian George Menachery in his book "the Indian Church History Classics" in 1988. John Fenwick reproduced the image from the book but described it as an 18th century depiction of a Christian cleric. Indian Orthodox apologetic church historian Kurian Maledath disagreed with Menachery, and identified the figure with Thoma I instead, accusing him of deliberate Roman Catholic bias. Menachery responded to the criticism by saying:

"Both in 1971 and in 1997 when I visited the church to take photographs, and on my other visits to the church the priests and elders of the locality were unanimously of opinion that this was the picture of Archdeacon or Arkhadayakon Gheevarghese of Christ who was appointed bishop of Palayur but did not take charge... It was in the light of these findings that I had described the picture to be of Archdeacon Gheevarghese".

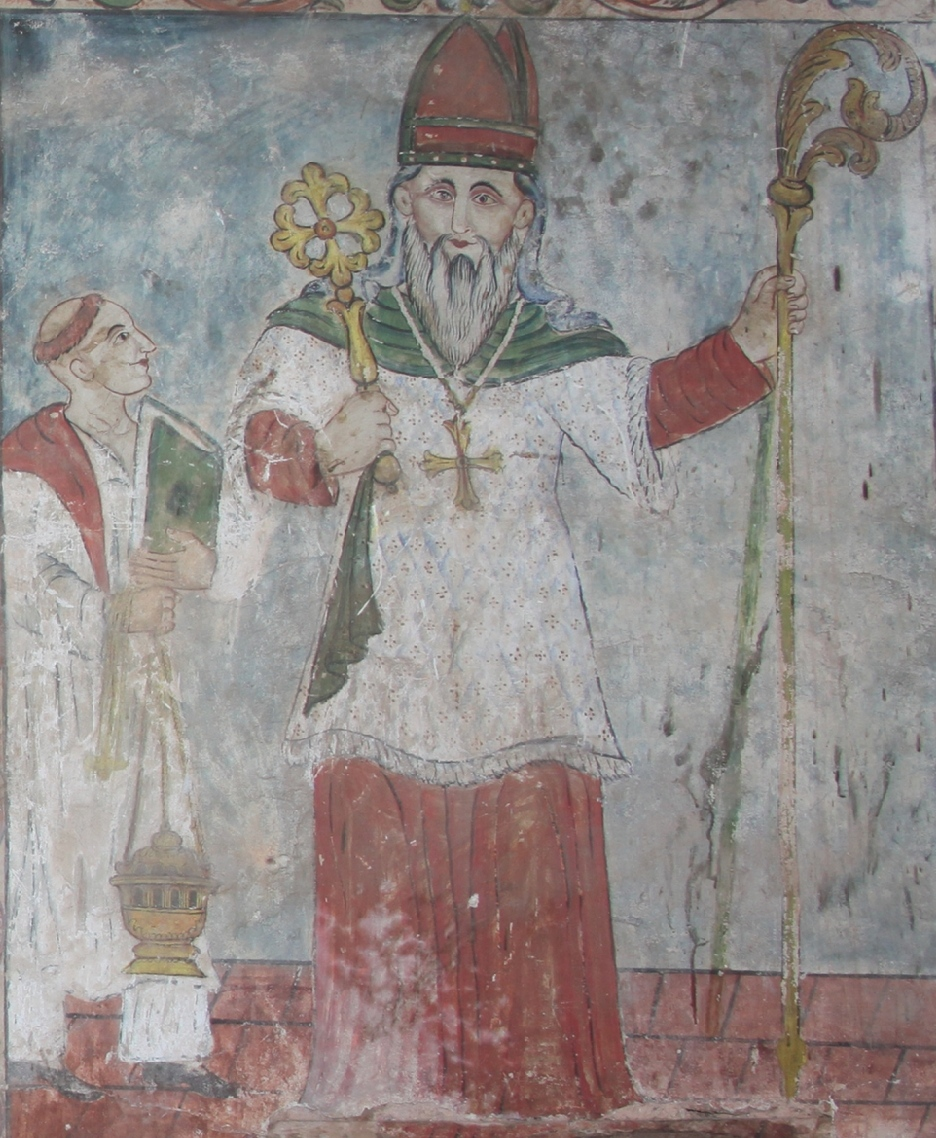
Mural from the Angamaly Marth Maryam pally

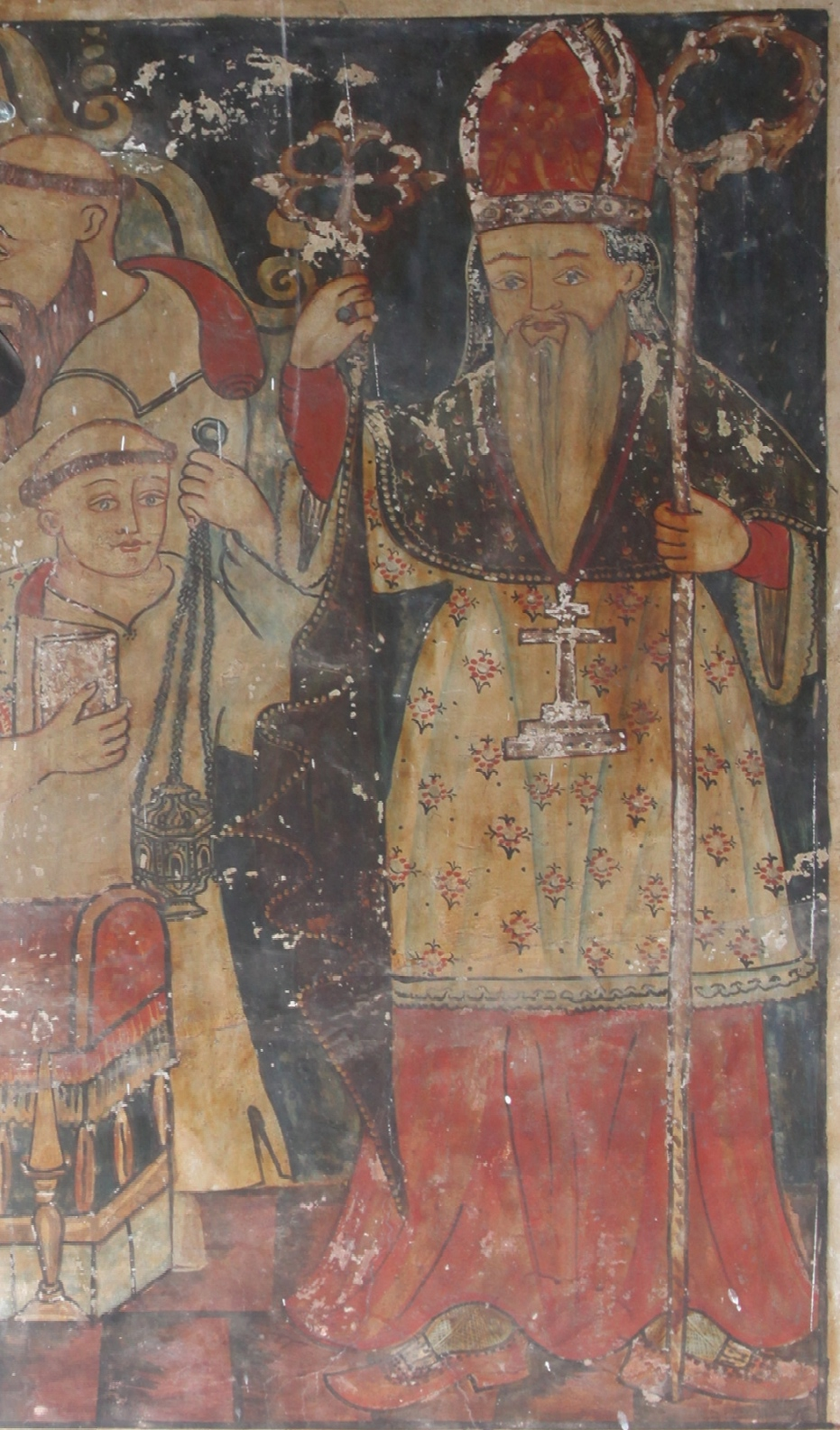
Mural from Akaparambu Church

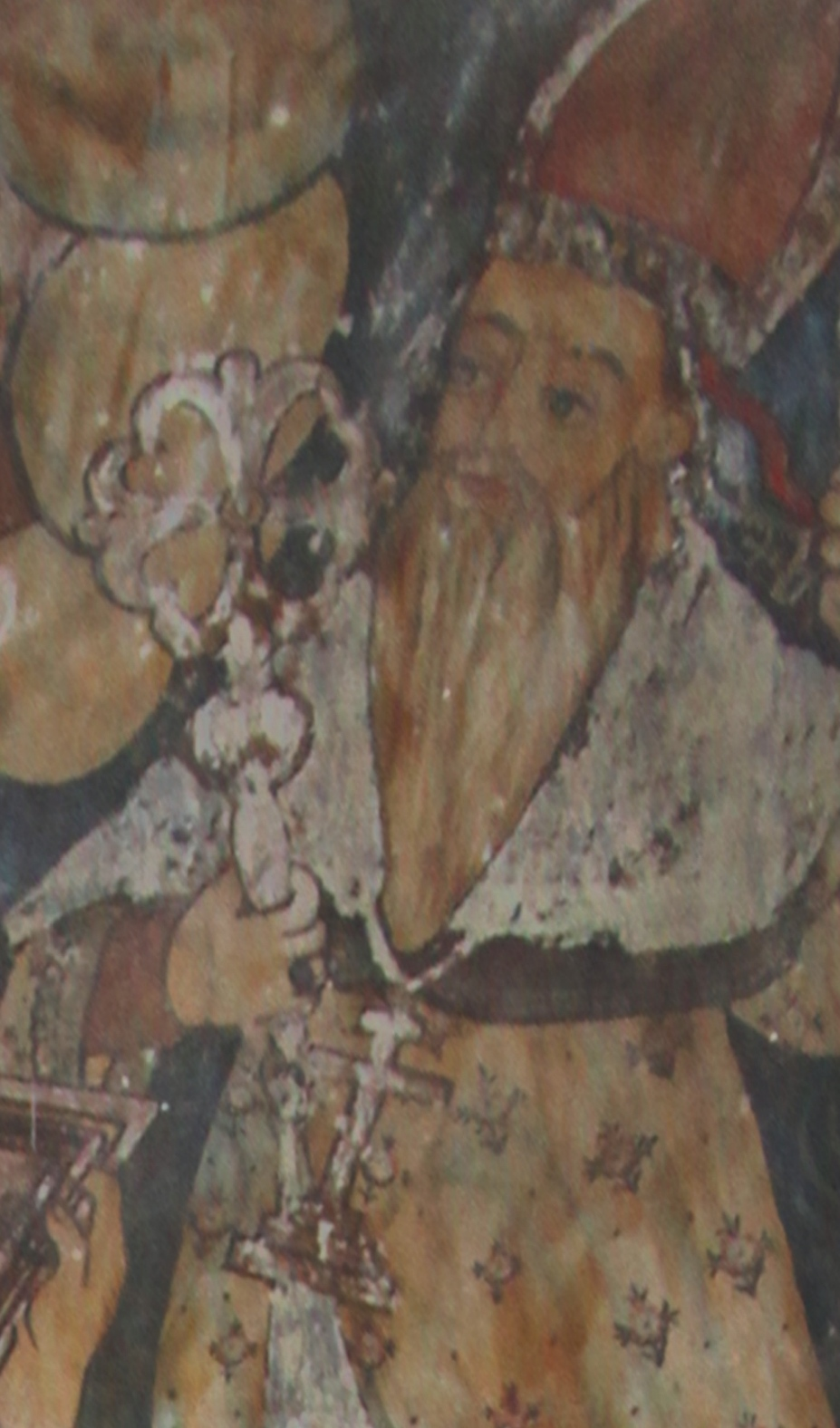
Another mural from Akaparambu Church

== See also ==
- Mar Abraham
- Christianity in India
- Church of the East
- India (East Syrian Ecclesiastical Province)
- Malankara Jacobite Syrian Orthodox Church
- Syrian Malabar Nasrani
