= João de Casal =

Roman Catholic prelate (1641–1735)

Most Reverend João de Casal
- Bishop of Macau
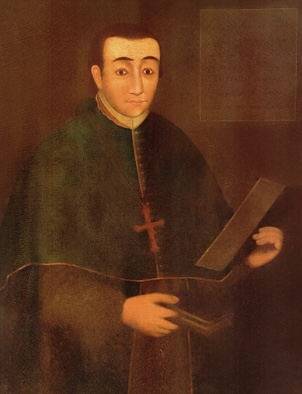
- Church: Catholic Church
- Diocese: Diocese of Macau
- In office: 1690–1735
- Predecessor: João Pinto da Piedade
- Successor: Eugénio Trigueiros

Orders
- Consecration: 25 Jul 1690 by Veríssimo de Lencastre with Agostinho da Anunciação and José Saldanha as co-consecrators

Personal details
- Born: 1641 Castelo de Vide, Alentejo, Portugal
- Died: 20 Sep 1735 (age 94)

João de Casal, O.S.A. (Latin: Joannes do Casal) was a Roman Catholic prelate who served as Bishop of Macau (1690–1735).

== Biography ==
João de Casal was born in Castelo de Vide, province of Alentejo, Portugal in 1641. He was ordained in the Order of Saint Augustine. On 10 Apr 1690, he was appointed during the papacy of Pope Alexander VIII as Bishop of Macau. On 25 Jul 1690, he was consecrated bishop by Veríssimo de Lencastre, Archbishop Emeritus of Braga with Agostinho da Anunciação, Archbishop of Goa, and José Saldanha, Bishop of Funchal, serving as co-consecrators. He took possession of the diocese on 20 June 1692. He died on 20 Sep 1735.

== Episcopal succession ==
Episcopal succession of João de Casal

While bishop, he served as the principal consecrator of:

- Alessandro Ciceri, Bishop of Nanking (1696);
- Emmanuel a Santo Antonio, Bishop of Malacca (1705);
- Sebastián Foronda, Titular Bishop of Calydon (1723); and
- Eugénio Trigueiros, Titular Bishop of Verinopolis (1727).

He also served as the principal co-consecrator of:

- St. Pedro Sanz y Jordá, Titular Bishop of Mauricastro (1730).

Catholic Church titles
Preceded by João Pinto da Piedade	Bishop of Macau; 1690–1735	Succeeded by Eugénio Trigueiros
