= Melchior Carneiro =

Portuguese bishop

His Excellency, The Most Reverend Belchior Carneiro Leitão S.J.
- Patriarch of Ethiopia
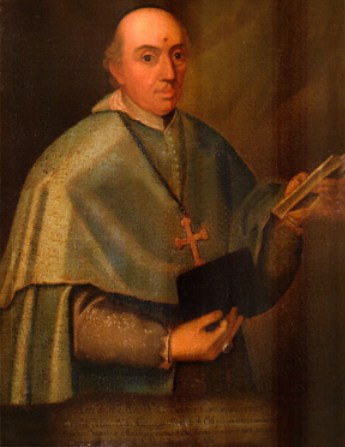
- Church: Catholic Church
- In office: 9 July 1577 – 19 August 1583
- Predecessor: Andrés de Oviedo
- Successor: Afonso Mendes
- Other post: Titular Bishop of Nicaea (1555-1583)
- Previous post: Coadjutor Patriarch of Ethiopia (1555-1577)

Orders
- Consecration: 15 December 1560 by João Nunes Barreto

Personal details
- Born: 1516 Coimbra, Kingdom of Portugal
- Died: 19 August 1583 (aged 66–67) Portuguese Macau

Belchior Carneiro Leitão, SJ, often known as Melchior Carneiro (1516 – 19 August 1583) was a Portuguese Jesuit missionary bishop. He was one of the first Jesuit bishops.

== Life ==
He entered the Society of Jesus on 25 April 1543 and was appointed in 1551 the first rector of the College of Évora, and shortly after transferred to the rectorship of the College of Lisbon. When, in 1553, Simão Rodrigues, the first provincial of Portugal, was summoned to Rome to answer charges made against his administration, the visitor, Nadal, assigned him Carneiro as a companion.

In the meantime King John III of Portugal, a friend and patron of the Jesuits, had written both to Pope Julius III and to Ignatius Loyola, requesting the appointment of a Jesuit as Patriarch of Ethiopia. On 23 January 1555 the Pope chose João Nunes Barreto, giving him at the same time two coadjutors with the right of succession, Andrés de Oviedo, titular bishop of Hieropolis, and Carneiro, titular bishop of Nicaea. Barreto and Oviedo were consecrated 5 May 1555 in Lisbon, and were the first Jesuits to be raised to the episcopal dignity. The pope had given them an order of obedience to accept consecration, and Loyola acquiesced, considering that the dignity carried with it hardship and suffering rather than honour.

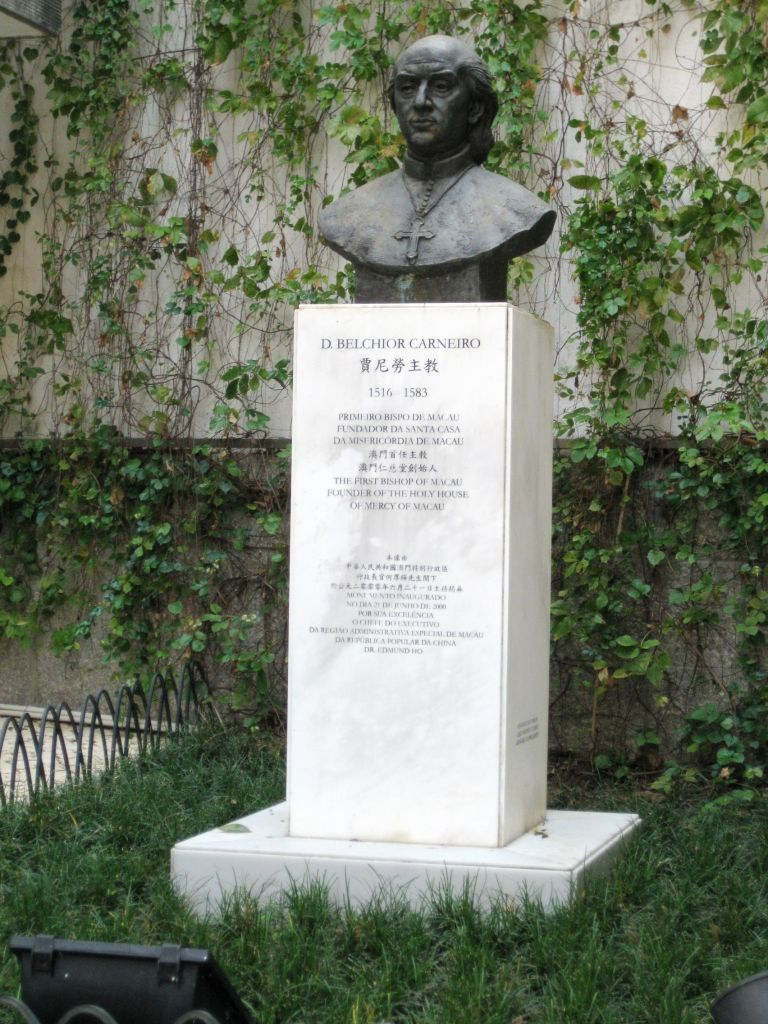
Bust of Belchior Carneiro in Macau

Unable to enter his missionary field of Ethiopia, Carneiro set out for Portuguese India and landed at Goa. Not having been consecrated before leaving Portugal, he was finally ordained bishop 15 December 1560 by Barreto. Not able to fulfil his original assignment, he received the brief Ex Litteris carissimis from Pope Pius V in 1566 appointing him apostolic administrator for the Portuguese missions in Japan and China. He continued to labour on the Malabar coast until 1567, when he was invited to come to Macau where the Jesuits had established a mission. He arrived there in June 1568, thereby becoming the first consecrated bishop in the region of China and Japan. His work there was rewarded when the Diocese of Macau was established in 1576 by Pope Gregory XIII.

The first papal nominee to be Bishop of Macau in 1576 was not Carneiro, but rather Diogo Nunes de Figueira, who declined the appointment and never travelled to Macau. The second nominee in 1578 was Leonardo Fernandes de Sá, who did not arrive in Macau until 1581. As a result, Carneiro served as administrator of the new diocese from 1576 to 1581. He became the nominal Patriarch of Ethiopia in 1577 upon the death of Oviedo, though he was never able to travel there. After the arrival of Sá, Carneiro retired to the home of the Society of Jesus at Macau, where he died in 1583.

== Works ==
Carneiro wrote some letters of historical interest, one from Mozambique, one from Goa, and two from Macau. They are printed in various collections.

| Preceded by Diego Núñez de Figueroa; Bishop-Elect | Administrator of Macau; 1576-1581 | Succeeded by Leonardo Fernandes de Sá |
| Preceded by Andrés de Oviedo | Patriarch of Ethiopia; 1577-1581 | Succeeded by Afonso Mendes |
