= Fremona =

Town in Tigray Region, Ethiopia

Fremona ፍሬሞና
- Location within Ethiopia
- Coordinates: 14°17′N 38°54′E
- Country: Ethiopia
- Region: Tigray
- Time zone: UTC+3 (EAT)

Fremona (Tigrinya: ፍሬሞና, fəremona) was a town in Tigray Region, Ethiopia. It was about a mile in circumference and was flanked with towers. The town served as the base of the Roman Catholic missionaries to Ethiopia during the 16th and 17th centuries. Bernhard Lindahl identifies Fremona with the modern settlement of Endiet Nebersh, located 10 kilometers from Adwa.

== History ==
Fremona was originally called "Maigoga" (mai, Tigrinya "water," and guagua, "noisy") because of the two rocky streams that ran through the community. The origin of the name is uncertain but it is very old, appearing on Aksumite inscriptions; it was not renamed by the Jesuit missionaries. It was there that bishop Andrés de Oviedo died and was buried in 1577, and his tomb became a shrine to the local Catholics.

When the Jesuit Manuel de Almeida visited Fremona in 1624, he found that it had been improved with "seven or eight bastions with high curtain walls, two courtyards, one of which adjoins the houses, where a good stone tank has been made, and another were a beautiful church was now being built of stone and lime." He adds that due to the rarity of firearms in Ethiopia at the time, "with twenty or thirty muskets, a small cannon and the sons of the Portuguese manning them, [it] was held in Ethiopia to be a unique and impregnable place."

It was here that the Catholic priests, patriarch and bishop were exiled, after Emperor Fasilides condemned Catholicism and restored to official status the traditional beliefs of the Ethiopian Orthodox Tewahedo Church in 1634. At the time, Jerónimo Lobo states that the town had 400 inhabitants.

After the Catholic missionaries were banished from Ethiopia, Fremona was eventually abandoned; the details are unknown. The Ethiopian historian Richard Pankhurst cites a taxation report from 1697 that mentions Fremona under its old name Maigoga. Yet when Henry Salt travelled through the area in the 1800s, he reported that he was unable to find anyone who recognized the name.
