= Andrés de Oviedo =

Spanish missionary

Andrés de Oviedo S.J.
- Patriarch of Ethiopia
- Church: Catholic Church
- In office: 22 December 1562 – 29 June 1577
- Predecessor: João Nunes Barreto
- Successor: Melchior Carneiro
- Previous posts: Titular Archbishop of Hierapolis in Phrygia (1555–1562); Coadjutor Patriarch of Ethiopia (1555–1562)

Orders
- Consecration: 5 May 1555 by Julião de Alva

Personal details
- Born: 1518 Illescas, Kingdom of Toledo, Crown of Castile
- Died: 29 June 1577 (aged 58–59) Fremona, Ethiopian Empire

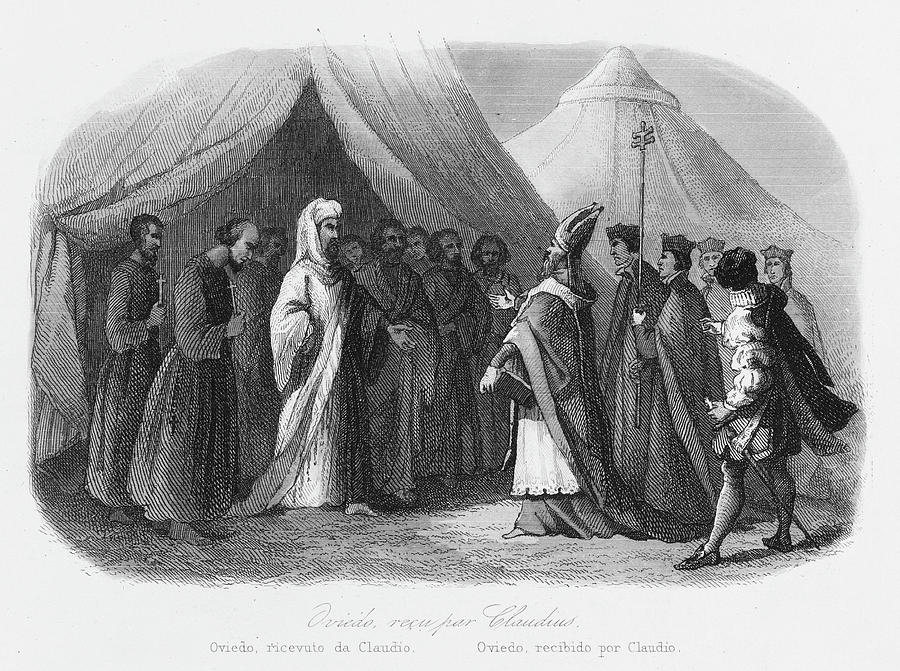
Andrés de Oviedo and Ethiopian Emperor Gelawdewos

Andrés de Oviedo (1518 – 29 June 1577), also known as Andre da Oviedo, was a Spanish Jesuit missionary and Patriarch of Ethiopia.

Oviedo was born in Illescas, Toledo. On 19 June 1541, while in Rome, he entered the Society of Jesus, nine months after it was approved by Pope Paul III. In autumn of that year he travelled to Paris, where he studied theology, although his studies were interrupted by the war between France and Spain, so he continued studying in Louvain, completing in 1544.

He was auxiliary of the Patriarch of Ethiopia João Nunes Barreto in the apostolic mission which began in 1556 under the sponsorship by John III of Portugal and Ignatius of Loyola. With the death of Nunes on 22 December 1562, he succeeded to the Patriarchate. Though the mission's purpose - reconciliation with the Church of Rome - failed, Oviedo remained till the end of his life in Fremona (Ethiopia), at the service of the small Catholic community, where he died on 26 June 1577.

A cause for Oviedo's beatification was opened on 8 June 1630, and he was declared Servant of God.
