= Giwargis of Cross =

16th and 17th century Saint Thomas Christian archdeacon

- Archdeacon of Angamaly and All India (1593–1599); Archdeacon of the Archdiocese of Cranganore (1599–1637)
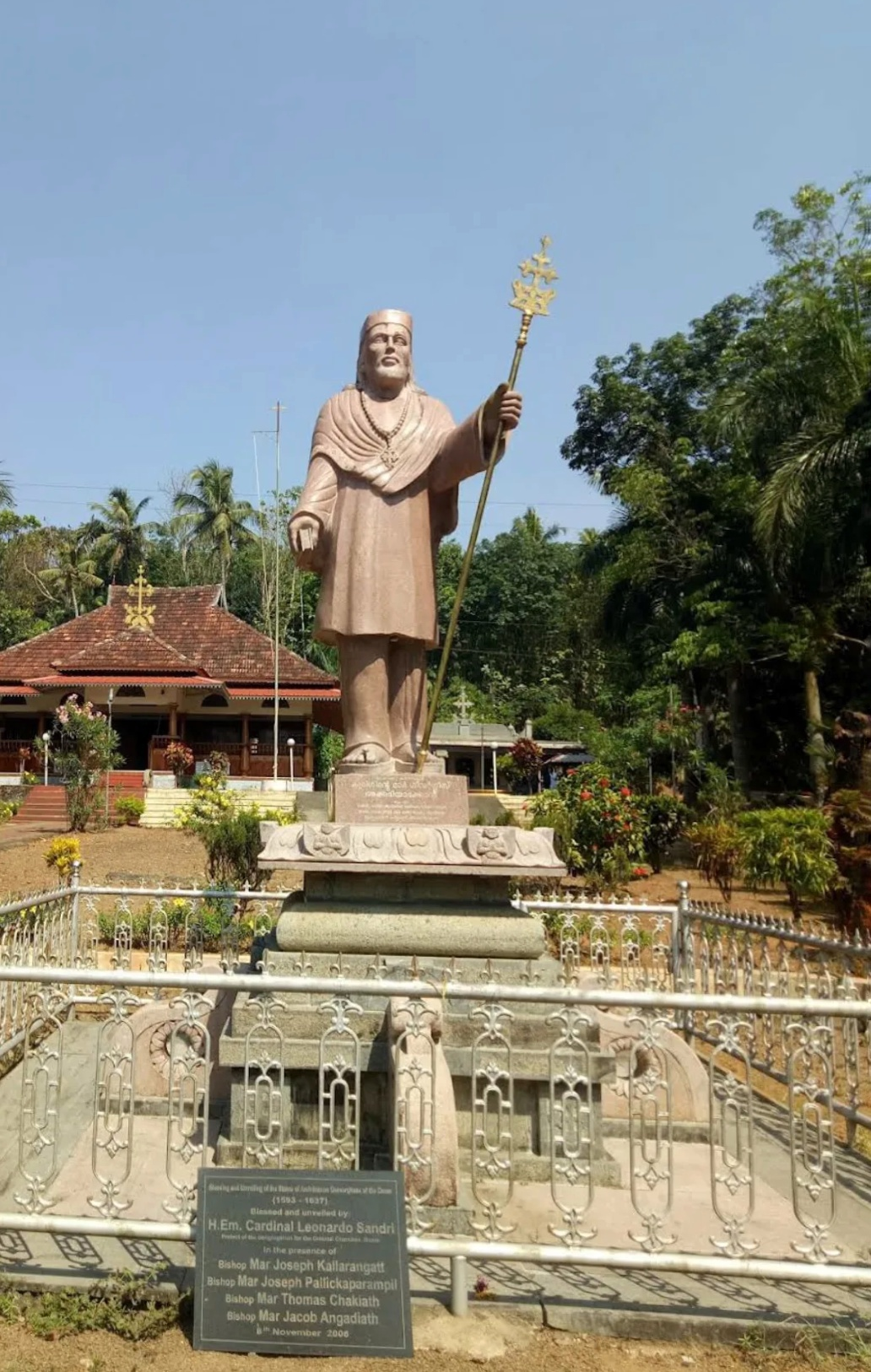
- Appointed: by Abraham of Angamaly
- Successor: Arkadiyakkon Parambil Thoma

Gīwargīs of the Cross (Syriac: ܓܝܼܘܲܪܓܝܼܣ ܕܨܠܝܒܐ, Gīvargīs d'slīva), also spelled Geevarghese of Cross and George of Cross, was an archdeacon (arkkadyakon) and leader of the Saint Thomas Christian community of India. He was the son of the elder brother of Giwargis of Christ. By the last year of Bishop Mar Abraham, he became the Archdeacon. After the Bishop's death in 1597, he led the Indian Church. He led the church amidst Portuguese intervention. The Synod of Diamper (1599) was held during his time. In 1601, Francis Ros became Bishop, appointed by the Archbishop of Goa, Aleixo de Menezes. In the beginning there was cordiality, but the deliberate downgrading of Angamaly and the inertia of Bishop Ros frustrated him. When the Archdeacon protested, Ros excommunicated him. In 1615, the Bishop and Archdeacon reconciled each other, but again fell out later. The next Bishop, Estevão de Brito, also did not recognize the Archdeacon's ecclesiastical status. He led the church in a period of severe stress and turmoil, and held it together. After his time and his brother's time the root family of Pakalomattam became heirless. The only son shifted residence to Alappatt house. He is believed to have been buried in the forefront of Pakalomattam Thravadu (Kuravilangadu).

== Under Mar Abraham (1593-1597) ==
Giwargis of Cross was archdeacon from 1593 to 1637. He was another nephew of Giwargis of Christ and was from Kuravilangad. According to Antonio de Gouvea, a priest named Thoma Curia of Angamaly had a greater claim to the position of archdeacon. Gouvea adds that Giwargis was appointed archdeacon, despite his young age, as he supported Mar Abraham against the Portuguese. In 1594, Abraham submitted a petition to the Pope requesting that Giwargis be declared his co-adjutor and successor. During this period, Mar Abraham and Giwargis had improved their relations with the Jesuits and began to cooperate with them. Giwargis also began studying Syriac under Francisco Roz. At Roz's suggestion, Giwargis was ready to reject orthodox East Syriac theology and instead preach Roman Catholic theology. In 1595, Abraham, who was seriously ill, made a testament declaring Giwargis as the administrator of the archdiocese in his absence. Abraham prepared to consecrate Geevarghese using the authority bestowed upon him by the Chaldean Patriarch, but the Jesuits prevented him from doing so, insisting that the Pope's confirmation was required. Abraham had sought the help of the Jesuits to obtain confirmation from the Pope for his episcopal consecration, but he did not receive such confirmation until his death in 1597. After the death of Mar Abraham, Giwargis took over the administration of the church as per the late metropolitan's will and established tradition.

== Synod of Diamper ==
=== Conflict with Alexis Menezis ===
However, immediately after hearing the news of Mar Abraham's death, Alexis Menezes, the then Padroado Archbishop of Goa, appointed Francisco Roz as the Apostolic vicar of Angamaly, claiming that he had received special faculty from the Pope. Church scholars dispute whether Menezis had actually received such authority from the Pope. Neither the archdeacon nor the native Christians were willing to accept Menesis' decision. Following this, Menezes accepted the archdeacon as governor of the archdiocese, on the condition that Francisco Roz and the rector of the Vaipicotta Seminary would be his advisors. But the archdeacon did not recognise Menezes' nominees. Menezis then reversed his order and appointed Giwargis as the diocesan governor without restrictions, withdrawing the advisors he had previously appointed. Menezis also instructed the archdeacon to make a profession of faith in front of the rector of the Vaipicotta Seminary. The archdeacon replied that he had the canonical right to administer the Angamaly Archdiocese, even without Menezes' approval. He later convoked a synod of priests in Angamaly, in which the priests took a solemn oath that they would only recognize the Archdeacon of Angamaly as their administrator, and that they would not accept any innovations until the Chaldean Patriarch appoints a new metropolitan for them.

Angered by the resistance of the native Christians, Menezes wrote to the Archdeacon that he intends to a visit Malabar and that the Profession of Faith he had instructed earlier should be implemented immediately. The archdeacon replied that he would perform it before any other religious order other than the Jesuits, considering his dispute with them. Menezis allowed him to make the Profession of Faith before the Franciscans in Cochin. The Archdeacon made the profession of faith privately in front of the Franciscans because he felt that making it in public was humiliating for him and would make him appear non-Catholic until then. But this did not satisfy Menezis and he asked the archdeacon to publicly make the profession of faith again. Therefore the archdeacon made a public profession of faith in the Franciscan Church of Vypin, in front of the representatives of all the religious orders, except the Jesuits, and the civil authorities of Cochin were also present there. The Dominicans testified that they were completely satisfied with the archdeacon's profession of faith. But the Jesuits did not end their hostility towards the archdeacon. They demanded that the ceremony be declared invalid, arguing that many parts of the ceremony were conducted in Portuguese, a language the archdeacon did not know.

Menezes undertook a visit to all the churches of the Saint Thomas Christians in February 1599, which lasted for a few months and slowly earned the good will of the people. After having won over a considerable number of people and priests, Menezes threatened to depose Archdeacon Givargis and appoint in his place Thomas Kurian, another nephew of the former Archdeacon whose claims had been ignored in 1593. In order to prevent a division, Archdeacon Givargis (of the Cross) yielded to the demands of Menezes.

=== Menezis' convocation of the Synod ===
Menezis then resorted to convene a diocesan synod to suppress the jurisdiction of Chaldean patriarch in Malabar and to formally bring the Saint Thomas Christians under the Portuguese Padroado. Although the archdeacon assured him of his cooperation in this, Menezis decided to avoid Angamaly, which was the episcopal see, as it was a native Christian stronghold where the archdeacon was more influential. Hence, he selected Udayamperoor (Diamper), a town with a larger Southist presence located within the realms of the Kingdom of Cochin, who was an ally of the Portuguese. There, he promulgated his pre-determined canons by consolidating support from those whom he offered ordinations and bribes during his visit. The archdeacon reluctantly offered his submission and agreed to terminate the hierarchical relationship with the Chaldean patriarchate. Menezis recognised the archdeacon as the governor of the 'diocese of Angamaly', the newly formed suffragan diocese of the Goan Padroado archdiocese created by Menezis' synod to replace the Chaldean archdiocese, for the time being until the appointment of a new prelate.

== Under Francisco Roz (1600-1624) ==
After the return of Menezis to Goa, Francisco Roz and Giovanni Campori visited many of the churches left out by Menezis and the archdeacon was forced to accompany them. Roz indulged into the correction and destruction of orthodox East Syriac manuscripts under the possession of the parishes. Roz was appointed as the first bishop of the newly formed suffragan diocese of Angamaly. Being a Syriac scholar and highly experienced in working among the Christians of Malabar, Roz managed to secure his position among the Christians during their intense dissatisfaction against Menezis' Synod of Diamper by declaring it a false synod and by appealing for the restoration of the metropolitan status for the diocese. With the concurrence of the archdeacon in 1603, Roz convened a new synod in Angamaly, which enacted a revised form of the Syro-Malabaric liturgy and a new set of diocesan statutes, thereby replacing those of the Synod of Diamper. However Roz's tendency to centralize power unto himself frequently brought him at odds with the archdeacon.

=== Conflict with Roz ===
By 1604, Roz had shifted the diocesan headquarters from Angamaly to Cranganore, causing distaste in the archdeacon. This and his subsequent actions based in Cranganore also triggered his disputes with the Diocese of Cochin and the Franciscans. The publication of the Jornada of Menezis which attributed the Saint Thomas Christians of heresy intensified the dissatisfaction among the native Christians. Meanwhile, the archdeacon renewed strong ties with the Franciscans, who were at odds with the Jesuits.

In 1609, the dispute between Roz and the archdeacon turned into an open explosion. The archdeacon welcomed a West Asian whom he hailed as a bishop sent by the Chaldean patriarch. After eight months of stay, he returned to his homeland in Armenia with the help of the archdeacon. Roz responded by excommunicating the archdeacon and his supporters. The archdeacon, however, maintained strong adherence from the majority of the Christians and was supported by the political and ecclesiastical authorities in Cochin and the Franciscans. Meanwhile, Roz appointed a new archdeacon to invest him with the Pallium that was granted as the metropolitan status of the diocese was restored. The new archdeacon was from Kaduthuruthy and is said to be one of Giwargis' own uncles. By 1615, Roz and Giwargis had temporarily sorted out their problems only to be resumed by 1618. Roz started disregarding the archdeacon and the archdeacon responded by banning Jesuits from entering the churches under him. Estevao Brito and Giacomo Fenicio favoured the archdeacon while Campori tried to make the disputes even worse. Roz died in 1624 without having solved the disputes with the archdeacon. Following this, the archdeacon took over the administration of the archdiocese along with the Jesuit Antoney Toscano as per the will left by Roz himself.

== Under Estevao Brito (1624 - 1637) ==
=== Accommodation with Brito ===
Estevao Brito was appointed archbishop of Cranganore in 1624. His relationship with the archdeacon was already very cordial. Brito was solemnly received and accepted by the archdeacon. The Portuguese king, on Brito's recommendation, had bestowed the Order of Christ on the archdeacon, but he refused to accept it fearing that such Portuguese innovations may degrade his traditional status and rights. The archdeacon collaborated with Brito in governance. Brito founded th Recollects of Saint Thomas the Apostle, a religious order for the native Christian priests, centred in Edappally (Rapolim).

=== Renewed conflicts with Jesuits ===
Meanwhile, the relationship between the archdeacon and the Jesuits continued to deteriorate. The Jesuits claimed monopoly over the Saint Thomas Christians and opposed the presence of other religious orders. Meanwhile, the archdeacon welcomed the Dominicans led by Francisco Donati, who established a seminary in Kaduthuruthy for the natives. The archdeacon also reached out to the Augustinians to request the Portuguese King to allow non-Jesuit missionaries in Malabar and to confirm the Recollects. Brito was heavily displeased by these actions of the archdeacon. In 1633, the pope permitted all religious orders to work in India. But this approval was not accepted by the Portuguese authorities. The Jesuits feared that the archdeacon could oust them from Malabar if the native Recollects obtain papal confirmation. Being instigated by the Jesuits, Brito planned to dissolve the Recollects and prevented new members from joining it. He also attempted to excommunicate those who joined the Recollects without his permission. In 1633, he amended the rules of the Recollects to make it less appear like a religious congregation, contrary to what he initially intended it to be.

=== Conflict and settlement with Brito ===
The Recollects, led by the archdeacon, protested against the Jesuits and tried to resolve the issue in Brito's audience, which he refused. This led to an open conflict between the archdeacon and Brito. The archdeacon reciprocated by forbidding Jesuits from entering native churches and preventing the sending of candidates to the Vaipicotta Seminary, and refused to recognise the appointments made by Brito without his concurrence. The following week, Britto reached an agreement with the archdeacon and acknowledged his rights in document. By then, the Portuguese Viceroy had instructed the captain in Cochin to capture and kill the archdeacon if requested by Brito. The captain bribed the King of Cochin and tried to seize the document issued by Brito to the archdeacon. The King of Cochin ordered the archdeacon to produce the document, but the archdeacon submitted a copy instead of the original. Meanwhile, the archdeacon assigned Manoel Popolo to communicate directly with the Portuguese king. The Portuguese king limited Brito's powers in response to the archdeacon's complaints. Meanwhile, the Jesuits had already managed to get Francisco Garcia Mendes as Brito's coadjutor and future successor. Following these developments, the archbishop and the archdeacon finally reconciled by 1635.

== Death ==
There are two versions regarding the death of Archdeacon Giwargis of the Cross. The first is that he died in 1637 and was buried at his ancestral home in Kuravilangad. He was then immediately succeeded by his nephew, Parambil Thoma. The second, supported by a Syriac epitaph in the Angamaly Cheriyapalli Church, says that he died on 25 July 1640 and was buried in the Cheriyapalli, the seat of the archdeaconate, in Angamaly.

== See also ==
- India (East Syriac Ecclesiastical Province)
- Saint Thomas Christians
- Christianity in India
- Church of the East
- Mar Abraham
- Alangad
- Geevarghese of Christ
