= Pataca =

A pataca (or patacão) is a unit of currency, and an avo is 1/100 of a pataca. Pataca is the Portuguese name for peso, the word itself is first attested in 1548 as a gold coin worth a cruzado. The following articles contain more information (list may not contain all historical patacas):

- Macanese pataca
- Maltese pataca
- Portuguese Timorese pataca
