= Latin Patriarchate of Ethiopia =

Catholic jurisdiction in Ethiopia (1555–1663)

The Latin Patriarchate of Ethiopia was a Latin patriarchal see of the Catholic Church in Ethiopia from 1555 to 1663.

The archbishopric was held primarily by Portuguese bishops and all members of the Society of Jesus.

== List of Latin Patriarchs of Ethiopia ==
- Uncanonical: João Bermudes (1536? – 1545?; died 1570)
- João Nunes Barreto, S.J. (1555.01 – retired 1557)
- Andrés de Oviedo, S.J. (Spanish; 1562.12.22 – death 1577.06.29), succeeding as former Coadjutor Archbishop of Ethiopia (Ethiopia) (1555.01.23 – 1562.12.22) & Titular Archbishop of Hierapolis in Syria of the Syrians (1555.01.23 – 1577.06.29)
- Melchior Carneiro (賈耐勞), S.J. (1577 – retired 1581), previously Titular Archbishop of Nicæa (1555.01.23 – 1577) & Auxiliary Bishop of Ethiopia (Ethiopia) (1555.01.23 – 1577); also Apostolic Administrator of Macau 澳門 (Macau, Portuguese China) (1576.01.23 – 1581)
- Afonso Mendes, S.J. (1622.12.19 – retired 1636)

== Non-succeeding Coadjutor-Archbishops of Ethiopia ==
All were Jesuits, survived by the incumbent Patriarchs.

- Didacus Secco, S.J. (1622.12.19 – death 1623.07), Titular Archbishop of Nicæa (1622.12.19 – 1623.07)
- João da Rocha, S.J. (1623.03.06 – death 1639.07.20), Titular Archbishop of Hierapolis and Auxiliary Bishop of Goa (1623.03.06 – 1627?)
- Apollinaris de Almeida, S.J. (1627.03.22 – death 1638.06.15), Titular Archbishop of Nicæa (1627.03.22 – 1638.06.15)

== See also ==
- Ethiopian Orthodox Patriarch-Catholicos of Axum

== Source and External links ==
- GCatholic, with incumbent biography links
