= List of tourist attractions in Macau =

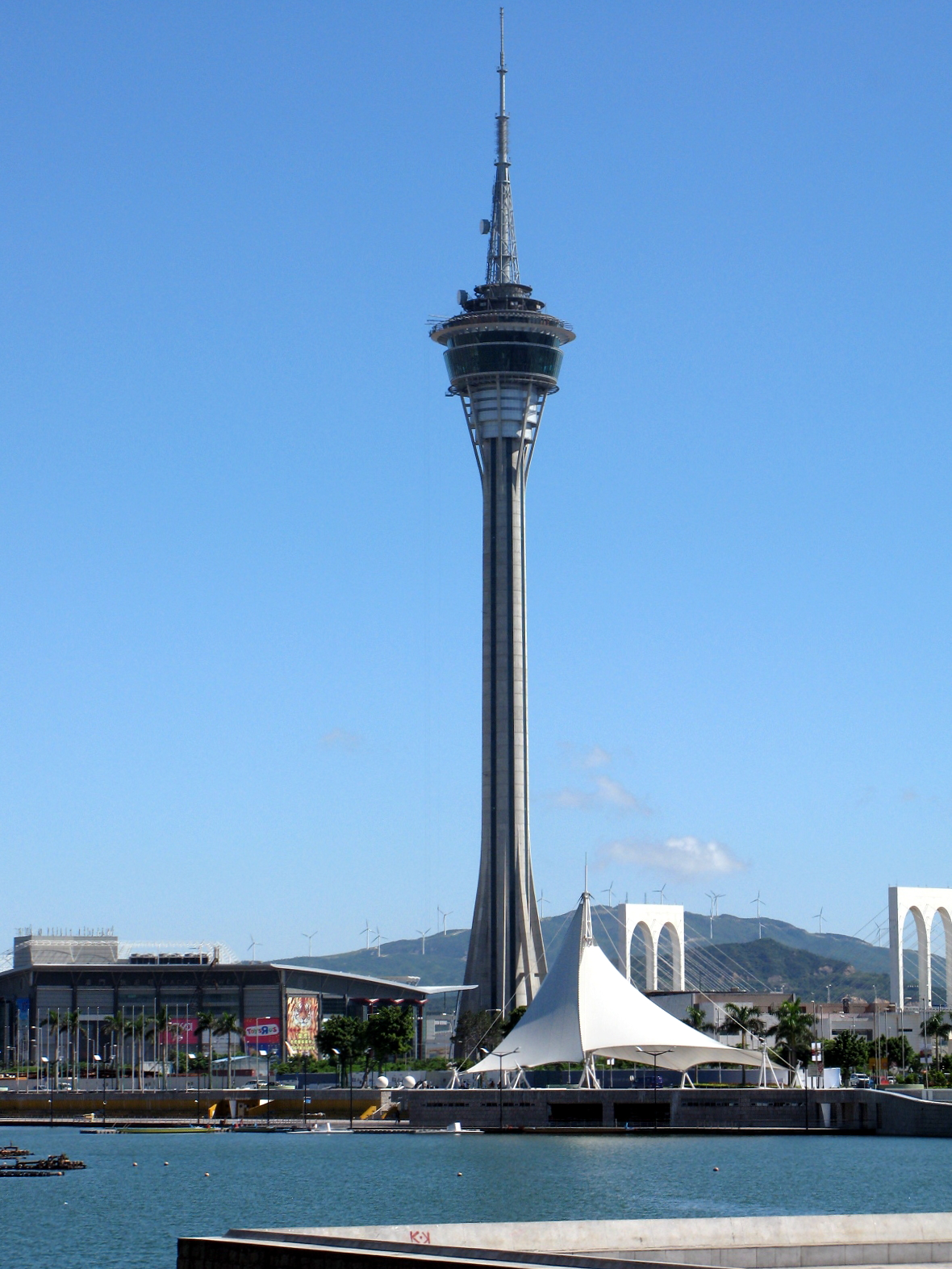
Macau Tower

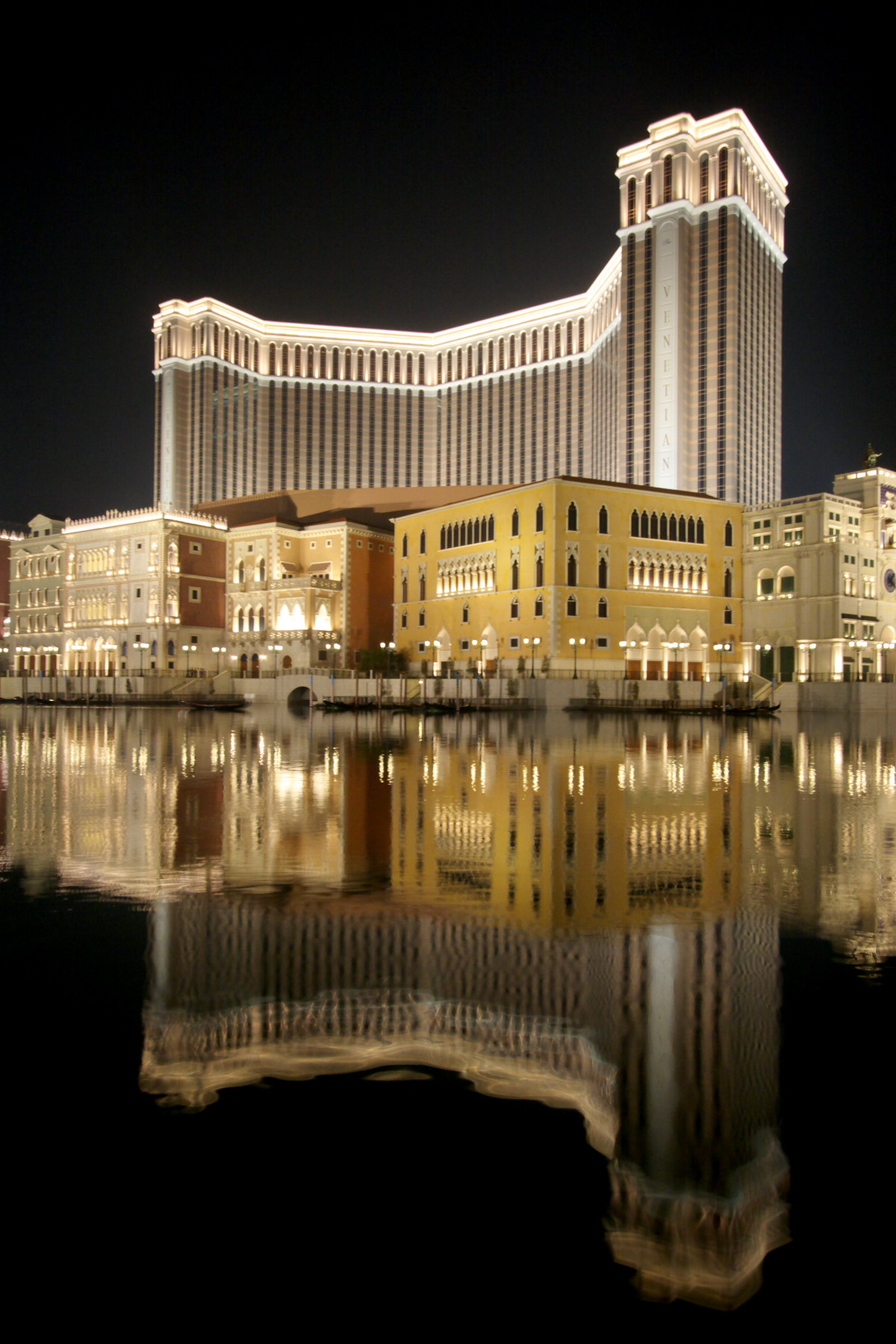
The Venetian Macao

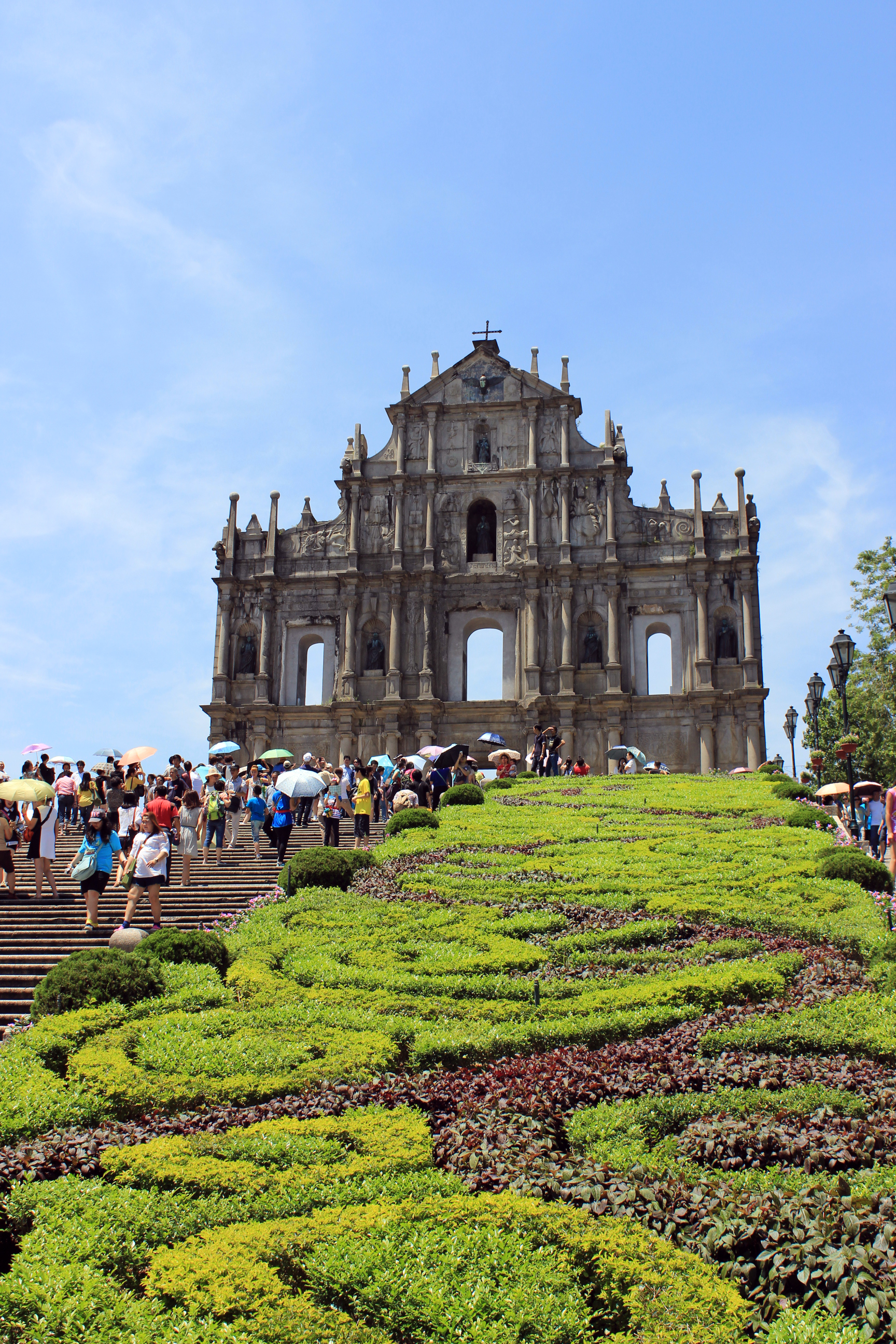
Ruins of St. Paul's

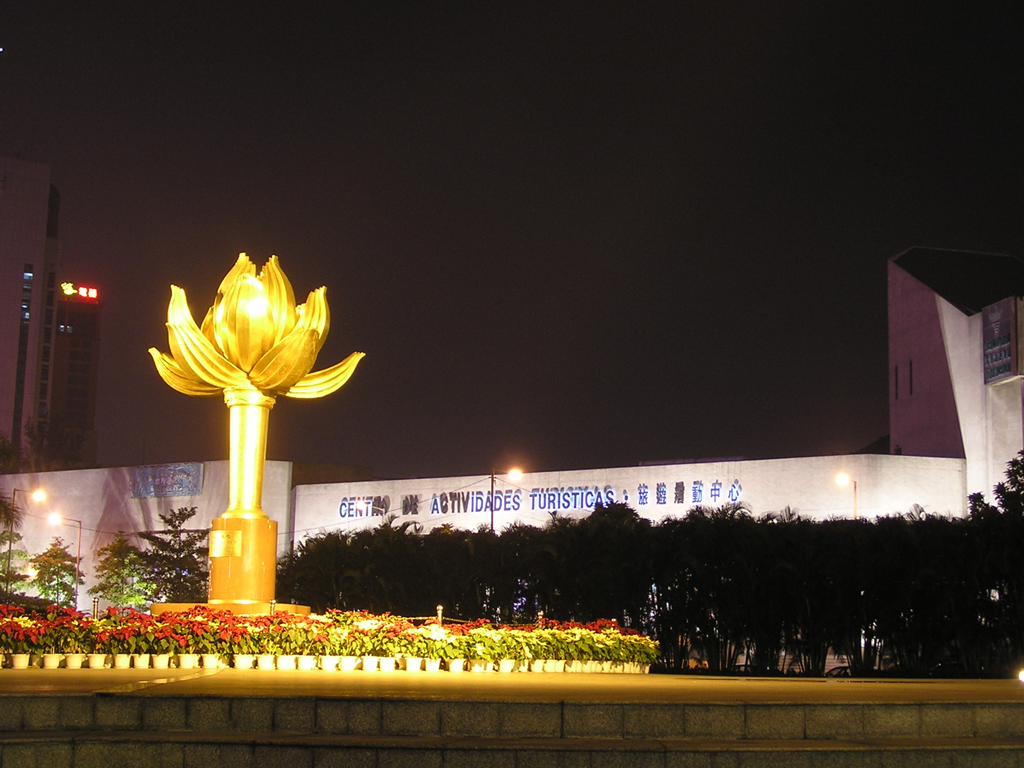
Lotus Square

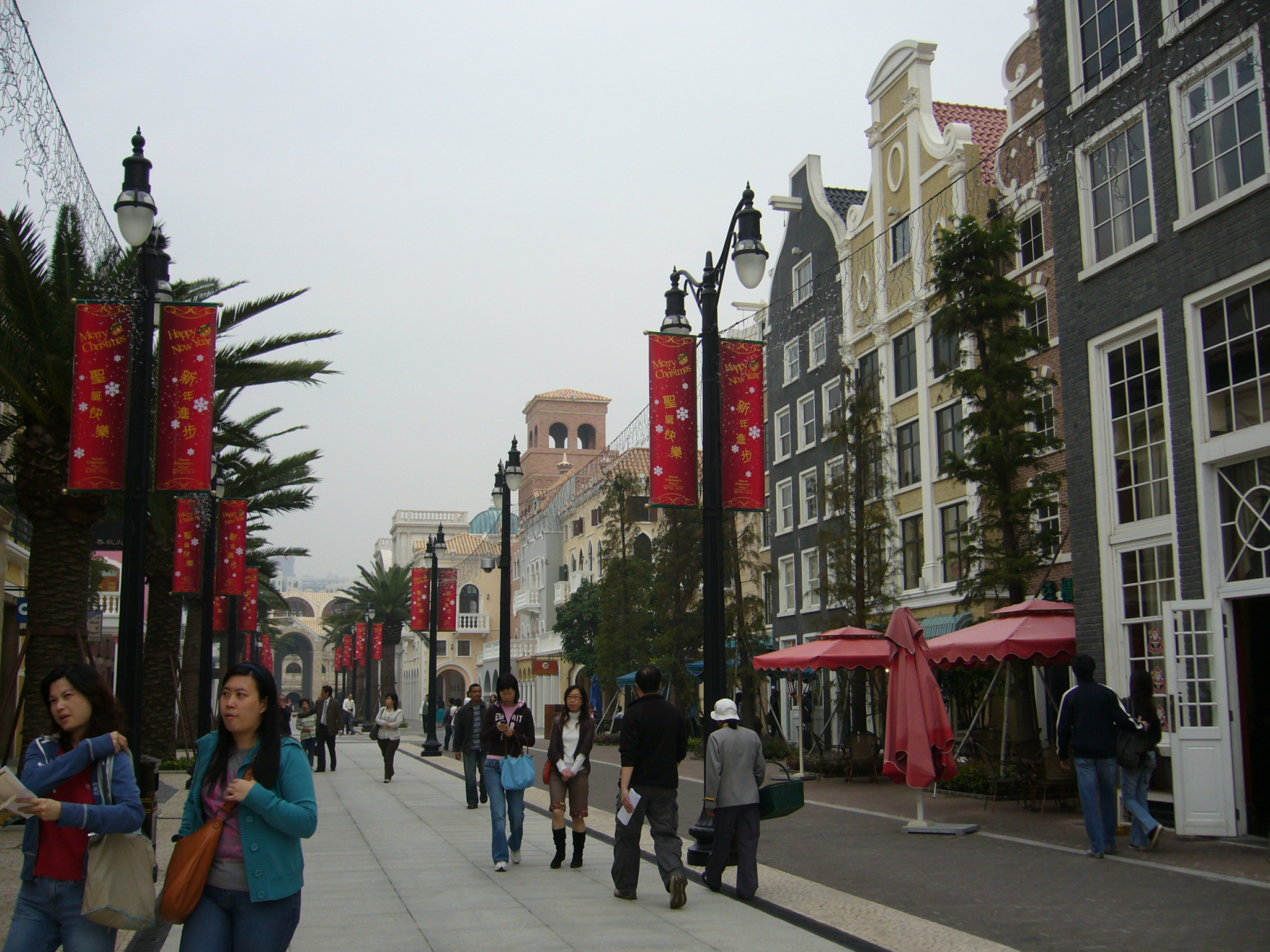
Macau Fisherman's Wharf

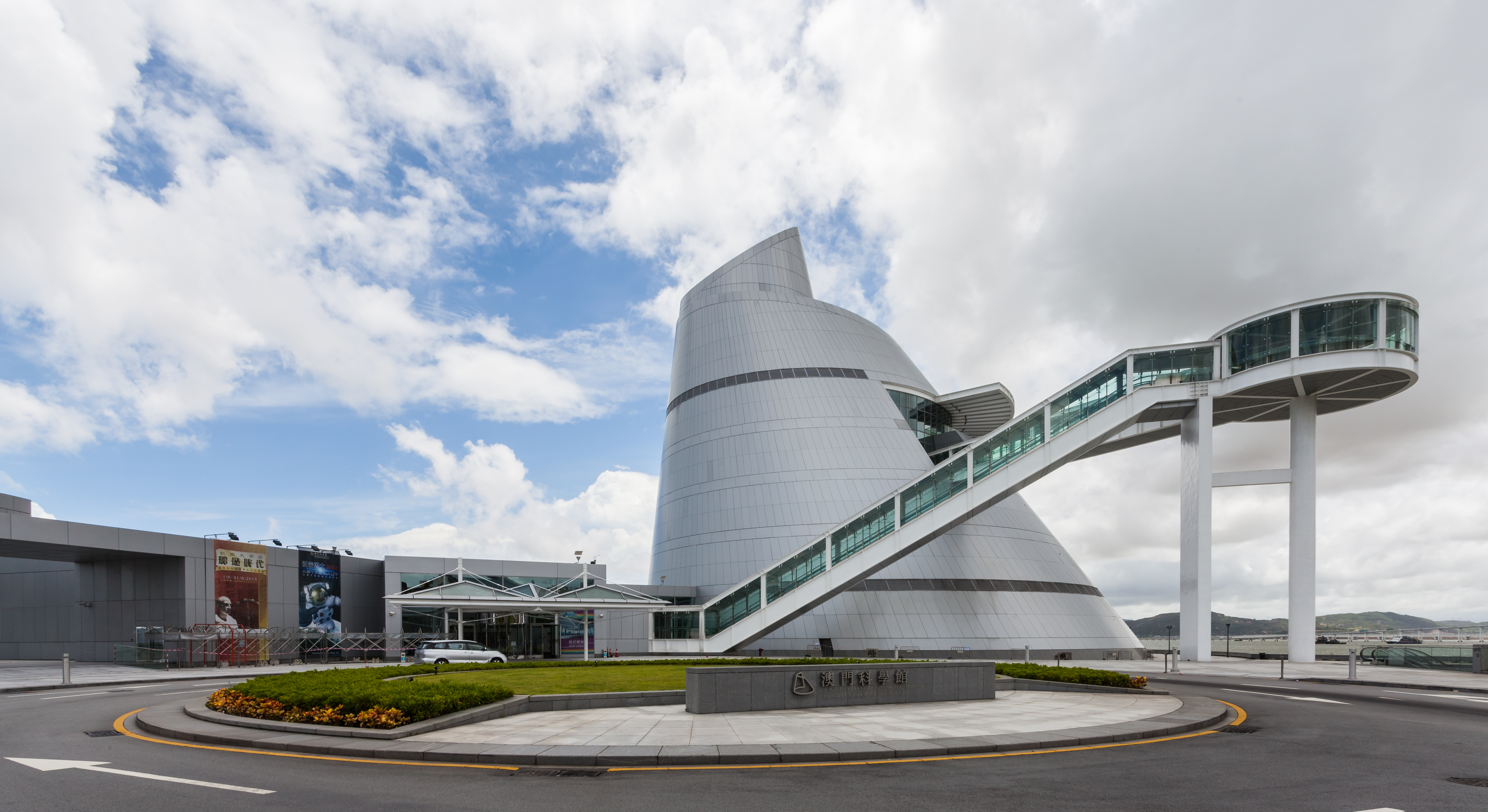
Macao Science Center

Popular tourist attractions in Macau include the following:

== Buildings and towers ==
- Macau Tower

== Casinos ==
- Altira Macau
- Casino Lisboa
- City of Dreams
- Galaxy Macau
- L'Arc Casino
- MGM Macau
- Ponte 16
- Pousada Marina Infante
- Sands Macao
- The Venetian Macao
- Wynn Macau

== Historical buildings ==
- Camões Grotto
- Dom Pedro V Theatre
- Fort Dona Maria II
- Fort São Francisco
- Fort São Tiago da Barra
- Fortaleza do Monte
- Guia Fortress
- Holy House of Mercy
- Leal Senado Building
- Lou Kau Mansion
- Macau General Post Office
- Macau Government Headquarters
- Macau Government House
- Mong-Há Fort
- Portas do Cerco
- Ruins of St. Paul's
- Santa Casa de Misericórdia
- Walls of Macau

== Libraries ==
- Archives of Macao
- Sir Robert Ho Tung Library

== Museums ==
- Communications Museum
- Grand Prix Museum
- Handover Gifts Museum of Macao
- Macau Museum of Art
- Macau Wine Museum
- Maritime Museum
- Museum of Macau
- Museum of Sacred Art and Crypt
- Museum of Taipa and Coloane History
- Sun Yat Sen Memorial House
- Taipa Houses–Museum

== Nature ==
- Hac Sa Beach
- Nam Van Lake
- Sai Van Lake

== Parks and gardens ==
- Casa Garden
- Coloane Park
- Comendador Ho Yin Garden
- Dr Carlos d'Assumpcao Park
- Montanha Russa Park
- Arts Garden
- Hac Sa Park
- Lou Lim Ieoc Garden
- Seac Pai Van Park
- Sun Yat Sen Park
- Vasco da Gama Garden
- Victory Garden

== Public squares ==
- Lotus Square
- Senado Square
- Tap Seac Square

== Religious places ==
- A-Ma Temple
- Kuan Tai Temple
- Macau Mosque and Cemetery
- Macau Protestant Chapel
- Na Tcha Temple
- Our Lady of Fátima Church
- Sé Church
- St. Dominic's Church
- St. Joseph's Seminary and Church
- St. Lazarus' Church

== Science centers ==
- Macao Science Center

== Shopping centers ==
- Red Market (building)

== Sport centers ==
- Caesars Golf Macau
- Macau East Asian Games Dome
- Macau Olympic Aquatic Centre
- Macau University of Science and Technology Sports Field
- Tap Seac Multi-sports Pavilion

== Theme parks ==
- Macau Fisherman's Wharf
- Macao Giant Panda Pavilion

== Others ==
- Macau Design Centre

== Transportation ==
- Cable Guia
- Macau International Airport
- Outer Harbour Ferry Terminal

== See also ==
- Tourism in Macau
