= Comendador =

Comendador is a title of Portuguese and Spanish origin, given to a person responsible for a comenda (Portuguese) or encomienda (Spanish).

Comendador may also refer to:

- Comendador, Dominican Republic, the capital of Elías Piña province
- Comendador Gomes, a municipality in Minas Gerais, Brazil
- Comendador Ho Yin Garden, a garden in Sé, Macau, China
- Comendador Levy Gasparian, a municipality in Rio de Janeiro, Brazil
