= Arts Garden =

Floral garden in Sé, Macau

Coordinates: 22°11′25.6″N 113°32′55.6″E

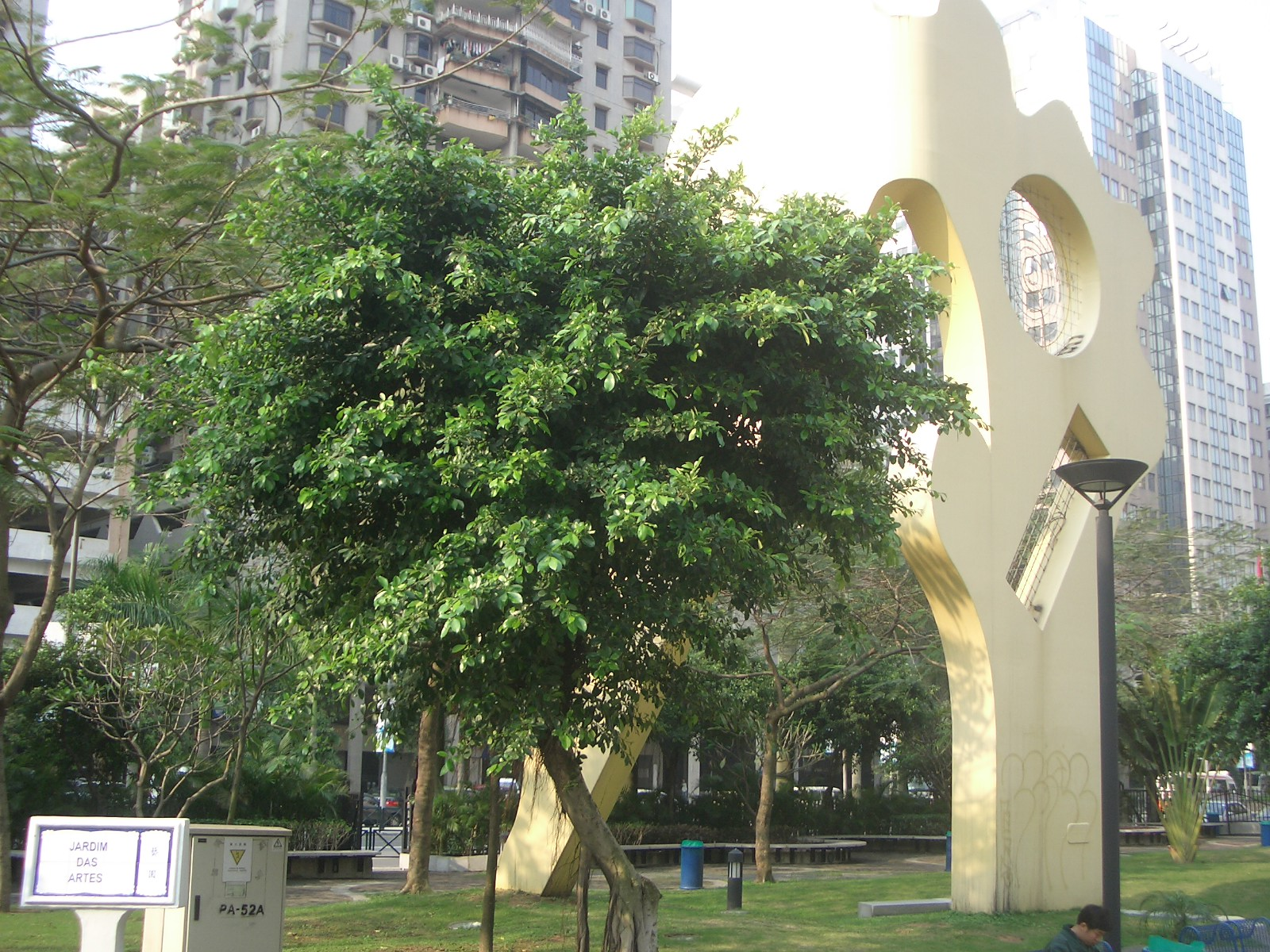
- Arts Garden

Chinese name
- Traditional Chinese: 藝園
- Simplified Chinese: 艺园
Transcriptions
Standard Mandarin
- Hanyu Pinyin: Yì Yuán
Yue: Cantonese
- Jyutping: ngai6 jyun4*2

Portuguese name
- Portuguese: Jardim das Artes

Arts Garden (Chinese: 藝園; Portuguese: Jardim das Artes) is a floral garden in Sé, Macau. It runs along Avenida de Amizade and bisects two other parks, Comendador Ho Yin Garden and Dr Carlos d'Assumpcao Park. The park features floral gardens, fountains and statuary.

== See also ==
- List of tourist attractions in Macau
