= Nossa Senhora de Fátima, Macau =

Nossa Senhora de Fátima 花地瑪堂區 Our Lady of Fátima
- Freguesia
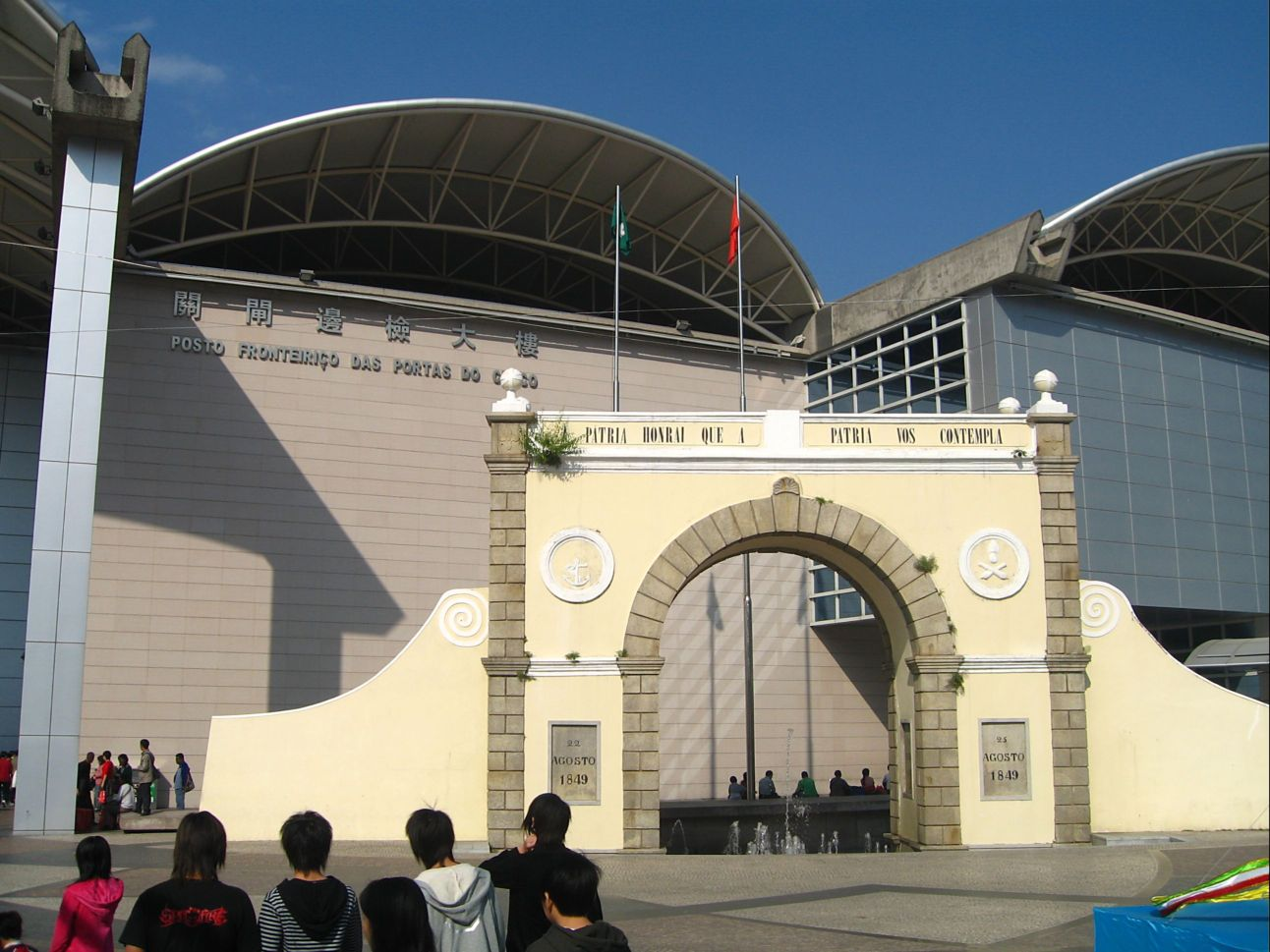
- The old Portas do Cerco

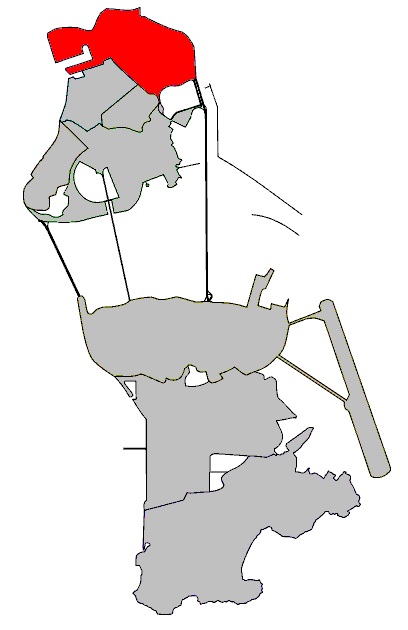
- Freguesia de Nossa Senhora de Fátima in Macau
- Sovereign State: China
- Region/SAR: Macau

Area
  - Total: 3.2 km^{2} (1.2 sq mi)

Population (2013)
  - Total: 237,500
  - Density: 74,000/km^{2} (190,000/sq mi)
- Time zone: UTC+8 (Macau Standard)
- Area code: 0

Freguesia de Nossa Senhora de Fátima

Chinese name
- Traditional Chinese: 花地瑪堂區
- Simplified Chinese: 花地玛堂区
- Jyutping: Faa^{1} Dei^{6} Maa^{5} Tong^{4} Keoi^{1}
- Hanyu Pinyin: Huādìmǎ Tángqū
Transcriptions
Standard Mandarin
- Hanyu Pinyin: Huādìmǎ Tángqū
- Yale Romanization: Hwādìmǎ Tángchyū
- IPA: [xwátîmà tʰǎŋtɕʰý]
Yue: Cantonese
- Yale Romanization: Fáadeihmáah Tòngkeú
- Jyutping: Faa^{1} Dei^{6} Maa^{5} Tong^{4} Keoi^{1}
- IPA: [fáːtéima̬ː tʰɔ̏ːŋkʰœ́ː]

Portuguese name
- Portuguese: Freguesia de Nossa Senhora de Fátima []

Nossa Senhora de Fátima is the northernmost and largest civil parish in the Macau Peninsula of Macau. It has an area of 3.2 square kilometers (1.2 sq mi) and a population of 126,000, which constitutes about 40.3% of the peninsula's landmass and one-third of the population. It is named after Our Lady of Fátima.

This parish was one of five in the former Municipality of Macau, one of Macau's two municipalities that were abolished on 31 December 2001 by Law No. 17/2001, following the 1999 transfer of sovereignty over Macau from Portugal to China. While their administrative functions have since been removed, these parishes are still retained nominally.

It is northeast of the parishes of Santo António and São Lázaro. It borders the Chinese city of Zhuhai to the north.

== Description ==
The parish consists mostly of land reclaimed from the sea. Natural land comprises only a quarter of its current size. It was developed from farmlands in the 1960s and 1970s, to become an industrial area. Forty-one percent of Macau's factories are located in the parish.

== Places and attractions ==
The following places and attractions are in the parish

- Ilha Verde (青洲, "Green Island")
- Toi San (台山)
- Hipódromo ("Hippodrome", 馬場)
- Areia Preta ("Black Sand", 黑沙環 "Black-sand Ring")
- Mong Ha (望廈 "View Amoy"), where the Treaty of Wanghia was signed
- Bairro "Fai Chi Kei" (筷子基 "Chopsticks Base")
- Iao Hon (祐漢 "Blessing the Han")

== Infrastructure ==
- Macau Power Station

== Healthcare ==
The Macau government operates the Centro de Saúde Areia Preta (黑沙環衛生中心) in Areia Preta (Hac Sa Wan).

== Tourist attractions ==
- Canidrome
- Communications Museum
- Garden of Montanha Russa
- Kun Iam Temple
- Lin Zexu Memorial Museum of Macau
- Macau Design Centre
- Macau Mosque and Cemetery
- Mong-Há Fort
- Portas do Cerco
- Sun Yat Sen Park
- Museum of Xian Xinghai

== Education ==
=== Primary and secondary schools ===
Public schools

- Zheng Guanying Official School - Preschool through secondary
- Escola Luso-Chinesa Técnico-Profissional (中葡職業技術學校) - Secondary school
- Escola Primária Luso-Chinesa do Bairro Norte (北區中葡小學)
  - It opened on 1 November 1990.
- Jardim de Infância Luso-Chinês "Girassol" (樂富中葡幼稚園)

- It occupies a 260 student-capacity, 1,042-square-metre (11,220 sq ft) area on two floors of the Edifício U Wa (裕華大廈). It opened in the Edifício “Lok Fu San Chun” on 27 March 1989 and moved to its current location in September 1997.

Tuition-free private schools

- Colégio Dom Bosco (Yuet Wah) (鮑思高粵華小學) - Preschool and primary school
  - The current school building opened in 1963, and Yuet Wah College merged into it in 2000. The school has English and Chinese sections; its Portuguese section closed in 1999.
- Macau Baptist College (MBC; Escola Cham Son de Macau; 澳門浸信中學) - Preschool through secondary school
  - Previously its secondary campus was located in a different area of Nossa Senhora de Fátima, respectively
- Escola Chong Tak de Macau (澳門中德學校) - Preschool and primary school
- Escola Fukien (澳門福建學校) - Preschool and primary school
- Hou Kong Middle School Macau (Escola Hou Kong; 濠江中學) main campus, which houses secondary school
- Escola Hói Fai (海暉學校) - Preschool and primary school
- Escola Ilha Verde da Associação Comercial de Macau (歡迎光臨青洲小學) - Preschool and primary school
- Keang Peng School (Escola Keang Peng) - Preschool through secondary school
- Kwong Tai (Guang Da) Middle School, main campus. - Preschool to secondary school
- Escola Lin Fong Pou Chai (蓮峰普濟學校) - Preschool and primary school
- Escola Madalena de Canossa (瑪大肋納嘉諾撒學校) - Preschool and primary school
- Our Lady of Fatima Girls' School (Escola Nossa Senhora de Fátima; 化地瑪聖母女子學校) - Preschool through secondary school
- Escola São Paulo (澳門聖保祿學校) - Preschool through secondary school
- Escola Secundária Técnico-Profissional da Associação Geral dos Operários de Macau (澳門工聯職業技術中學) - Has both junior high (Ensino secundário-geral/初中教育) and senior high (Ensino secundário-complementar/高中教育) levels
- Escola Tak Meng (德明學校) - Preschool and primary school - Located on the first floor of the Edifício Lok Fu San Chun (樂富新村)
- Fu Luen School (Escola da Associação Geral das Mulheres de Macau; 澳門婦聯學校) - Preschool and primary school
- Escola da Associação para Filhos e Irmãos dos Agricultores or Escola Choi Nong Chi Tai (菜農子弟學校 "Choi Nong Chi Tai Hoc Hau") - Preschool through secondary school
- Escola de Santa Teresa do Menino Jesus (聖德蘭學校) - Preschool and primary school
- Escola dos Moradores de Macau (澳門坊眾學校) - Preschool through senior high
- Jardim Infantil da Cáritas (明愛幼稚園) - Preschool - Located in Edf. Kam Hoi San Garden (金海山花園)
- Sheng Kung Hui Choi Kou School Macau (Sheng Kung Hui Escola Choi Kou (Macau); 聖公會(澳門)蔡高中學) primary school and day secondary school campus

Non-free private schools

- Colégio Diocesano de São José 5 - Preschool through secondary school
- Xin Hua Evening Secondary School (Escola Secundária Nocturna Xin Hua/新華夜中學)
- Escola Seong Fan (商訓夜中學), an evening secondary school

=== Colleges and universities ===
University of Saint Joseph has its main campus in Ilha Verde, Nossa Senhora de Fátima. It moved into this campus in September 2017.

=== Public libraries ===
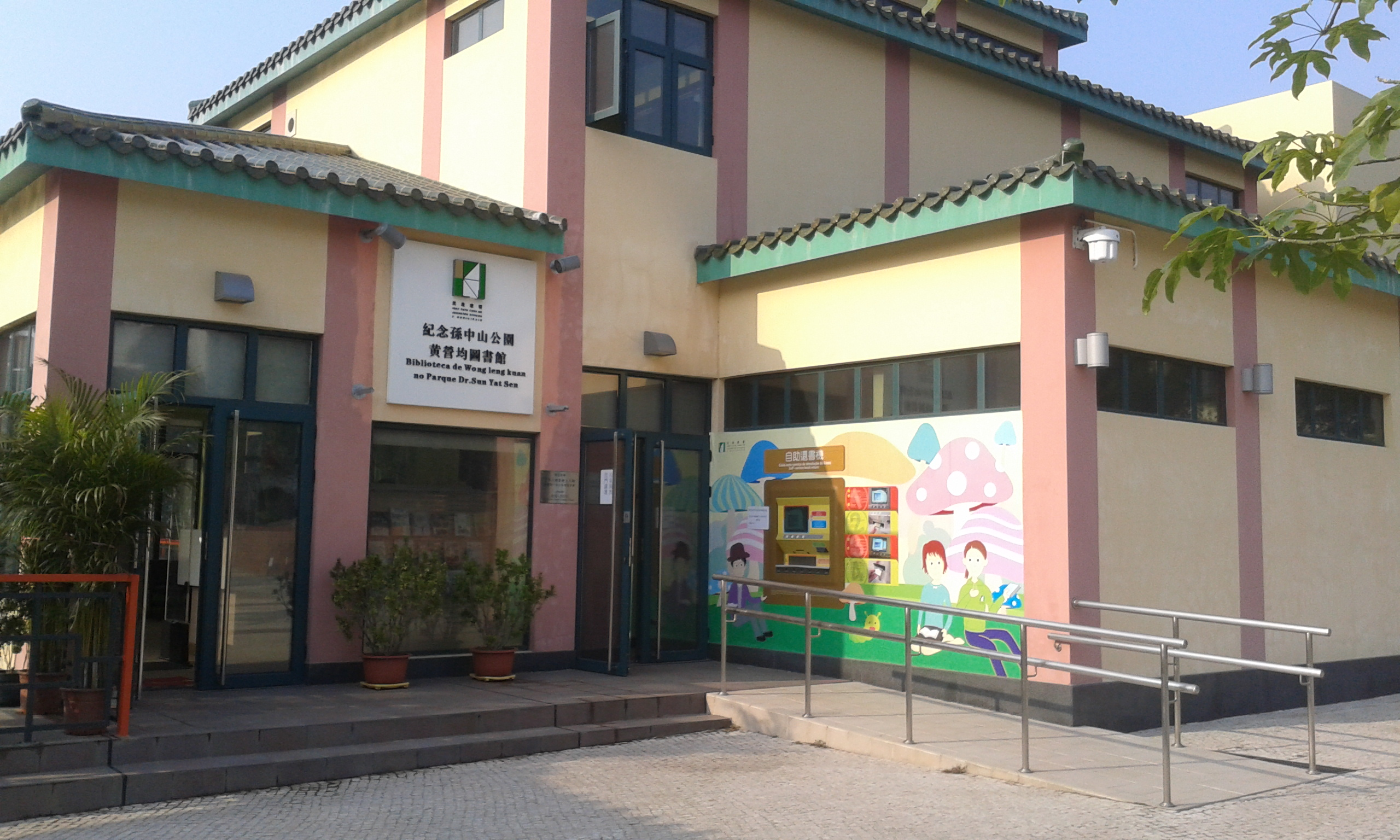
Wong Ieng Kuan Library in Dr. Sun Yat-Sen Municipal Park

Macao Public Library operates five branches in the parish:

- Ilha Verde Library (Biblioteca da Ilha Verde; 青洲圖書館)
  - The library, which opened in 1995, occupies 482 square metres (5,190 sq ft) of space on the fourth floor of the Edf. May Fair Garden (美居廣場).
- Mong Há Library (Biblioteca de Mong Há; 望廈圖書館)
  - It occupies 360 square metres (3,900 sq ft) of space on the third floor of the Edifício Mong Sin (望善樓) in the Habitação Social de Mong Há (望廈社屋). It first occupied a three storey building in the Bairro Social de Mong-Há (望廈新邨) upon opening in 1988; this location closed in April 2011 and it reopened in its current location in December 2011.
- Wong Ieng Kuan Library in Areia Preta Urban Park (Biblioteca de Wong Ieng Kuan no Jardim da Areia Preta; 黑沙環公園黃營均圖書館)
  - One of several parks funded by Chinese Peruvian Wong Ieng Kuan (黃營均), it has an area with 200 square metres (2,200 sq ft) of space. Its opening occurred in 2004.
- Wong Ieng Kuan Children's Library in Areia Preta Urban Park (Biblioteca Infantil Wong Ieng Kuan no Jardim da Areia Preta; 黑沙環公園黃營均兒童圖書館)
  - The library occupies a space of 210 square metres (2,300 sq ft) and is directly across from the main library in the same park. It uses a theme from the Mainland Chinese television programme Pleasant Goat and Big Big Wolf. It first opened on 2 July 2011. The library, prior to receiving its current theme on 1 December 2012, originally had an Alice in Wonderland theme.
- Wong Ieng Kuan Library in Dr. Sun Yat-Sen Municipal Park (Biblioteca de Wong Ieng Kuan no Parque Dr. Sun Yat Sen; 紀念孫中山公園黃營均圖書館)
  - It occupies 459 square metres (4,940 sq ft) of space in a former restaurant in the Dr. Sun Yat-Sen Municipal Park. One of several created with funding by Dr. Wong Ieng Kuan, it opened in a separate building in the park in 1996 and moved to its current building on 24 January 2014.

== Religion ==
=== Christianity ===
- Our Lady of Fátima Church (1967)

== See also ==
- Macau Peninsula
