= Treaty of Wanghia =

1844 treaty between the United States and Qing China

Treaty of peace, amity, and commerce, between the United States of America and the Chinese Empire
- Type: Bilateral / Unequal
- Signed: July 3, 1844
- Location: Kun Iam Temple in Portuguese Macau
- Negotiators: (United States) Caleb Cushing; (Qing dynasty) Keying
- Parties: Qing dynasty; United States
- Languages: English and Chinese

Full text
- Treaty of Wanghia at Wikisource

Treaty of Wanghia
- Traditional Chinese: 望廈條約
- Simplified Chinese: 望厦条约
Transcriptions
Standard Mandarin
- Hanyu Pinyin: Wàngxià tiáoyuē
- Wade–Giles: Wang-hsia T'iao-yüeh
Yue: Cantonese
- Jyutping: mong6 haa6 tiu4 joek3

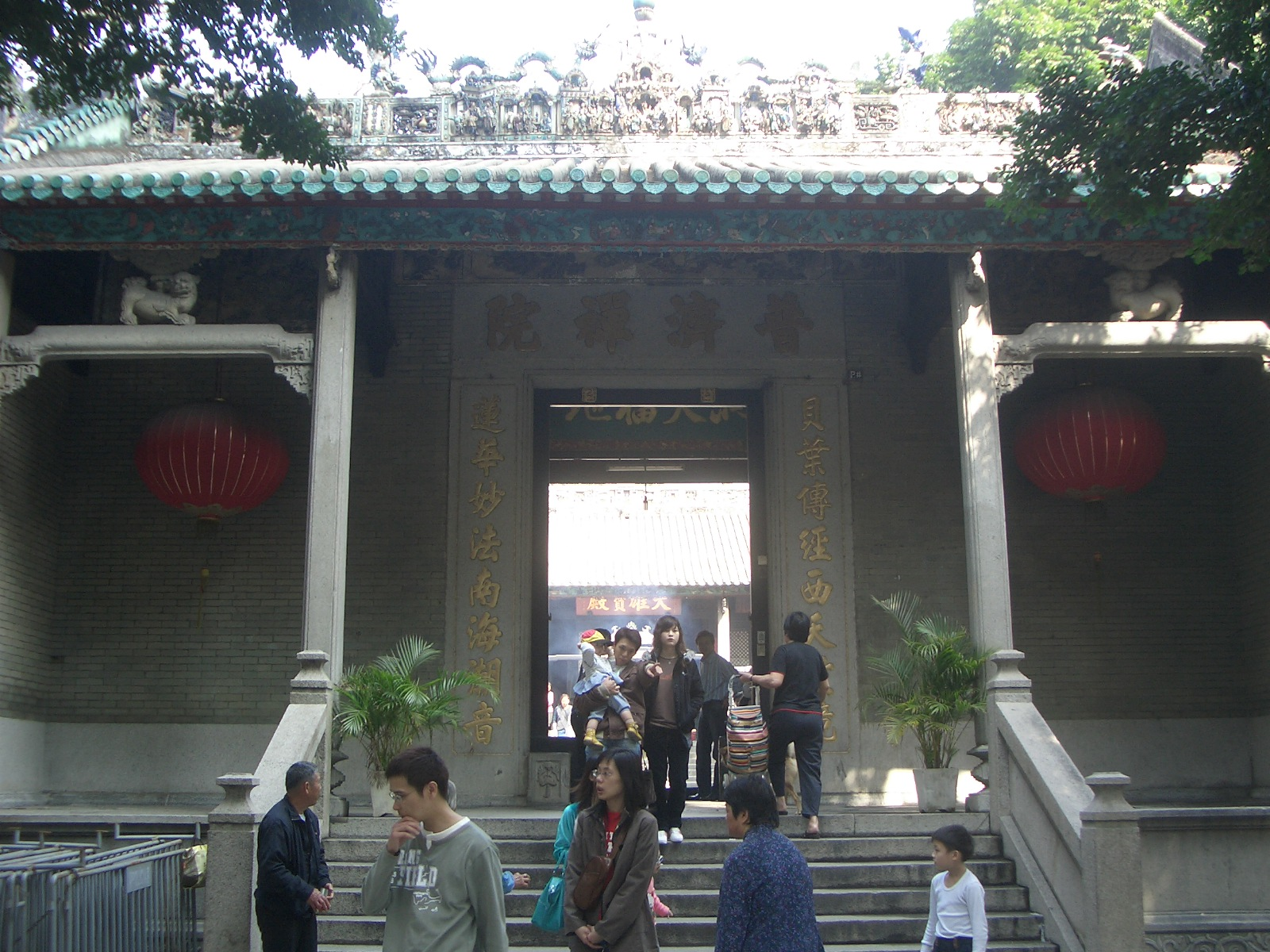
Façade of the Kun Iam Temple, where the treaty was signed.

The Treaty of Wanghia (also known as the Treaty of Wangxia; Treaty of peace, amity, and commerce, between the United States of America and the Chinese Empire); (Chinese: [中美]望廈條約 / [中美]望厦条约) was the first of the unequal treaties imposed by the United States on the Qing dynasty. By the terms of the diplomatic agreement, the United States received the same privileges with China that Great Britain had achieved under the Treaty of Nanking in 1842. The United States received additional privileges as well, including the right to cabotage on preferential terms and the expansion of extraterritoriality. Imperial China's Qing dynasty signed the treaty with the United States on July 3, 1844, in the Kun Iam Temple. The treaty was subsequently passed by the US Congress and ratified by President John Tyler on January 17, 1845. The Treaty of Wanghia was formally in effect until the signing of the 1943 Sino-American Treaty for the Relinquishment of Extraterritorial Rights in China.

== Name ==
The treaty was named after a village in northern Macau where the temple is located, called Mong Ha or Wang Hia (traditional Chinese: 望廈; simplified Chinese: 望厦; pinyin: Wàngxià; Cantonese Yale: Mohng Hah). It is now a part of the territory's Our Lady of Fátima Parish.

== Treaty contents ==
The United States was represented by Caleb Cushing, a Massachusetts lawyer dispatched by President John Tyler under pressure from American merchants concerned about British dominance in trade with China. Physician and missionary Peter Parker served as Cushing's Chinese interpreter. The Qing dynasty was represented by Keying, the Viceroy of Liangguang, who held responsibility for the provinces of Guangdong and Guangxi.

The treaty was modeled after the treaties of Nanking and the Bogue between the United Kingdom and China, but differed in being more detailed. Among other things, it contained provisions for:

- Extraterritoriality, whereby Chinese subjects would be tried and punished under Chinese law and American citizens would be tried and punished under the authority of the American consul or other public functionaries authorized to that effect
- Fixed tariffs on trade in the treaty ports
- The right to buy land in the five treaty ports and erect churches and hospitals there
- The right to learn Chinese by abolishing a law that had forbidden foreigners to do so
- Most favored nation status for the United States, resulting in the United States receiving the same beneficial treatment China gave to other Western powers and the right to modify the treaty after 12 years

The United States also granted the Chinese Empire powers to confiscate American ships operating outside treaty ports and withdrew consular protection in cases in which American citizens were trading in opium, under articles 3 and 33, respectively. Furthermore, the US agreed to hand over any offenders to China. (Americans entered the opium trade with less expensive but inferior Turkish opium and by 1810 had around 10% of the trade in Canton.)

== See also ==
- Western imperialism in Asia
- China–United States relations
