= Toi San (Macao) =

Toi San 台山
- Freguesia (parish)
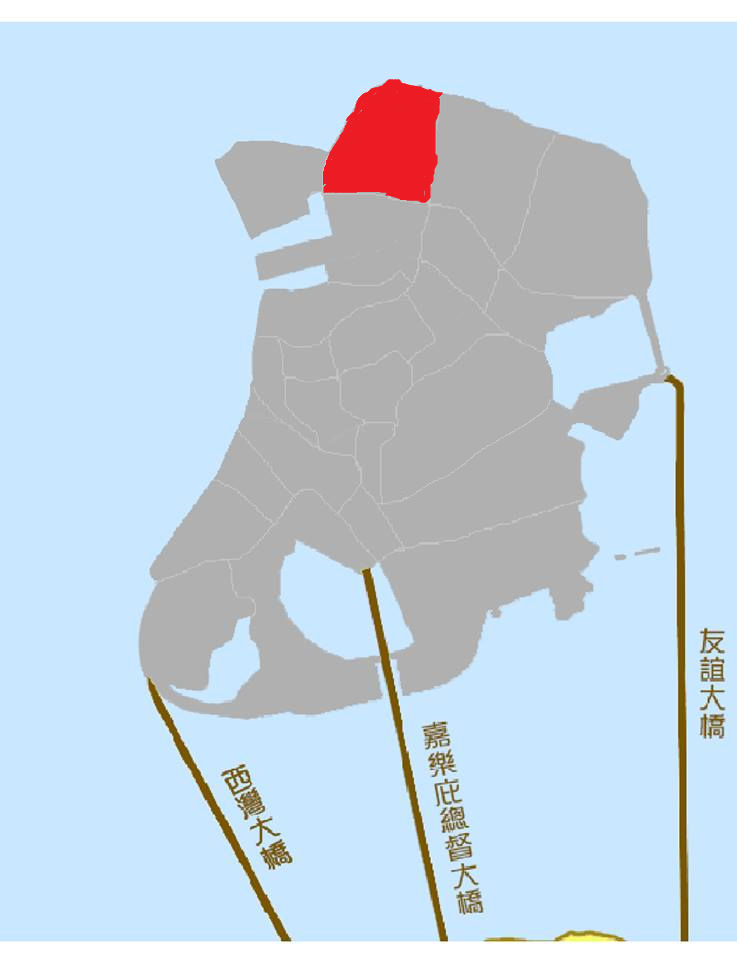
- Location of Toi San on the Macau Peninsula

- Location in Macau
- Country: Macau
- Region: Macau Peninsula
- District: Nossa Senhora de Fátima

Area
  - Total: 0.33 km^{2} (0.13 sq mi)

Population (2021)
  - Total: 31,000
  - Density: 94,000/km^{2} (240,000/sq mi)
- Time zone: UTC+8 (Macau Standard Time)
- Area code: +853
- ISO 3166 code: MO

Toi San (Chinese: 台山), also called Tamagnini Barbosa, is a dense urban district in the northern part of the Macau Peninsula, within the parish of Nossa Senhora de Fátima. It is a residential and commercial neighborhood close to the Border Gate and the Areia Preta and San Kio areas. Toi San has undergone extensive urban redevelopment since the late 20th century.

== History ==
Toi San was originally in a coastal marshland area. The region underwent a series of land reclamation projects, particularly between 1919 and 1924, to support urban expansion and industrial development. In 1925, Toi San was the site of a catastrophic fireworks factory explosion, which resulted in significant casualties and prompted changes to safety regulations concerning pyrotechnic production in Macao. The area later transitioned into a residential district, with many apartment buildings constructed in the post-war decades, especially during the 1970s and 1980s.
