= Natural and Agrarian Museum =

Museum in Coloane, Macau

- 土地暨自然博物館; Museu Natural e Agrário
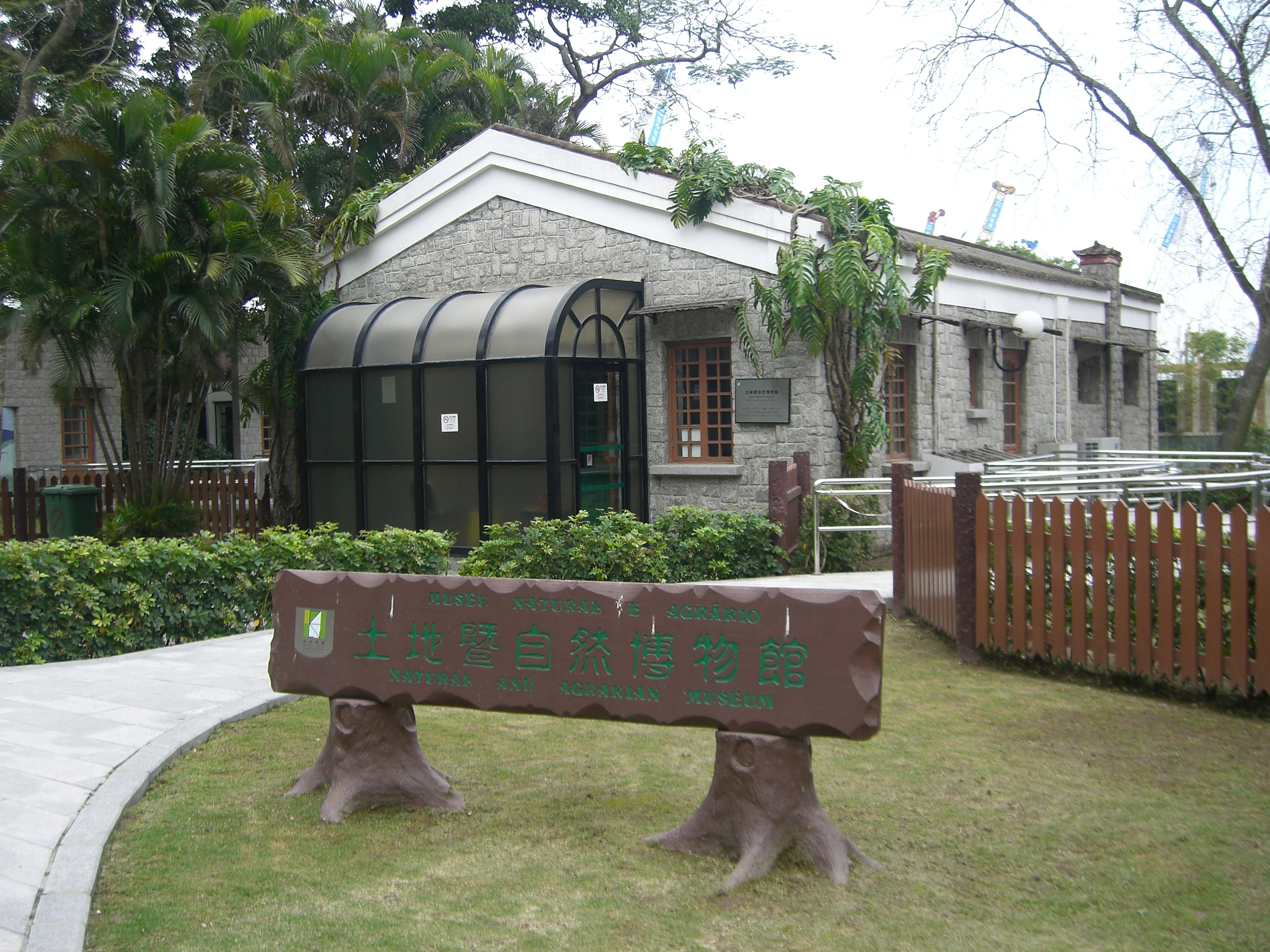
- Established: 21 March 1997
- Location: Coloane, Macau, China
- Coordinates: 22°07′33.0″N 113°33′23.5″E
- Type: museum

Natural and Agrarian Museum

Chinese name
- Traditional Chinese: 土地暨自然博物館
Transcriptions
Standard Mandarin
- Hanyu Pinyin: Tǔdì jì Zìrán Bówùguǎn
Yue: Cantonese
- Jyutping: tou2 dei6 kei3 zi6 jin4 bok3 mat6 gun2

Portuguese name
- Portuguese: Museu Natural e Agrário

The Natural and Agrarian Museum (Chinese: 土地暨自然博物館; Portuguese: Museu Natural e Agrário) is a public museum in Seac Pai Van Park, Coloane, Macau. The museum was established on 21 March 1997. The museum is housed in a wooden-style little house. It consists of five sections, which are Geography of Macau, Farming Tools of the Islands in Olden Days, Lives of Farmers, Specimens of Animals and Specimens of Plants.

== See also ==
- List of museums in Macau
