= Seac Pai Van Park =

Park in Macau, China

Coordinates: 22°7′36.8″N 113°33′31.1″E

- 石排灣郊野公園; Parque de Seac Pai Van
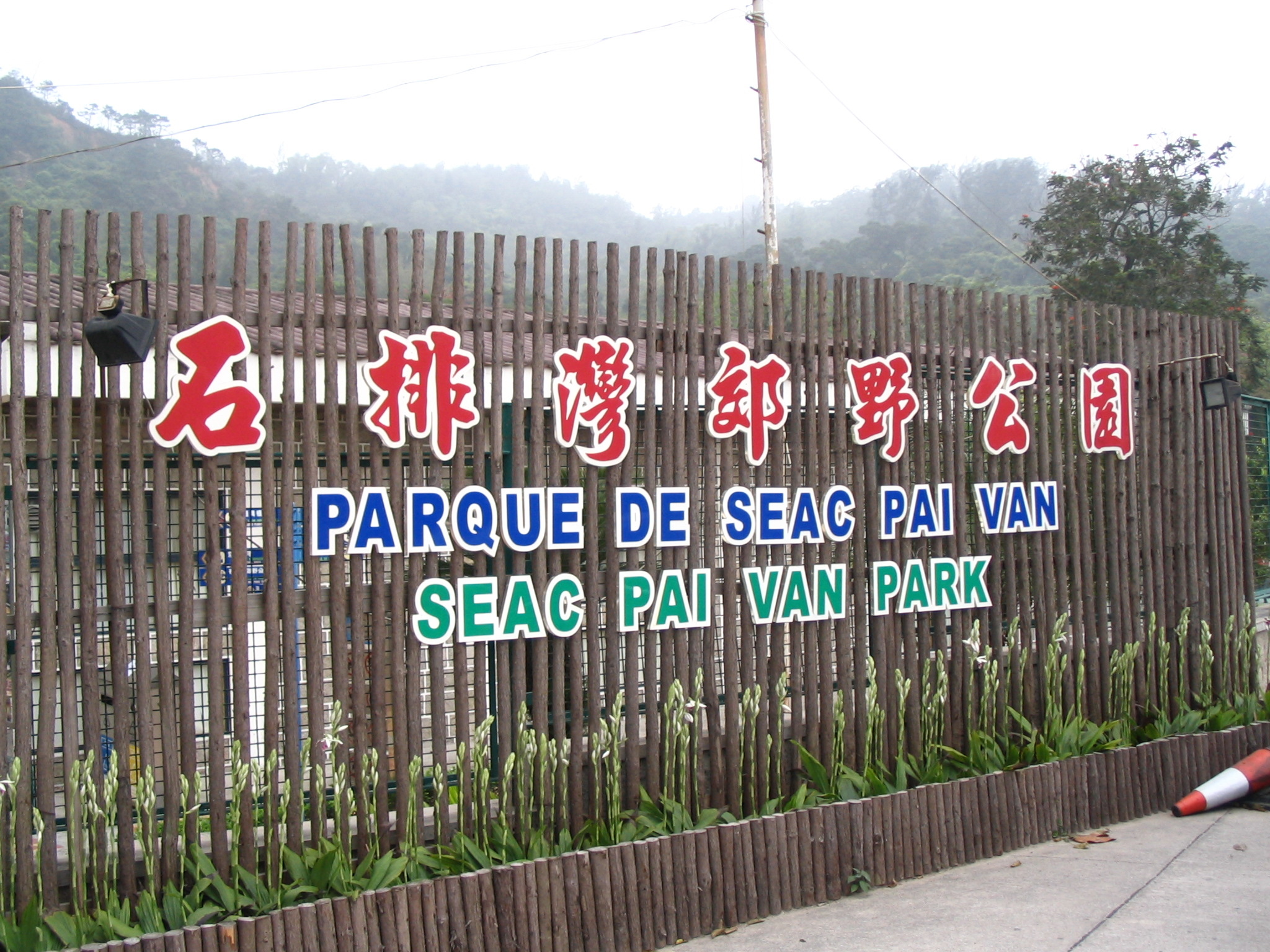
- Interactive map of Seac Pai Van Park
- Type: Park
- Location: Coloane, Macau, China
- Area: 20 hectares (49 acres)

Seac Pai Van Park

Chinese name
- Traditional Chinese: 石排灣郊野公園
- Simplified Chinese: 石排湾郊野公园
Transcriptions
Standard Mandarin
- Hanyu Pinyin: Shí Pái Wān Jiāoyě Gōngyuán
Yue: Cantonese
- Jyutping: sek6 paai4 waan1 gaau1 je5 gung1 jyun4*2

Portuguese name
- Portuguese: Parque de Seac Pai Van

The Seac Pai Van Park (Chinese: 石排灣郊野公園; Portuguese: Parque de Seac Pai Van) is a park in Coloane, Macau, China. It is the largest natural green area in Macau and is administered by the Civil and Municipal Affairs Bureau.

== History ==
The area was originally a farmland. It was then later converted into a multipurpose park. In 1981, it was listed as a protected area.

== Geology ==
The park covers an area of around 20 hectares (49 acres).

== Attractions ==
- Macao Giant Panda Pavilion
- Natural and Agrarian Museum

== See also ==
- List of tourist attractions in Macau
