= Macau Design Centre =

Art centre in Macau, China

- 澳門設計中心 (Chinese); Centro de Design Macau (Portuguese)

General information
- Type: Art center
- Location: Nossa Senhora de Fátima, Macau, China
- Opened: 15 November 2014
- Owner: Macau Designers Association

Technical details
- Floor count: 5

Macau Design Centre
- Traditional Chinese: 澳門設計中心
- Simplified Chinese: 澳门设计中心
Transcriptions
Standard Mandarin
- Hanyu Pinyin: Àomén Shèjì Zhōngxīn
Yue: Cantonese
- Jyutping: ou3 mun4*2 cit3 gai3 zung1 sam1

The Macau Design Centre (MDC; Chinese: 澳門設計中心) is a center in Nossa Senhora de Fátima, Macau, China to promote cultural creative industry in the region.

== History ==
The center was established on 15 November 2014 by Macau Designers Association.

== Architecture ==
The center is housed in a former factory. It consists of five stories, which contain a bookstore, a cafeteria, creative stores, an exhibition hall, a lab, a meeting room, a mezzanine, a rooftop garden, a stage and a studio.

== See also ==
- List of tourist attractions in Macau
