= Coloane Height Park =

Park in Macau

Coloane Height Park (previously known as Coloane Park) is a large park on the southern section of Coloane in Macau that opened in 1985.

Features of the park include:

- Coloane Hiking Trail
- picnic areas
- Goddess A-Ma statue (19.99m)
- fishing
- Coloane Peak (170m)

== See also ==
- List of tourist attractions in Macau
