= Hac Sa Beach =

Beach in Coloane, Macau, China

Coordinates: 22.12286°N 113.57245°E

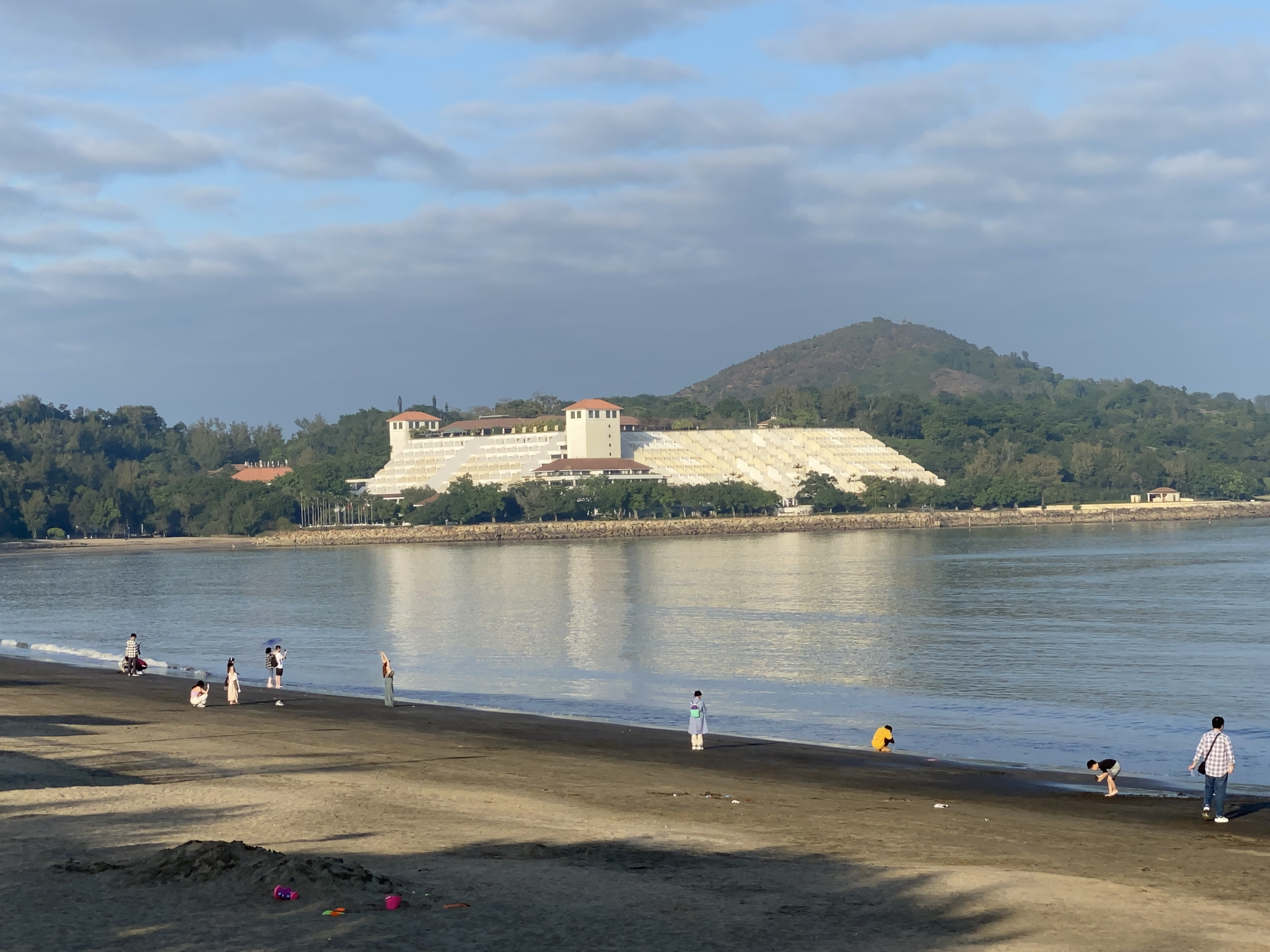
- Hac Sa Beach with the Grand Coloane Resort in the distance, 2023

Chinese name
- Traditional Chinese: 黑沙海灘
- Simplified Chinese: 黑沙海滩
- Jyutping: haak1 saa1 hoi2 taan1
- Literal meaning: Black sand beach
Transcriptions
Standard Mandarin
- Hanyu Pinyin: Hēishā Hǎitān
Yue: Cantonese
- Yale Romanization: Hāksā Hóitāan
- Jyutping: haak1 saa1 hoi2 taan1
- IPA: [hɐk̚˥.sa˥ hɔj˧˥.tʰan˥]

Portuguese name
- Portuguese: Praia de Hác Sá

Hac Sa Beach (Portuguese: Praia de Hác Sá; Chinese: 黑沙海灘) is a beach in Coloane, Macau. It is the largest natural beach in Macau.

== Name ==
The name "Hac Sa", a transliteration from Cantonese (Chinese: 黑沙; Jyutping: haak1 saa1; Cantonese Yale: Hāksā), literally means "black sand". The dark colour of the sand which gives the beach its name comes from the minerals in the water which is lighter than other volcanic beaches like those in Hawaii. However, to prevent the beach from disappearing due to erosion, the Macau government has refilled the beach with yellow sand artificially. The beach is located near Hac Sa Reservoir Country Park. A stream that originates from Hac Sa Reservoir runs through the central area of the beach.

== See also ==
- Hac Sa Park
- List of tourist attractions in Macau
