= Montanha Russa Park =

Suburban park in Nossa Senhora de Fátima, Macau, China

Coordinates: 22.204354°N 113.552576°E

Chinese name
- Traditional Chinese: 螺絲山公園
- Simplified Chinese: 螺丝山公园
Transcriptions
Standard Mandarin
- Hanyu Pinyin: Luósīshān Gōngyuán
Yue: Cantonese
- Jyutping: lo4 si1 saan1 gung1 jyun4*2

Portuguese name
- Portuguese: Jardim Municipal da Montanha Russa

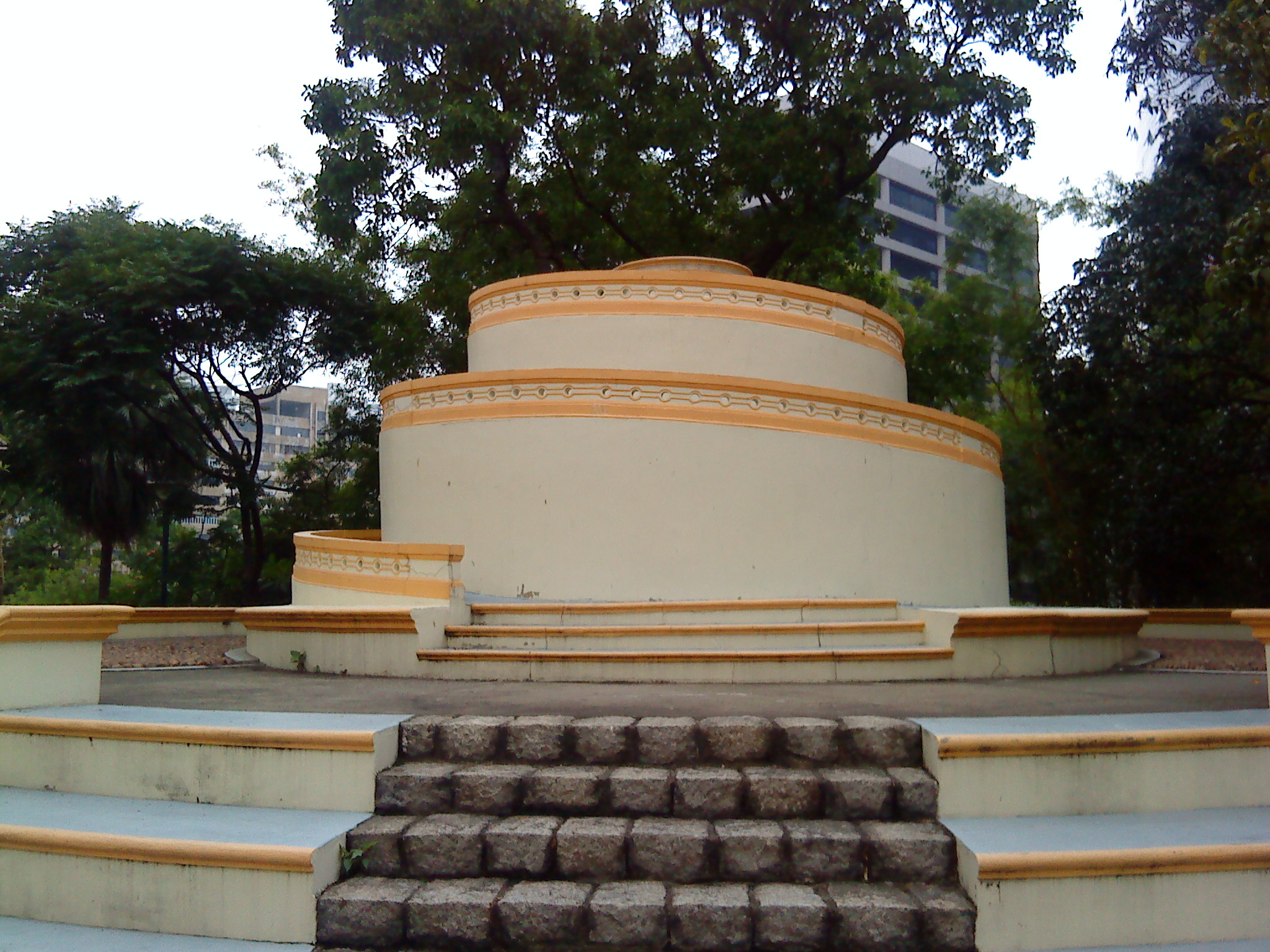
Montanha Russa Park

Montanha Russa Park (Chinese: 螺絲山公園; Portuguese: Jardim da Montanha Russa) is a suburban park in Nossa Senhora de Fátima, Macau, China, with a collection of local and European trees.

The park also has a Portuguese restaurant near the front gates.

== See also ==
- List of tourist attractions in Macau
