= Macao Giant Panda Pavilion =

Zoo in Coloane, Macau

Macao Giant Panda Pavilion 澳門大熊貓館 Pavilhão do Panda Gigante de Macau
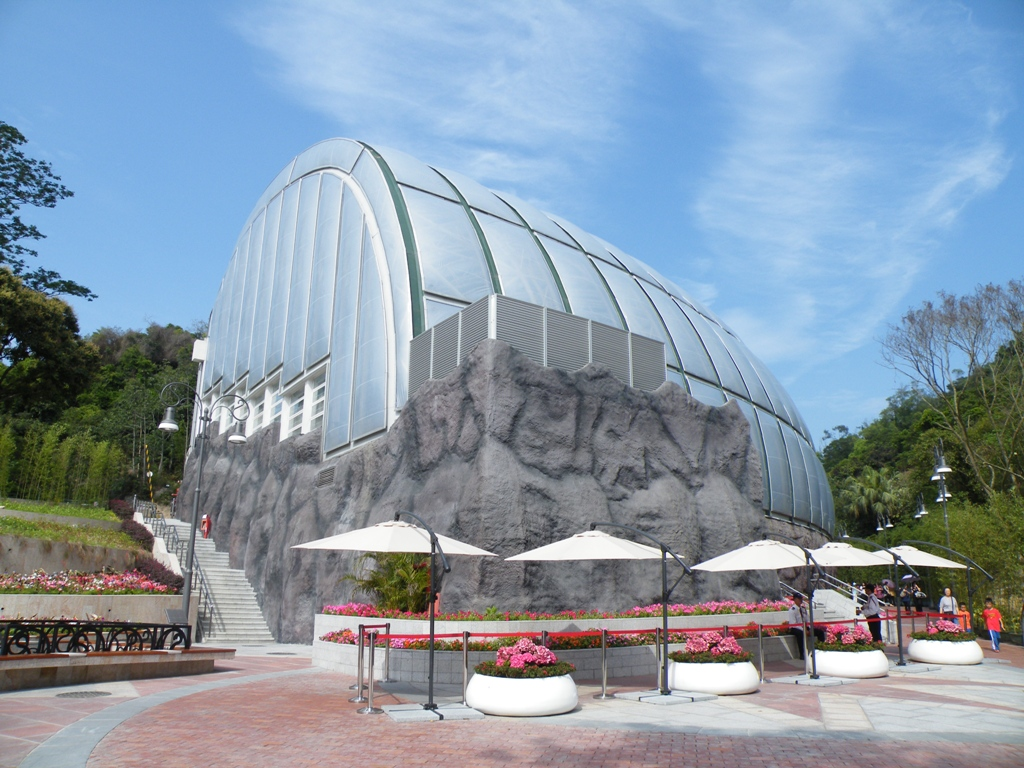
- Interactive map of Macao Giant Panda Pavilion 澳門大熊貓館; Pavilhão do Panda Gigante de Macau
- 22°7′35.9″N 113°33′32.3″E
- Location: Coloane, Macau, China
- Land area: 3,000 m^{2}
- Website: Official website

Macao Giant Panda Pavilion

Chinese name
- Traditional Chinese: 澳門大熊貓館
- Simplified Chinese: 澳门大熊猫馆
Transcriptions
Standard Mandarin
- Hanyu Pinyin: Àomén Dàxióngmāoguǎn
Yue: Cantonese
- Jyutping: ou3 mun4*2 daai6 hung4 maau1 gun2

Portuguese name
- Portuguese: Pavilhão do Panda Gigante de Macau

The Macao Giant Panda Pavilion (Chinese: 澳門大熊貓館; Portuguese: Pavilhão do Panda Gigante de Macau) is a zoo in Seac Pai Van Park, Coloane, Macau. The Panda Pavilion is a nature park containing multiple animal species ranging from gibbons, flamingos, monkeys, and of course the famous pandas. Admission is free to see the animals. The pavilion is shaped like a giant fan in an area of 3,000 square metres (32,000 sq ft). It consists of indoor activity quarters, outdoor yard and indoor exhibition area. The pavilion is equipped with a gift shop.

== See also ==
- List of tourist attractions in Macau
