= Our Lady of Fátima Church, Macau =

Church in Nossa Senhora de Fátima, Macau, China

Our Lady of Fátima Church
- 花地瑪聖母堂; Igreja de Nossa Senhora de Fátima
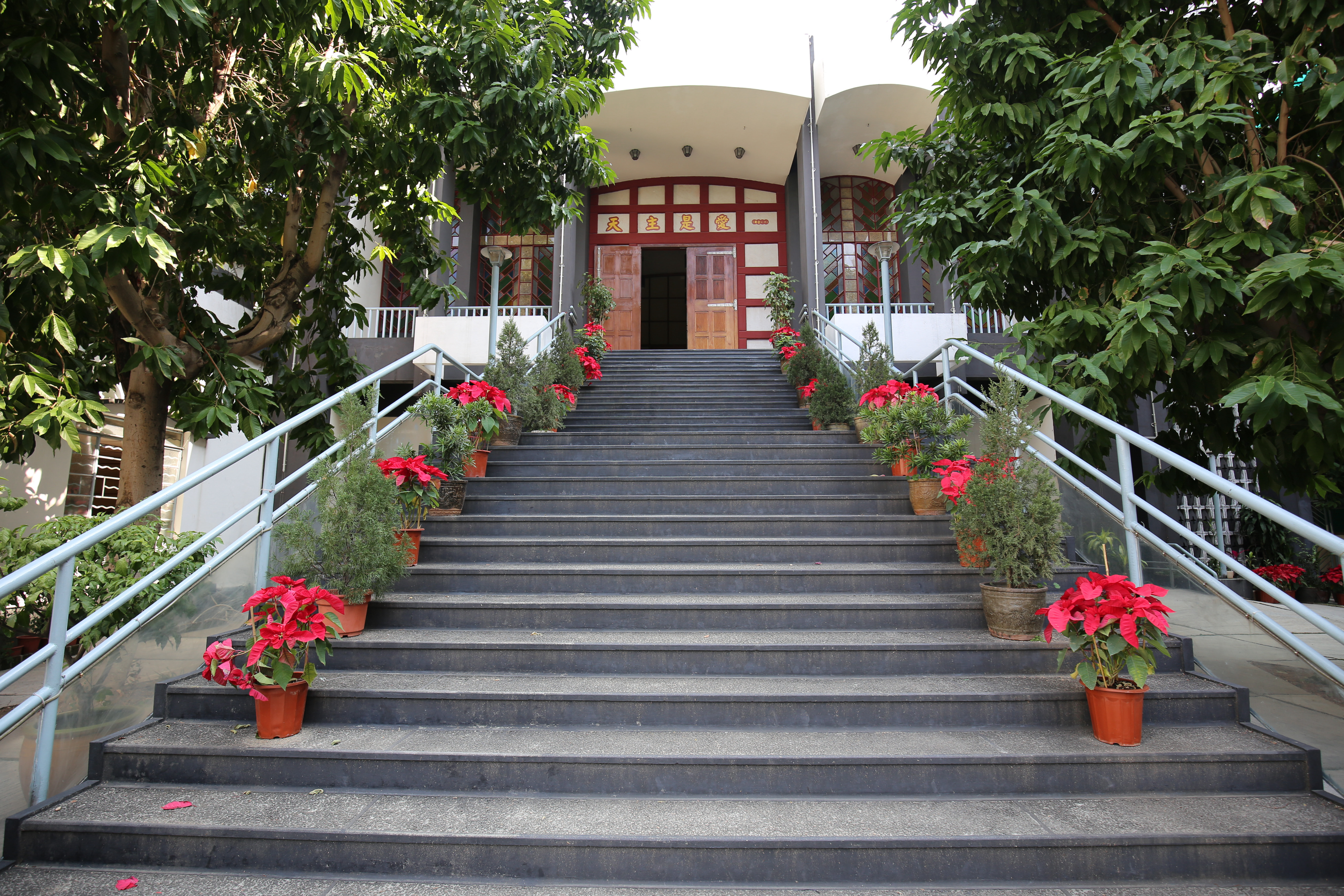
- Our Lady of Fátima Church
- 22°12′42.5″N 113°32′41.2″E
- Location: Nossa Senhora de Fátima, Macau
- Country: China
- Denomination: Roman Catholic
- Website: Official website (in Chinese)

Architecture
- Architectural type: church
- Completed: 1967

Administration
- Diocese: Macau

Clergy
- Bishop: Stephen Lee
- Priest: Michael Cheung Chun Kin IVE

Our Lady of Fátima Church, Macau
- Traditional Chinese: 花地瑪聖母堂
- Simplified Chinese: 花地玛圣母堂
Transcriptions
Yue: Cantonese
- Jyutping: faa1 dei6 maa5 sing3 mou5 tong4

The Our Lady of Fátima Church (Chinese: 花地瑪聖母堂; Portuguese: Igreja de Nossa Senhora de Fátima) is a church in Nossa Senhora de Fátima, Macau.

== History ==
The church was rebuilt in 1967.

== Architecture ==
The church has a contemporary design with a square tower with two bells. The design of the Church of Our Lady of Fatima was commissioned by bishop of Macau Dom Paulo Tavares in 1965. The original project was to build a church and a school on two adjacent sites. By 1965 the Bishop told the architect that one of the sites was no longer available. The dilemma then was how to build a church and a school on a site designated for the church. Architect Antonio M. Jorge da Silva suggested that the school could be built below the church building, but the compromise would be that the access to the church would have many more steps. The suggestion and design was approved by the Bishop on condition that the project would be of low cost. To reduce the cost and to maintain a reasonable height in the interior of the church the structural beams were inverted to be on the roof leaving the interior ceiling free of beams. The church was to have been constructed with two colors of concrete to avoid future painting. The addition of a black cement admix would make the church beams and exterior panels a medium grey leaving the curved under panels over the windows almost white.

The Church of Our Lady of Fatima was completed and inaugurated on the 7th of December 1968.

== Activities ==
The church regularly hold masses in the morning in Cantonese.

== See also ==
- List of tourist attractions in Macau
- Christianity in Macau
