= Kun Iam Temple =

Buddhist temple in Nossa Senhora de Fátima, Macau, China

- Chinese: 普濟禪院; Portuguese: Templo de Kun Iam Tong
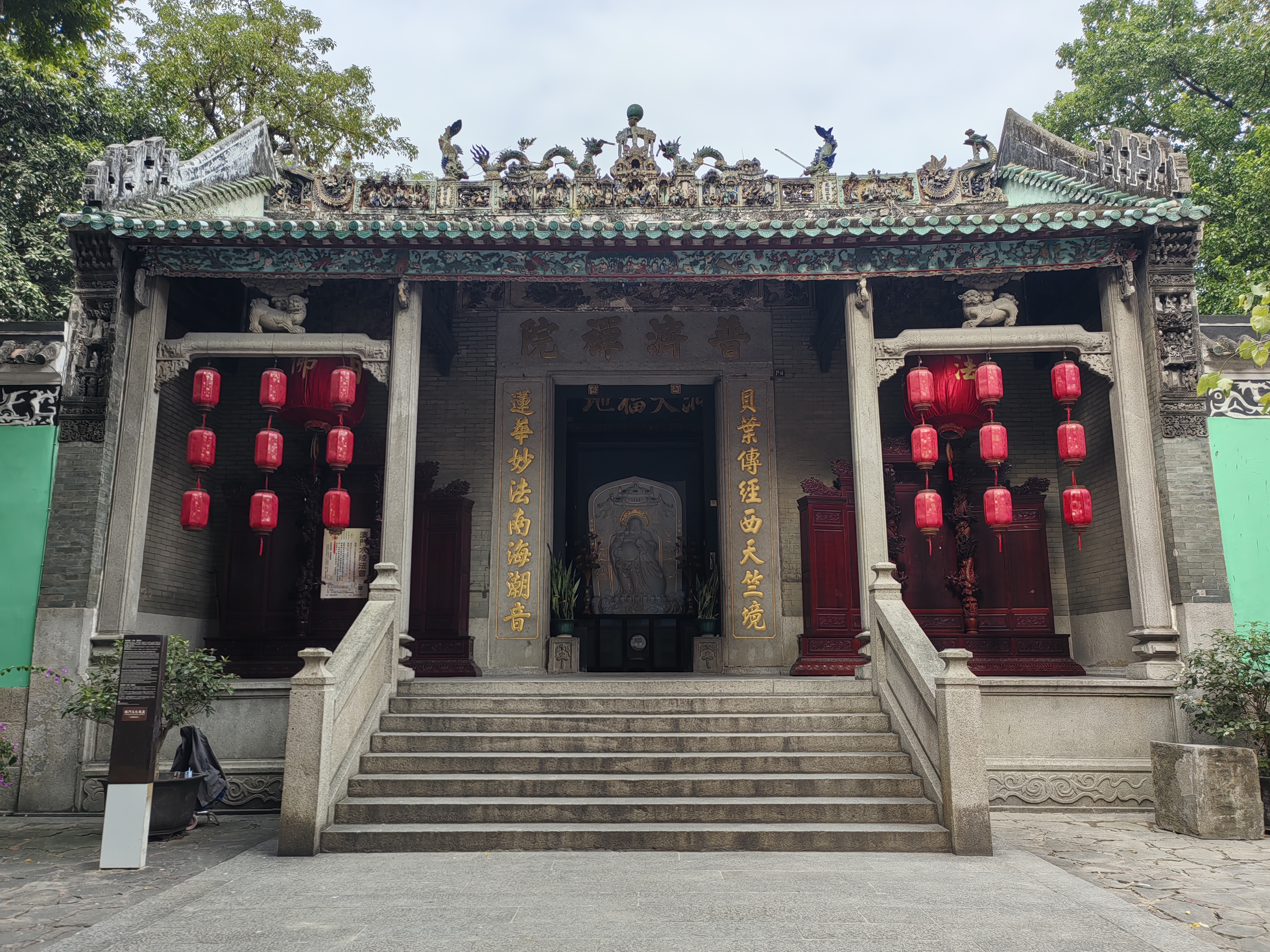

Religion
- Affiliation: Chinese Buddhism

Location
- Location: Macau
- State: China
- Interactive map of Kun Iam Temple
- Territory: Macau
- Coordinates: 22.204412°N 113.550197°E

Architecture
- Type: temple
- Completed: 1627

Kun Iam Temple

Chinese name
- Traditional Chinese: 普濟禪院
- Simplified Chinese: 普济禅院
Transcriptions
Standard Mandarin
- Hanyu Pinyin: Pǔjì Chányuàn
Yue: Cantonese
- Jyutping: pou2 zai3 sim4 jyun6

Portuguese name
- Portuguese: Templo de Kun Iam Tong

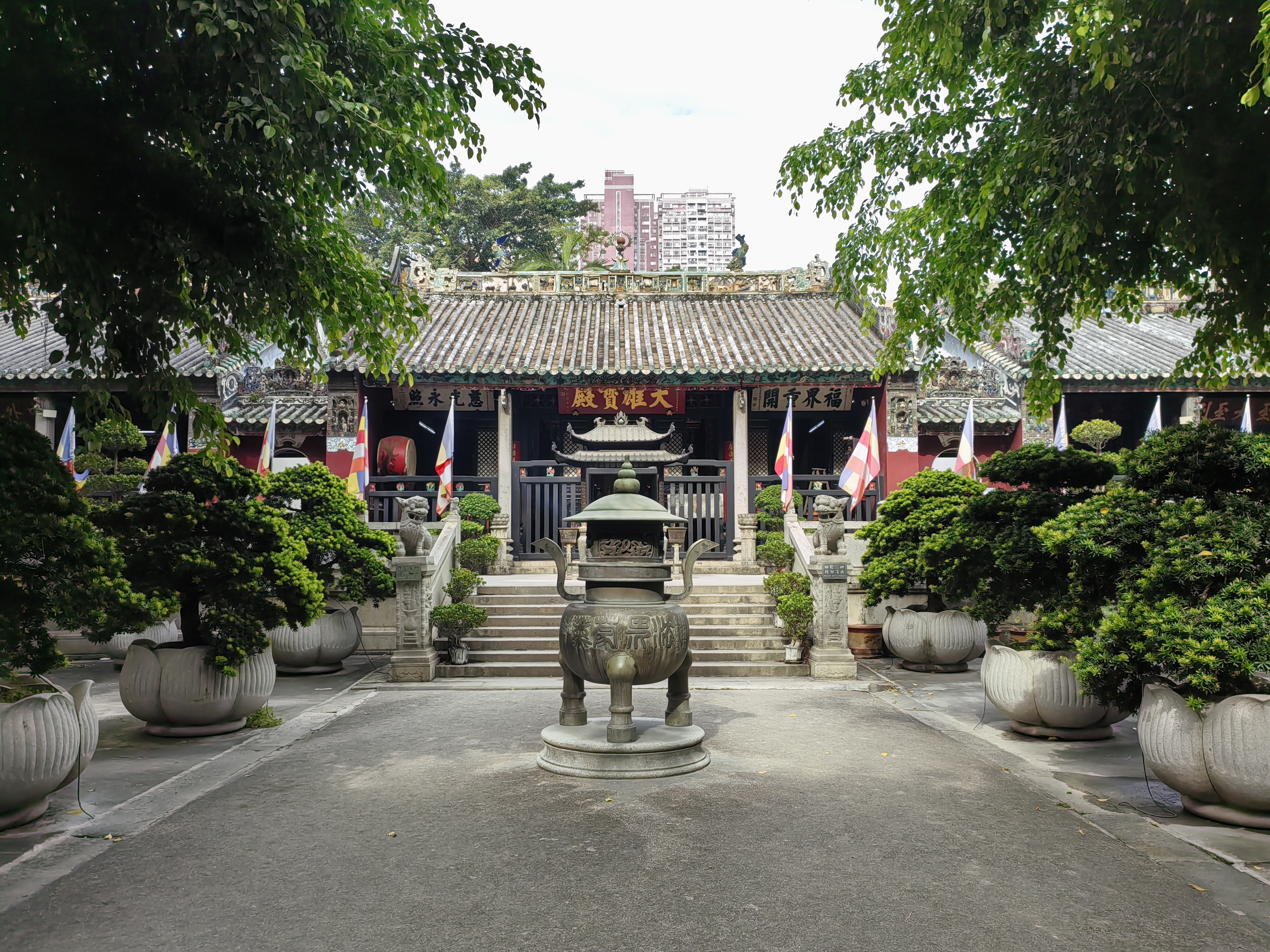
Inside Temple

The Kun Iam Temple (Chinese: 觀音堂, Portuguese: Templo de Kun Iam Tong) is a Chinese Buddhist temple in Nossa Senhora de Fátima, Macau, China. One of the three largest and richest Buddhist temples in Macau, its more official name is Pou Chai Sim Un (Pou Chai Temple, Chinese: 普濟禪院). It is regarded as one of the oldest temples in Macau, it was founded in the 13th century to venerate Kun Iam, the Chinese representation of Avalokiteśvara, the Bodhisattva of Mercy.

== Structure ==
The current buildings of the temple were built in 1627, as witnessed by a patio slab where it is written in Chinese: "Built in the seventh month of the seventh year of the reign of Emperor Tian Qi". The temple is located in Coronel Mesquita Avenue, in the Parish of Our Lady of Fatima, close to Mong Ha and Temples of Kun Iam Tchai and Seng Wong.

The temple has a large entrance gate and roofs decorated with porcelain figures. Inside the temple, there are 3 main pavilions. These pavilions are dedicated, respectively, to the Precious Buddhas, the Buddha of Longevity and Kun Iam. In the third pavilion, statue of Kun Iam is dressed in embroidered silk and decorated with a crown. To the rear, are terraced gardens, and one of them contains a commemorative arch. There are calligraphy scrolls and Chinese painting inside the temple of famous authors such as, Qu Dajun. During World War II, the Chinese painter Gao Jianfu lived and taught in the temple.

It was precisely at a stone table located in the gardens of the temple which was signed the first Sino-American Treaty on July 3, 1844 by the Viceroy of Liangguang Keying and the US Minister Plenipotentiary Caleb Cushing. This treaty is known as the "Sino-American Treaty of Mong Ha". Near the table, there are 4 older trees with intertwined branches, best known for "tree lovers" and that symbolise marital fidelity. Elsewhere in the garden there are a small pavilion that contains a marble statue of a monk, several sources in the form of miniature Chinese landscapes, groves of bamboo and small shrines to deceased monks.

The birthday of Kun Iam is celebrated on the 19th day of the second, sixth, ninth and eleventh lunar months.

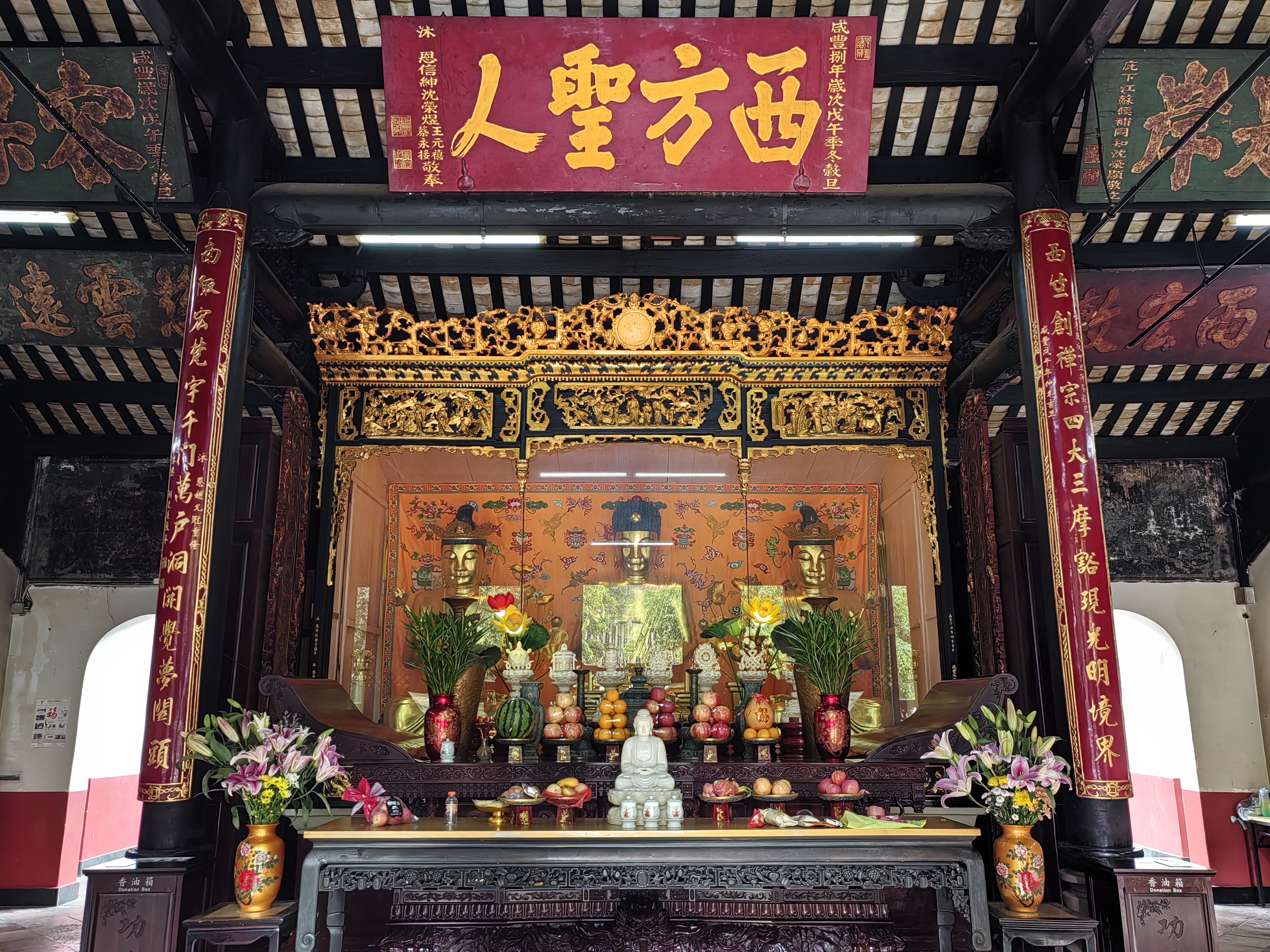

== See also ==
- A-Ma Temple
- Na Tcha Temple
