= Hac-Sá Park =

Ocean side park in Macau

Coordinates: 22.117953°N 113.568983°E

Chinese name
- Traditional Chinese: 黑沙公園和黑沙海灘休憩區
- Simplified Chinese: 黑沙公园和黑沙海滩休憩区
Transcriptions
Standard Mandarin
- Hanyu Pinyin: Hēishā Gōngyuán hé Hēishā Hǎitān Xiūqì Qū
Yue: Cantonese
- Jyutping: hak1 saa1 gung1 jyun4*2 wo4 hak1 saa1 hoi2 taan1 jau1 hei3 keoi1

Portuguese name
- Portuguese: Parque de Hác-Sá

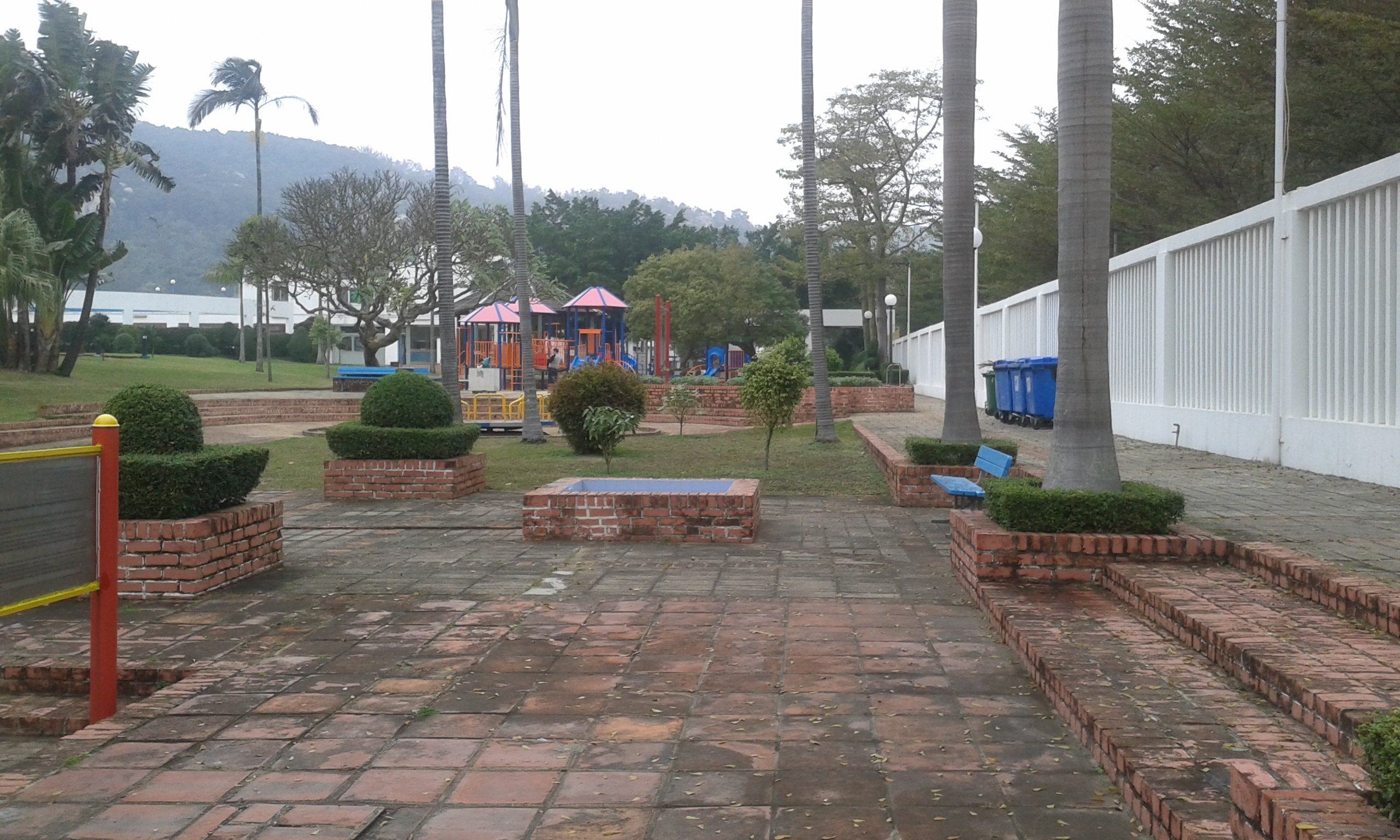
Barbecue area at Hac Sa Park

The Hac Sa Bay Park (Chinese: 黑沙公園, Portuguese: Parque de Hác-Sá) is an oceanfront park on Coloane in Macau. It is named for the black sand beaches (including Hac Sa Beach) in the area.

== See also ==
- List of tourist attractions in Macau
