= Guia Hill Cable Car =

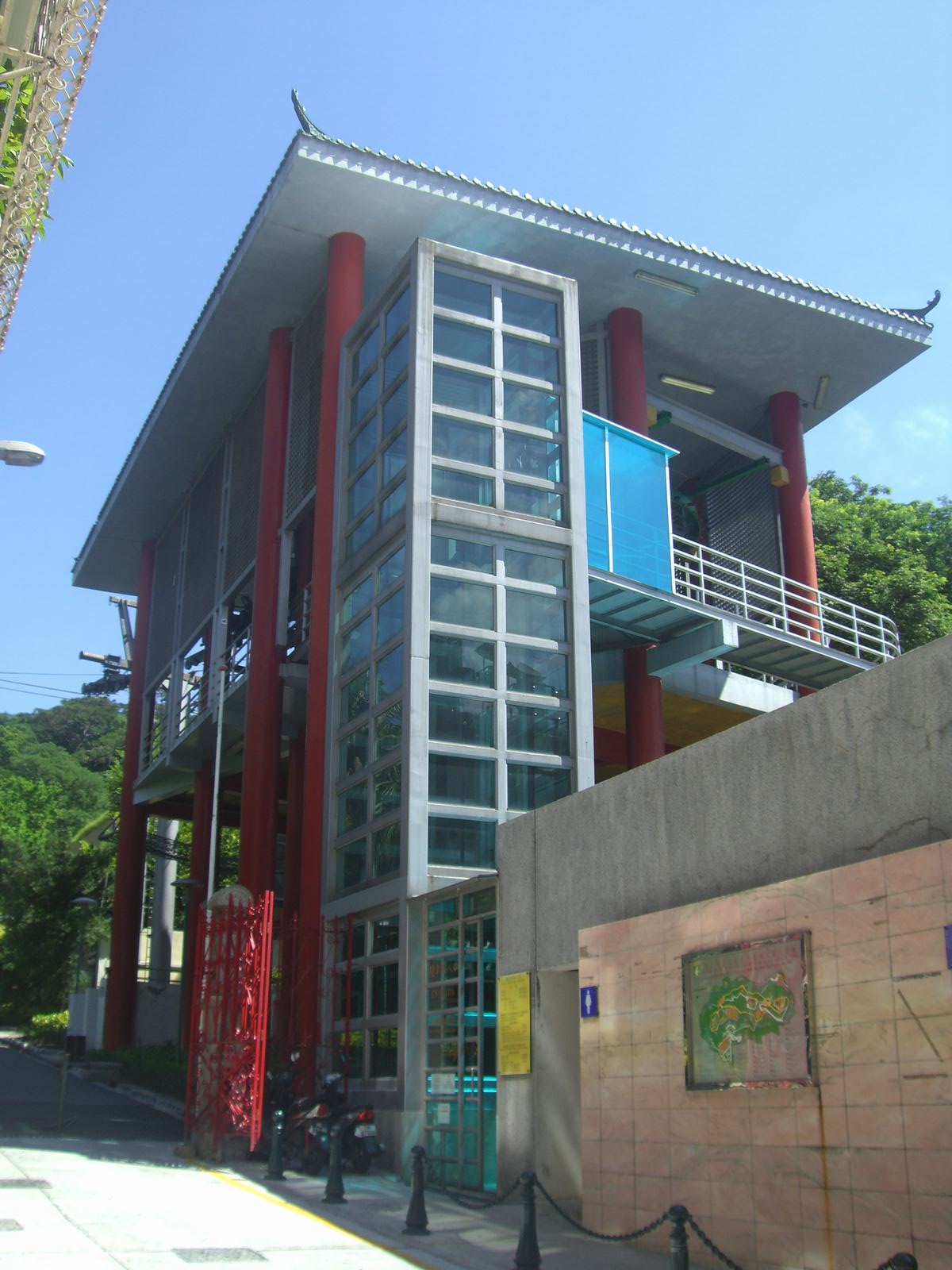
Cable car station at Jardim da Flora

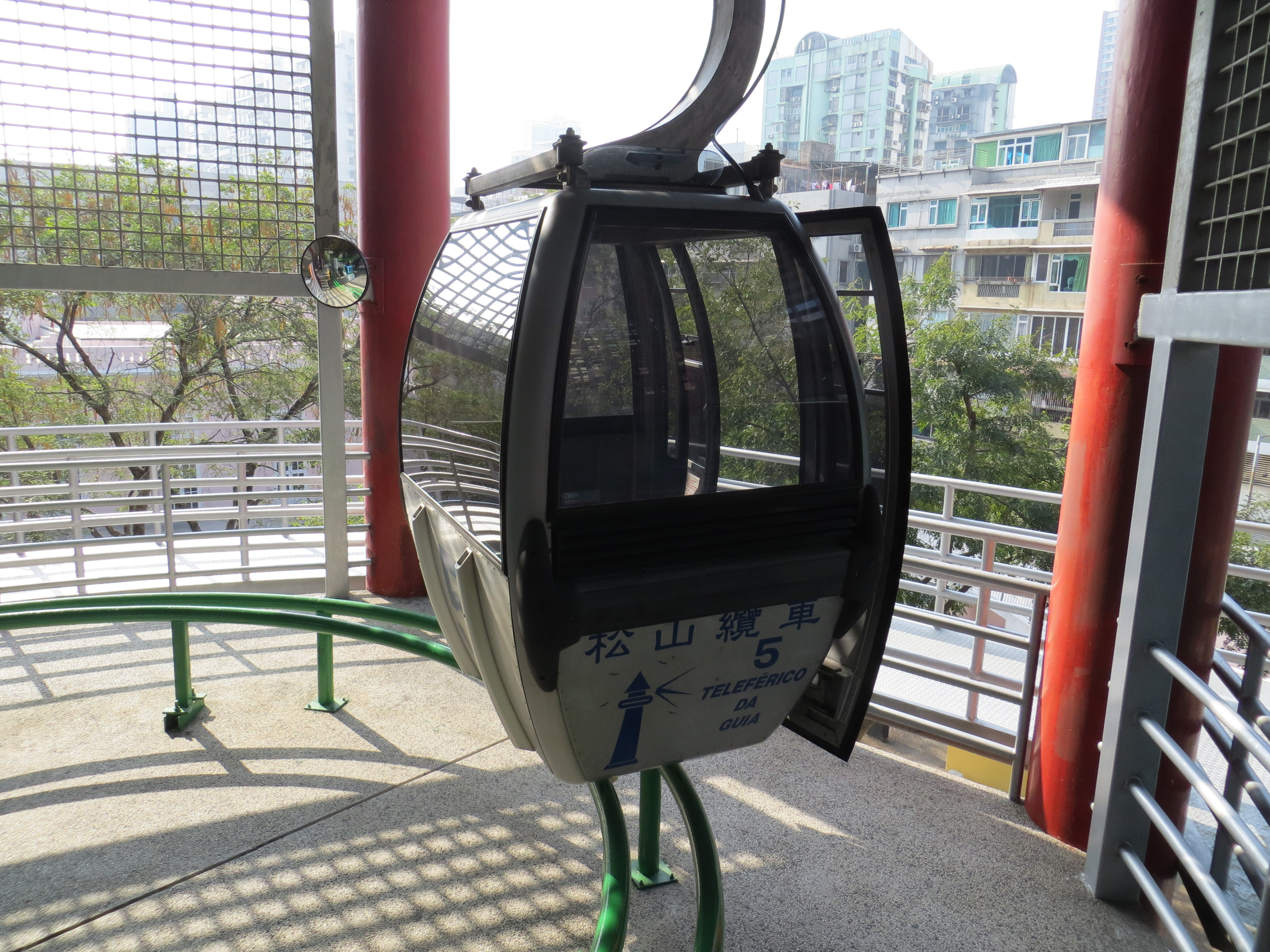
Cable car gondola lift

The Guia Hill Cable Car (Chinese: 松山纜車; Portuguese: Teleférico da Guia) is an aerial gondola lift system at Guia Hill, Macau. The system connects Jardim da Flora with Parque Municipal da Colina da Guia. It opened in 1997 and has nine cars (each holding four passengers). Visitors can gain a bird's-eye view of the garden and a panoramic perspective of the city. The ride takes 80 seconds.

== Ticket prices and operating hours ==
As of February 2023, one way adult ticket price is MOP$2, return is MOP$3. Special discount return ticket at MOP$2 is available to children aged 12 or below and older adults aged 65 or above. Opening hours are from 8 am to 6 pm. It is closed on Mondays.

== See also ==
- List of tourist attractions in Macau
