= Walls of Macau =

Wall in Macau, China

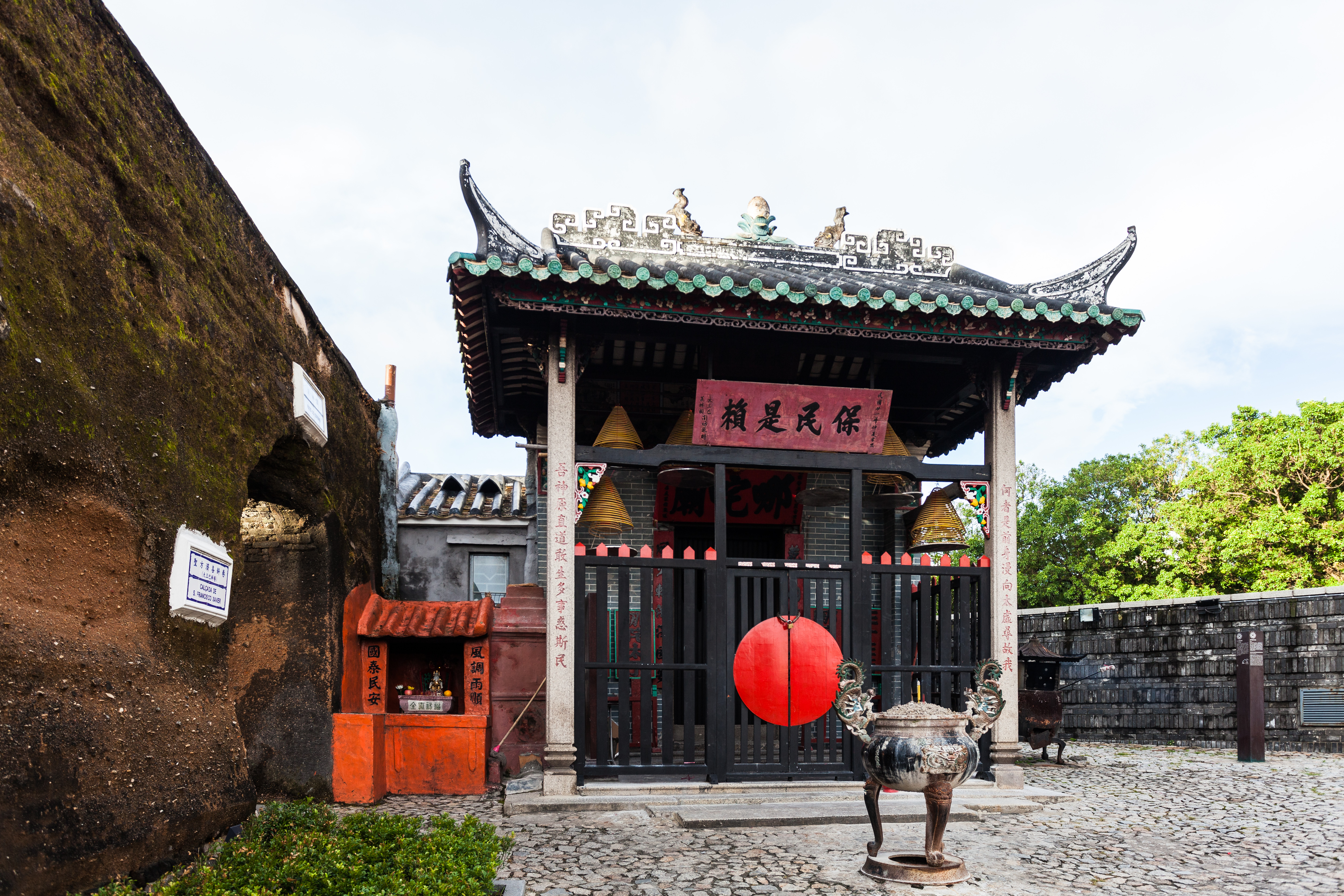
The remains of the city wall and Na Tcha Temple on the right

The Section of the Old City Walls are the remains of a wall that surrounded the colonial city of Macau, in Portuguese Macau, in the 16th and 17th centuries.

The wall's construction is unique because it was built of clay, sand, rice straw, rocks, and oyster shells.

== History ==
Its construction began as early as 1569, and the wall was used as a defensive measure against attacks by the Chinese and other invaders.

After a failed attempt by the Dutch to invade the city in 1622, it was fortified and greatly improved to withstand future military attacks. Because the wall was not properly maintained, it slowly collapsed over time, and only small portions still remain.

== Conservation ==
The Section of the Old City Walls is now part of the UNESCO Historic Centre of Macau World Heritage Site.

== See also ==
- List of oldest buildings and structures in Macau
