= Na Tcha Temple =

Temple in Macau, China

Na Tcha Temple Templo (de) Na Tcha
- 大三巴哪吒廟
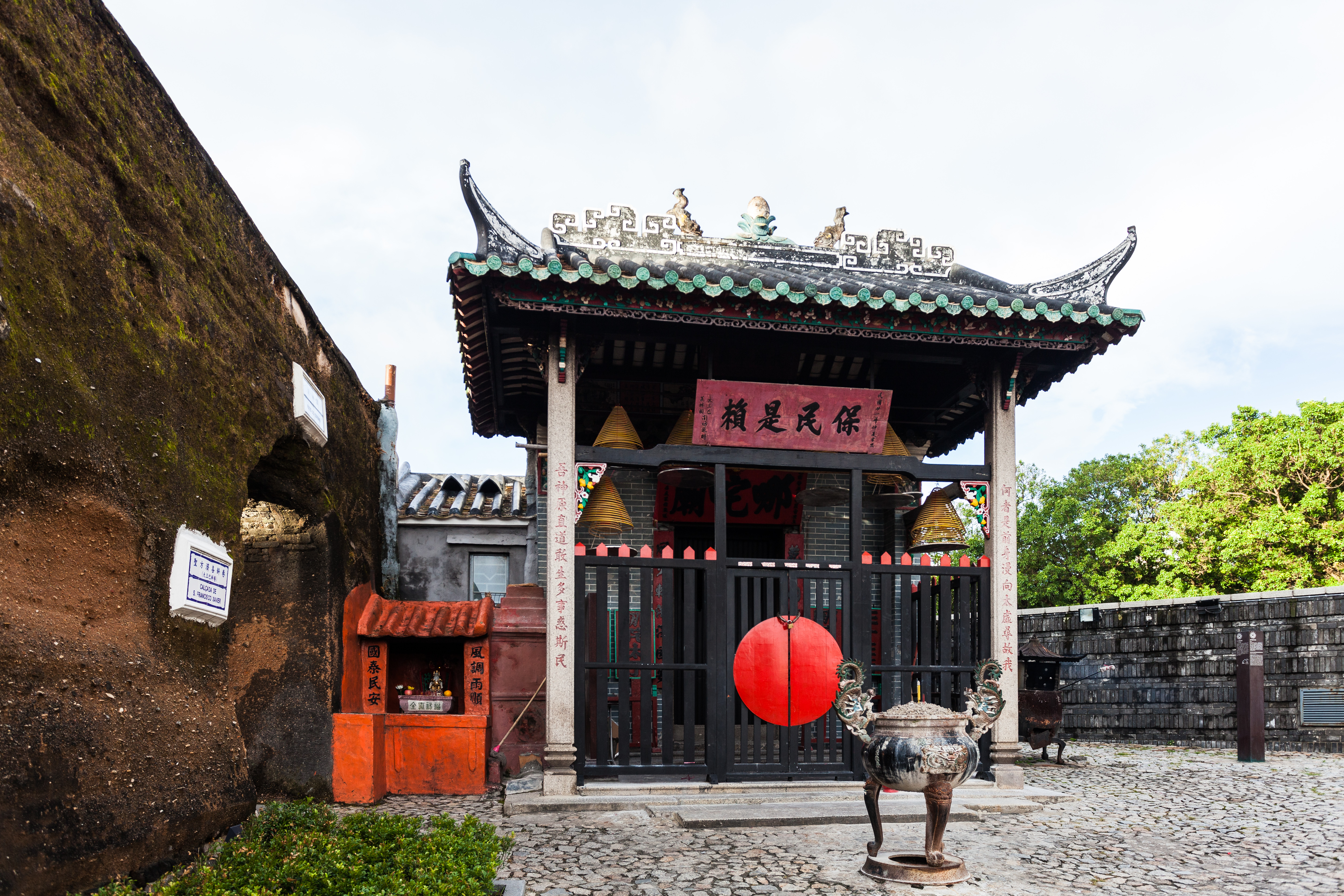

- Location within Macau

Location
- Location: Santo António, Macau, China
- Interactive map of Na Tcha Temple; Templo (de) Na Tcha
- Coordinates: 22°11′52″N 113°32′26″E

Architecture
- Type: Temple
- Completed: 1888

Na Tcha Temple

Chinese name
- Traditional Chinese: 大三巴哪吒廟
- Simplified Chinese: 大三巴哪吒庙
Transcriptions
Standard Mandarin
- Hanyu Pinyin: Dàsānbā Nézha Miào
Yue: Cantonese
- Jyutping: daai6 saam1 baa1 naa4 zaa1 miu6

Portuguese name
- Portuguese: Templo (de) Na Tcha

The Na Tcha Temple (Portuguese: Templo Na Tcha; Chinese: 大三巴哪吒廟), built in 1888, is a Chinese folk religion temple in Santo António, Macau, a special administrative region of China. It is dedicated to the worship of the popular Deity Na Tcha (哪吒) or Sam Tai Tsz (三太子).

== History ==
The Na Tcha Temple was built in homage to the guardian deity. It is believed that it was built to put an end to the plague ravaging the region during that time.

In 2004, the temple became one of the designated sites of the Historic Centre of Macau enlisted on the UNESCO World Heritage Site.

== Description ==
The small traditional Chinese temple is a simple single-chambered building measuring 8.4 meters (28 ft) long and 4.51 meters (14.8 ft) wide. The entrance porch opens to the temple building measuring 5 meters (16 ft) in depth. The building is painted gray, with few ornamentations, except for paintings on walls under the entrance porch. The temple's roof, rising five meters, is a traditional gable roof. True to traditional Chinese architecture, the Na Tcha has protective ceramic animal figurines on its ridge.

== Location ==
The temple is behind the Ruins of St. Paul's, remains of a principal Jesuit cathedral in the region, serving as one of the best examples of Macau's multicultural identity.

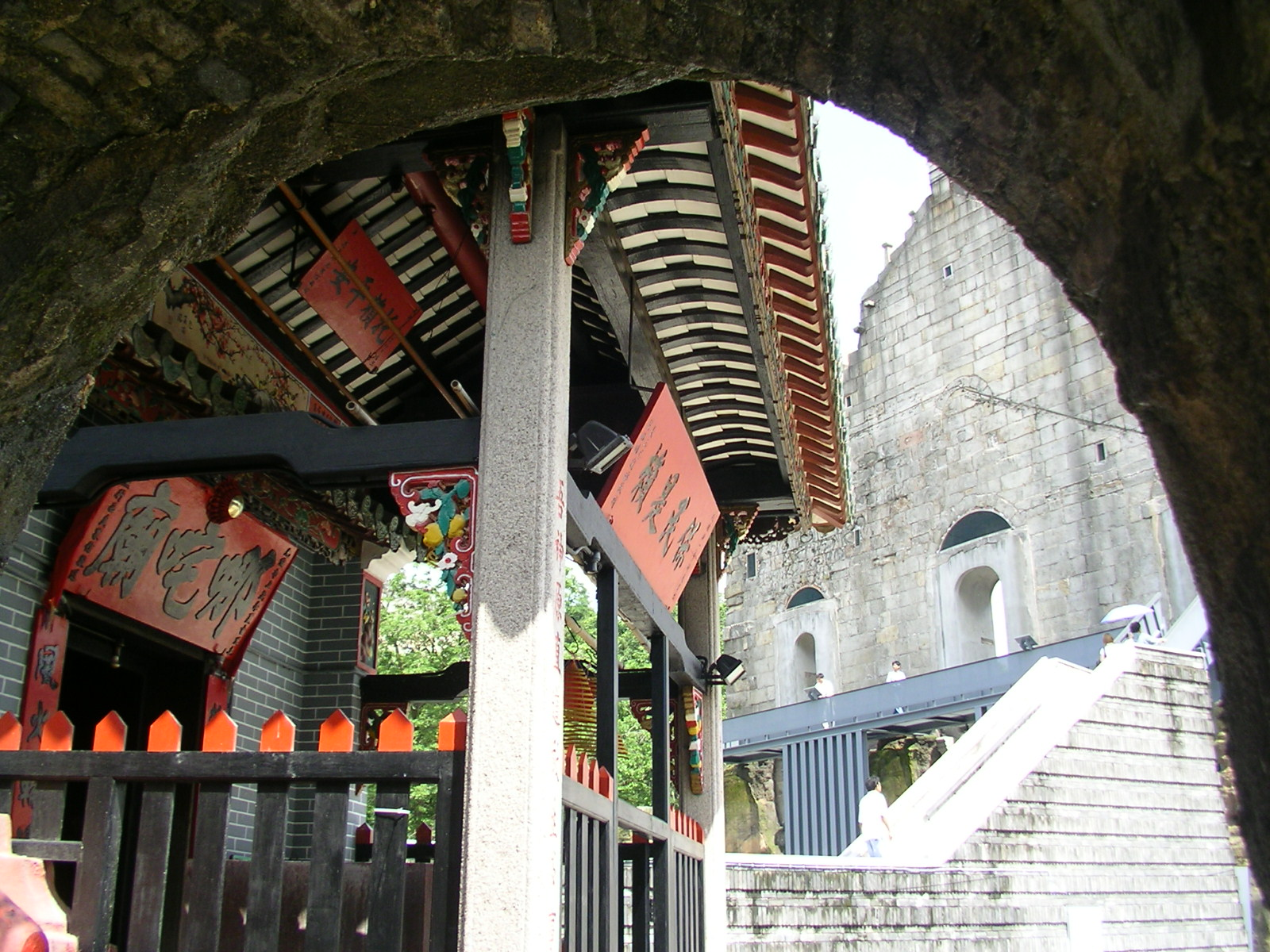
The temple as seen from under the old city wall

It stands where the ends of two alleys meet: the Rua da Ressurreição (大三巴右街, by St. Paul's) and the Calçada de S. Francisco Xavier (大三巴斜巷, a.k.a. 聖方濟各斜巷). The entry next to temple leads to the Pátio do Espinho, a tiny area within the old city wall.

== See also ==
- A-Ma Temple, built in 1488
- Kun Iam Temple, built in 1627
- Tam Kung Temple (Macau), built in 1862
- Sam Kai Vui Kun
- Sam Tai Tsz Temple and Pak Tai Temple, Hong Kong
- List of oldest buildings and structures in Macau
