= Comendador Ho Yin Garden =

Garden in Sé, Macau

Coordinates: 22.192131°N 113.54939°E

- 何賢公園
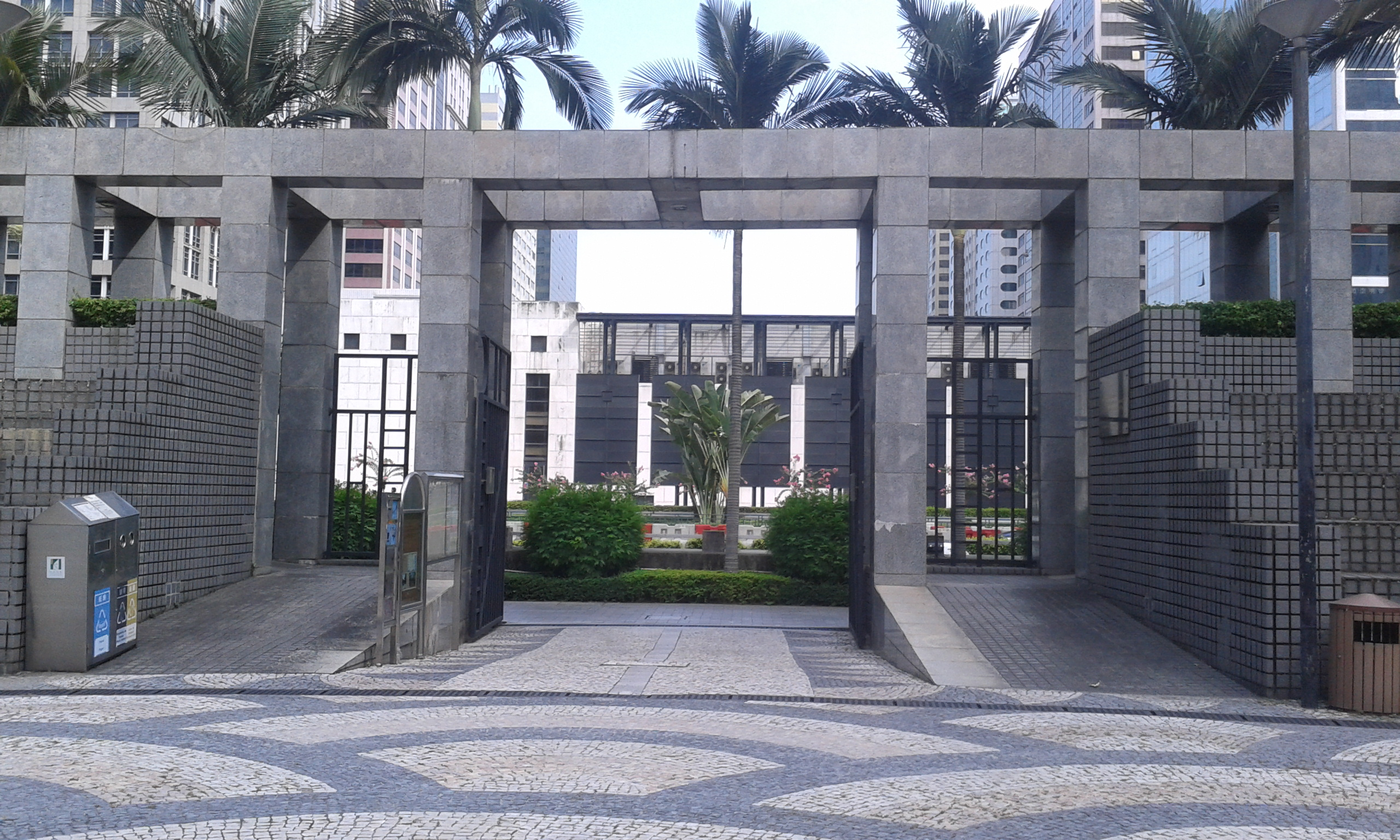
- Interactive map of Comendador Ho Yin Garden
- Type: Garden
- Location: Sé, Macau, China
- Opened: 1993
- Operator: IACM

Comendador Ho Yin Garden

Chinese name
- Traditional Chinese: 何賢公園
- Simplified Chinese: 何贤公园
Transcriptions
Standard Mandarin
- Hanyu Pinyin: Hé Xián Gōngyuán
Yue: Cantonese
- Jyutping: ho4 jin4 gung1 jyun4*2

Portuguese name
- Portuguese: Jardim Comendador Ho Yin

The Comendador Ho Yin Garden (Chinese: 何賢公園; Portuguese: Jardim Comendador Ho Yin) is a small garden in a residential area of Sé, Macau, named after Ho Yin.

== History ==
Comendador Ho Yin Garden was designed by Francisco Caldeira Cabral, opened by the last Governor of Macau Vasco Joaquim Rocha Vieira on 9 October 1993 with the name of Heung Shan Garden (Chinese: 香山公園) or Heung Shan Plaza (Chinese: 香山廣場).

The garden was renamed on 22 November 1996 by Municipal Council of Macau to commemorate Ho Yin's devotion to Portuguese-Chinese friendship.

Starting from May 2005, Macau Government started work to renovate the park, including to building a multi-story garage under the park and to cut off the park in order to connect Rua De Pequim and Rua de Luís Gonzaga Gomes.

The garden was gated until June 2007 after the renovation finished, only to be with gates erected again in 2015.

== Features ==
The park is located on Avenida de Amizade and features the Orient Arch as the central piece.

The park's features include:

- concrete chess tables
- benches
- playground
- gardens
- cafe
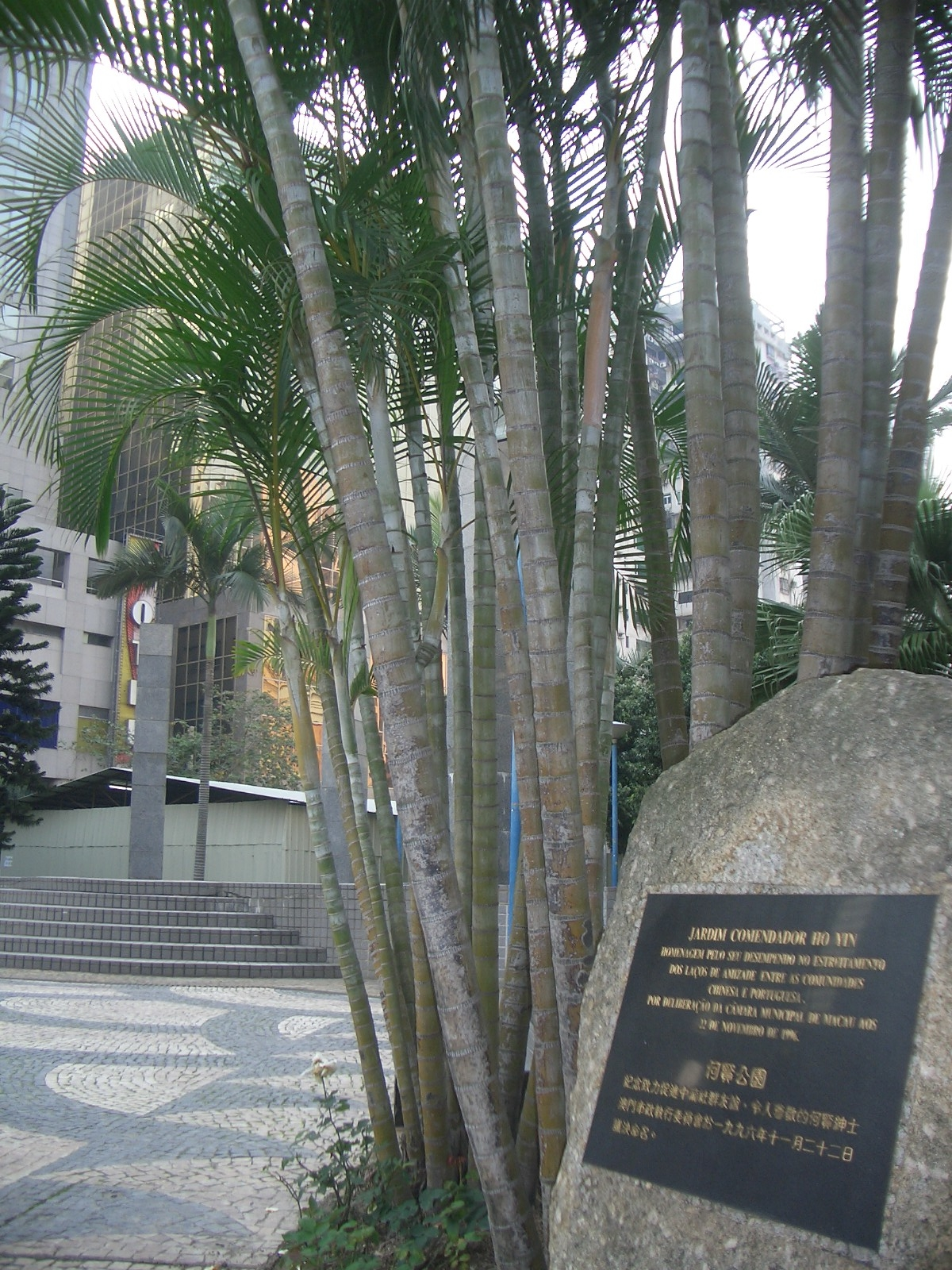
Comendador Ho Yin Garden

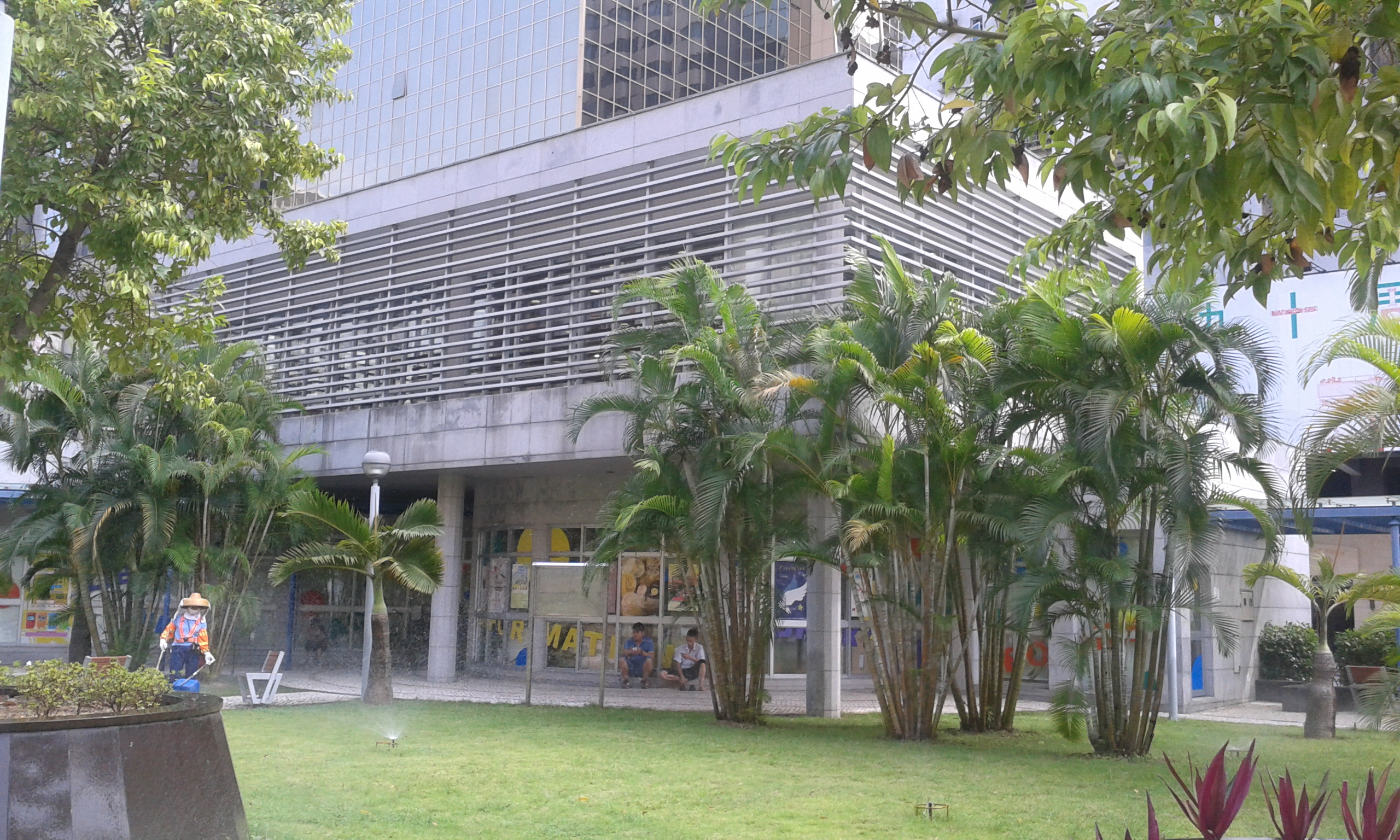
Library

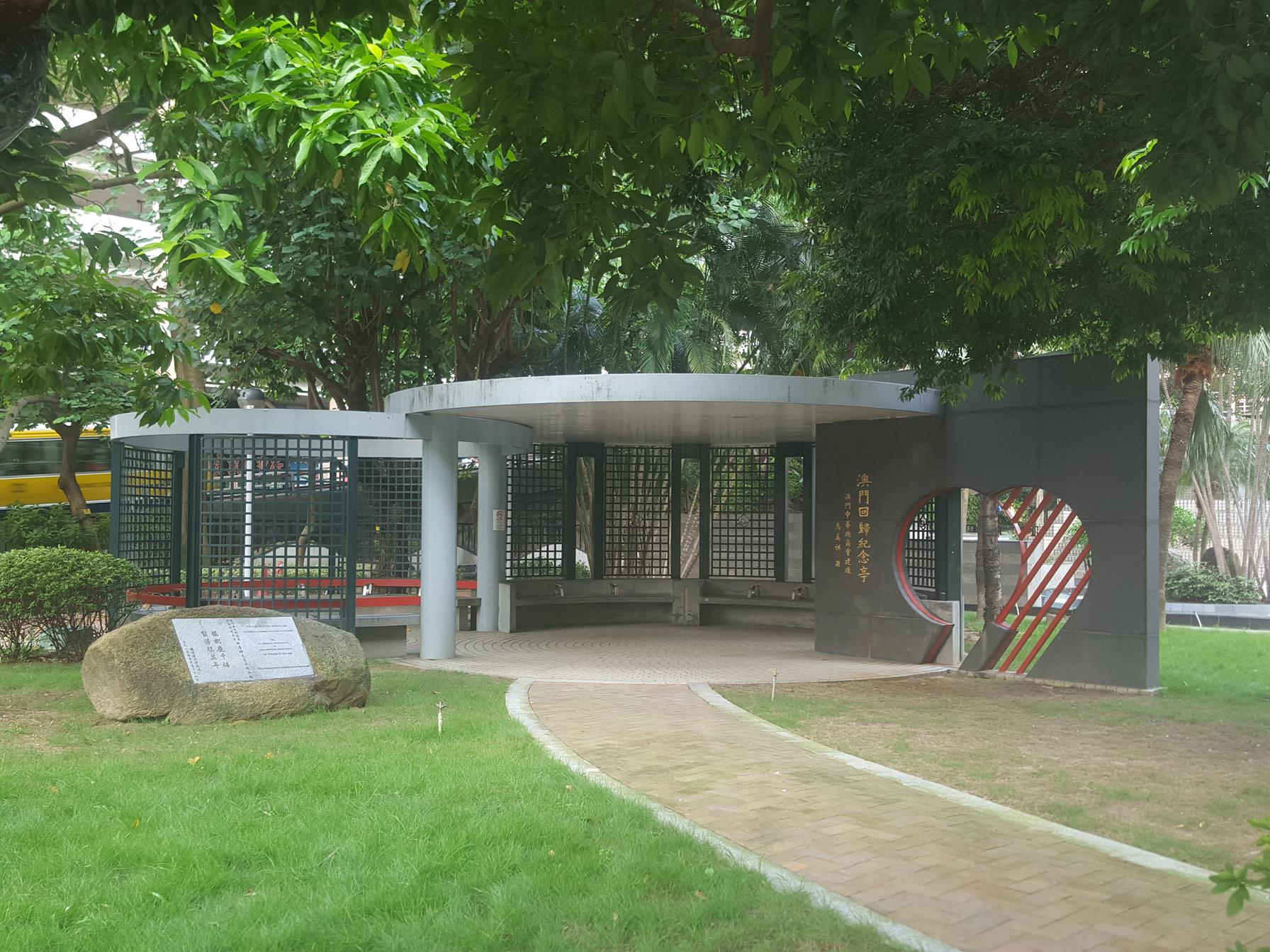
Comendador Ho Yin Garden

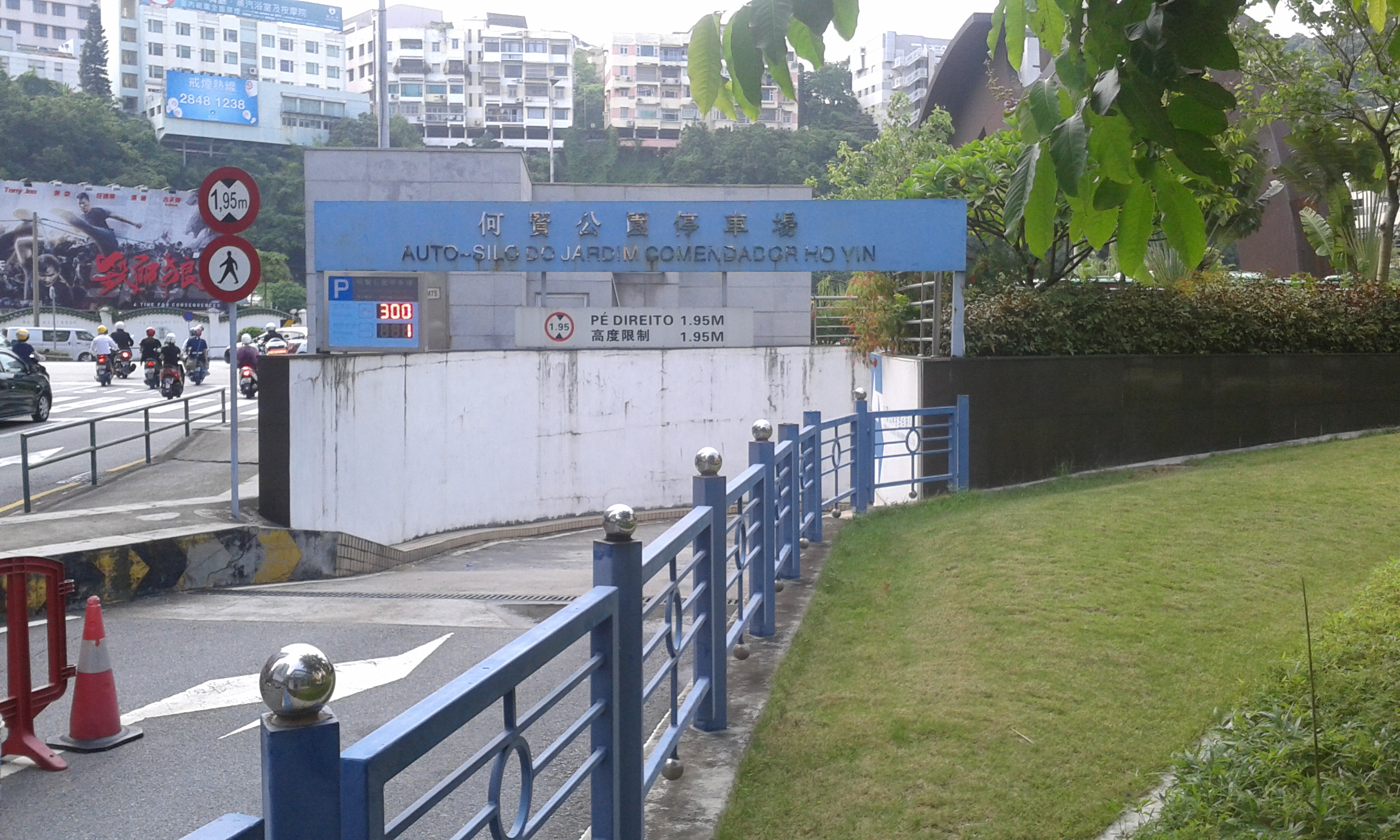
Car Park

== See also ==
- List of tourist attractions in Macau
