= Classified immovable properties =

The classified immovable properties are cultural heritage construction structures in Macau.

The designation comprise four categories, namely, monuments, buildings of architectural interest, ensembles (such as building compounds or complexes), and sites.

As of 2024, there were 165 classified immovable properties in Macau.

== List ==
| Location | Name and Notes | Number | Details | Photographs |
|---|---|---|---|---|
| Largo de Santo Agostinho 22.192204°N 113.538274°E | Igreja de Santo Agostinho; St. Augustine's Church | MM001 | | |
| | St. Anthony's Church and forecourt | MM002 | | |
| | St. Dominic's Church | MM003 | | |
| | St. Lazarus' Church and forecourt | MM004 | | |
| | St. Lawrence's Church and forecourt | MM005 | | |
| | Cathedral | MM006 | | |
| | St. Joseph's Seminary and Church | MM007 | | |
| | Ruins of Saint Paul's | MM008 | | |
| | Mong-Ha Fortress | MM009 | | |
| | Fortress of Our Lady of Bom Parto | MM010 | | |
| | Guia Fortress | MM011 | | |
| | Mount Fortress | MM012 | | |
| | St. Tiago da Barra Fortress | MM013 | | |
| | D. Maria II Fortress | MM014 | | |
| | St. Francis Fort and Barracks | MM015 | | |
| | Border Gate | MM016 | | |
| | Government House | MM017 | | |
| | Leal Senado Building | MM018 | | |
| | Holy House of Mercy | MM019 | | |
| Barra Square 22.186111°N 113.531139°E | A-Ma Temple (Barra Temple, Pagode da Barra Square) | MM020; Historic Centre of Macau | | |
| Rua de Cinco de Outubro, Largo do Bazar 22.196748°N 113.537935°E | Hong Kung Temple (康公廟), Hong Chan Kuan Temple (康真君廟), Bazaar Temple | MM021 | | |
| Avenida do Coronel Mesquita 22.202968°N 113.551483°E | Kun Iam Temple (Kun Iam Tchai) | MM022 | | |
| Avenida do Coronel Mesquita, Nossa Senhora de Fátima parish 22.204412°N 113.550197°E | Kun Iam Temple (Pou Chai Temple, Kun Iam Tong) (普濟禪院) | MM023 | | |
| Avenida de Almirante Lacerda 22.209837°N 113.547786°E | Lin Fung Temple (Lin Fong Temple) (蓮峰廟) | MM024 | | |
| Calçada das Verdades 22.195561°N 113.542377°E | Na Tcha Temple (Calçada das Verdades) (柿山哪咤古廟) | MM025 | | |
| Near St. Paul's Ruins 22.197778°N 113.540556°E | Na Tcha Temple (near Ruins of St. Paul's) (大三巴哪吒廟) | MM026; Historic Centre of Macau | | |
| Rua da Figueira 22.198883°N 113.541868°E | San Temple, Pao Kong Temple (Pau Kung Temple, 包公廟), I Leng Temple and Loi Tsou Temple | MM027 | | |
| Travessa da Corda 22.201745°N 113.542741°E | Lin Kai Temple (蓮溪廟) | MM028 | | |
| Rua da Cal, Horta e Mitra area 22.194889°N 113.545864°E | Ian Tak Tong Kong So (Lou Pan Si Fu Temple) Dedicated to Lu Ban | MM029 | | |
| Rua dos Pescadores 22.20439°N 113.558286°E | Tin Hau Temple | MM030 | | |
| Rua Sul do Mercado de São Domingos, Sé 22.194°N 113.539333°E | Sam Kai Vui Kun (三街會館) | MM031; Historic Centre of Macau | | |
| Rua da Palmeira 22.201969°N 113.539734°E | Tou Tei Temple (Patane) Dedicated among others to Tou Tei (土地), Kun Iam (觀音) and Buddha. | MM032 | | |
| | Old City Walls (sections on Calçada de S. Francisco Xavier) | MM033 | | |
| | Camões Grotto | MM034 | | |
| | Stone engraved with the coat of arms of Portugal (near Lin Fong Temple) | MM035 | | |
| | Stone engraved coat of arms, near the stairway and access to the social district of Mong-Ha | MM036 | | |
| Horta da Mitra Neighbourhood 22.194768°N 113.544780°E | Foc Tac Temple (Horta da Mitra Neighbourhood) | MM037 | | |
| Rua do Teatro 22.197447°N 113.538548°E | Foc Tac Temple (Rua do Teatro) | MM038 | | |
| No. 34 Rua do Patane 22.200253°N 113.540499°E | Foc Tac Temple (Rua do Patane) | MM039 | | |
| Rua do Almirante Sérgio 22.190848°N 113.533917°E | Foc Tac Temple (Rua do Almirante Sérgio) | MM040 | | |
| | Old City Walls (sections near Estrada de S. Francisco, Estrada do Visconde de S. Januário and near the Chapel of Our Lady of Penha) | MM041 | | |
| No. 80 Rua das Estalagens | Former Chong Sai Pharmacy (中西藥局舊址) | MM042 | | |
| | Former Residence of General Ye Ting | MM043 | | |
| Nos. 52-54 Rua da Palmeira | Night Watch House (Patane) | MM044 | | |
| Near Travessa de Coelho do Amaral 22.20646°N 113.545498°E | Sin Fong Temple (先鋒廟) Dedicated to Yang Ye | MM045 | | |
| Rua de D. Belchior Carneiro n.º 35 | St. Paul's College Archaeological Site (Section of the Old Wall at Rua de D. Belchior Carneiro) | MM046 | | |
| Rua de D. Belchior Carneiro | Remains of the Man-made Pit on Rua de D. Belchior Carneiro | MM047 | | |
| Calçada de S. Paulo; Pátio do Espinho; Beco do Craveiro 22.197499°N 113.541205°E | St. Paul's College Archaeological Site (Remains of the College Building and Remains of the Old Walls: Two Sections at Pátio do Espinho and One at Beco do Craveiro) | MM048 | | |
| No. 7 Travessa da Ponte 22.202062°N 113.541533°E | Seak Kam Tong Hang Toi Temple | MM049 | | |
| Largo do Pagode da Barra | Pier No.1 | MM050 | | |
| No. 24–26 Travessa da Porta | Chio Family Mansion | MM051 | | |
| No. 1 Rua de Silva Mendes | No. 1 Rua de Silva Mendes | MM052 | | |
| | Church of Our Lady of Carmel | MT001 | | |
| Rua Direita Carlos Eugénio, Taipa 22.153310°N 113.557758°E | Kun Iam Tong Temple (Taipa) | MT002 | | |
| Foothill of Kun Iam Rock, Taipa 22.164337°N 113.556043°E | Kun Iam Temple (Estrada Nordeste da Taipa) | MT003 | | |
| Rua Direita Carlos Eugénio, Taipa 22.153887°N 113.558531°E | I Leng Temple (醫靈廟), also known as Ka Sing Tong It was built in 1900 and is dedicated to I Leng Da Dai (The Great Emperor of Healing). | MT004 | | |
| Camões Square, Rua do Regedor, Taipa 22.152673°N 113.555682°E | Pak Tai Temple (北帝廟). Dedicated to the Taoist God of the North | MT005 | | |
| Corner of Rua Correia da Silva and Rua Governador Tamagnini Barbosa, Taipa 22.152215°N 113.555736°E | Tin Hau Temple (天后宮) | MT006 | | |
| Rua de Fernão Mendes Pinto, Taipa 22.155529°N 113.559455°E | Sam Po Temple (三婆廟). Dedicated to the elder sister of Tin Hau | MT007 | | |
| Cheok Ka Village, Taipa 22.161993°N 113.558504°E | Mou Tai Temple, Kuan Tai Temple and Tin Hau Temple | MT008 | | |
| | Taipa Fortress, at the quay | MT009 | | |
| Rotunda Tenente Pedro José da Silva Loureiro | Old Taipa Pier | MT010 | | |
| | Church of St. Francisco Xavier | MC001 | | |
| Avenida Cinco de Outubro, Coloane 22.11421°N 113.5501°E | Tam Kung Temple (譚公廟) or Tam Sin Sing Temple | MC002 | | |
| Avenida da República, Coloane 22.115291°N 113.551829°E | Tin Hau Temple (Old Temple of Tin Hau) | MC003 | | |
| On the hill of the Ka Ho Village, Coloane 22.131101°N 113.581909°E | Kun Iam Temple (Ká-Hó) (九澳觀音廟) | MC004 | | |
| Rua dos Navegantes, Coloane 22.118773°N 113.550919°E | Sam Seng Temple (三聖宮廟) Built in 1865. Dedicated to Kum Fa (Goddess of Golden Flowers), Goddess Kun Iam (Goddess of Mercy) and Va Kuong (God of Fire). | MC005 | | |
| Hac-Sá, Coloane 22.119810°N 113.567559°E | Tai Wong Temple | MC006 | | |
| Rua do Meio, Coloane 22.116140°N 113.551274°E | Kun Iam Temple (Coloane) | MC007 | | |
| Estrada de Nossa Senhora de Ká Hó | Sam Seng Temple (Ká-Hó) | MC008 | | |
| Largo do Cais | Coloane Pier | MC009 | | |
| | Santa Sancha Palace | AM001 | | |
| | Chapel of Our Lady of Penha and Bishop's Palace | AM002 | | |
| | St. Joseph's Seminary | AM003 | | |
| | Casa Garden | AM004 | | |
| Largo de Santo Agostinho 22.1925°N 113.537778°E | Sir Robert Ho Tung Library | AM005 | | |
| 22.191611°N 113.544306°E | Military Club | AM006 | | |
| | Moorish Barracks | AM007 | | |
| | Fire Services Bureau Building | AM008 | | |
| | Post Office | AM009 | | |
| No. 10 Avenida do Almirante Lacerda 22.2054°N 113.5447°E | Red Market | AM010 | | |
| | Lou Lim Iok Pavilion | AM011 | | |
| | Headquarters Building of the Banco Nacional Ultramarino | AM012 | | |
| | Building of the Luís Gonzaga Gomes Luso-Chinese Secondary School (Building of the former Pedro Nolasco da Silva Primary School) | AM013 | | |
| | Building of the Lingnan Middle School (Former Vila Alegre) | AM014 | | |
| | Building of the Pooi Tou Middle School (Praia Grande Branch) | AM015 | | |
| | Administrative Building of the Pui Ching Middle School (Former Lou Lim Ioc Residence) | AM016 | | |
| | Building of the Former Matteo Ricci College (Primary Section) | AM017 | | |
| Category:Largo de Santo Agostinho 22.191573°N 113.537302°E | Dom Pedro V Theatre | AM018 | | |
| | Consulate-General of Portugal in Macao and Hong Kong (Building of the Former St. Raphael Hospital and Garden) | AM019 | | |
| | Official Residence of the Consul-general of Portugal in Macao and Hong Kong (Building of the Former Bela Vista Hotel) | AM020 | | |
| | Building of the Monetary Authority of Macao (Building of the Former Convento do Precioso Sangue/ Convent of the Precious Blood) | AM021 | | |
| | Art Exhibition Pavilion for The Youth (Building of the Former Caixa Escolar) | AM022 | | |
| | Former Tai Neng Chinese Pharmacy | AM023 | | |
| | Former Opium House; Building cornering Praça de Ponte e Horta and Rua das Lorchas | AM024 | | |
| | Former Court Building | AM025 | | |
| | Lok Kok Restaurant | AM026 | | |
| | Mandarin's House | AM027 | | |
| | Cathedral Square, No. 1 | AM028 | | |
| | Lou Kau Mansion | AM029 | | |
| | House on Estrada do Engenheiro Trigo | AM030 | | |
| | Building at No. 679, Avenida da Praia Grande | AM031 | | |
| No. 165 Rua do Campo | Kou Hening Mansion | AM032 | | |
| | Building at No. 2, Company of Jesus Square | AM033 | | |
| | House on Rua Pedro Nolasco da Silva, nos 26–28 | AM034 | | |
| | Casa Jardine | AM035 | | |
| | House at No. 6, Avenida da República | AM036 | | |
| No. 64 Rua de Cinco de Outubro | Tak Sang Pawnshop | AM037 | | |
| No. 6 Rua de São Domingos | Kou Seng Pawnshop | AM038 | | |
| No. 59 Rua de Camilo Pessanha | Tak Seng Pawnshop (德成按) | AM039 | | |
| No. 3 Travessa das Virtudes | Ian Cheong Pawnshop | AM040 | | |
| | Building at No. 14 and 16, Avenida de Horta e Costa | AM041 | | |
| | Former Municipal Cattle Stable and Municipal Kennels of Macao | AM042 | | |
| | Building on Estrada do Cemitério, no. 6 (Blue House) | AM043 | | |
| No. 6 Calçada do Gaio | Building at No. 6, Calçada do Gaio | AM044 | | |
| No. 30 Estrada da Vitória | Building at No. 30, Estrada da Vitória | AM045 | | |
| No. 45–47 Rua Central | Moosa Houses | AM046 | | |
| No. 55 Calçada da Vitória | Building at No. 55, Calçada da Vitória | AM047 | | |
| No. 2 Estrada Nova | Building at No. 2, Estrada Nova | AM048 | | |
| No. 17–21 Largo da Companhia | Our Lady of Mercy Home for the Elderly | AM049 | | |
| Rua de S. Tiago da Barra | Former Barra Slaughterhouse Site | AM050 | | |
| | Museum of Taipa and Coloane History (Building of the Former Municipal Council of the Islands) | AT001 | | |
| | Pou Sun Pawnbroker's Tower | AT002 | | |
| | Building of the Coloane Library | AC001 | | |
| No. 239 Estrada de Nossa Senhora de Ká Hó | Nossa Senhora Village (Our Lady of Sorrows Church) | AC002 | | |
| Largo do Cais | Customs Station at Ká Hó Port, Coloane (Former Coloane Health Centre) | AC003 | | |
| | Avenida de Almeida Ribeiro/Largo do Senado/Largo de S. Domingos | CM001 | | |
| | St. Lazarus Quarter | CM002 | | |
| | Avenida do Conselheiro Ferreira de Almeida | CM003 | | |
| | Largo do Lilau and Beco do Lilau | CM004 | | |
| Largo de Santo Agostinho 22.1922°N 113.538°E | Largo de Santo Agostinho; St. Augustine's Square | CM005 | | |
| | Travessa de S. Paulo | CM006 | | |
| | Travessa da Paixão | CM007 | | |
| | Rua and Beco da Felicidade | CM008 | | |
| | Nos. 55–73 Avenida do Coronel Mesquita, and nos. 118–120 Estrada de Coelho do Amaral | CM009 | | |
| | Nos. 28–30, 34–36 Avenida do Coronel Mesquita, and nos. 151–157 Rua de Francisco Xavier Pereira | CM010 | | |
| | Largo do Carmo / Avenida da Praia | CT001 | | |
| | Largo de Camões/Rua dos Mercadores/Rua dos Negociantes/Rua do Meio | CT002 | | |
| | Largo Eduardo Marques/Rua dos Negociantes/Largo do Presidente Ramalho Eanes | CC001 | | |
| No. 239 Estrada de Nossa Senhora de Ká Hó | Nossa Senhora Village (Former site of the Leprosarium) | CC002 | | |
| | Tap Siac Square (Former Coronel Mesquita Sports Field) | SM001 | | |
| | Barra Hill | SM002 | | Barra Hill (left) |
| | Penha Hill | SM003 | | Penha Hill (right) |
| | Guia Hill | SM004 | | |
| | D. Maria II Hill | SM005 | | |
| | Mong-Ha Hill | SM006 | | |
| | Green Island Hill | SM007 | | |
| | Lou Lim Ioc Garden | SM008 | | |
| | Camões Park and Protestant Cemetery | SM009 | | |
| 22.2044°N 113.553°E | Montanha Russa Garden (Roller-coaster garden) (螺絲山公園) | SM010 | | |
| 22.192473°N 113.544672°E | S. Francisco Garden | SM011 | | |
| | Vitória Park | SM012 | | |
| | Vasco da Gama Park | SM013 | | |
| | Coast road from Macao-Taipa Bridge, to São Tiago da Barra Fortress | SM014 | | |
| | Rua Central/Rua de São Lourenço/Rua do Padre António/Rua da Barra/Calçada da Barra | SM015 | | |
| | Ponte e Horta Square | SM016 | | |
| | Parsee Cemetery (白頭墳場) | SM017 | | |
| | Dr. Sun Yat Sen Municipal Park | SM018 | | |
| No. 2A-4 Estrada do Cemitério | St. Miguel Arcanjo's Cemetery | SM019 | | |
| Travessa das Galinholas and Travessa do Alpendre | Former Site of Tarrafeiro Municipal Market (Former Site of Sei Mang Municipal Market) | SM020 | | |
| Taipa 22.1542°N 113.5594°E | Taipa Municipal Park (氹仔市政花園) | ST001 | | |
| near Rua Direita Carlos Eugénio | Carmo Fair (Former Site of Taipa Municipal Market) | ST002 | | |
| | Coastal avenue from Coloane Pier to Tam Kong Temple Square; Avenida 5 de Outubro, Coloane | SC001 | | |
| | Coloane Island, 80 metres above sea level | SC002 | | |
| | Lai Chi Vun Shipyards | SC003 | | |

== See also ==
- List of historic buildings and structures in Macau
- Historic Centre of Macau
