= List of historic buildings and structures in Macau =

The following is an incomplete list of historical buildings and structures in Macau.

== 15th century ==
Building	Year Completed	Builder	Source	Location	Image
A-Ma Temple	1488; 1828			St. Lawrence Parish	

== 16th century ==
Building	Year Completed	Builder	Source	Location	Image
Fortaleza do Monte	16th century	Portuguese army		St. Anthony Parish	
St. Dominic's Church	1550s			Cathedral Parish	
Camões Grotto	mid-16th century	Portuguese poet Luis de Camões		Inside Camões Park	
St. Lazarus’ Church	1557–1560			Rua de João de Almeida	
Holy House of Mercy	1569			Largo do Senado	
Old Macau City Walls Sections	1569			Beside Na Tcha Temple, near St. Paul's Ruins	
Cathedral of Saint Paul	1582	Portuguese Jesuits		St. Anthony Parish	
St. Augustine's Church	1591	Spanish Augustinians		Santo Agostinho Square	

== 17th century ==
Building	Year Completed	Builder	Source	Location	Image
Monte Fort House	1617–1626	Portuguese Jesuits		St. Lazarus Parish	
Guia Fortress	1622–1638			St. Lazarus Parish	
Fortress of Our Lady of Bom Parto	1622			Penha Hill	
Fortress of São Tiago da Barra	1622–1629			Avenida da República	
Kun Iam Temple (Pou Chai Temple)	1627			Nossa Senhora de Fátima	
Holy House of Mercy	1637				
Casa Gardens	1670s				

== 18th century ==
Building	Year Completed	Builder	Source	Location	Image
Wall of St. Francis Fortress, Macau	1720s			Avenida da Praia Grande	
Lin Fong Temple	1723			Avenida de Almirante Lacerda	
St. James Chapel Macau	1740			Macau	
St. Joseph's Seminary and Church	1746–1758			Rua do Seminario	
Sam Kai Vui Kun (Kuan Tai Temple)	1750			Rua Sul do Mercado de São Domingos	
Casa Garden in Macau Historical Ancient House and Garden	1770			Macau	
Leal Senado	1784			Cathedral Parish	

== 19th century ==
Building	Year Completed	Builder	Source	Location	Image
St. Augustine Church, Macau	1814			Macau	
Tou Tei Temple	1836–1895			Pagode do Patane Square	
Penha Church, Macau	1837			Macau	
St. Lawrence's Church, Macau	1846; original 1560			Rua de São Lourenço	
Taipa Fortress	1846			Northwestern Taipa	
Macau Government House	1846	Tomas de Aquino, Baron do Cercal		6 Estrada de Santa Sancha	
Macau Government Headquarters	1849			Avenida de Praia Grande	
Cathedral Church of Macau and Bishop's Palace	1849–1850, built 1622 with tapia (soil and straw) and restored 1780	Tomas d’Aquino		Cathedral Square	
Dona Maria II Fortress	1852			Dona Maria II Hill	
Lou Pan Si Fu Temple	1859, 1883			Rua da Cal, Horta e Mitra area	
Dom Pedro V Theatre	1860			São Lourenço	
Bazaar Temple, Macau	1860			Largo do Bazar	
Tam Kung Temple	1862			Coloane island	
Mong-Há Fort	1864; original 1849			Mong Ha Hill	
Tin Hau Temple, Macau	1865			Rua dos Pescadores	
Guia Lighthouse	1865				
Kun Iam Tchai Temple and Seng Wong Temple	1867			Avenida do Coronel Mesquita	
Kun Iam Small Temple	1871			Foothill of Kun Iam Rock, Taipa (near the University of Macao)	
Portas do Cerco	1871			border area of Macau with Zhuhai in Our Lady of Fatima Parish	
Macau Military Club-Macau Security Forces Museum	1872			Avenida da Praia Grande	
Moorish Barracks	1874	Cassuto		Calcada da Barra	
St. Michael Macau Chapel and Cemetery	1875			Macau	
Lin Kai Temple	1875–1905			Travessa da Corda	
Opium House	1880			Praça de Ponte de Horta	
Kun Iam (Ka Ho) Temple	1881; 1907			On the hill of the Ka Ho Village, Coloane	
Mandarin's House	1881			Macau	
Carmel Church Macau	1885			Taipa	
Na Tcha Temple	1888			Near St. Paul's Ruins	
Pao Kong Temple	1889			Rua da Figueira	
Lou Kau Mansion Macau Chinese House	1889			Macau	
Sir Robert Ho Tung Library -former home of Dona Carolina Cunha	1894			Santo Agostinho Square	
Macau Central Library	1895				
Na Tcha Temple on Calçada das Verdades	1898			Calçada das Verdades	
Island Council Building (present Civic and Municipal Affairs Bureau)	late 19th Century			Rua de Correia da Silva, Taipa	

== 20th century ==
Building	Year Completed	Builder	Source	Location	Image
Sun Yat Sen Memorial House	1912			São Lázaro	
Tak Seng On pawnshop	1917				
Coloane Public Library	1917			Coloane	
Tap Seac Gallery	1920s				
Taipa Houses–Museum	1921			Taipa	
Macau Protestant Chapel	1922			Camões Square, Macau	
original Banco Nacional Ultramarino Building	1926			Macau	
General Post Office, Macau	1929			Largo do Leal Senado	
St. Anthony's Church, Macau	1930			Santo António Square	
Red Market (building)	1936			Intersection of Avenida do Almirante Lacerda and Avenida de Horta e Costa	
Macau Cathedral	1937				
Court Building, Macau – served as government offices and Court of First Instance of the Macao Special Administrative Region; now future home of Macau Central Library	1951			Avenida da Praia Grande	
