= Military of Portuguese Macau =

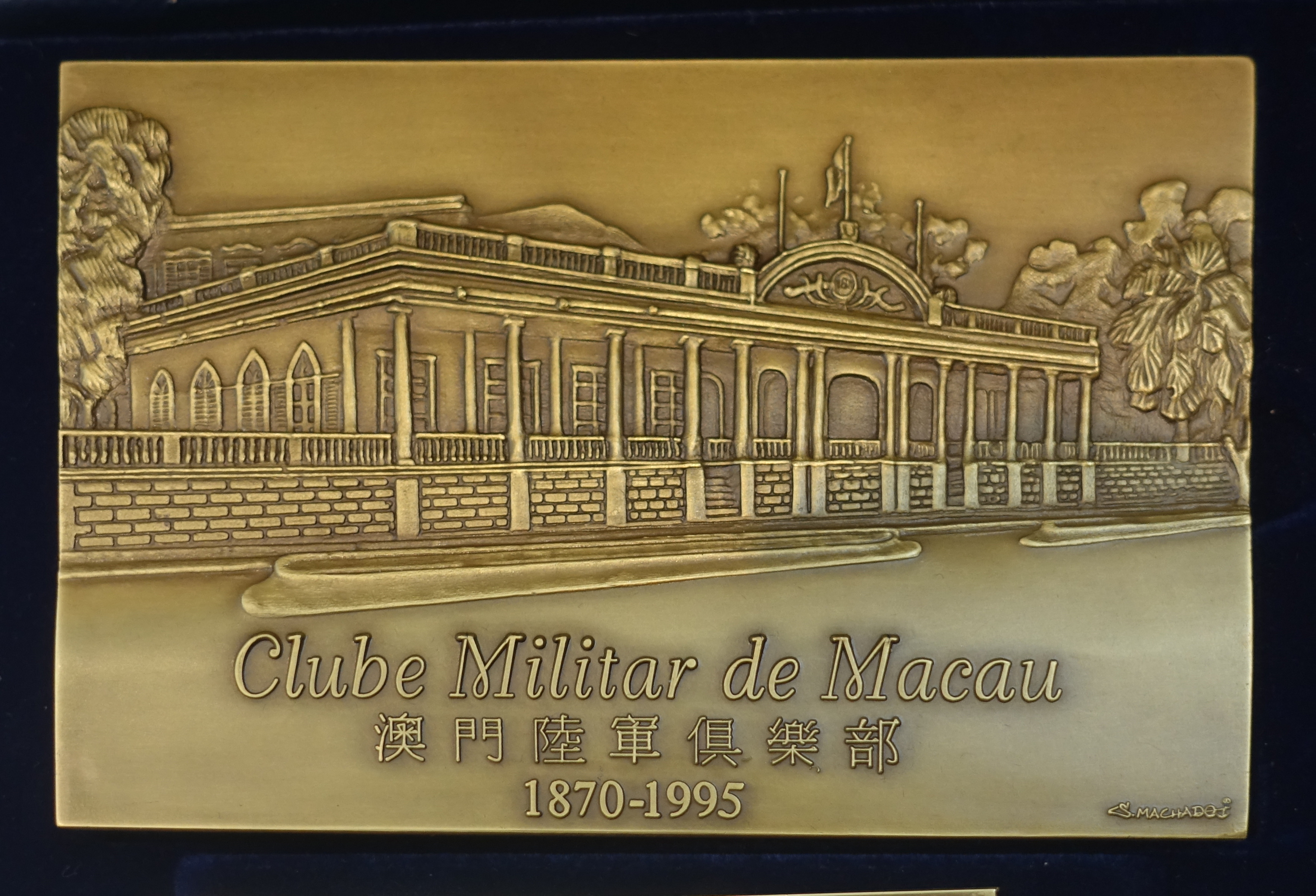
Plaque of the Macau Military Club, in operation 1870–1995.

Macau was under Portuguese rule from 1557 until 1999. During the final period of colonial administration prior to the handover of Macau to China, Portugal retained only limited numbers of military personnel in Macau for liaison and support purposes; the last major units having been withdrawn following the Carnation Revolution of 1974.

The Macao Garrison of the People's Liberation Army was established in 1999.

== Military installations ==
- Fortaleza do Monte 1616–1762
- Barra Fort — c. 1620s it once had 22 cannons and now site of Pousada De São Tiago Macau
- São Francisco Barracks 1864 — now home to the Office of the Secretary for Security
- Mong-Há Fort 1864–1960s — fort consisted of barracks with 10 artillery pieces

== Army ==
=== Historic ===
The permanent Portuguese military garrison of Macau dates from March 1691, replacing the employment as needed of sailors from warships based in the colony.

During much of the colonial period, the Portuguese garrison of Macau comprised a mixture of units from Portugal itself, African troops from Mozambique and locally recruited indigenous soldiers. Between 1784 and 1810, sepoys from Portuguese India were used to augment the regular troops. The colonial troops, whether Chinese, Indian or African, had Portuguese officers and some NCOs. In accordance with general Portuguese colonial practice, they served in units designated as Caçadores (light infantry).

Prior to 1914, a pale blue-grey zouave style uniform was worn by the Mozambiquean askaris with red fezzes and sashes for parade. The indigenous Macau units wore Chinese pattern dress of the same colour with conical headdresses.

=== 1936–40 ===
In 1936 the garrison consisted of 497 men – 22 officers, 35 NCO's and 440 soldiers; including 224 native Caçadores. The total was increased to 797 men by 1940. They were organised as follows:

- 1 European infantry company
- 1 European artillery company
- 1 heavy machine-gun company
- 2 native companies
- 1 depot section

=== 1941–45 ===
Following the surrender of Hong Kong in December 1941 the Japanese respected Portuguese neutrality. However, although Japan did not formally occupy Macau, Japanese troops transited the territory at will.

During World War II, the Portuguese military units stationed in Macau were:

- 1 Portuguese infantry company up to the start of World War II replaced by-
- 1st Mozambique Light Infantry (Mozambique Caçadores) Company
- 2nd Mozambique Light Infantry (Mozambique Caçadores) Company
- 1 Portuguese artillery company (Companhia de Artilharia)
- 1 heavy machine gun infantry company (Companhia de Metralhadoras)
- 2 native infantry companies (Companhia Indigena de Caçadores)
- 1 depot section
- military detachment in Taipa (Destacamento militar na Taipa)
- military detachment at Ilha Verde (Destacamento militar na Ilha Verde)

=== 1946–64 ===
Following the war, the machine gun company was changed to an armoured cavalry squadron equipped with armoured cars. Five indigenous companies (Companhia Indígena de Caçadores) were posted at Colane, Flora, Ilha Verde, Mong Ha and Portas do Cerco. An anti-tank company (Companhia de Anti-Carro) was posted at Ramal dos Mouros.

=== Final colonial period ===
The last of the Mozambican Caçadores were withdrawn from Macau in 1964, after the outbreak of the Portuguese Colonial War in Portugal's African possessions. The remaining Portuguese garrison in the colony effectively ceased to exist following the change of government in Portugal in 1974 and agreement on a timetable for a takeover by mainland China by 1999. For the remaining quarter-century of Portuguese administration, order was kept in the territory by a civilian police force without substantial military backing. Only Military Police Company 2428 of the 2nd Lancers Regiment was stationed in Macau from 1968 to 1970.

== Navy ==
The Macau Naval Aviation Centre was created in 1927 as a seaplane base on Taipa to combat piracy activities in and around Macau. It was decommissioned in 1933, but re-activated from 1937 to 1940. The naval station was later moved to the Exterior Port (now site of old Fishing Wharf and the Macau Ferry Terminal) in 1940 and decommissioned after 1942. The naval station in Macau was part of the Far East Fleet covering Macau, Portuguese Timor, Lapa and Montanha (during World War II only).

=== Naval forces ===
Portuguese naval ships stationed in Macau:

- cruiser Rainha Dona Amélia – stationed early 1900s (1909–1911).
- cruiser Vasco da Gama – stationed or stopover in the early 1900s (1904–1905, 1909–1910).
- cruiser Adamastor – stationed or stopover in the early 1900s (1904–1905, 1912–1913, 1927–1928, 1930–1933).
- gunboat Pátria – constructed in Lisbon in 1903 and entering service in Macau in 1909–1930.
- small shallow-draught gunboat Macau – built by Yarrows in Scotland, shipped to Hong Kong in crates, and launched in 1909. The Macau was sold to the Japanese in 1943 where it was renamed the Maiko. Surrendered to the Chinese nationalists in 1945, the boat was renamed Wu Feng in 1946 and later served in the PLA Navy until it was struck in 1968.

=== Naval aviation ===
A naval air station was established in 1927 with limited equipment.

A list of some aircraft stationed in Macau prior to 1974:

- 3 Fairey IIID – recon biplane – sent in 1927 and retired by naval aviation in 1931
- 4 Hawker Osprey floatplanes naval biplane light-bomber (sent before or around 1940) and retired by naval aviation in 1942
- Avro 626 biplane trainer introduced in 1939 and retired by naval aviation in 1950
- Grumman G-21B amphibious monoplane introduced in 1940 and transferred to Air Force in 1952

When it was discovered that neutral Macau was planning to sell aviation fuel to Japan, aircraft from the USS Enterprise bombed and strafed the hangar of the Naval Aviation Centre during the South China Sea raid on 16 January 1945 to destroy the fuel. American air raids on targets in Macau were also made on 25 February and 11 June 1945. Following Portuguese government protests, in 1950 the United States paid US$20,255,952 to Portugal.

The Japanese presence ended in August 1945.

== Air Force ==
From 1956 to 1974, Macau was part of the 3rd Aerial Region (3ª Região Aérea) of the Portuguese Air Force with its headquarters in Lourenço Marques, Portuguese Mozambique (now Maputo, Mozambique). No Air Force unit was however stationed at Macau.

== Commanders in Macau ==
- Governor Gabriel Maurício Teixeira 1941–1945
- Chief of Staff: Major Carlos da Silva Carvalho

== See also ==
- British Forces Overseas Hong Kong
