= Taipa Fortress =

Fortress in Taipa, Macau, China

Coordinates: 22.1571°N 113.5423°E

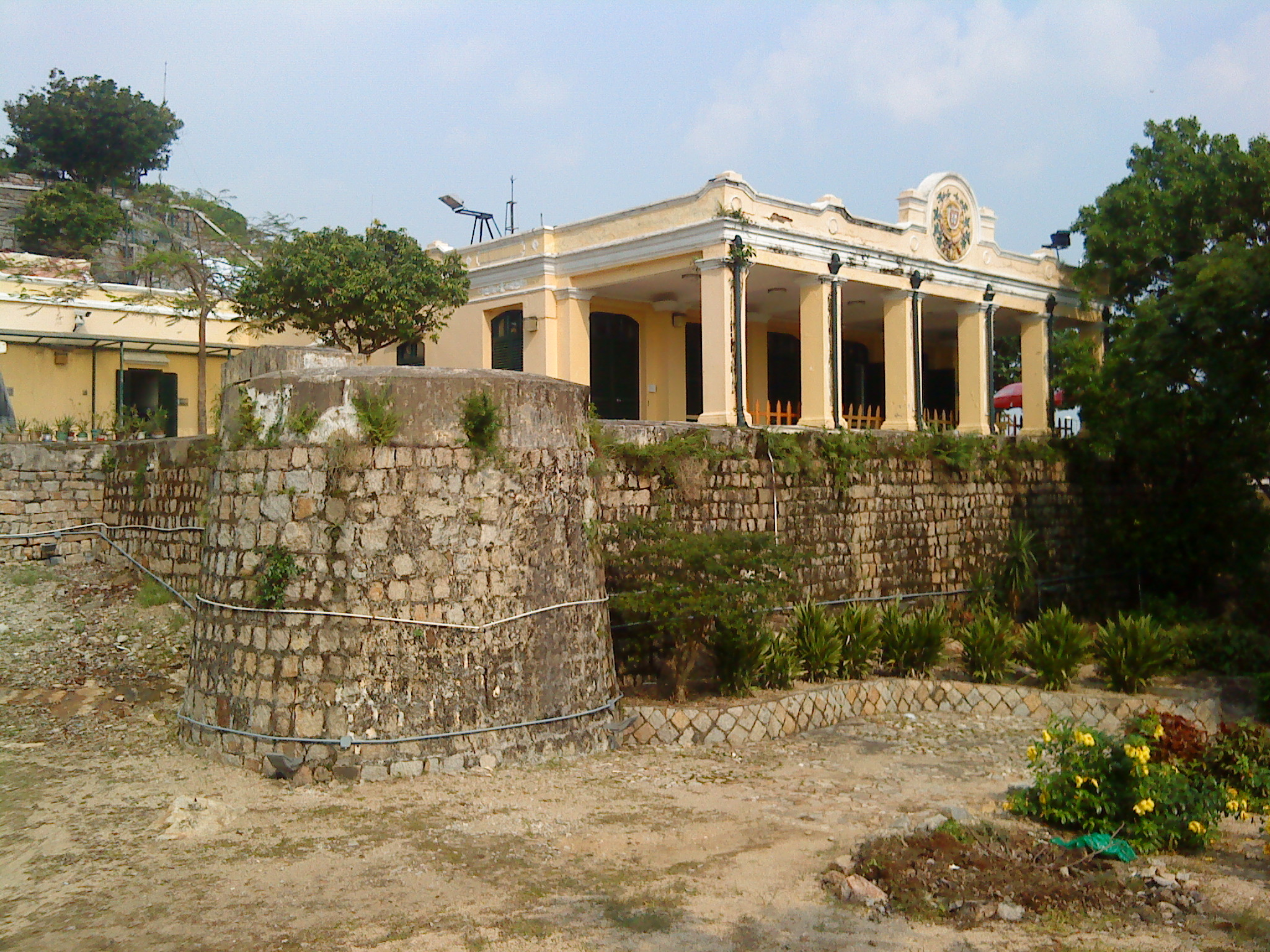
Taipa Fortress

Taipa Fortress (Chinese: 氹仔炮台; Portuguese: Fortaleza da Taipa) is a historical fortress in Northwestern Taipa, Macau, China.

== History ==
The fortress was built in 1846 to defend against pirate attacks. It was later turned into a summer residence for the governor of Macau. The police station of the Municipality of das Ilhas was situated here from 1975 to 1998. Currently, apart from being a garden, it serves as the headquarters for the Macau Scouting Association.

== See also ==
- Fortaleza do Monte
- Mong-Há Fort
- Guia Fortress
- Fort Dona Maria II
- Fort Nossa Senhora do Bom Parto
- Fort São Francisco
- Fort São Tiago da Barra
