= Battle of Macau =

1622 battle of the Dutch-Portuguese War

- Part of the Dutch–Portuguese War and Eighty Years War
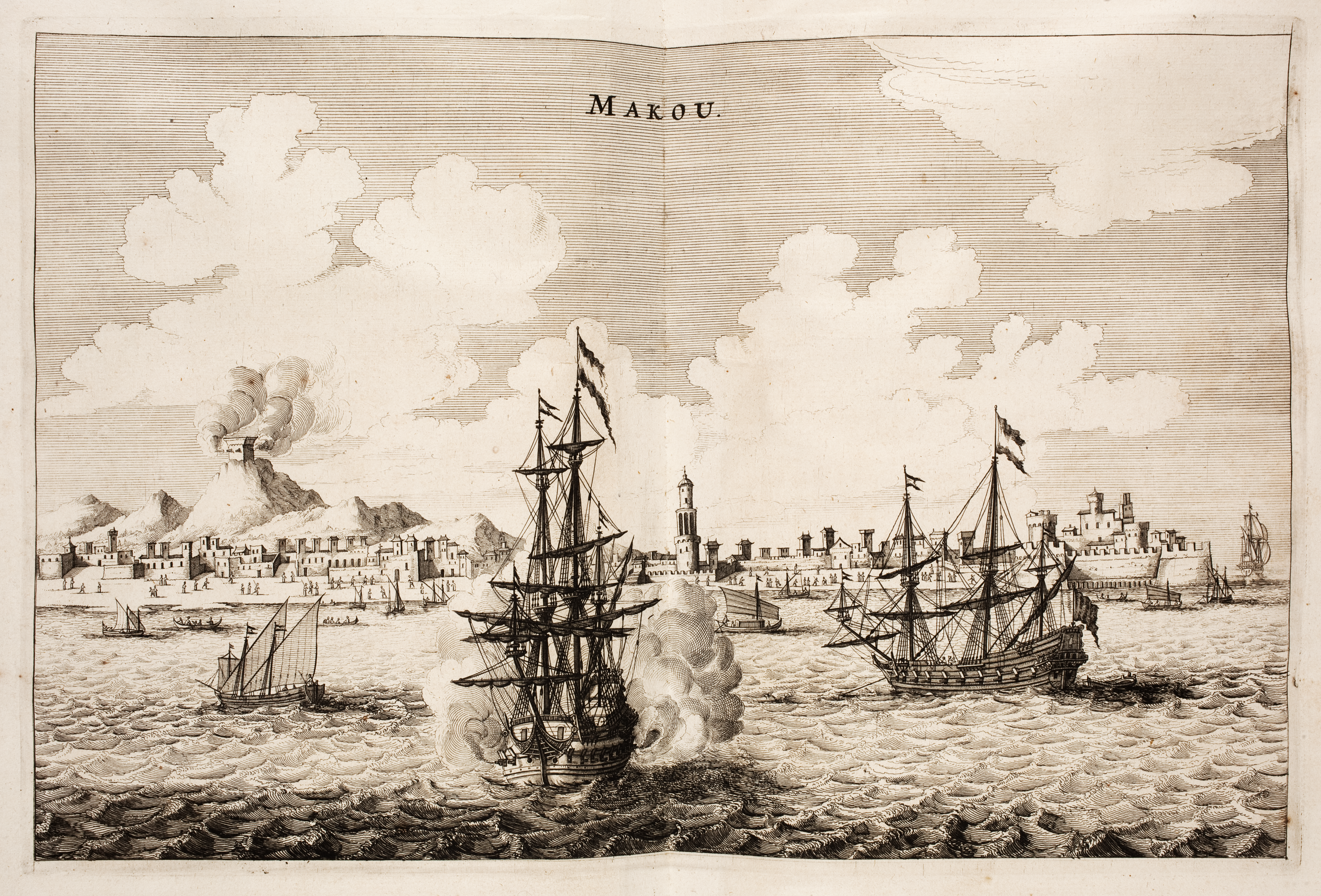
- Dutch ships firing their cannons in the waters of Macau, drawn in 1665
| Date | 22–24 June 1622 |
| Location | Macau |
| Result | Portuguese victory |

Belligerents
| Dutch East India Company | Portuguese Empire; Spanish Empire |

Commanders and leaders
| Cornelis Reijersen; Hans Ruffijn † | Lopo Sarmento de Carvalho |

Strength
| 800; 13 ships | ~150; Unknown number of black slaves |

Casualties and losses
| 300+ killed (136 Dutch); 126 wounded; 4 ships sunk | 6 Iberians killed (4 Portuguese and 2 Castillians); ~20 wounded; Small number of black slaves killed |

The Battle of Macau in 1622 was a conflict of the Dutch–Portuguese War fought in the Portuguese settlement of Macau, in southeastern China. The Portuguese, outnumbered and without adequate fortification, managed to repel the Dutch in a much-celebrated victory on 24 June after a three-day battle. The battle is the only major engagement that was fought primarily between two European powers on the Chinese mainland.

== Background ==
After the Portuguese gained permission from the Ming mandarins in Guangdong to establish a permanent settlement and trade base in Macau in 1557, the port of Macau benefited greatly from being the intermediary of the lucrative China–Japan trade, since the direct routes were banned by the Ming court due to fears of the wokou pirates. Portugal's success in Macau drew the envy of other European maritime powers who were slower to gain a foothold in East Asia. When Philip II of Spain became King of Portugal after the 1580 Portuguese succession crisis, Portuguese colonies came under attack from Spain's enemies, especially the Dutch and the English, who were also hoping to expand their overseas empires.

Macau had encountered the Dutch in 1601, 1603, and 1607, but the Dutch invasion of 1622 represented the first real attempt to capture the city. The Dutchmen, frustrated that their trading post at Hirado was unable to compete with the Portuguese traders at Nagasaki as a result of the latter's easy access to China, hoped that the capture of Macau would grant them a commercial base in China while at the same time depriving the Portuguese of the profitable Macau–Nagasaki route. The fall of Macau would also leave the Spaniards in the Philippines without means of support and make it easier for the Dutch to mount an attack on Manila.

Despite the raids, the Portuguese authorities had not raised an extensive defensive system for the city because of interference by Chinese officials. Macau's defenses in 1622 consisted of a few batteries, one at the west end of the Macau Peninsula (later site of the Fort São Tiago da Barra), and one at each end of the southern bay of Praia Grande (São Francisco on the east and Bom Parto on the west), plus a half-completed Fortaleza do Monte that overlooked the Cathedral of St. Paul.

The sorry state of Macau's defenses became known to the Dutchmen when the Dutch ship Gallias seized a Portuguese ship carrying a case of letters off the coast of Malaya at the end of 1621. Judging by these intercepted letters and information available from Japan, the Governor-General of the Dutch East Indies Jan Pieterszoon Coen considered that Macau was not in a position to resist a serious attack, and set his invasion plan in motion.

Before the invasion, the Portuguese authorities, aware of the territory’s lack of artillery and the imminence of the Dutch attack, sought help from Spanish East Indies in the name of Iberian Union. The Captaincy General of the Philippines answered by sending some pieces of artillery (this was essential in providing cannons for the city's defenses) and one hundred Castilian and Filipino soldiers.

== Expedition to Macau ==
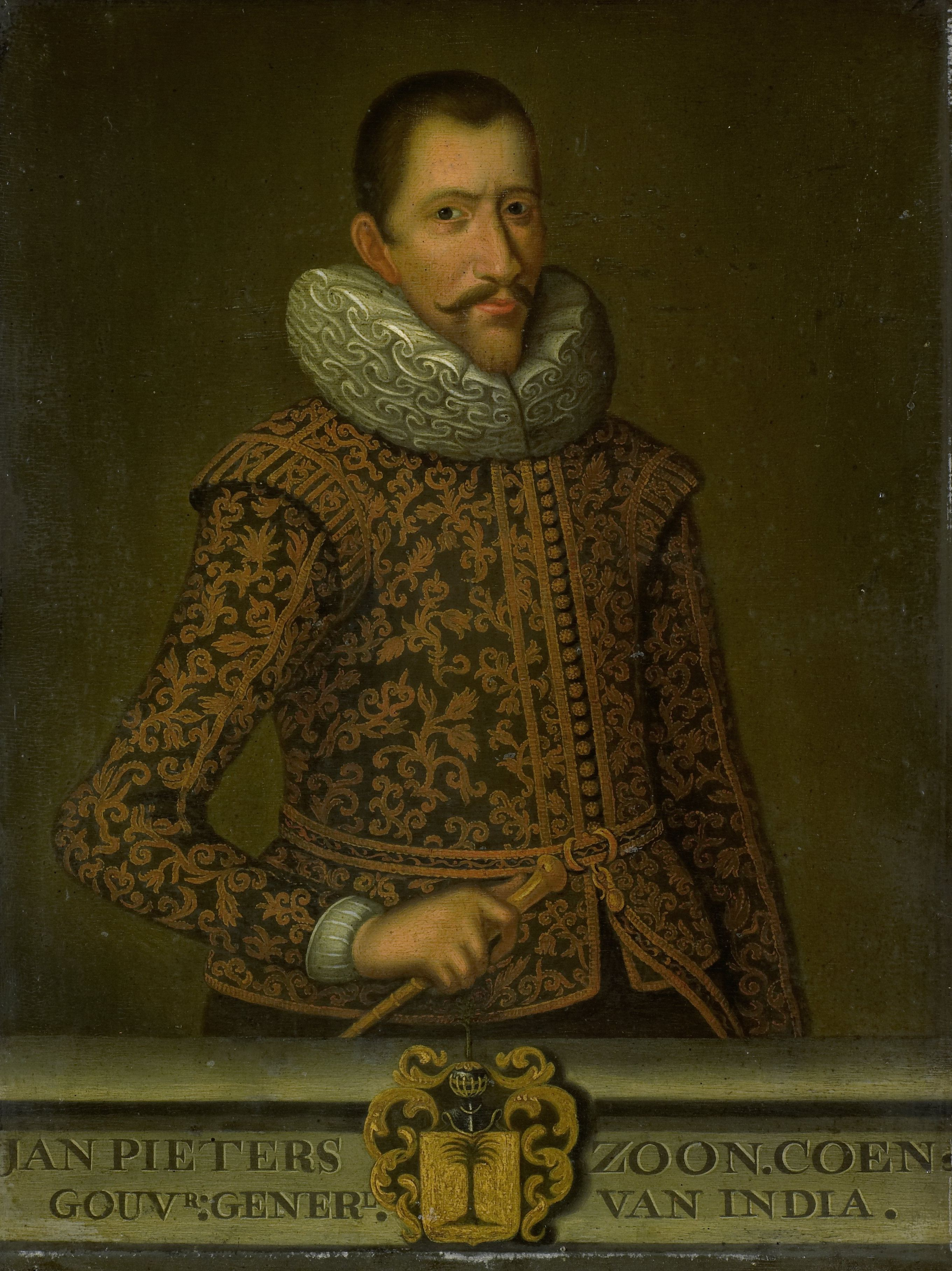
The expedition to Macau and the Pescadores was the brainchild of Dutch Governor-General Jan Pieterszoon Coen

At Batavia, headquarters of the Dutch East India Company (VOC), Coen organized an initial fleet of eight ships for the expedition to Macau, with orders that any Dutch vessel encountered along the way was to be incorporated into the invasion fleet. The soldiers that composed the landing force were specifically selected, and even among the crew there were fewer lascars and Malays than usual; it had been customary for Europeans to carry locals for navigation.

Coen was so satisfied with the fleet that when he wrote to the VOC directors at The Hague he expressed regret for not being able to lead "so magnificent an expedition" in person. The VOC directors did not share Coen's enthusiasm in this venture, stating that they had enough wars at the time, and ordered Coen to wait until they could make a more informed decision. But the fleet, under the command of Cornelis Reijersen, had already left Batavia on 10 April 1622 before the order was sent.

The ultimate goal of the expedition was to establish a Dutch base of operations on the China coast and force the Chinese to trade with the Dutch, so Reijersen was given the option not to attack Macau; he was to form fortifications on the Pescadores regardless of whether he attacked. On 8 June the fleet sailed into Cam Ranh Bay for firewood and water, where it incorporated four Dutch ships encountered off the coast of Indochina and detached a ship with dispatches for William Janszoon, admiral of the Anglo-Dutch Fleet of Defence blockading Manila. So when the fleet set sail again from Cam Ranh Bay two days later, it was composed of eleven ships. A few days later, the fleet encountered a Siamese war junk carrying 28 Siamese and 20 Japanese people. The Japanese asked to join the Dutch expedition, and their request was granted. The landing force now amounted to about six hundred, with some Japanese, Malays, and Bandanese among the numbers.

Coen had previously ordered Admiral Janszoon to detach a few ships from the Manila blockade to join Reijersen's fleet; as a result, two Dutch and two English vessels had waited outside Macau since 29 May. The four ships had tried to disrupt Macau's sea traffic while waiting for the invasion fleet to arrive, but they were unsuccessful in capturing any Portuguese prize, because Macau's leader at the time, Captain-Major of the Japan voyage Lopo Sarmento de Carvalho, had hurriedly fitted seven junks with guns to provide escort.

The invasion fleet arrived in sight of Macau on 21 June and rendezvoused with the four friendly ships there. According to Coen's directives, the English were free to join in maritime operations but were not allowed to take part in the landing or take any share of the spoils of victory. As a result, the English captains refused to commit their ships for the attack. So Reijersen had thirteen ships under his command for the attack on Macau, totaling 1,300 men, including a landing force of 800.

The invasion fleet
| Ship | Tonnage | Complement | Captain | Notes |
|---|---|---|---|---|
| Zierickzee (flagship) | 800 | 221 | Cornelis Reijersen | Initial squadron |
| Groeningen | 700 | 192 | William Bontekoe | Initial squadron |
| Oudt Delft | 700 | 196 | Willem Andriessen | Initial squadron |
| Enchuizen | 500 | 165 | D. Pietersen | Initial squadron |
| Gallias | 220 | 91 | D. Floris | Initial squadron |
| Engelsche Beer | — | 96 | L. Nanning | Initial squadron |
| St. Nicholas | — | 40 | J. Constant | Initial squadron, dispatched to Manila |
| Paliacatta | — | 23 | J. Jacobsen | Initial squadron |
| Haan | — | — | Dirck Velling | Incorporated in Indochina |
| Tiger | — | — | — | Incorporated in Indochina |
| Victoria | — | — | — | Incorporated in Indochina |
| Santa Cruz | — | — | — | Incorporated in Indochina |
| Trouw | — | — | — | Detached from Manila |
| Hoop | — | — | — | Detached from Manila |
| Palsgrave | — | — | — | Detached from Manila; did not participate in attack on Macau |
| Bull | — | — | — | Detached from Manila; did not participate in attack on Macau |

== Battle ==
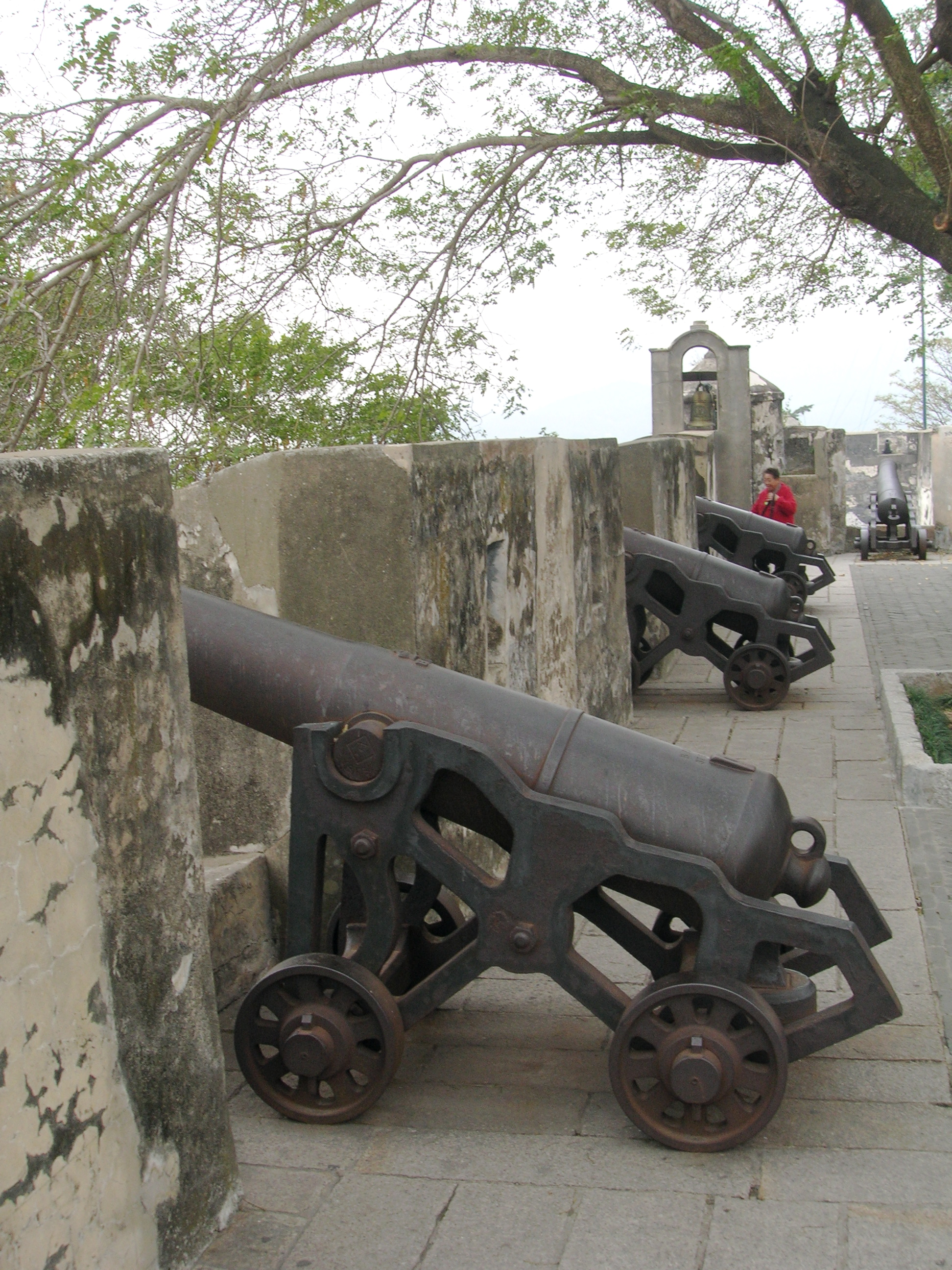
The cannons of Fortaleza do Monte

On the night of 22 June Reijersen sent ashore a scouting party of three men and a Chinese guide to see if the 10,000 Chinese residents of the city would remain neutral. They soon returned after finding the Chinese had fled the city ahead of the invasion. The following morning, Reijersen himself boarded a launch with some senior officers to scout for a suitable landing site. It was decided that the invading army would make their landing on the eastern Cacilhas Beach (劏狗環) the next day, 24 June.

To distract the defenders from the intended landing site, three ships – Groeningen, Gallias, and Engelsche Beer – started to bombard the São Francisco battery in the south on 23 June. After an afternoon of cannon volleys and insults (where Dutch seamen threatened to rape Macau's women after killing all men above twenty), the ships withdrew for the night without inflicting any casualties on the Portuguese side. Nonetheless, the Dutch celebrated their expected victory in advance by blowing their trumpets and beating their drums all night. The Portuguese responded with similar martial festivities in the city's bulwarks.

Macau was inadequately fortified and short of fighting men. The Dutch fleet arrived while most of Macau's citizens were in Canton buying goods for the annual Japan trade; furthermore, the Ming emperor had requisitioned able-bodied men and cannons from Macau to fight the Manchu conquest of China in October 1621. Portuguese records estimate that there were only 50 musketeers and 100 residents capable of bearing arms. Lopo Sarmento de Carvalho fully understood that the Dutch would land the next day, so he spent the night inspecting the fortifications and rallying his men to fight to the last.

The Dutch ships Groeningen and Gallias resumed their attack on São Francisco at daybreak on 24 June, the Feast-day of St. John the Baptist. The Portuguese gunners at the bastion responded with such ferocity that they badly damaged the Gallias, which had to be scuttled a few weeks later.

At approximately two hours after sunrise, the landing party of 800 set off for Cacilhas Beach while São Francisco was being bombarded. The amphibious assault included 32 launches equipped with swivel guns and 5 barges, supported by the gunfire from two ships. Also, a barrel of damp gunpowder was fired into the wind so that the Dutch could land under the cover of smoke in what has been suggested as one of the first recorded instances of the tactical use of a smoke screen.

About 60 Portuguese and 90 "filhos da terra" entrenched at the beach under the command of António Rodrigues Cavalhino gave some initial resistance by shooting into the smoke, killing 40 and wounding Admiral Reijersen in the belly, taking him out of action. Captain Hans Ruffijn took command of the landing force and speedily overran the entrenchment, forcing Cavalhino to pull back, after which the rest of the landing force disembarked without opposition. The beachhead now secure, Ruffijn left two companies at the beach as rear-guard and advanced into the city with 600 men, fighting skirmishes with Cavalhino's retreating men along the way.

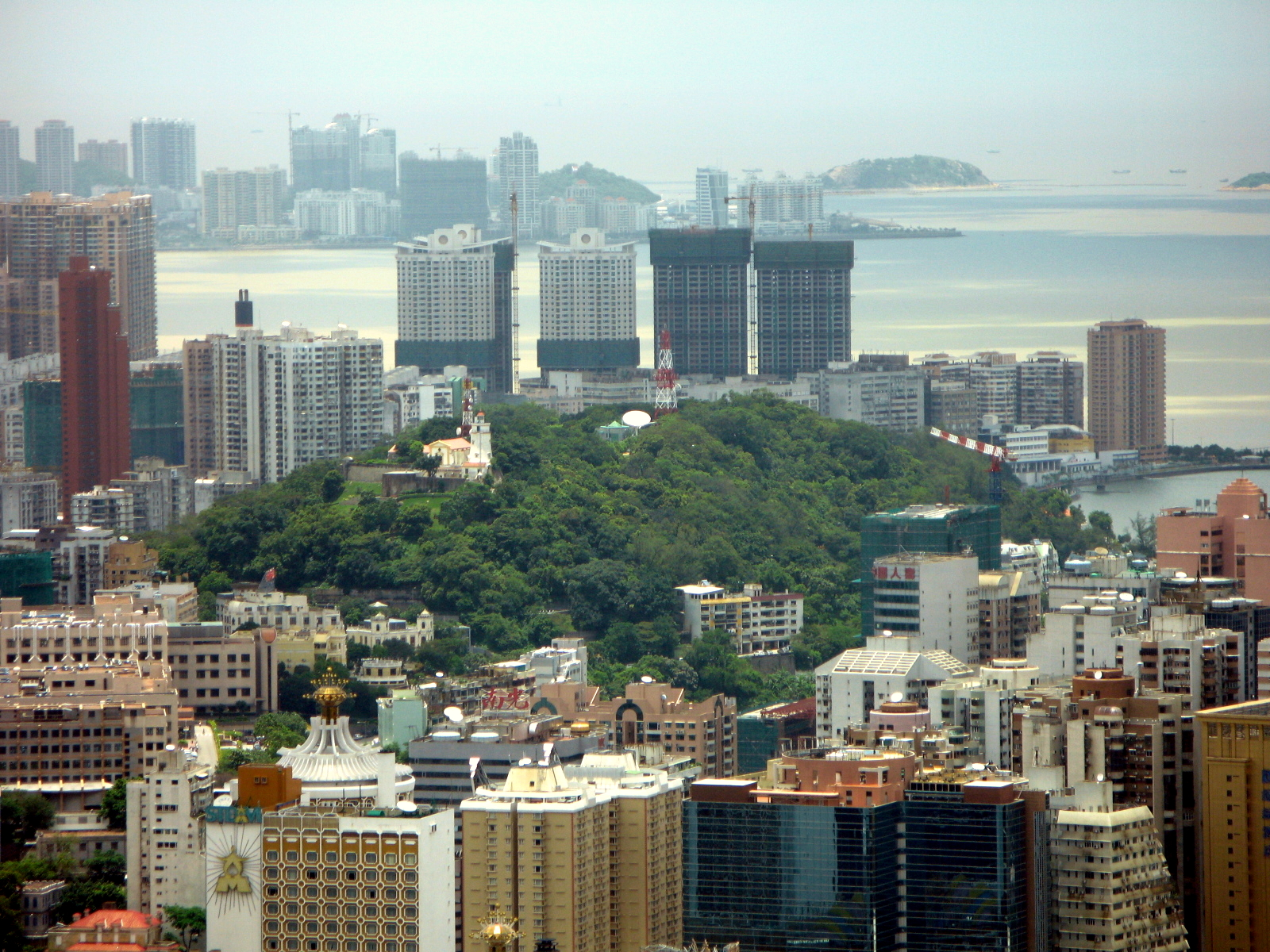
The Guia Hill (2008)

The Dutch marched toward the centre of the city in orderly fashion until reaching the artillery range of the Fortaleza do Monte, where they came under heavy bombardment by a varied mosaic of militiamen, including retired Portuguese soldiers from the State of India who had married and settled in Macau, Eurasian traders and their domestic servants, local and maritime Chinese, Spanish merchants and their Tagalog helpers, and hundreds of African slaves from Portuguese Mozambique. When the invaders passed by a small spring called Fontinha, the Dutch ammunition cache exploded in their midst, causing many casualties. Portuguese records attribute the cause of the explosion to the Jesuit priest Giacomo Rho, who is said to have fired a cannon-shot from the Fortaleza do Monte at the Dutch. The Swiss mercenary Elie Ripon, writing from first-hand experience on the ground in service of the Dutch, instead says the explosion was caused by a clumsy Japanese who accidentally set fire to the gunpowder while replenishing his munitions.

The Dutch commanders halted the advance to deliberate their next steps. They decided to climb Guia Hill, upon which a hermitage was situated, to get a better view of the enemy, but their ascent was resisted by a party of 30 Macanese and blacks, whose ferocity and effective use of terrain forced the Dutch to turn back. The invaders moved toward a patch of high ground near the Guia Hill, with the intention of retreating for the day due to fatigue and low ammunition (most was lost in the explosion).

By then it had become apparent to the Portuguese that the main Dutch force was attacking from the east and that the bombardment of São Francisco was just a feint. The commander of the São Thiago garrison therefore sent 50 men under Captain João Soares Vivas to aid the inland defense.

When the Portuguese realized the Dutch intentions, the defenders occupied the high ground ahead of the Dutch. With the battle cry "Santiago!", Lopo Sarmento de Carvalho signaled the counterattack, and the combined forces of the Portuguese defenders, Macanese citizens, Dominican friars, Jesuit priests, and black slaves charged the enemy, forcing the Dutchmen to retreat.

Captain Hans Ruffijn urged his countrymen to stand fast, but he was killed in the fighting as the Dutch retreat turned into a rout. The onset of the "drunken negro slaves" in particular, sparing no one as they beheaded all Dutchmen they came across in the name of John the Baptist, greatly demoralized the Hollanders. One black woman was even compared to the legendary Brites de Almeida by a contemporary Jesuit for her incredible skill with a halberd during the battle. However, the Dutch got some reprieve in the pursuit when the slaves abandoned the chase to plunder the dead.

When the fleeing Dutchmen reached the Cacilhas Beach, the two rear-guard companies who were supposed to cover the retreat panicked and fled to the boats without firing a shot. The panic among the Dutch landing party was so complete that the Dutch ships had to push off into deeper water to avoid being overturned by the fugitives, causing many of them to drown or be shot by the Portuguese in the sea. The next day, Admiral Reijersen sent ashore a flag of truce to negotiate the release of prisoners. The negotiation was in vain, and the dejected Dutch fleet soon left Macau waters to head for the Pescadores.

== Aftermath ==
The battle was the most decisive defeat ever dealt by the Portuguese to the Dutch in the Far East, as the losses of the attackers far outweighed those of the defenders. The lowest Portuguese estimate claims they had killed over three hundred of their enemies on that day, while most Portuguese cite six or eight hundred as the total number killed. The official Dutch tally lists the number of deaths at 136 and wounded at 126, without taking the Bandanese and Japanese mercenaries into account. Historian C. R. Boxer suggests that the actual death toll might well be around three hundred if the Bandanese and Japanese dead were counted.

Casualties among Dutch officers were especially serious, as seven captains, four lieutenants, and seven ensigns were lost in the battle. In addition to the loss of personnel, the Dutch also lost all their cannons, flags, and equipment. In comparison, the deaths on the Portuguese side numbered only four Portuguese, two Spaniards, and a few slaves; about twenty were wounded. At Batavia, Jan Pieterszoon Coen was extremely bitter about the outcome of the battle, writing "in this shameful manner we lost most of our best men in this fleet together with most of the weapons."

As for the Portuguese defense, Coen had this to say: "The Portuguese beat us off from Macau with their slaves; it was not done with any soldiers, for there are none in Macau". Coen continued his analysis "See how the enemy thus holds his possessions so cheaply whilst we squander ourselves". He also reckoned "The slaves of the Portuguese at Macau served them so well and faithfully, that it was they who defeated and drove away our people there last year", and "Our people saw very few Portuguese" during the battle. Coen would from there on advocate for the employment of slaves for warfare in preference to Dutch soldiers.

While the Portuguese didn't give the blacks primary credit for the victory, they nonetheless appreciated the bravery shown by the slaves so much that many slaves were freed on the battlefield immediately after the victory. When minor Chinese officials took the heads of the slain Dutchmen to Canton as proof of Portuguese service in defending Chinese territory, they apparently relayed stories of the blacks' bravery as well, causing the impressed Provincial Admiral (海道副使; referred in European sources as haitao) to send a gift of 200 piculs of rice to be distributed among them. Historians consider that the Mozambican slaves were fundamental in the Portuguese victory, as there was a limited number of local Portuguese and Eurasian Macanese, which were trading in Canton or were recruited by the Chinese emperor to fight the Manchu invasion.

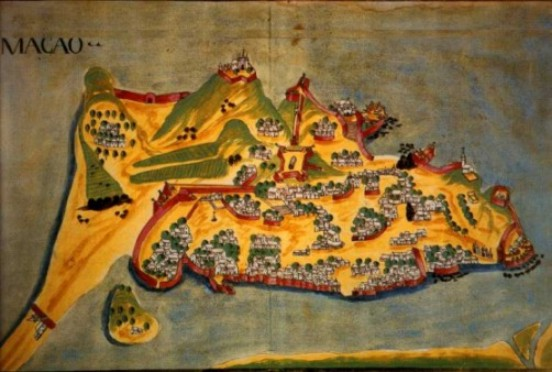
Map of Macau Peninsula in 1639, the city now reinforced with walls and forts

After the attempted Dutch invasion the Portuguese authorities in Goa realized the importance of having a permanent paramount figure of authority in Macau, and began sending a proper governor to Macau, beginning in 1623. Before, this small town was administered by the Captain-Major of the Japan Voyage, a position that was auctioned off in the Lisbon court to the highest bidder annually and not expected to govern Macau after he had left for Japan.

With the new arrangement the Captain-Major's authority was limited to the merchant fleet to Japan, and lost all privileges he might have had in Macau to the Governor of Macau. The first governor, Francisco Mascarenhas, under orders from Goa, enhanced the fortifications to defend against a repetition of the Dutch attack, having bribed the Guangdong provincial authorities to turn a blind eye to the constructions.

Later in 1622 when the Dutch fleet arrived in the Pescadores, the place that Coen believed to be better than Macau from a strategic viewpoint, Admiral Reijersen built a fort there and carried out Coen's orders to indiscriminately attack Chinese ships, to coerce the Chinese authorities into allowing trade. It was hoped that if this harassment campaign succeeded, the Pescadores might supplant Macau and Manila as a silk entrepôt for the Japan market.

However, the Chinese started to regard the Hollanders as pirates and murderers because of these raids and the attack on Macau, and refused to trade with them. The Chinese then waged war against the Dutch and defeated them during the Sino–Dutch conflicts from 1623 to 1624, forcing the Dutch to abandon the Pescadores in 1624 for Taiwan. At that point, the Chinese began to consider the Dutch offer for trade. In the two years in between, Macau had reaped the benefits of increased trade.

The Spanish Empire shortly after occupied Taiwan and stablished the colony of Spanish Formosa to protect Iberian Union domains in East Asia (Portuguese Macau and Spanish Philippines) from future Dutch or English attacks.

The successful defense of Macau meant that Portugal could still control the trade between China and Japan, by then the only profitable trade for the declining Portuguese power. Though this situation ended when Japan expelled all Portuguese in 1639, and Portuguese Malacca fell to the Dutch in 1641, Macau remained under Portuguese control until 1999.

== Commemoration ==
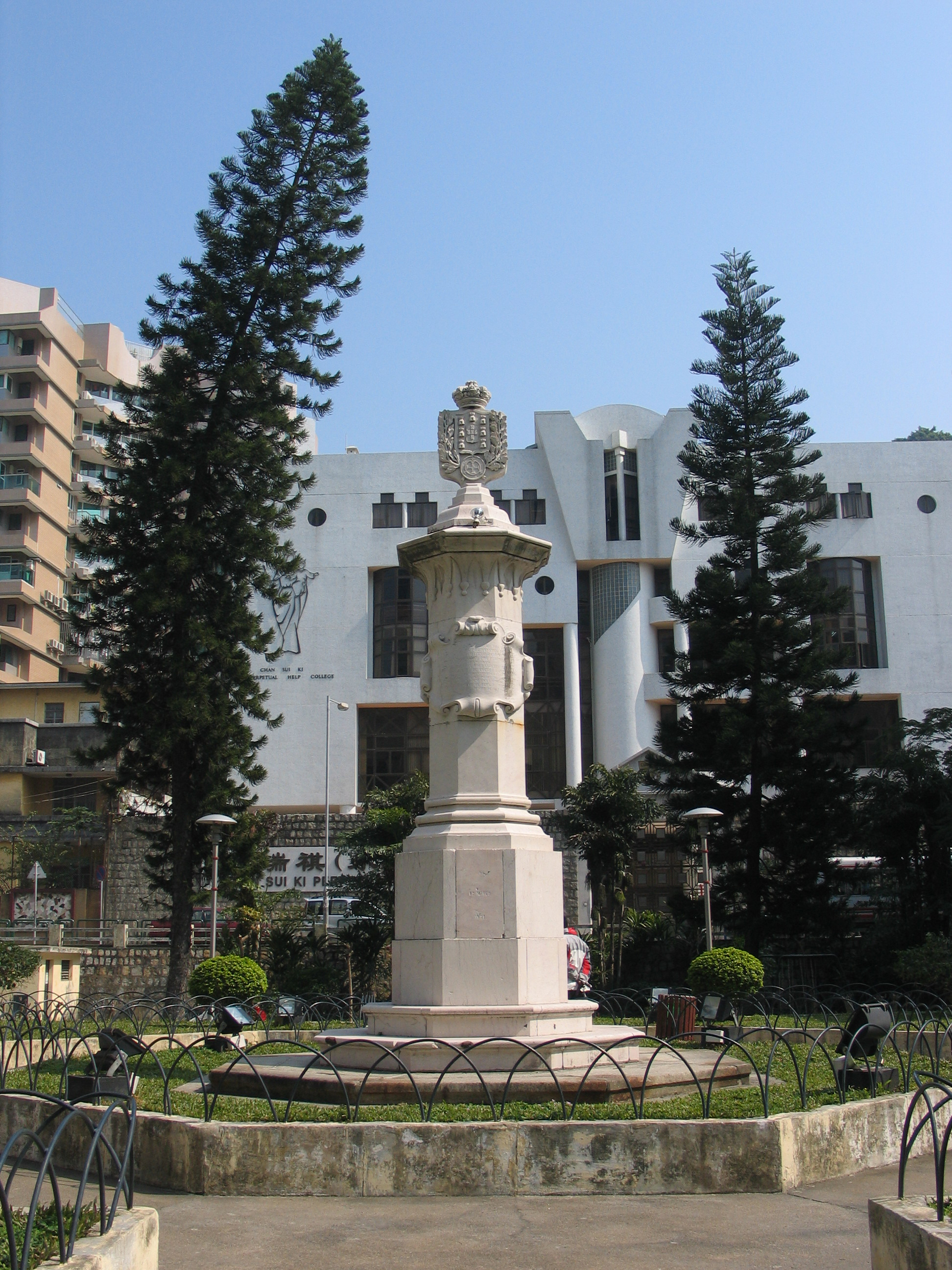
Victory Garden, a park in Macau with a monument commemorating the battle.

Being a great victory for the Portuguese in Macau, the battle was commemorated in a number of ways. When the English traveler Peter Mundy arrived in Macau in 1637, he described a children's dance which depicted a "battaille betweene the Portugalls and the Dutch... where the Dutch were overcome, butt withoutt any reproachfull speeche or Disgracefull action to thatt Nation." Also, after the victory, the residents of Macau began to celebrate on 24 June as the City Day to commemorate the victory. This day was a public holiday on the Macau Peninsula and was observed every year until the handover of Macau to China in 1999.

In 1871 a monument of the battle was erected in the Victory Garden.

== See also ==
- El Piñal – A Spanish settlement adjacent to Portuguese Macau, the establishment of which in 1598 caused a naval battle between Spain and Portugal in 1600.
