= Victory Garden, Macau =

Park in São Lázaro, Macau

Coordinates: 22.198655°N 113.548747°E

Victory Garden
- Chinese: 得勝花園; Portuguese: Jardim da Vitória
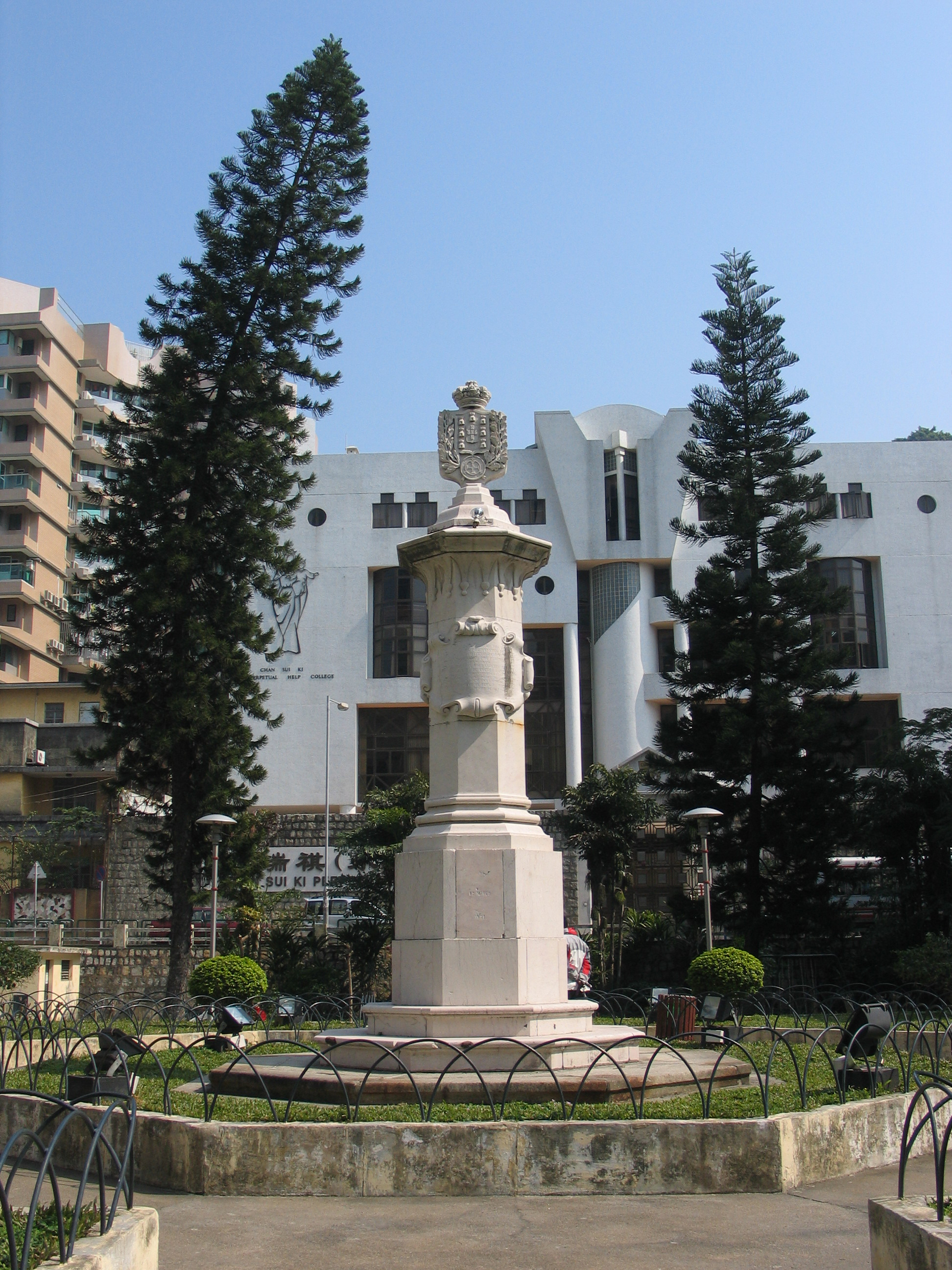
- Interactive map of Victory Garden
- Type: Garden
- Location: São Lázaro, Macau, China

Victory Garden, Macau

Chinese name
- Traditional Chinese: 得勝花園
- Simplified Chinese: 得胜花园
Transcriptions
Standard Mandarin
- Hanyu Pinyin: Déshèng Huāyuán
Yue: Cantonese
- Jyutping: dak1 sing3 faa1 jyun4*2

Portuguese name
- Portuguese: Jardim da Vitória

Victory Garden (Chinese: 得勝花園; Portuguese: Jardim da Vitória) is a park in São Lázaro, Macau. The park was built to commemorate the victory by the Portuguese over the Dutch in 1622.

The park features a statute commemorating the historic event, a tree, benches and flowers that line the pathways from Avenida de Sidónio Pais.

== See also ==
- List of tourist attractions in Macau
