= Former Court Building, Macau =

Courthouse in Macau, China

Coordinates: 22.192°N 113.540°E

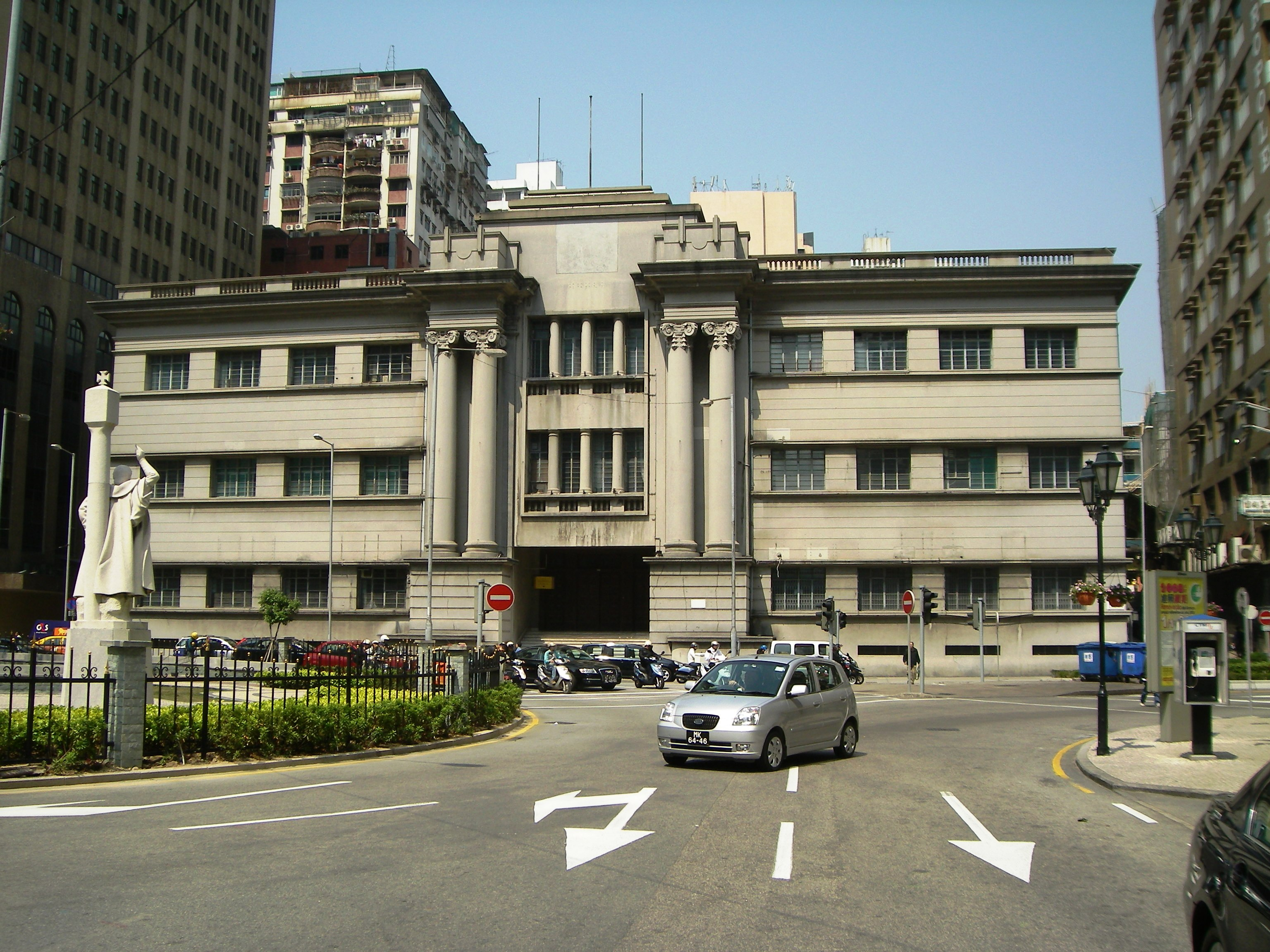
The former court building along Avenida da Praia Grande in Macau

The Former Court Building, or Old Court Building, is a former courthouse located at 459 Avenida da Praia Grande in Macau.

Built in 1951, the building was used as offices for the Portuguese colonial government, including the Judiciary Police headquarters, and then as a courthouse. It has been designated as a structure of importance.

Plans to convert the building for use as the new Macao Central Library were axed in 2020. Instead, the building is now planned to house the Court of Final Appeal.

== See also ==
- Superior Court of Macau Building
