= Fort Nossa Senhora do Bom Parto =

- Forte de Nossa Senhora do Bom Parto
- Macau in China
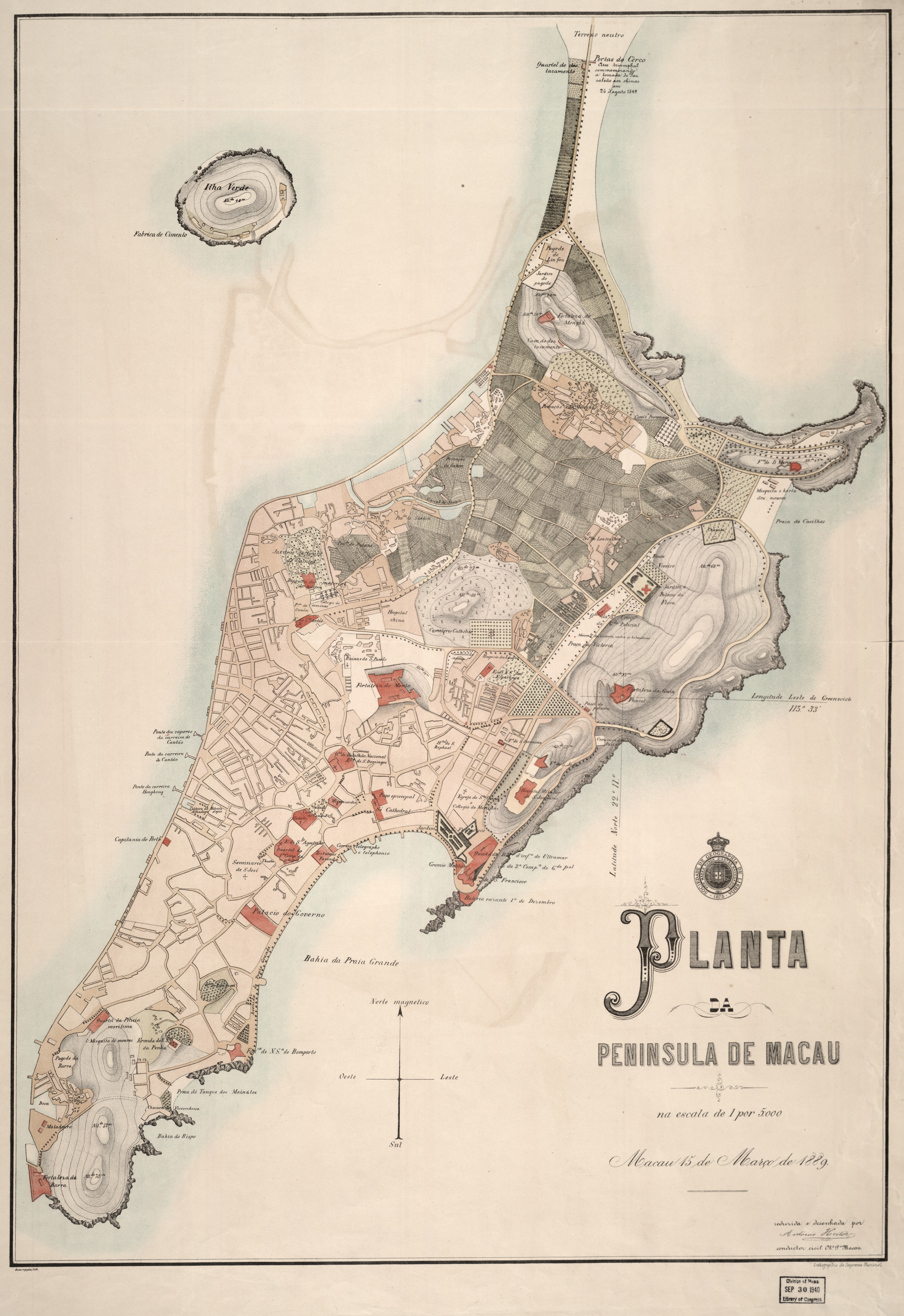
- 1889 Portuguese map of Macau, where Fort. de N.S. do Bomparto can be seen to the southwest of Praia Grande.

Site information
- Controlled by: Portuguese Empire; China
- Condition: Ruins

Location
- Coordinates: 22.1863°N 113.5370°E

Site history
- Built: 1608-1615
- Built by: Portugal

The Fort Nossa Senhora do Bom Parto (Forte da Nossa Senhora do Bom Parto in Portuguese) is a former fort of the Portuguese Empire located in Penha Hill in Macau, China.

It was among the first forts built by the Portuguese in Macau, erected between 1608 and 1615. It participated in the defense of Macau when the Dutch East India Company attacked city during the Battle of Macau in 1622. It was erected on grounds owned by Augustinian friars. It defended thesouthern coast of Macau together with the Fort São Francisco and the Battery of São Pedro (demolished in the 1930s) and the Inner Harbour together with the Fort São Tiago da Barra. It was rebuilt in 1775 (during the reign of the Qianlong Emperor of the Qing dynasty) and eight cannon were installed there.

Abandoned in 1892, it was subsequently incorporated in the Hotel Bela Vista, and currently part of the official residence of the General Consul of Portugal in Macau and Hong Kong.

It is currently a classified monument by the government of Macau.

== See also ==
- Portuguese Macau
