= Lou Kau Mansion =

Former mansion in Sé, Macau, China

- 盧家大屋; Casa de Lou Kau
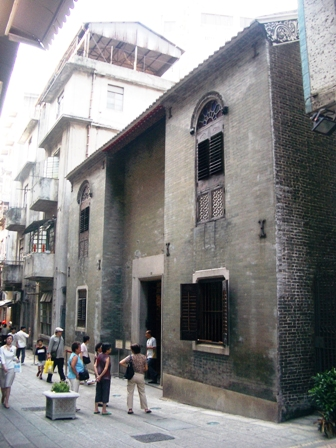
- Interactive map of the Lou Kau Mansion area

General information
- Type: former house
- Location: Sé, Macau, China
- Coordinates: 22°11′39.2″N 113°32′28.4″E
- Completed: 1889

Lou Kau Mansion
- Traditional Chinese: 盧家大屋
- Simplified Chinese: 卢家大屋
Transcriptions
Yue: Cantonese
- Jyutping: lou4 gaa1 daai6 uk1

The Lou Kau Mansion (Chinese: 盧家大屋; Portuguese: Casa de Lou Kau) is a historical house in Sé, Macau, China. Built in 1889, the mansion is one of the designated historical sites in the Historic Centre of Macau, a UNESCO World Heritage Site.

== History ==
The building was built around 1889 as a home of Lou Kau, a prominent Chinese merchant. The building has been listed as part of the historic center of Macau and a protected property in 1992. In 2002, the Macau Bureau of Culture started the maintenance for the building and was eventually opened to the public in 2005.

== Architecture ==
The building was built with Portuguese decoration and Chinese architecture style. The blue-bricked building consists of two-story. It has also three courtyards.

== Activities ==
The building regularly hosts small-scale concerts of the Macau Chinese Orchestra.

== See also ==
- List of tourist attractions in Macau
