= Macau Military Club =

Restaurant in Sé, Macau, China

- 澳門陸軍俱樂部; Clube Militar de Macau
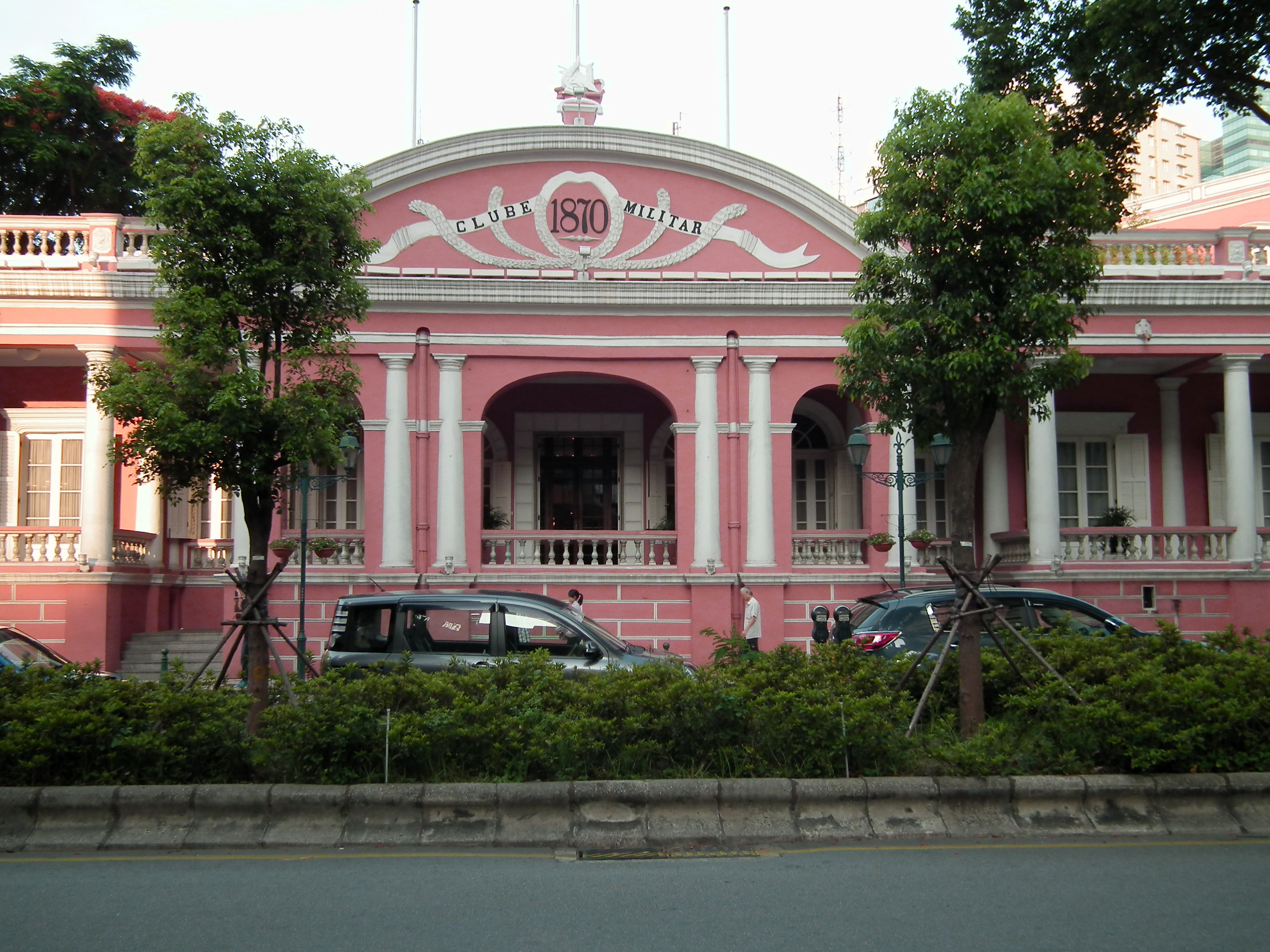
- Interactive map of the Macau Military Club area

General information
- Type: club, restaurant
- Location: Sé, Macau, China
- Coordinates: 22°11′29.8″N 113°32′39.5″E
- Completed: 1870

The Macau Military Club (traditional Chinese: 澳門陸軍俱樂部; simplified Chinese: 澳门陆军俱乐部; pinyin: Àomén Lùjūn Jùlèbù; Portuguese: Clube Militar de Macau) is a club and restaurant in Sé, Macau, China.

== History ==
The building was originally constructed in 1870 as a private military club. The building was restored in 1995 and reopened as a restaurant.

== Events ==
The club regularly hosts various exhibitions.

== See also ==
- List of tourist attractions in Macau
- Macau Garrison
