= Moorish Barracks =

Former barracks in São Lourenço, Macau, China

Coordinates: 22°11′14.6″N 113°31′57.3″E

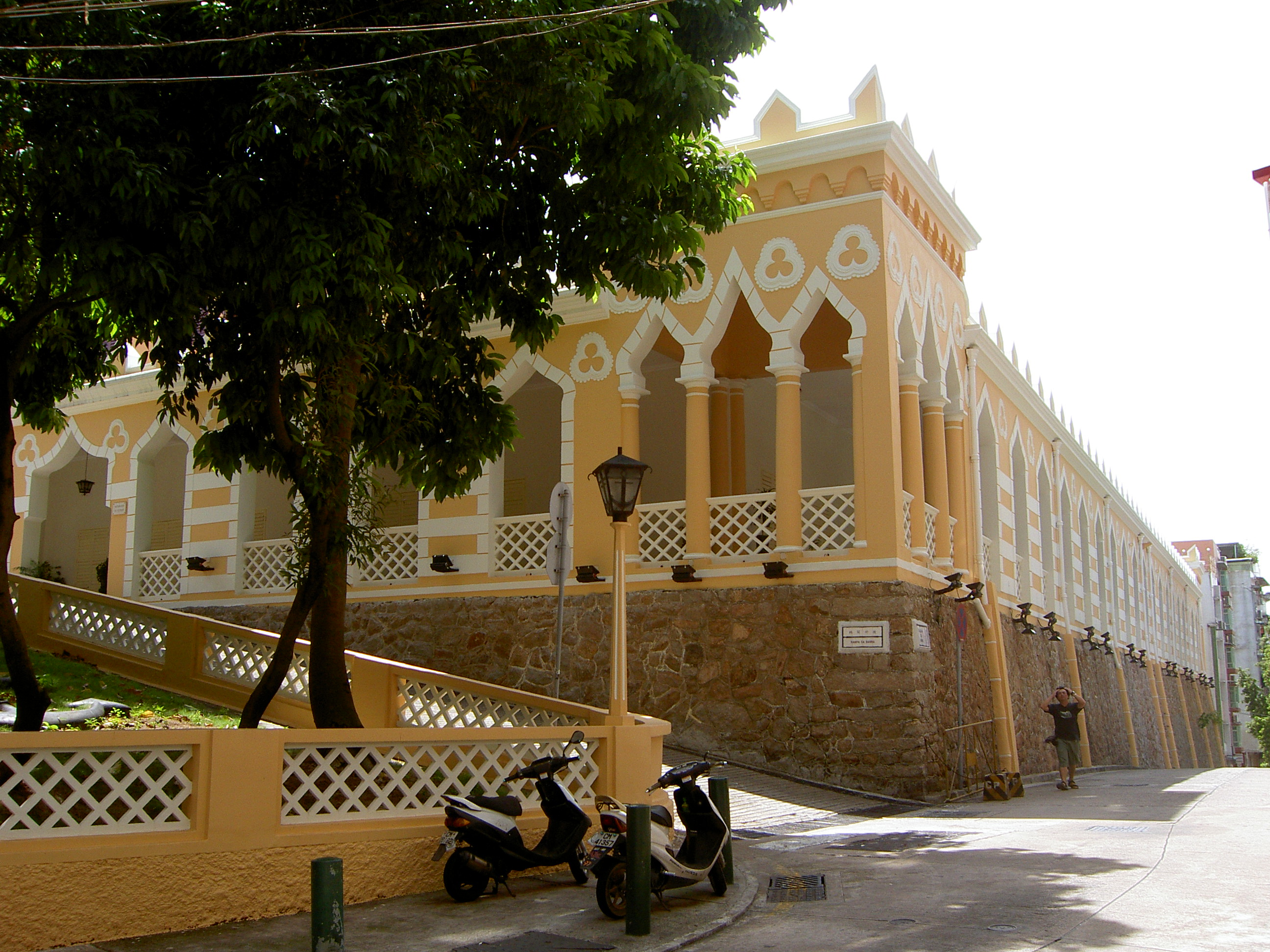
- Interactive map of the Moorish Barracks area

General information
- Type: office
- Location: São Lourenço, Macau, China
- Completed: 1874

Moorish Barracks

Chinese name
- Traditional Chinese: 港務局大樓
- Simplified Chinese: 港务局大楼
Transcriptions
Standard Mandarin
- Hanyu Pinyin: Gǎngwùjú Dàlóu
Yue: Cantonese
- Jyutping: gong2 mou6 guk6 daai6 lau4

Portuguese name
- Portuguese: Edifício da Capitania dos Portos

The Moorish Barracks (Portuguese: Quartel dos Mouros; Chinese: 摩爾兵營), also known as the Port Authority Building (Portuguese: Edifício da Capitania dos Portos; Chinese: 港務局大樓), is a historical barracks in São Lourenço, Macau, China. It currently serves as the headquarters of the Marine and Water Bureau.

In 2005, the barracks became of the designated historical sites of the Historic Centre of Macau, a UNESCO World Heritage Site.

== History ==
The barracks was built in August 1874 to accommodate a regiment from Goa, Portuguese India. It was designed by an Italian architect. In 1905, it was turned into the headquarters of Macau Port Authority. The building now houses the headquarters of the Marine and Water Bureau.

== Architecture ==
The barracks is built with bricks and neo-classical structure on the slope of Barra Hill. It has Mughal architecture with 67.5 meters length and 37 meters width. The rear side of the building consists of two stories and the other part of the building consists of one story. The exterior of the building is painted in yellow and white.

== See also ==
- List of tourist attractions in Macau
