= Fortaleza do Monte =

Fort in Santo António, Macau, China

Coordinates: 22°11′49″N 113°32′32″E

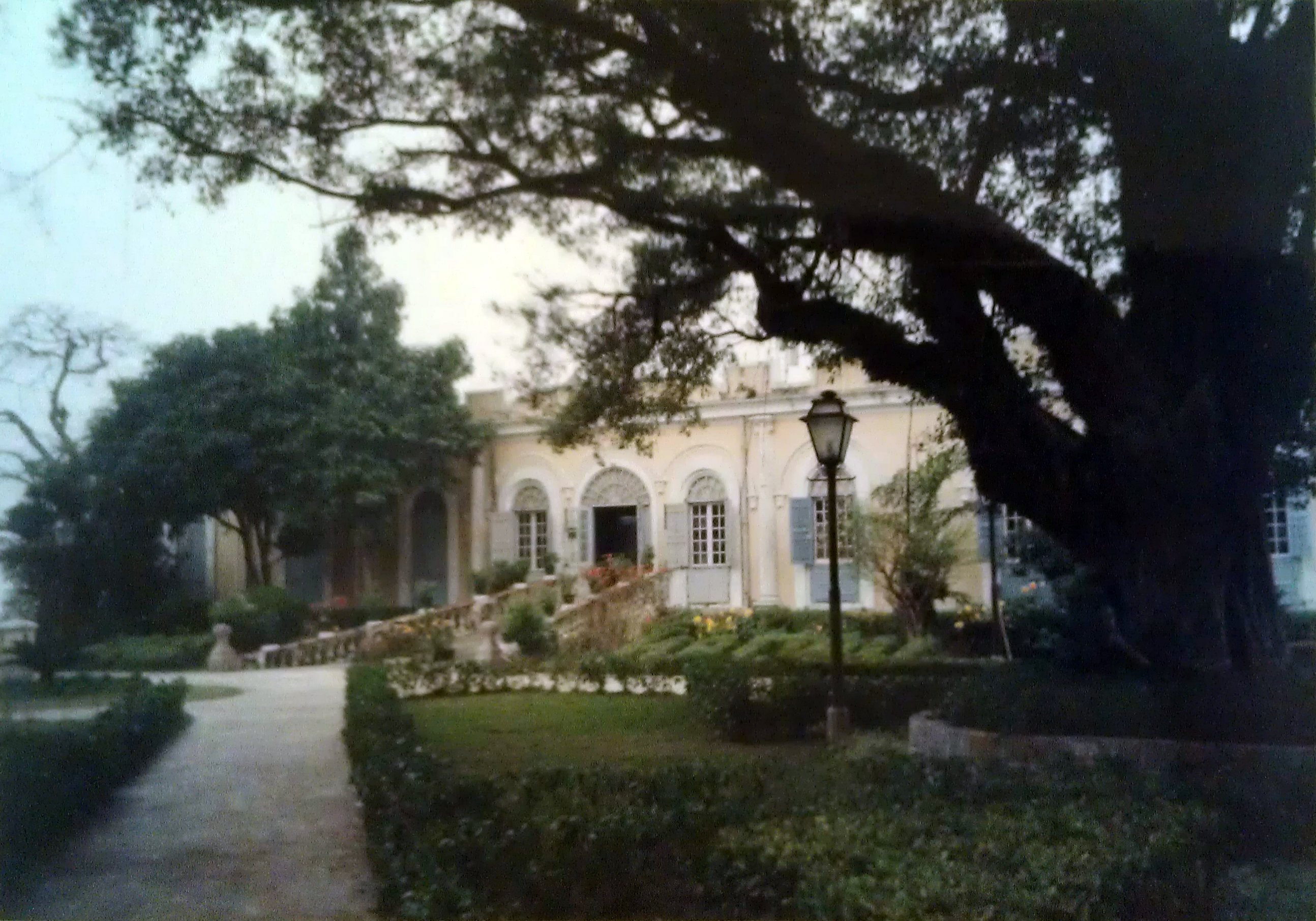

Chinese name
- Traditional Chinese: 大砲台
- Simplified Chinese: 大炮台
- Literal meaning: Big Fortress
Transcriptions
Standard Mandarin
- Hanyu Pinyin: Dà Pàotái
Yue: Cantonese
- Jyutping: daai6 paau3 toi4

Portuguese name
- Portuguese: Fortaleza de Nossa Senhora do Monte de São Paulo

Map

The Fortaleza do Monte (Portuguese for Mount Fortress, also Monte Forte; officially Fortaleza de Nossa Senhora do Monte de São Paulo, in English: Fortress of Our Lady of the Mount of St. Paul; Chinese: 大砲台; Jyutping: daai6 paau3 toi4) is a fort in Santo António in Macau. It is the historical military centre of Macau. The fort forms part of the "Historic Centre of Macau" and is a UNESCO World Heritage Site.

The fort was built between 1617 and 1626 on the 52-metre tall Mount Hill, located directly east of the Ruins of Saint Paul's. It was constructed to protect the properties of the Jesuits (mainly Portuguese Jesuits) in Macau, especially from pirates. Later, the fort was taken over by Francisco Mascarenhas, the first governor of Macau, as the governor's residence.

The fort occupies an area of roughly 8,000 square metres. Thirty-two muzzle-loading cannon were placed around the fort's walls, and the two corners of the southeastern fort wall have small watchtowers. The fort proved crucial in successfully holding off the attempted Dutch invasion of Macau in 1622.

The fort remained a restricted military area until 1965 when the barracks in the fort were converted into a weather observatory and the fort was opened to the public. The observatory ceased its function and was relocated to Taipa in 1996 before it was demolished to make way for the Museum of Macau, which was officially opened on 19 April 1998. The tree-covered park at the top of the fort has a panoramic view of the mainland area of Macau.

Apart from being a fortress, it has served various functions:

- The first residence of the governors of Macau (from 1623 to 1749).
- The base for two companies of the Portuguese Prince Regent Battalion to act as a police force from 1810 to 1841.
- A weather observatory of the Meteorological Department of Portuguese Macau (from 1966 to 1996).
- The Museum of Macau (1998 to present).

== Gallery ==
Fortaleza do Monte, Macau

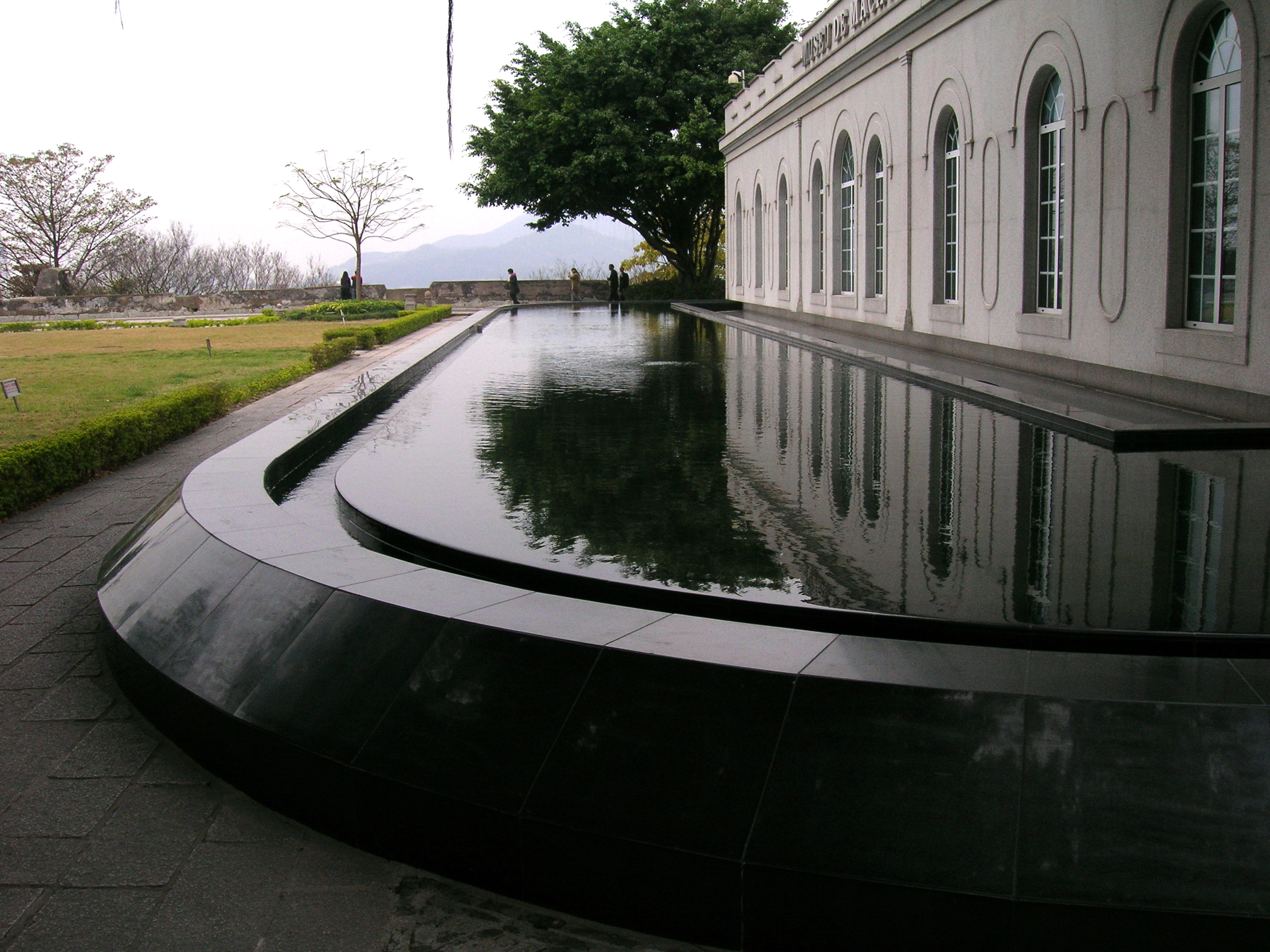
A reflecting pool by the main fortress building (the site of the Museum of Macau).

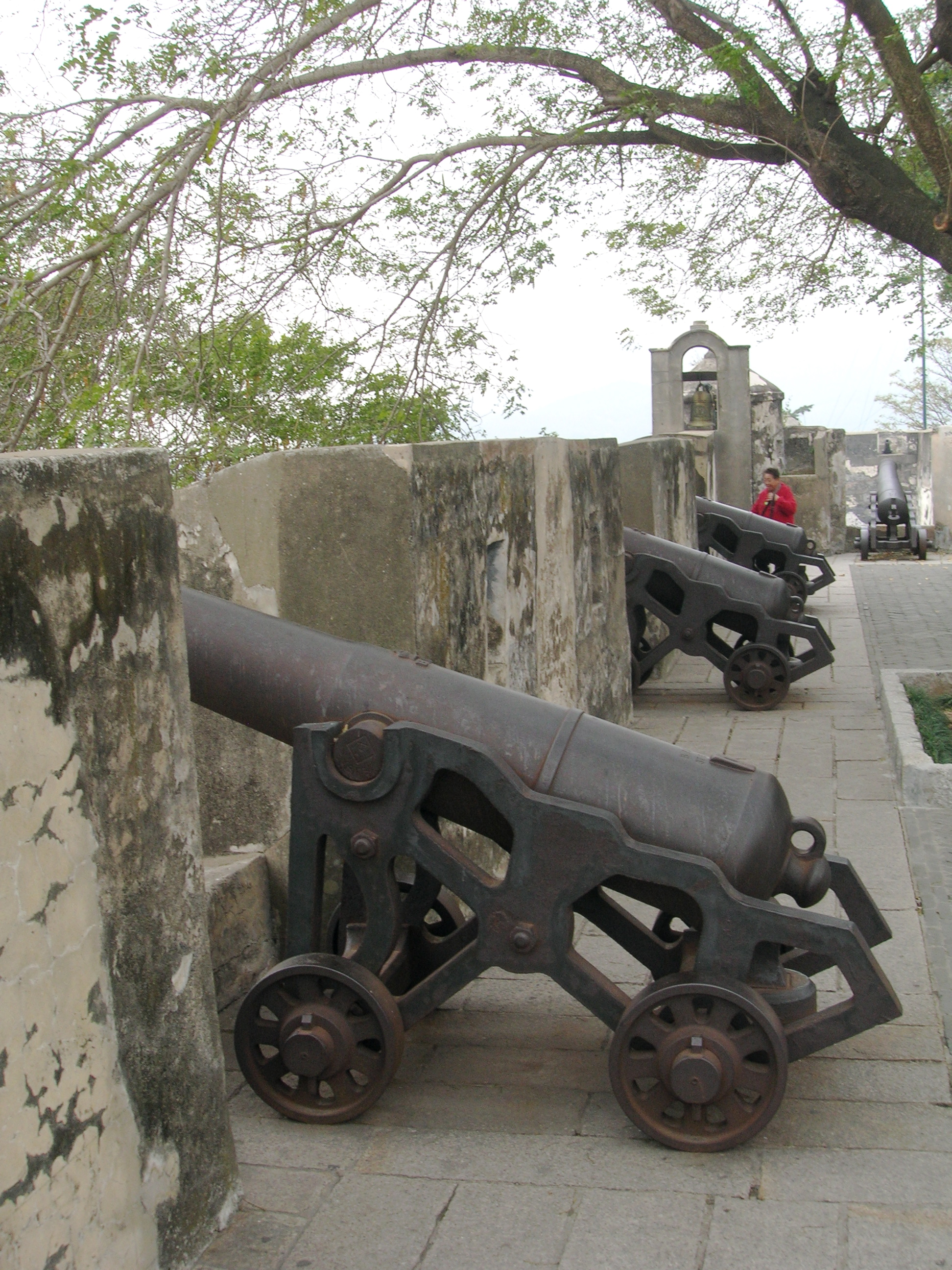
Replica cannon from 1860 line the walls of the fortress.

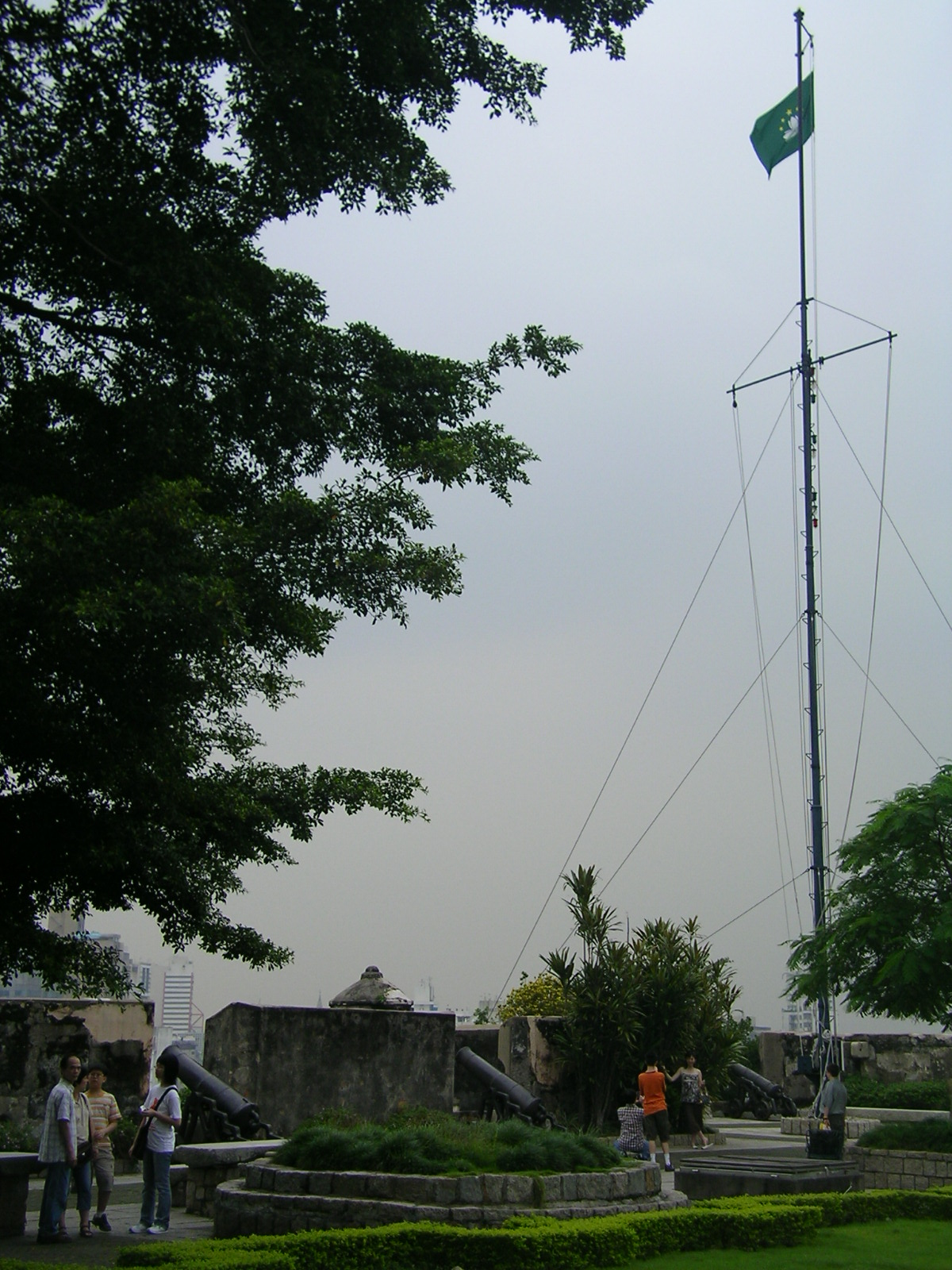
The garden of the current Fortaleza do Monte.

== See also ==
- Guia Fortress, another Portuguese fort in Macau
- Landscape crisis of the Guia Fortress
- List of Jesuit sites
- List of oldest buildings and structures in Macau
- List of tourist attractions in Macau
