= Ruins of Saint Paul's =

Remnants of 17th-century church in Macau

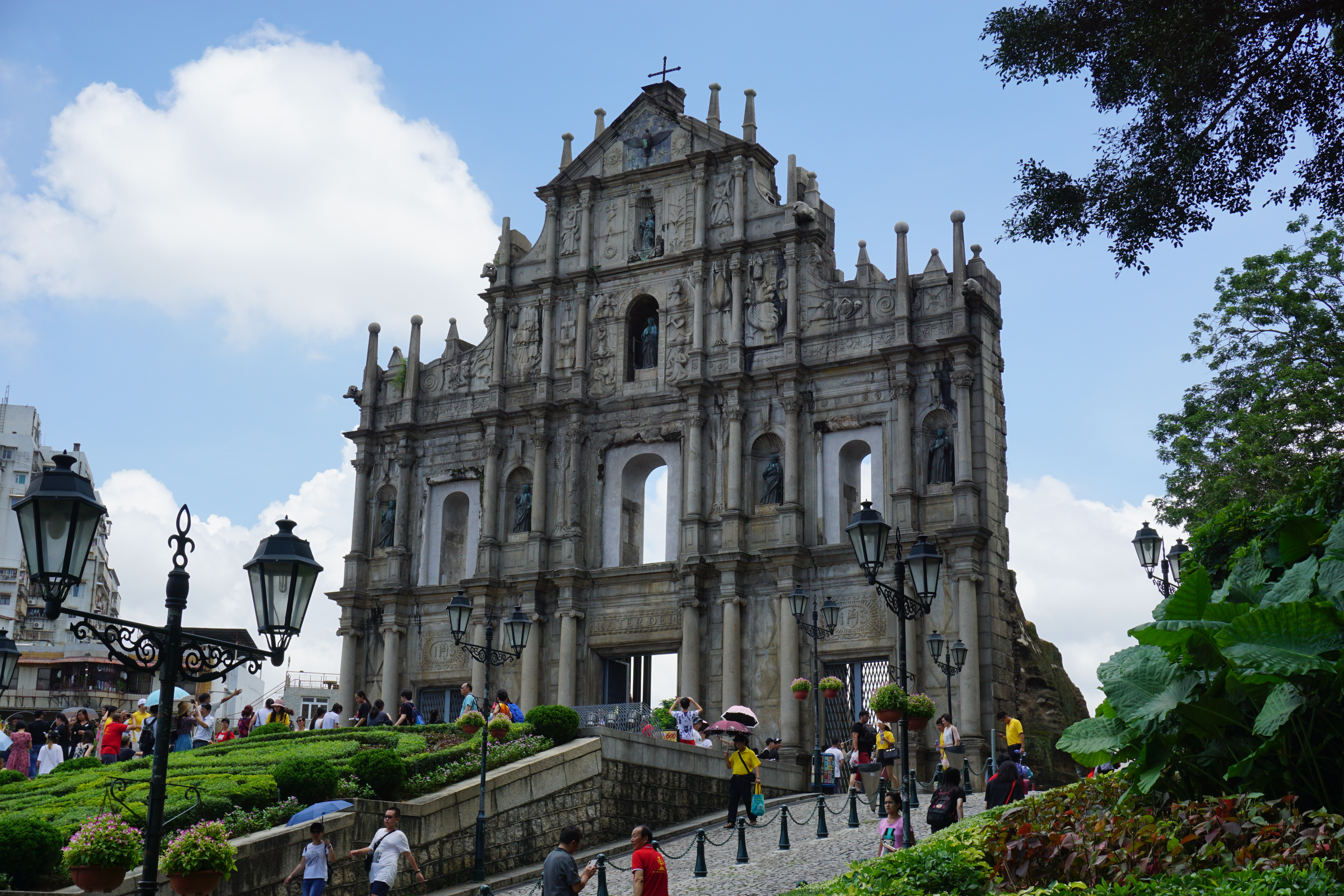
- Interactive map of Ruins of Saint Paul's
- 22°11′51″N 113°32′26″E
- Type: Ruins
- Location: Santo António, Macau

History
- Formed: Granite; masonry; bronze
- Founder: Alessandro Valignano SJ
- Built: 1637–1640
- Built for: Catholic Church
- Original use: Catholic church

Site notes
- Height: 26 m (85 ft)
- Architectural style: Baroque
- Restored: 1995
- Governing body: Macau Cultural Bureau
- Website: Official website

Ruins of Saint Paul's

Chinese name
- Chinese: 大三巴牌坊
Transcriptions
Standard Mandarin
- Hanyu Pinyin: Dàsānbā Páifāng
Yue: Cantonese
- Yale Romanization: daaih sāam bā pàaihfōng
- Jyutping: daai6 saam1 baa1 paai4 fong1

Portuguese name
- Portuguese: Ruínas de São Paulo

The Ruins of Saint Paul's (Chinese: 大三巴牌坊; Portuguese: Ruínas de São Paulo) are the remnants of a 17th-century Catholic religious complex in Santo António, Macau. They include what was originally St. Paul's College and the Church of St. Paul (Igreja de São Paulo), also known as "Mater Dei", a 17th-century Portuguese church dedicated to Saint Paul the Apostle. Today, the ruins are one of Macau's best-known landmarks and were named one of the Seven Wonders of Portuguese Origin in the World by the Portuguese government in 2010. In 2005, they were officially listed as part of the Historic Centre of Macau, a UNESCO World Heritage Site.

== History ==
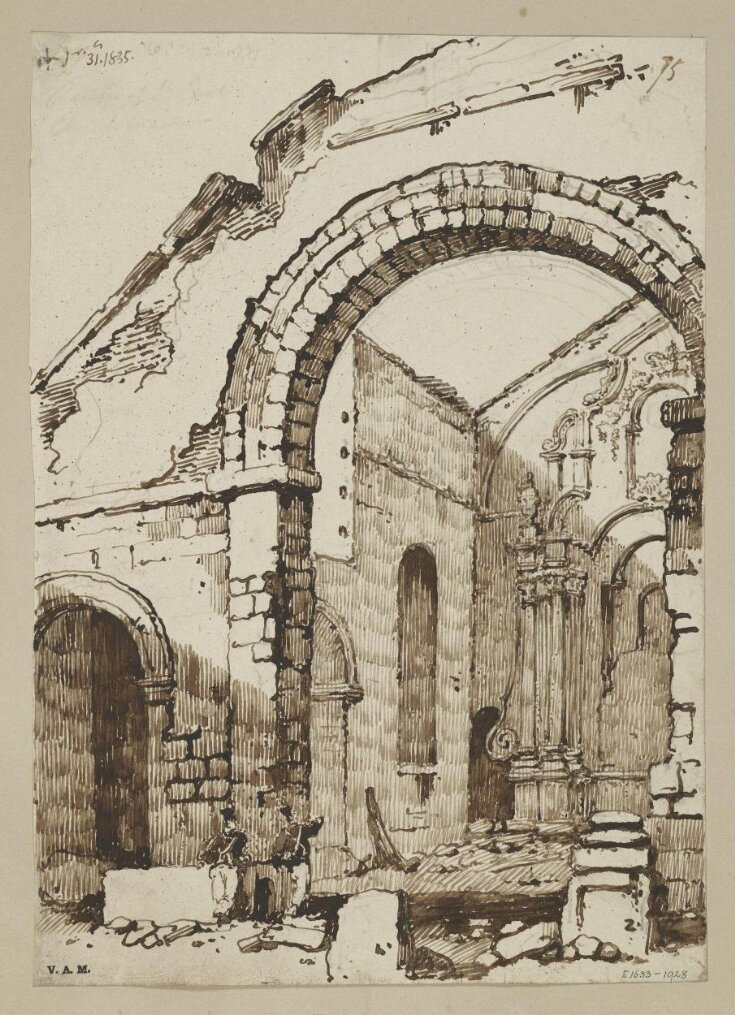
The interior of the church, drawn by George Chinnery a few days after its destruction in 1835

Built from 1602 to 1640 by the Jesuits, during the time in which Portugal and Spain were under the same crown, the church was one of the largest Catholic churches in Asia at the time. It was destroyed by a fire during a typhoon on 26 January 1835. The Fortaleza do Monte overlooks the ruin.

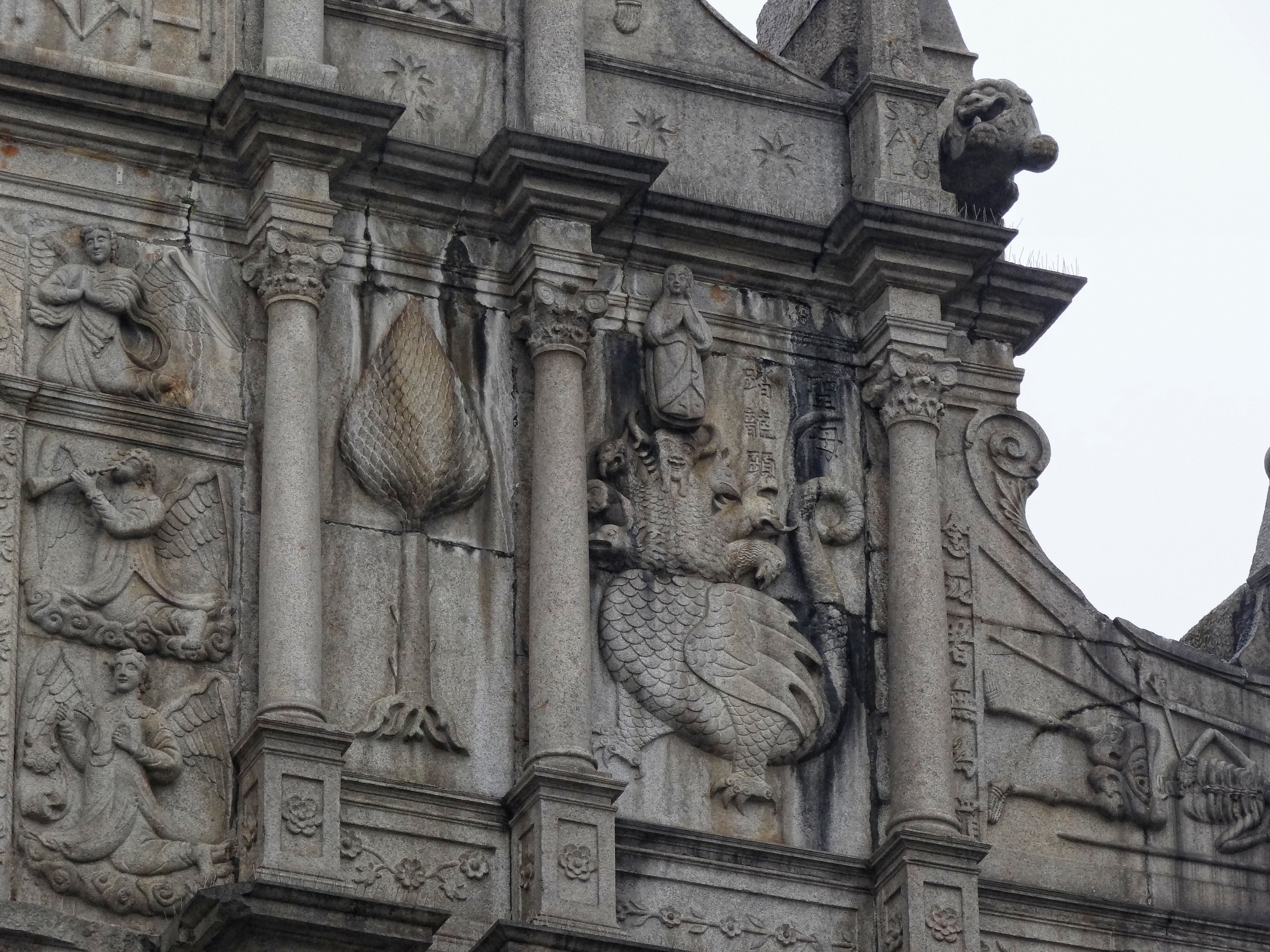
Virgin Mary stepping on a seven-headed hydra.

The ruins now consist of the stone frontispiece. The façade sits on a small hill, with 68 stone steps leading up to it. A museum is located behind it.

The façade is shaped like a retable and themed around the Assumption of Mary. Likely influenced by Japanese Christian craftsmen who worked on it, the ruins of St. Paul's include carvings with heterodox images that draw from Asian traditions, including Mary stepping on a seven-headed hydra, described in accompanying Chinese characters as "Holy Mother tramples the heads of the dragon". The base of the structure has six Chinese guardian lions carved from stone.

The Japanese Christian craftsmen who worked on St. Paul's were converted by Jesuits and expelled from Japan in 1587 when Toyotomi Hideyoshi banned Christianity. Modern visitors to the ruins can view bones of persecuted Japanese Christians in the museum located behind the façade.

The remains of around 250 Korean and Japanese slaves from the Portuguese slave trade are buried near the church.

== Conservation ==
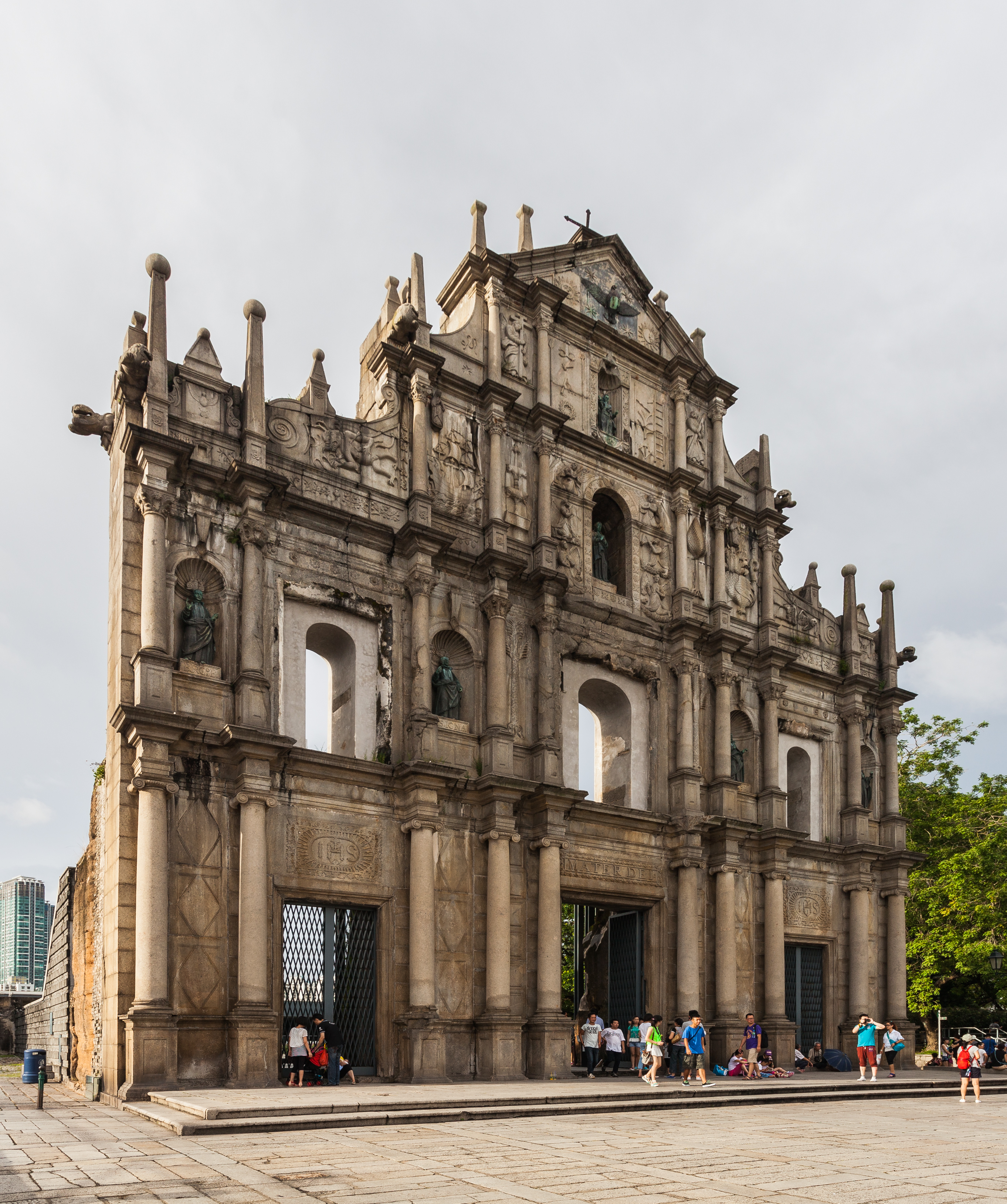
The ruins in 2013

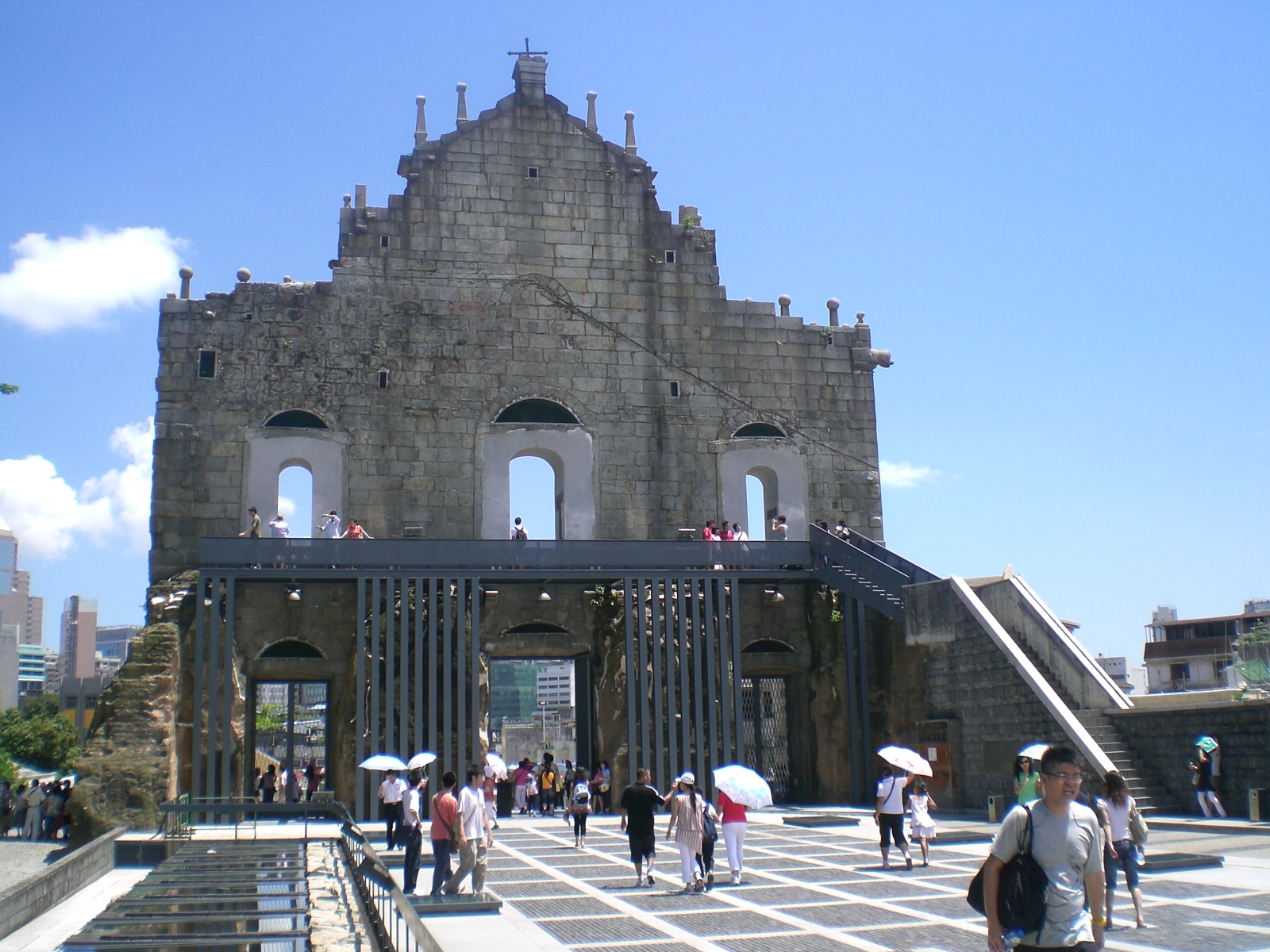
The structure behind the facade to maintain its integrity

Resisting calls for the dangerously leaning structure to be demolished, from 1990 to 1995, the ruins were excavated under the auspices of the Instituto Cultural de Macau to study its historic past. The crypt and the foundations were uncovered, revealing the architectural plan of the building. Numerous religious artifacts were also found together with the relics of the Chinese Christian martyrs and the monastic clergy, including the founder of the Jesuit college in Macau, Father Alessandro Valignano.

The ruins were restored by the Macanese government into a museum, and the façade is now buttressed with concrete and steel in a way which preserves the aesthetic integrity of the façade. There was once a steel stairway that allowed tourists to climb up to the top of the façade from the rear, but due to concerns for the preservation of the church, tourists are no longer allowed to climb up.

== See also ==
- Museum of Sacred Art and Crypt
- Religion in Macau
- List of Jesuit sites
- Ivan Vreman
