= Fort São Francisco (Macau) =

- Fortaleza de São Francisco
- Macau in China
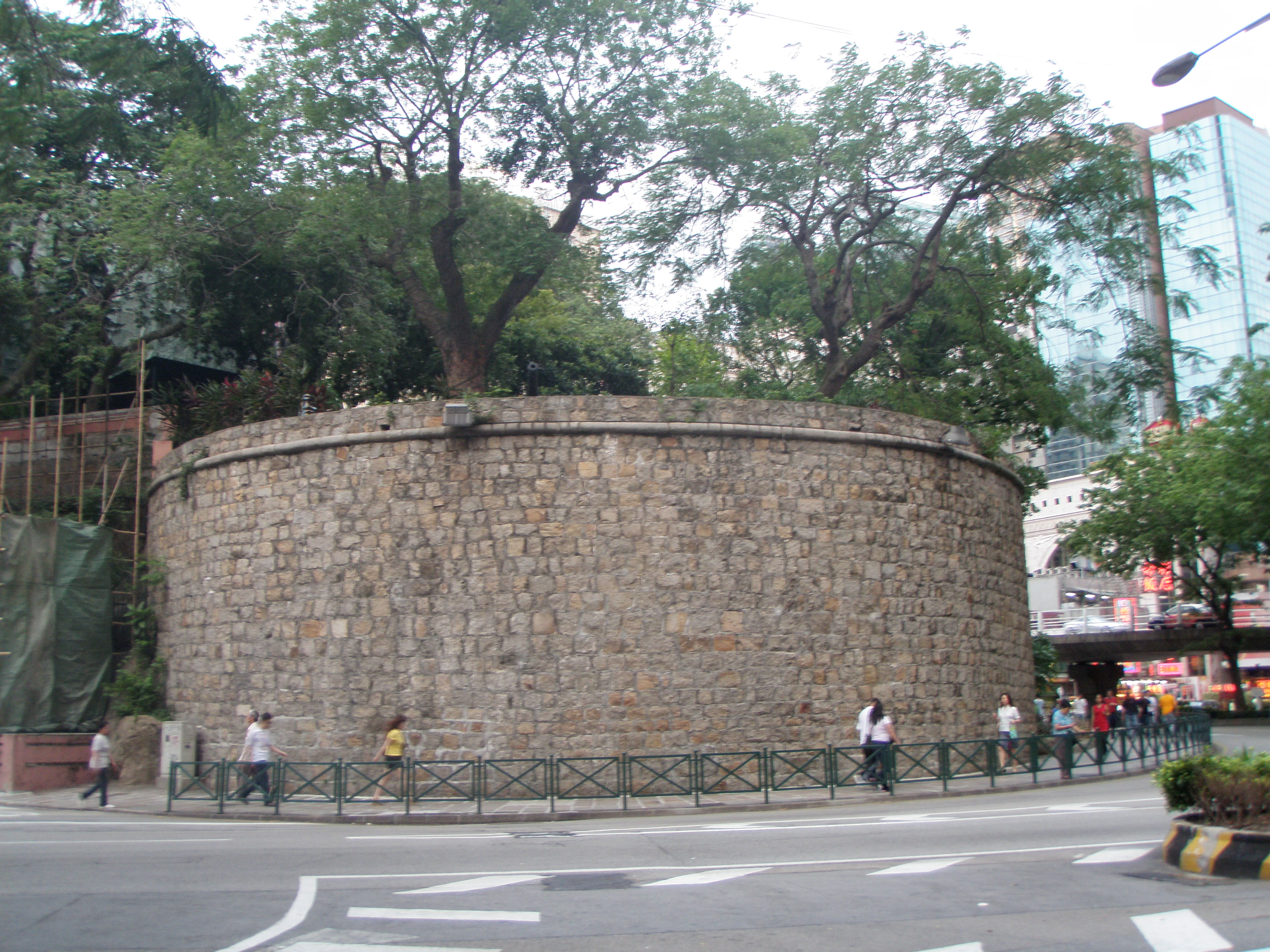

Site information
- Controlled by: Portuguese Empire; China
- Condition: Ruins

Location
- Coordinates: 22.1910°N 113.5445°E

Site history
- Built: 1629
- Built by: Portugal

Fort São Francisco of Macau (Fortaleza de São Francisco de Macau in Portuguese), also known as the São Francisco Barracks (Quartel de São Francisco in Portuguese), is a former fort of the Portuguese Empire built in Macau, China.

It was built southeast of Praia Grande, in front of Taipa channel. The fort was originally an artillery battery which sank the Dutch warship Gallias during the Battle of Macau. It was expanded in 1629 and turned into a proper fort. It had an oval shape and its walls measured six meters high. The fort was incorporated into the Monastery of Saint Francis, built by Spanish missionaries in 1580, but it closed in 1834 and was demolished in 1861. Five years later the fort became headquarters for the São Francisco Barracks to house the 4th Line Battalion that was transferred to Macau in 1864. On the cape, just below the barracks, the Battery 1º de Dezembro was built in 1872. It was demolished when the outer harbour was filled in 1934. Its artillery included a culverin that could fire a 17 kg cannonball across the channel.

The facility currently houses the Macau Security Forces Management Bureau and Museum, established in 1991, to take over the functions from the former Public Security Forces Headquarters. The fort houses a collection of old guns and armoured cars, as well as paintings of the old fort and monastery as well as other military artefacts.

== See also ==
- Portuguese Macau
