= Fort São Tiago da Barra =

Fort in Macau, China

- Fortaleza de São Tiago da Barra
- Macau in China
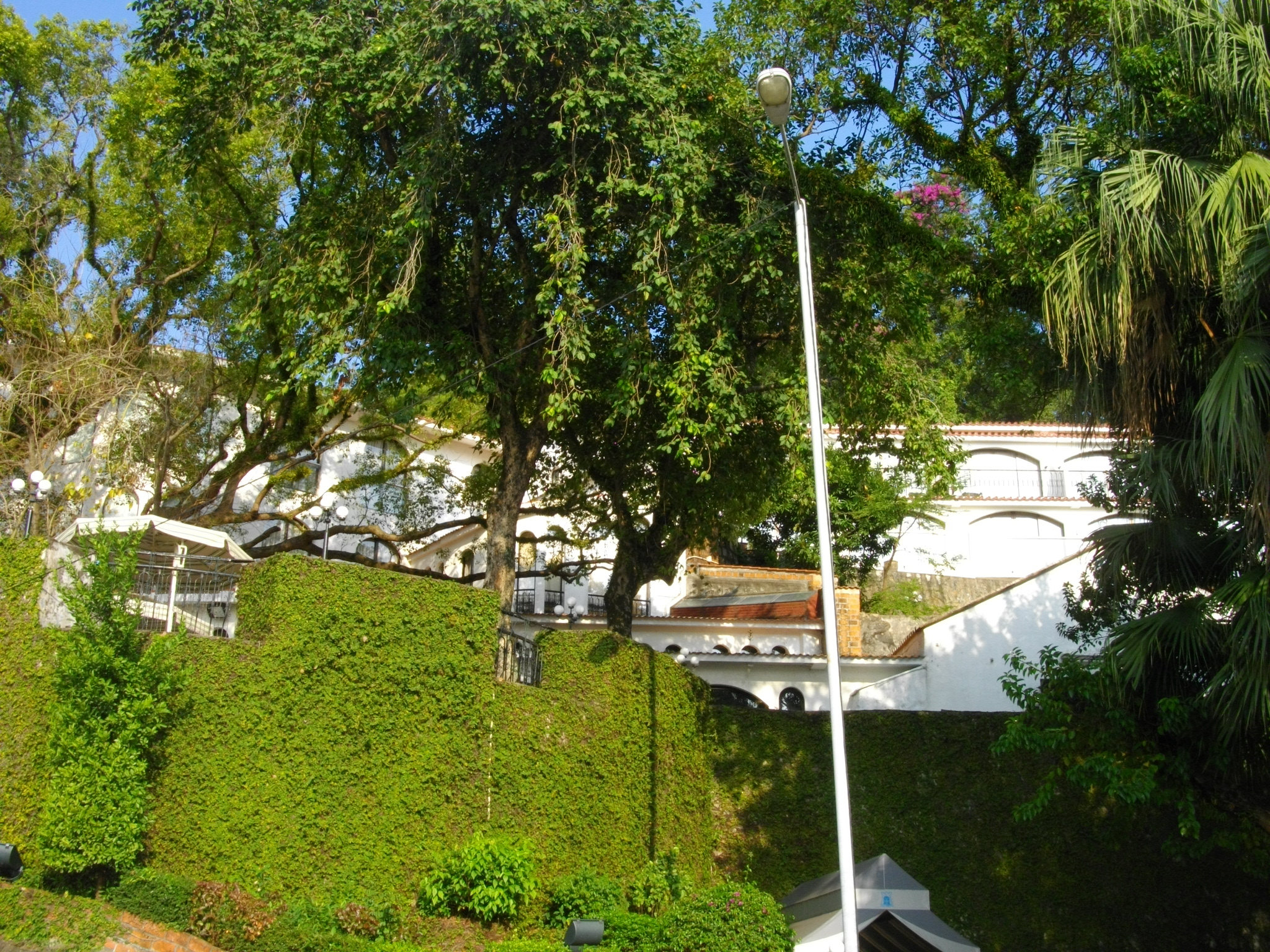

Site information
- Controlled by: Portuguese Empire; China
- Condition: Good

Location
- Coordinates: 22.1825°N 113.5307°E

Site history
- Built: 1629
- Built by: Portugal

The Fort São Tiago da Barra (Fortaleza de São Tiago da Barra in Portuguese) also known as Barra Fort (Forte da Barra in Portuguese) is located in the base of the Barra Hill, in front of Lapa Island in Macau, China, once one of the most important fortresses in the city.

== History ==
The fort was built in 1629 on the site of a previous artillery battery, erected after the Battle of Macau with the Dutch in 1622, with the function of defending the inner anchorage. The bulwarks and batteries were close to the water level, but more platforms were built up the hill. As the Portuguese had mostly blocked the channel way, ships had to sail by very close to the fort, conferring it great effectiveness. On the hills at the southern end of the Macao peninsula, it was a citadel within the city. Its walls were six meters at the base, 3.3 meters at the top, rising to 30 feet in height. Its captain was appointed directly by the king of Portugal.

Its main platform measured 113m x 42m, housing, a cistern with a capacity of 3,000 liters and facilities for the commander and 60 soldiers. Further up the hill was a guardhouse, and at ground level, stores for ammunition and supplies and a spacious house. The fort now has a chapel named after São Tiago, patron of the army, from 1746, when the fort was reinforced and expanded. By thein the upper stronghold was equipped with 16 guns (twelve 24-caliber and four 50-caliber cannons), and another 6 long range (24-caliber) guns within another bulwark. Like other defensive structures, it fell into disrepair over the centuries until, during World War II, the old cannons were sold to buy rice to feed refugees from Hong Kong and China.

Over the years the fort was gradually demolished for road construction and from 1976 onwards it was no longer used by the Maritime Police. The Tourism Department of the Government of Macau restored it and reclassified it as a guesthouse, the "Pousada de São Tiago", inaugurated in 1981, today one of Macau's main attractions. Visitors can visit the chapel inside, where the image of the Virgin and patron-saint São Tiago stand out. A popular folk story is associated with the statue of São Tiago, as it is said that it would leave at night to patrol, being found in its place with muddy boots by morning.

In front of the fort the armillary sphere that used to adorn the Senate Square can be seen.

Portuguese journalists have recently reported the statue of São Tiago as missing.

== See also ==
- Portuguese Macau
