= Grace Wong (disambiguation) =

Grace Wong may refer to:

- Grace Wong, Hong Kong actress, dancer, singer, television host and beauty pageant titleholder
- Grace Wong Kit-cheng, member of the Legislative Assembly of Macau Special Administrative Region
