= Luísa Constantina =

Portuguese sculptor (1941–1990)

- Born: 30 August 1941; Ponta Delgada, Azores, Portugal
- Died: 31 December 1990 (aged 49); Ponta Delgada, Azores, Portugal
- Education: Lisbon School of Fine Arts; University of Coimbra
- Occupations: Sculptor; arts administrator; screenwriter

Luísa Constantina de Ataíde da Costa Gomes (30 August 1941 – 31 December 1990), better known as Luísa Constantina, was a Portuguese sculptor, arts administrator, and screenwriter. She worked on sculptures made of basalt from her native Azores. She was also director of the Ponta Delgada Academy of Free Arts and, from 1965 until 1975, director of sculpture and African ethnography at the Museu Regional Carlos Machado.

== Biography ==
She was born on 30 August 1941 in Ponta Delgada, the daughter of the painter Maria Luísa Ataíde and granddaughter of Luís Bernardo Leite de Ataíde. She discovered a natural beauty in volcanic substances and displayed an affility in sculpting them, and she got her sculpture degree from the Lisbon School of Fine Arts, as well as a degree in pedagogical sciences in University of Coimbra. She later did work on sculptures made of Azorean basalt, with Enciclopédia Açoriana saying that she "remained faithful to the chisel and hammer [...] giving it a touch of human creation - a face, an air of emotion - without ever torturing a stone, as she said." She later did a solo exhibition at the Museu Regional Carlos Machado in 1966 or 1967, as well as at Tara Arts Center in Salisbury, Rhodesia in 1969.

She worked at the Museu Regional Carlos Machado as director of sculpture and African ethnography (1965-1975) and the Commercial and Industrial School of Ponta Delgada as a drawing teacher (1965-1967). She later moved to Macau, where she worked at the construction office at the Governor Nobre de Carvalho Bridge and was a drawing teacher at Liceu de Macau and Escola do Magistério Primário. Returning to Portugal, she worked as director of the Ponta Delgada Academy of Free Arts and as an assistant in sculpture at the Lisbon School of Fine Arts (1983-1986), and she had a solo exhibition in Arco 8 in Ponta Delgada. She also participated in collective exhibitions in such places as Hotel Lisboa Macau (1973), Ponta Delgada Academy of Arts (1979-1981), Lajes Field (1982), Teatro Municipal Baltazar Dias in Funchal (1983), Lisbon School of Fine Arts (1984), Rotch–Jones–Duff House and Garden Museum (1985), Bristol Community College (1985), the Susan Blanchard Gallery in New York City, (1986), and the Inter-American Development Bank (1986). She later became the patron of the Escola Luísa Constantina.

Outside of sculpture, she also worked as an illustrator, working on a 1974 Chinese-language edition of Luís de Camões's work Os Lusíadas while in Macau, as well as a screenwriter, with one of her works being the RTP Açores film Etnografia da Costa Norte da ilha de San Miguel (1980). She also worked in building restoration, with her work including the Governor's Palace, the Luís de Camões Museum, numerous buildings within São Miguel Island, and membership in the Ribeira Grande Municipal Council's heritage defense group. One of her literary works was a biographical article on sculptor Ernesto Canto da Maia.

Her husband was a navy admiral, and they had a son, architect Luís Bernardo Brito e Abreu.

She died on 31 December 1990 in Ponta Delgada. Her work is shown publicly at the Museu Regional Carlos Machado and Museu de Angra do Heroísmo, at the Legislative Assembly of the Azores, several other public places and banks in Azores, and the Banco Nacional Ultramarino in Macau. Her residence in Rabo de Peixe, Pico do Refúgio, later became a hotel.

== Filmography ==
Year	Title	Note	Ref.
1980	Etnografia da Costa Norte da ilha de San Miguel	Screenwriter	
