= Handover Gifts Museum of Macao =

Museum in Sé, Macau, China

- 澳門回歸賀禮陳列館 (Chinese); Museu das Ofertas sobre a Transferência de Soberania de Macau (Portuguese)

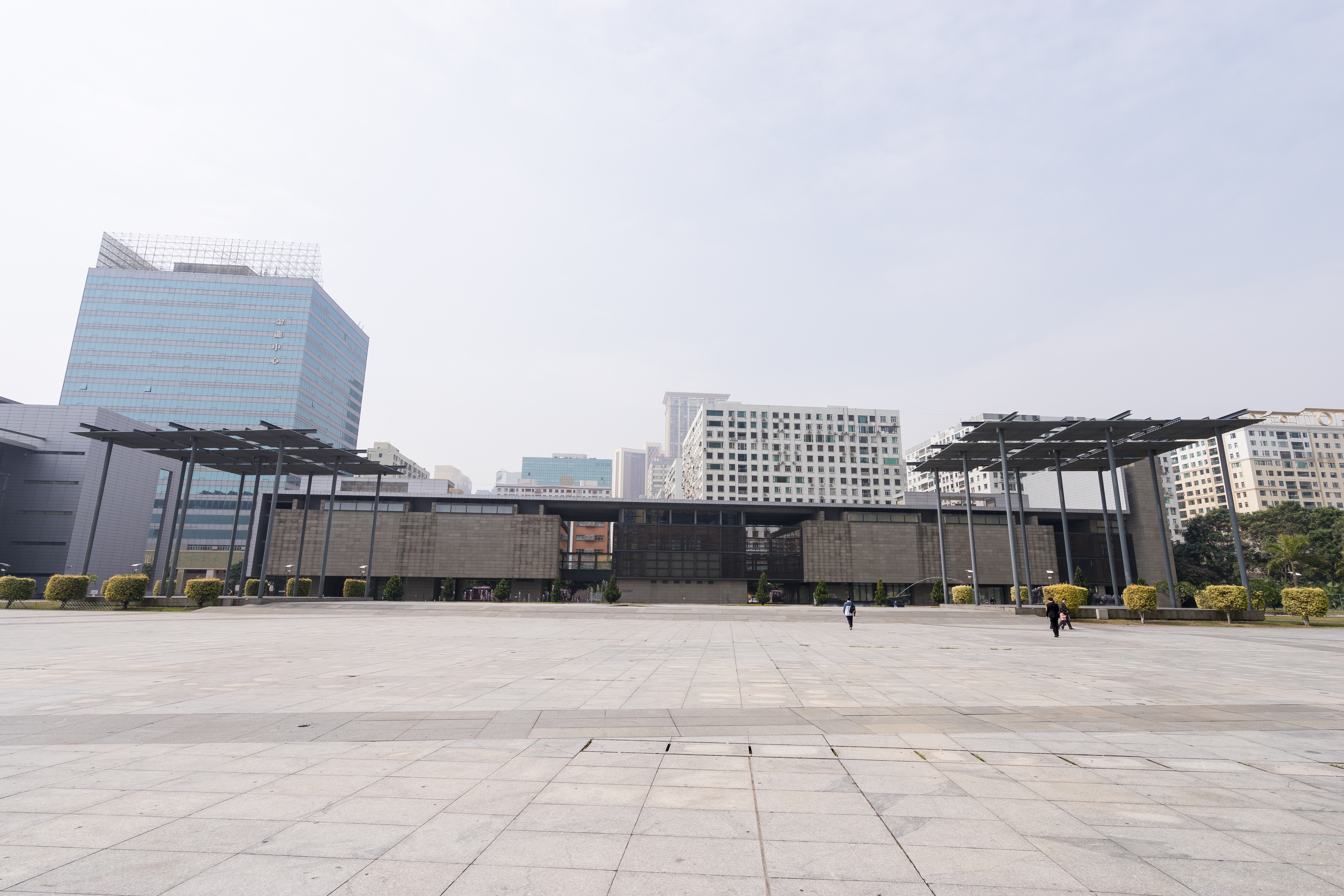
- Established: 30 December 2004; 21 years ago
- Location: Sé, Macau, China
- Coordinates: 22°11′23.6″N 113°33′14.6″E
- Type: museum
- Management: Macao Museum of Art
- Architect: Vincente Bravo Ferreira
- Website: Official website

Handover Gifts Museum of Macao

Chinese name
- Traditional Chinese: 澳門回歸賀禮陳列館
- Simplified Chinese: 澳门回归贺礼陈列馆
Transcriptions
Standard Mandarin
- Hanyu Pinyin: Àomén Huíguī Hèlǐ Chénlièguǎn
Yue: Cantonese
- Jyutping: ou3 mun4*2 wui4 gwai1 ho6 lai5 can4 lit6 gun2

Portuguese name
- Portuguese: Museu das Ofertas sobre a Transferência de Soberania de Macau

The Handover Gifts Museum of Macao (Chinese: 澳門回歸賀禮陳列館; Portuguese: Museu das Ofertas sobre a Transferência de Soberania de Macau) is a museum commemorating the Handover of Macau in Sé, Macau, China. It is located on the same site of the temporary pavilion for the handover ceremony which was later demolished, both were designed by Vicente Bravo Ferreira. The construction of the museum started in March 2003 and was completed in October 2004. The museum was then officially opened on 30 December 2004.

== Architecture ==
The museum is a three-story building. The first floor houses the museum's lobby, entrance and administrative offices. The second floor houses both the handover gifts exhibition gallery and the special exhibition gallery. The auditorium is located on the third floor.

== Exhibitions ==
The museum exhibits auspicious gifts given by the 56 ethnic groups of China to celebrate the establishment of the special administrative region of Macau.

== See also ==
- List of museums in Macau
