= Macao Cultural Centre =

Cultural centre in Sé, Macau

- 澳門文化中心 (Chinese); Centro Cultural de Macau (Portuguese)
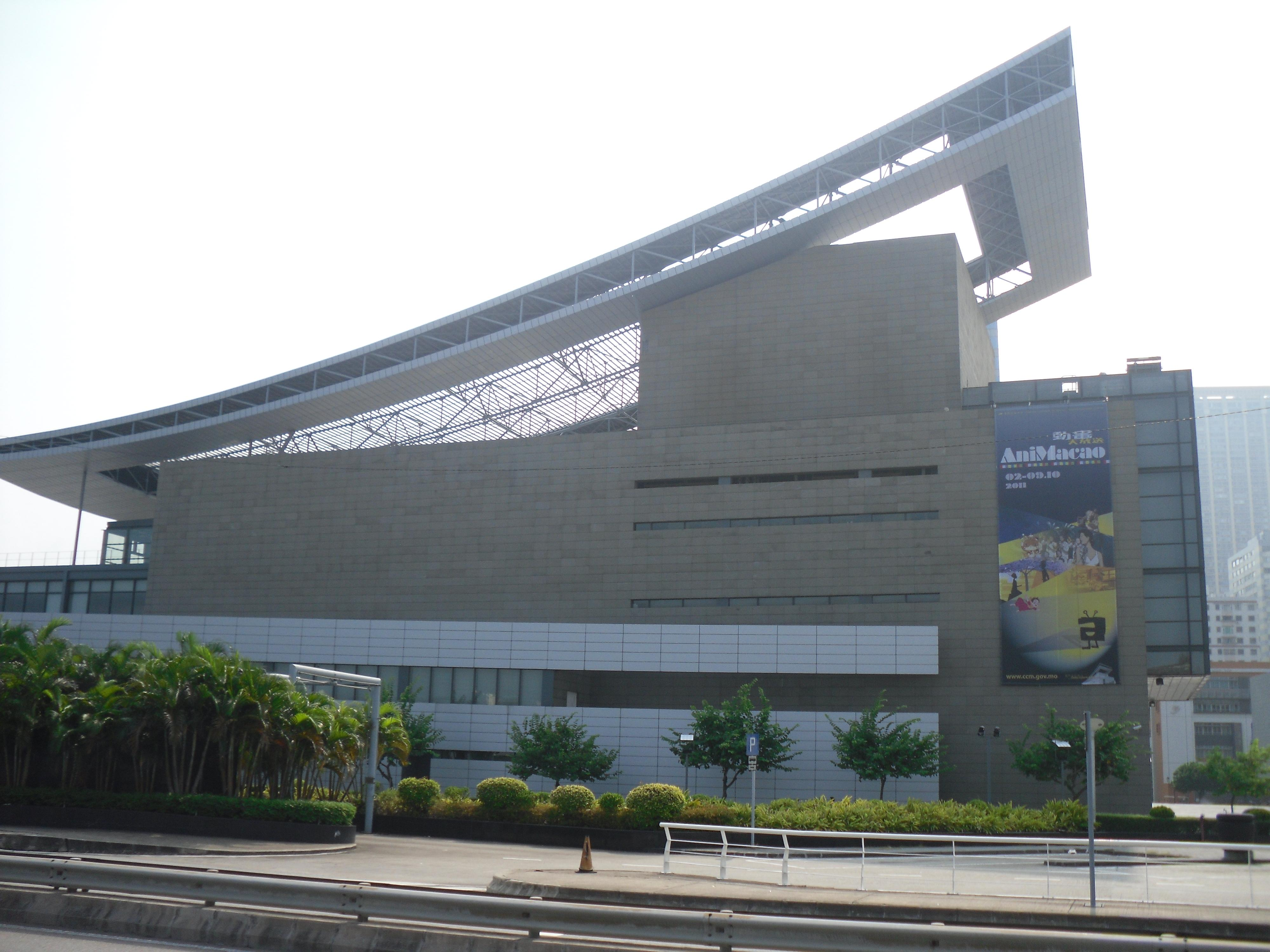
- Interactive map of the Macao Cultural Centre area

General information
- Type: Cultural center
- Location: Sé, Macau
- Coordinates: 22°11′19.9″N 113°33′19.0″E
- Opened: 1999
- Cost: US$100 million

Technical details
- Floor count: 5
- Floor area: 45,000 m^{2}

Other information
- Seating capacity: 1,080 (Grand Auditorium)

Website
- Official website

Macao Cultural Centre

Chinese name
- Traditional Chinese: 澳門文化中心
- Simplified Chinese: 澳门文化中心
Transcriptions
Standard Mandarin
- Hanyu Pinyin: Àomén Wénhuà Zhōngxīn
Yue: Cantonese
- Jyutping: ou3 mun4*2 man4 faa3 zung1 sam1

Portuguese name
- Portuguese: Centro Cultural de Macau

The Macao Cultural Centre (MCC; Chinese: 澳門文化中心; Portuguese: Centro Cultural de Macau) is a cultural centre in Sé, Macau. The cultural centre was founded in 1999 with a cost of US$100 million. In August 2017, the roof of the cultural center was damaged due to Typhoon Hato. The cultural centre is housed in a five-storey building with a total area of 45,000 square metres (480,000 sq ft). The cultural centre regularly holds musical performances.

== See also ==
- List of museums in Macau
- Culture of Macau
