= Macau Wine Museum =

Museum in Macau, China

- 葡萄酒博物馆
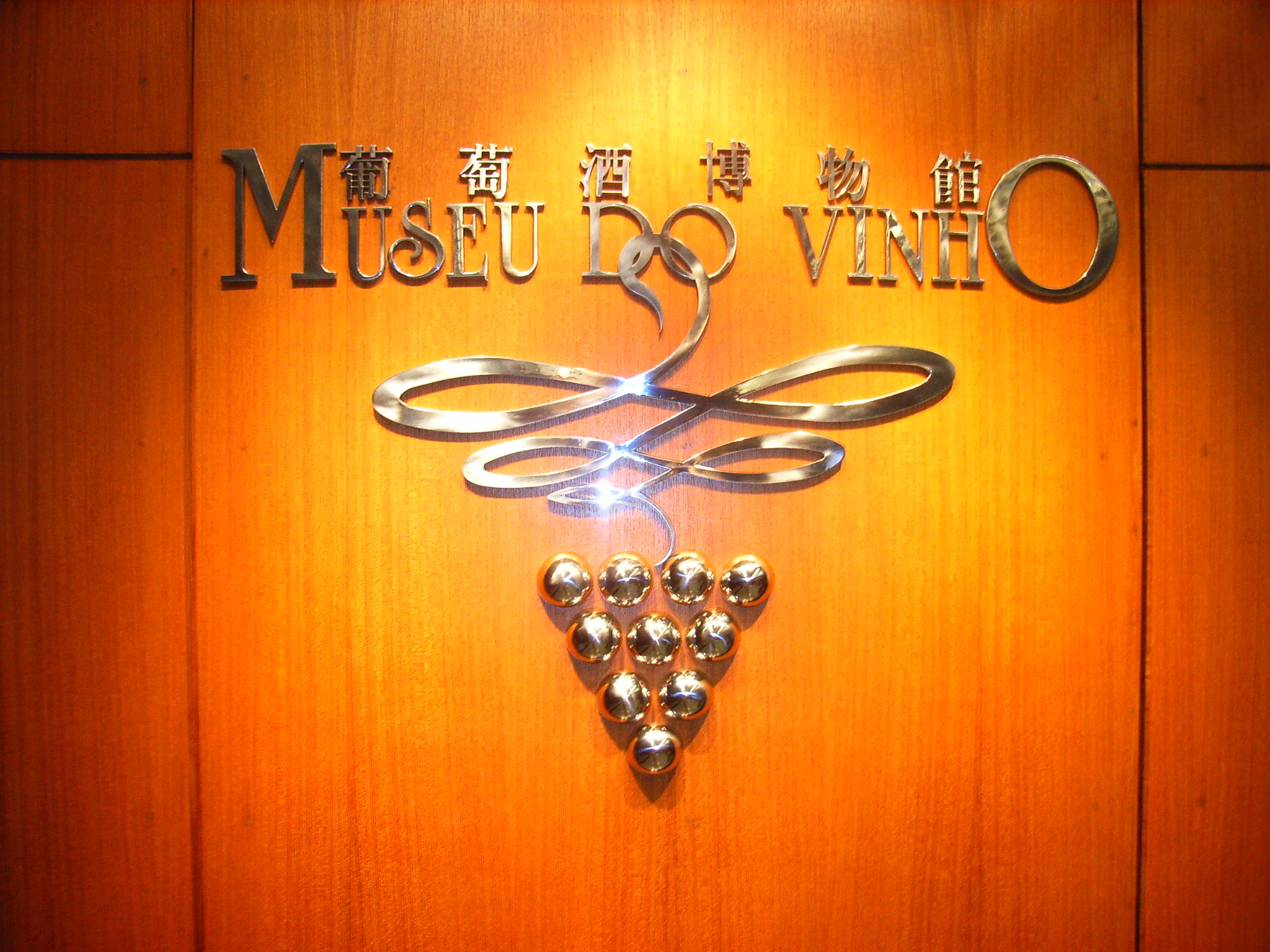
- Established: 25 December 1995
- Location: Rua Luis Gonzaga Gomes 431, Macau, China
- Coordinates: 22.194706°N 113.552696°E

The Macau Wine Museum (Chinese: 葡萄酒博物馆; Portuguese: Museu do Vinho) is a wine museum in Sé, Macau, China. It is located next to the Grand Prix Museum.

== History ==
The museum was inaugurated on 25 December 1995.

== Description ==
The museum spans over an area of 1,400 m^{2}. Its collection contains 1,115 different wines. Its earliest bottle is an 1815 Martle. The museum is divided into three sections: history of wine-making, wine collections, and wine displays.

Portuguese wines are displayed in accordance with the vintages respective region of origin and a wine tasting station.

== See also ==
- Macau Grand Prix Museum
- List of museums in Macau
