= Lin Zexu Memorial Museum of Macau =

Museum in Nossa Senhora de Fátima, Macau, China

- 澳門林則徐紀念館 (Chinese); Museu Lin Zexu de Macau (Portuguese)
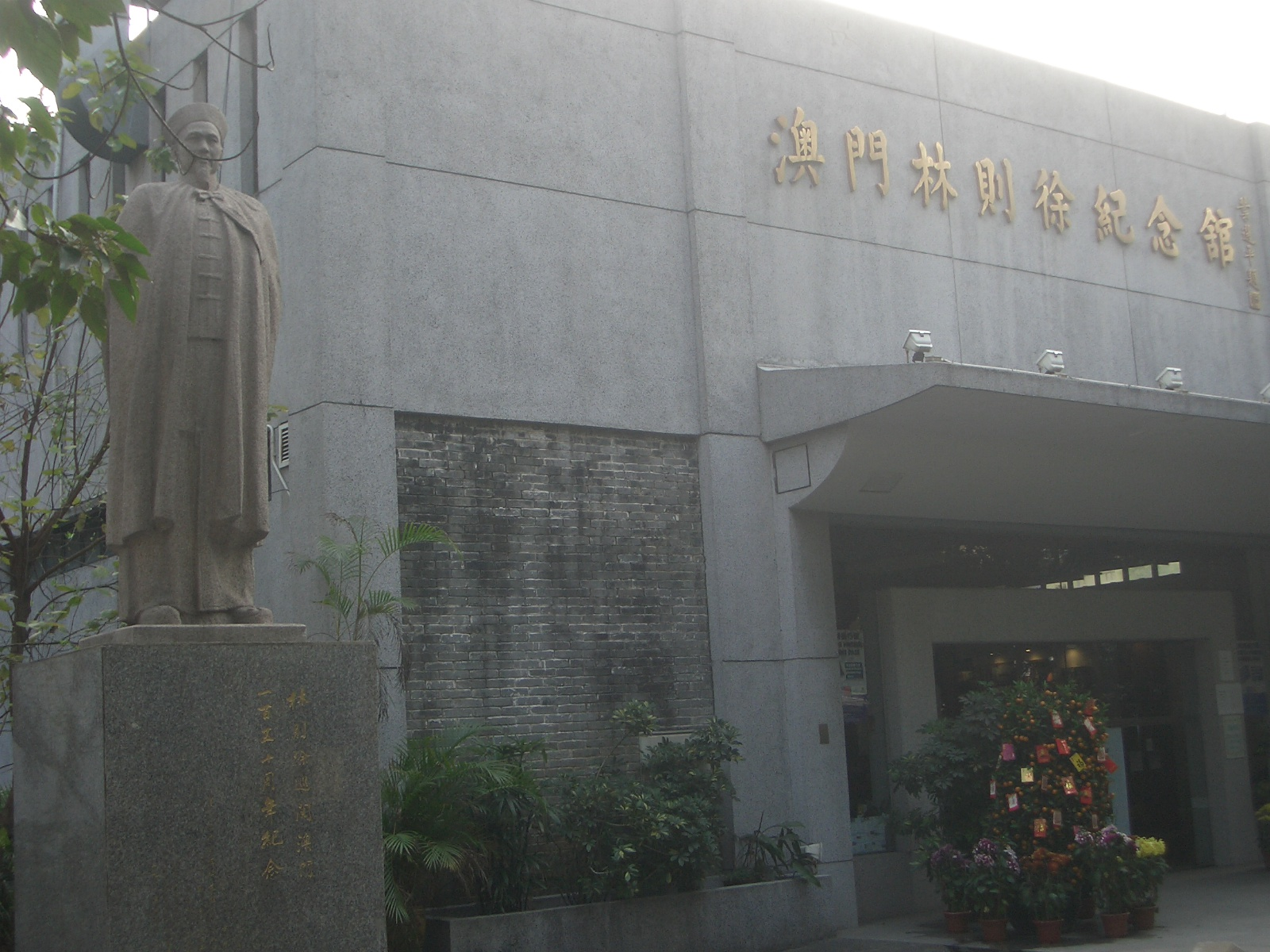
- Established: November 1997
- Location: Nossa Senhora de Fátima, Macau, China
- Coordinates: 22°12′34.6″N 113°32′50.3″E
- Type: museum
- Website: Official website (in Chinese)

Lin Zexu Memorial Museum of Macau

Chinese name
- Traditional Chinese: 澳門林則徐紀念館
- Simplified Chinese: 澳门林则徐纪念馆
Transcriptions
Standard Mandarin
- Hanyu Pinyin: Àomén Lín Zéxú Jìniànguǎn
Yue: Cantonese
- Jyutping: ou3 mun4*2 lam4 zak1 ceoi4 gei2 nim6 gun2

Portuguese name
- Portuguese: Museu Lin Zexu de Macau

The Lin Zexu Memorial Museum of Macau (Chinese: 澳門林則徐紀念館; Portuguese: Museu Lin Zexu de Macau) is a museum in Nossa Senhora de Fátima, Macau, China about Lin Zexu's arrival in Macau on 3 September 1839.

== History ==
The museum was completed in November 1997. In June 2017, the museum became part of the area where the Macau International Industrial Technology Development Association launched a Wi-Fi hotspot.

== Architecture ==
The museum features the statue of Lin Zexu at its entrance with a height of 4 metres (13 ft). The museum exhibition areas consists of Ban on Opium Trade and Inspection of Macao, Everlasting Memorials, Eyes Opened to the World and Macao before the Inspection Tour.

== Exhibitions ==
The museum exhibits various photography of history during Lin Zexu period.

== See also ==
- List of museums in Macau
