= Liceu de Macau =

Former public school in Macau

- 澳門利宵中學
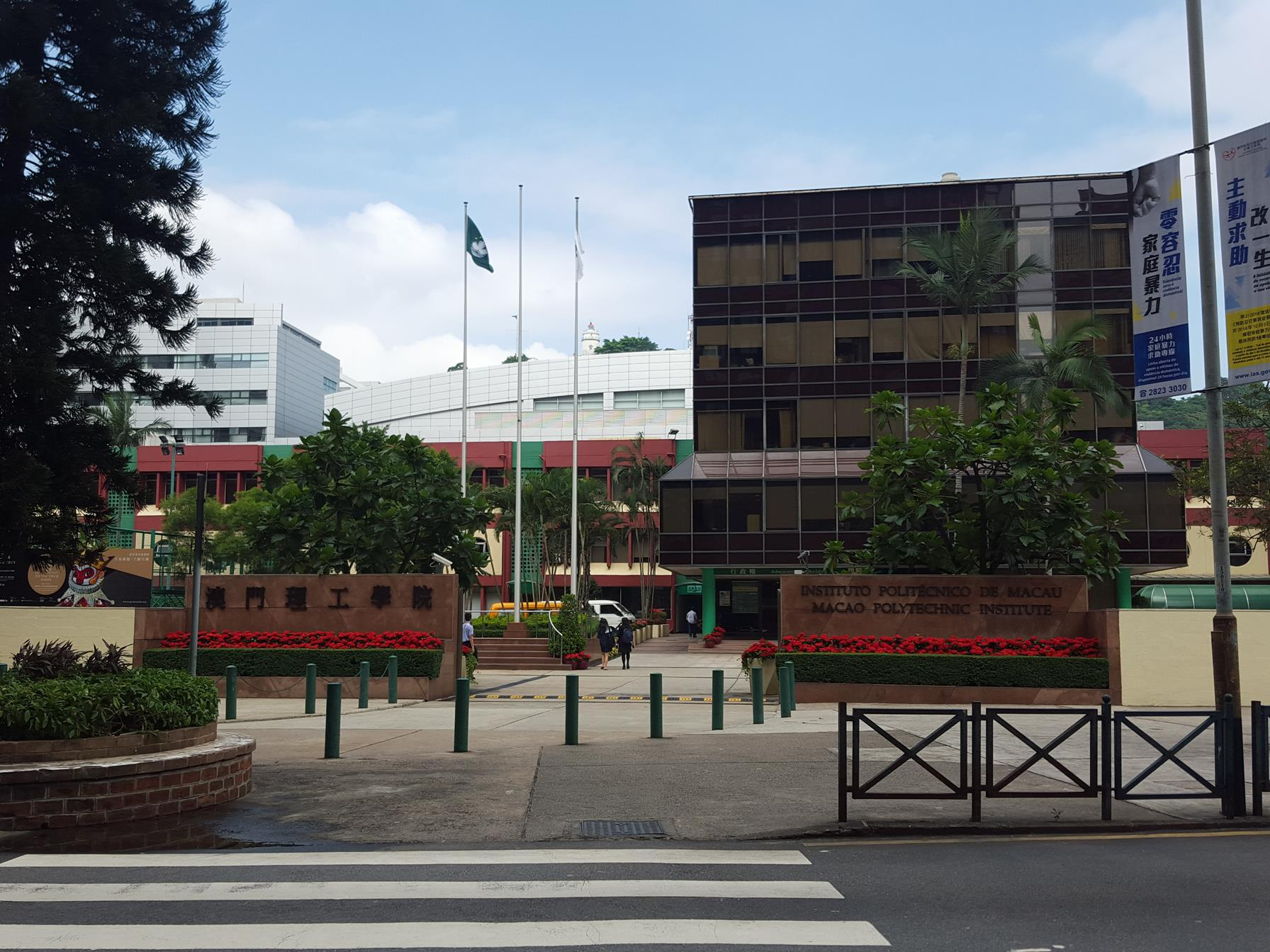
- The building which housed the former Liceu de Macau now houses part of the Macao Polytechnic University (formerly Macau Polytechnic Institute)

Location
- Sé, Macau, China
- Coordinates: 22.193534°N 113.551838°E

Information
- Type: Public
- Closed: 1998

Liceu de Macau
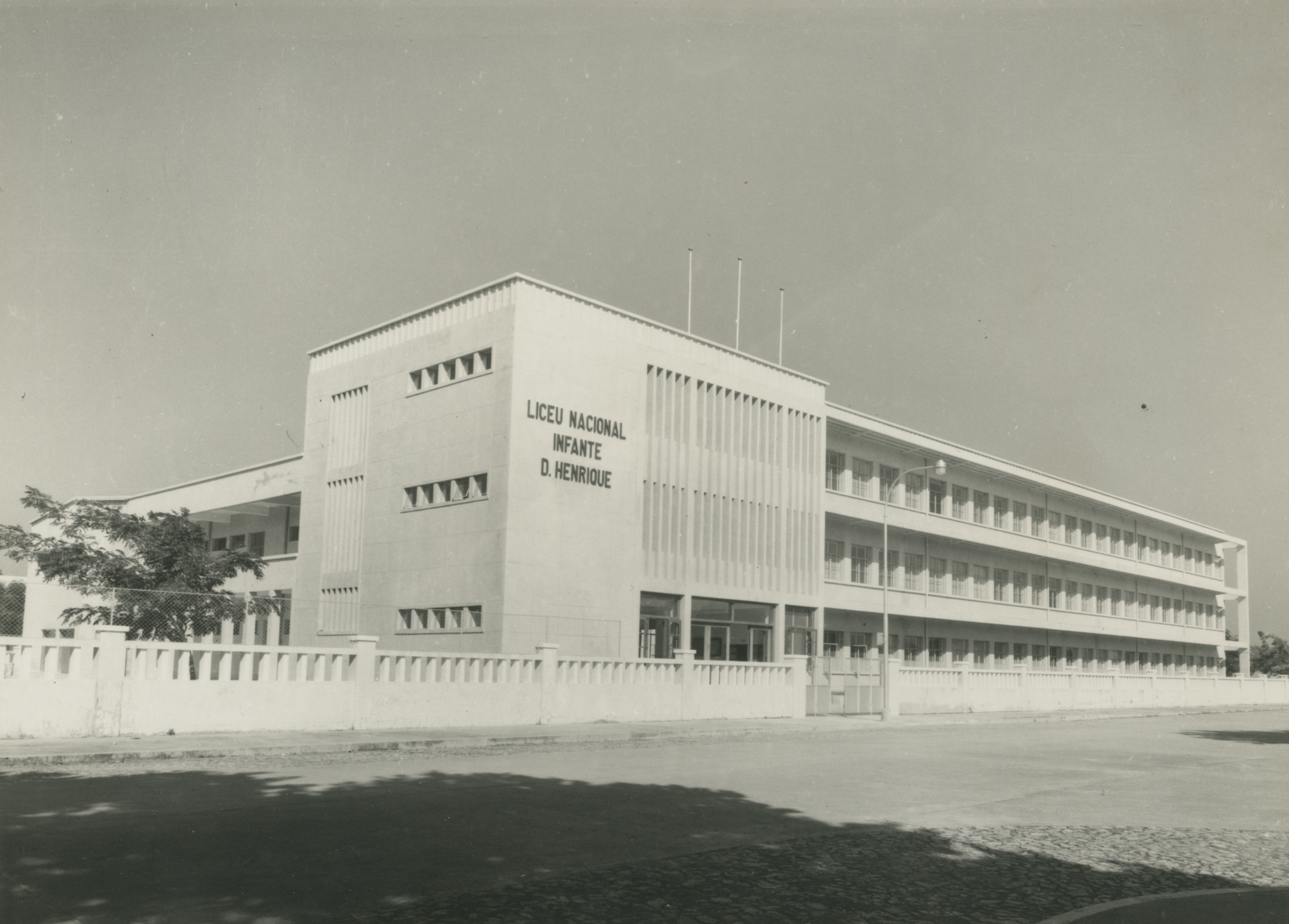
- Historical picture (after 1937).

Chinese name
- Traditional Chinese: 澳門利宵中學
- Simplified Chinese: 澳门利宵中学
Transcriptions
Standard Mandarin
- Hanyu Pinyin: Àomén Lìxiāo Zhōngxué
Yue: Cantonese
- Jyutping: ou3 mun4*2 lei6 siu1 zung1 hok6

Portuguese name
- Portuguese: Liceu de Macau

Liceu de Macau (Chinese: 澳門利宵中學) was a Portuguese-curriculum public secondary school in Sé, Macau. It was the territory's only public Lusophone secondary school.

Its students included local Han Chinese and Macanese as well as children of Portuguese government officials. Students who chose this school would have been prepared for education in universities in Portugal.

== History ==
Circa 1998 the school occupied a campus in central Macau that had been designed by a well-known Portuguese architect. Cathryn H. Clayton, the author of Sovereignty at the Edge: Macau & the Question of Chineseness, wrote that compared to most schools in Macau, the Liceu's class sizes were small. She added that the faculty received good salaries and benefits and that the campus was among the most lavish and expensive to maintain. A large percentage of the students matriculated to universities with the majority moving on to European institutions, including those in Portugal itself. Clayton concluded that the school "reflected the conditions of advantage enjoyed by the Portuguese in Macau".

The school's administration chose not to directly teach the history of Macau, although some teachers chose to incorporate that history within their history lessons. Clayton stated that, of all of the school's in Macau, Liceu de Macau was the only one she was aware of which had its own swimming pool.

In 1998 students were transferred to the Macau Portuguese School, a private school which receives funding from the Portuguese government. The former Liceu de Macau campus became the Macao Polytechnic University (formerly Macao Polytechnic Institute) main building.

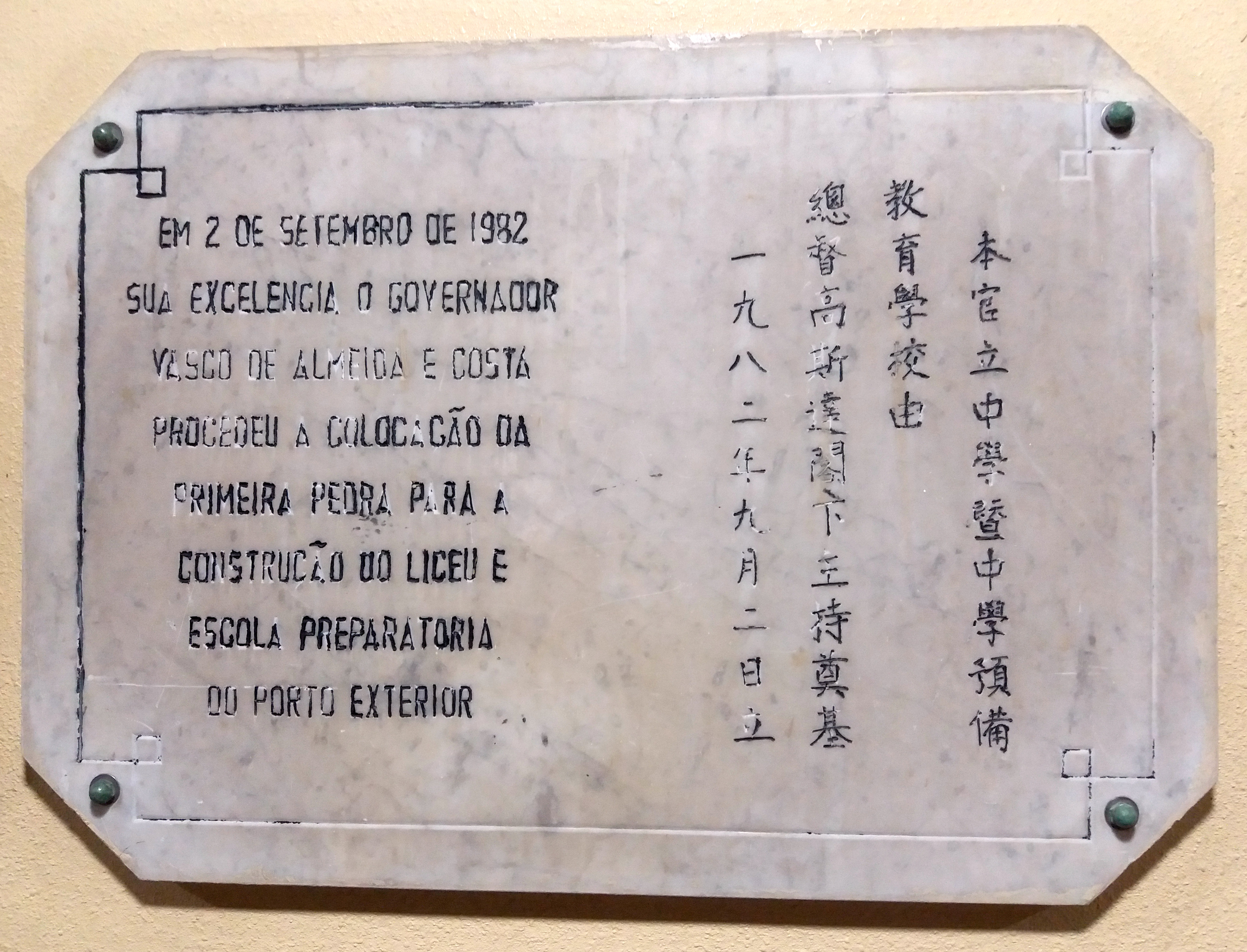
Monument for Liceu de Macau
