= Heritage Exhibition of a Traditional Pawnshop Business =

Museum in Sé, Macau, China

- 典當業展示館; Espaço Patrimonial uma Casa de Penhores Tradicional
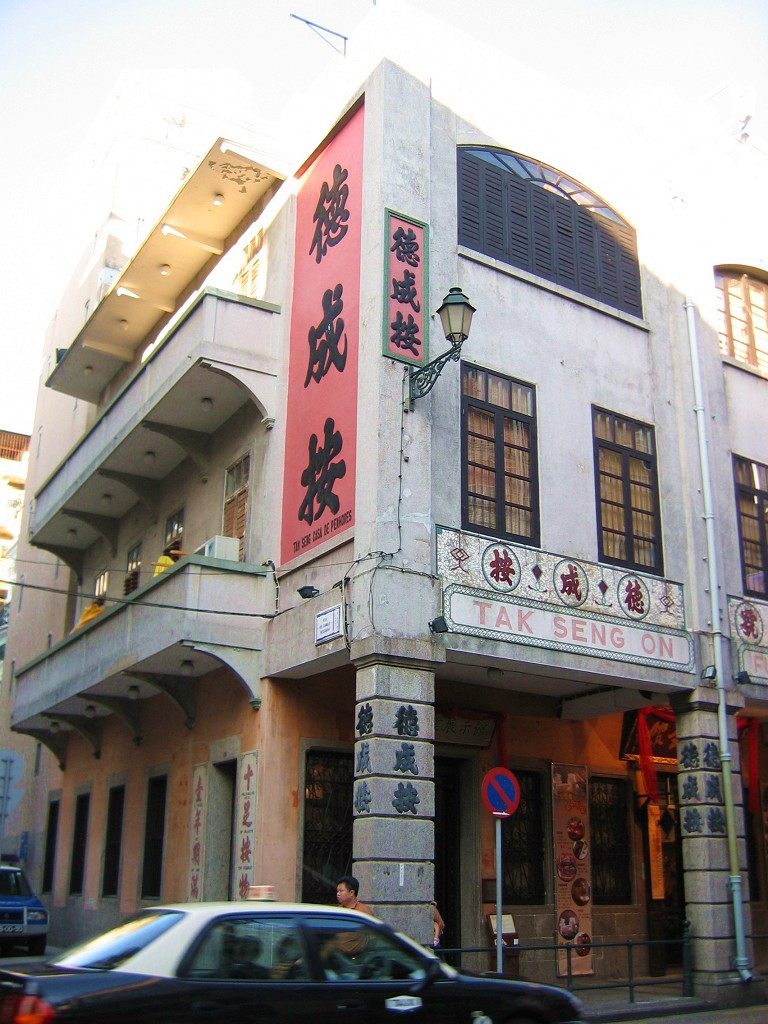
- Established: 21 March 2003
- Location: Sé, Macau, China
- Coordinates: 22°11′N 113°32′E
- Type: museum
- Website: Official website

The Heritage Exhibition of a Traditional Pawnshop Business (Chinese: 典當業展示館; Portuguese: Espaço Patrimonial uma Casa de Penhores Tradicional) is a public museum in Sé, Macau, China.

== History ==
The building was originally established in 1917 as the Virtue and Success Pawnshop (德成按; Tak Seng On Pawnshop) by Kou Ho Neng and Wong Hung Shan. The shop was closed in 1993 due to the decline in pawnshop business. In 2000, the Secretariat for Social Affairs and Culture restored the shop building to its original design. It was then opened to the public on 21 March 2003. The building received an Honorable Mention in the UNESCO 2004 Asia-Pacific Awards for the Conservation of Cultural Heritage and was selected as an Urban Best Practices Area by Shanghai World Expo 2010.

== Architecture ==
The building consists of two blocks, which are the front block of a three-story pawnshop and a bank and the rear block of a seven-story storehouse.

== See also ==
- List of museums in Macau
