= Grace Wong Kit-cheng =

Chinese-Macau politician

Member of Legislative Assembly of Macau
- Incumbent
- Assumed office October 16, 2017
- Constituency: Direct election

Personal details
- Party: Associação da Construcao Conjunta de Um Bom La: South China Normal UniversityMaster of Applied Psychology; Hong Kong Polytechnic University Bachelor of Nursing; Kiang Wu Nursing College of Macau Advanced nursing degree; Education and Youth Development Bureau Non-higher education Commission（2010-2012）committee member; Education and Youth Development Bureau Non-higher education Commission（2013-2014）committee member; Associação Geral das Mulheres de Macau Vice president; Associação da Construcao Conjunta de Um Bom La President; The Fu Lun Youth Association of Macau President
- Website: macaukit.info

Grace Wong Kit-cheng (simplified Chinese: 黄洁贞; traditional Chinese: 黃潔貞; pinyin: Huáng Jiézhēn) is currently a member of the Legislative Assembly of Macau Special Administrative Region. Deputy head nurse of Kiang Wu Hospital, vice chairman of Associação Geral das Mulheres de Macau, President of Associação da Construcao Conjunta de Um Bom La.

She has been working as a nurse since 2012，and won direct elections in the 2013 Macanese legislative election. In 2017, she formed the "Beautiful Home Alliance" to run for 2017 Macanese legislative election，and was re-elected with 9,496 votes. Wong Kit-cheng pays special attention to women's rights, family development, children's growth and medical treatment. Also concerned about people's livelihood issues, such as housing, prices, transportation and so on. In 2021, she ran again for the 2021 Macanese legislative election with the "Better Home Alliance", and was re-elected with 14,232 votes.

In 2023, she was chosen as one of 29 delegates representing Macau at the 14th National Committee of the Chinese People's Political Consultative Conference.
