= Communications Museum (Macau) =

Museum in Nossa Senhora de Fátima, Macau, China

- 通訊博物館; Museu das Comunicações

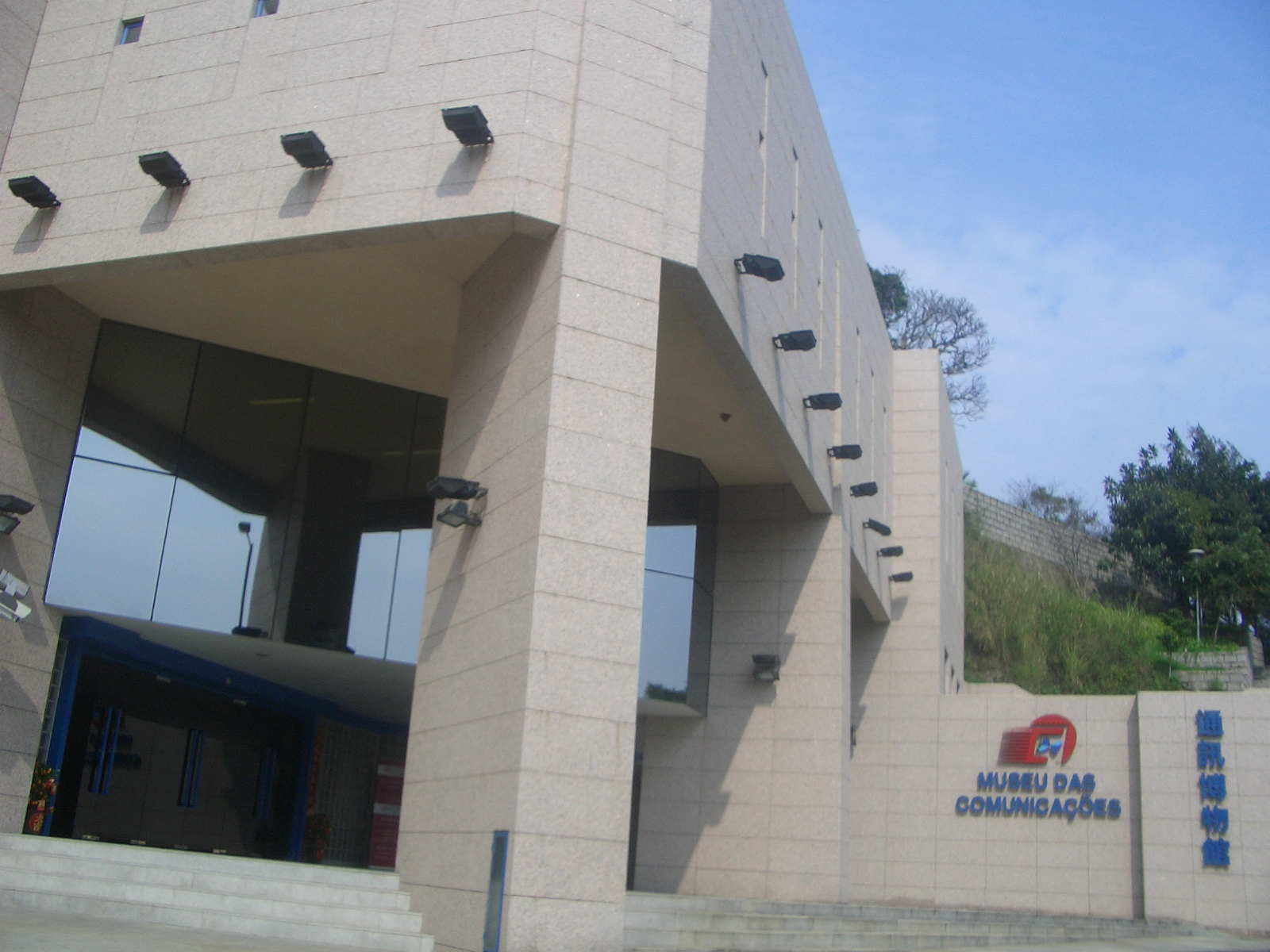
- Established: 1 March 2006
- Location: Nossa Senhora de Fátima, Macau
- Coordinates: 22°12′11.8″N 113°33′17.6″E
- Type: museum
- Owner: Macao Post and Telecommunications Bureau (CTT)
- Website: Official website

Communications Museum

Chinese name
- Traditional Chinese: 通訊博物館
- Simplified Chinese: 通讯博物馆
Transcriptions
Standard Mandarin
- Hanyu Pinyin: Tōngxùn Bówùguǎn
Yue: Cantonese
- Jyutping: tung1 seon3 bok3 mat6 gun2

Portuguese name
- Portuguese: Museu das Comunicações

The Communications Museum (Chinese: 通訊博物館; Portuguese: Museu das Comunicações) is a museum in Nossa Senhora de Fátima, Macau.

== History ==
The museum was inaugurated on 1 March 2006.

== Exhibitions ==
The museum displays various artifacts and equipment about the evolution of long-distance communication systems and techniques, history of Macau Post, scientific exhibits on various technology etc. The museum building consists of Post/Philately Area and Telecommunications Area for its exhibition venues.

== See also ==
- List of museums in Macau
