= Macao Polytechnic University =

College in Sé, Macau, China

Coordinates: 22.193534°N 113.551838°E

- 澳門理工大學; Universidade Politécnica de Macau
- Former names: Polytechnic Institute, University of East Asia (1981-1991); Macao Polytechnic Institute (1991 - Feb 2022)
- Motto: Conhecimento, Experiência, Universalidade
- Motto in English: Knowledge, Expertise, Global Vision
- Type: Public
- Established: 1981; 45 years ago
- Affiliations: Guangdong-Hong Kong-Macao University Alliance (GHMUA)
- Chancellor: Mr. Sam Hou Fai
- Rector: Prof. Im Sio Kei
- Students: 5,881
- Location: Rua de Luís Gonzaga Gomes, Sé, Macau
- Website: Official website
- Location within Macau Location within China

Macao Polytechnic University

Chinese name
- Traditional Chinese: 澳門理工大學
- Simplified Chinese: 澳门理工大学
Transcriptions
Standard Mandarin
- Hanyu Pinyin: Àomén Lǐgōng Dàxué
Yue: Cantonese
- Jyutping: ou3 mun4*2 lei5 gung1 daai6 hok6

Macao Polytechnic Institute
- Traditional Chinese: 澳門理工學院
- Simplified Chinese: 澳门理工学院
Transcriptions
Standard Mandarin
- Hanyu Pinyin: Àomén Lǐgōng Xuéyuàn
Yue: Cantonese
- Jyutping: ou3 mun4*2 lei5 gung1 hok6 jyun6*2

Portuguese name
- Portuguese: Universidade Politécnica de Macau, Instituto Politéchnico de Macau (old)

Macao Polytechnic University (MPU) is a public university in Sé, Macau. It was established in 1981.

== History ==
Macao Polytechnic University was formerly known as the Polytechnic Institute of the University of East Asia. Following the splitting of the University of East Asia into three, the Macao Polytechnic Institute was established in 1991, comprising a number of schools with a long history of public education operation, including the Technical School of the Chinese Affairs Bureau, the Public Administration Training Centre, the Academy of Visual Arts and the Technical School of the Health Bureau.

Prior to 1998 the school's central building used to house the Liceu de Macau, a public Portuguese-curriculum secondary school.

On 16 November 2021, the Chief Executive of MSAR, Ho Iat-seng, delivered the Policy Address of the Government of the MSAR for the financial year 2022, announcing that the institute will be renamed the Macao Polytechnic University. On 1 March 2022, the Macao Polytechnic Institute was officially renamed as Macao Polytechnic University.

== General information ==
There are about 6,000 full-time degree programme students at MPU. Every year, MPU offers various types of training programmes with attendance of over 10,000 people at all levels. Moreover, MPU offers Master's and Doctorate degree programmes in collaboration with the University of California, Los Angeles (UCLA), Queen Mary University of London, University of Lisbon, University of Coimbra, Polytechnic Institute of Leiria, Monash University, University of Bologna, Peking University, Beijing Language and Culture University, Beijing Sport University, Chinese Academy of Governance, China Central Academy of Fine Arts, Shanghai University of Sport, Sun Yat-sen University, Chung Shan Medical University, Taiwan University of Arts, Chinese Culture University, Hong Kong Polytechnic University, Hong Kong Baptist University, and others.

== Faculties and programmes offered ==
Faculty of Applied Sciences	Faculty of Health Sciences and Sports
Doctor of Philosophy in Computer Applied Technology; Doctor of Philosophy in Artificial Intelligence driven Drug Discovery; Doctor of Philosophy in Educational Technology and Innovation; Doctor of Philosophy in Information Science and Technology (Joint Programme with University of Coimbra); Doctor of Philosophy in Computer Science and Engineering (Joint Programme with University of Bologna); Master of Science in Big Data and Internet of Things; Master of Science in Environmental Intelligence; Master of Science in Sports Technology and Innovation; Bachelor of Science in Computing; Bachelor of Science in Artificial Intelligence; Bachelor of Business Administration in Sino-Lusophone Trade Relations	Doctor of Philosophy in Physical Education and Sports Science; Doctor of Philosophy in Physical Education (Joint Programme with Shanghai University of Sport); Master of Science in Sports and Physical Education; Master of Science in Nursing; Master of Physical Education (Joint Programme with Shanghai University of Sport); Master of Science in Medical Laboratory Technology (Joint Programme with Chung Shan Medical University); Postgraduate Diploma in Nursing (Joint Programme with Hong Kong Polytechnic University); Bachelor of Physical Education; Bachelor of Science in Nursing; Bachelor of Science in Biomedical Technology (Medical Laboratory Technology); Bachelor of Science in Biomedical Technology (Pharmacy Technology); Bachelor of Science in Speech-Language Therapy
Faculty of Languages and Translation	Faculty of Arts and Design
Doctor of Philosophy in Portuguese Studies; Doctor of Philosophy in Applied Language Sciences; Doctor of Philosophy in Education (Joint Programme with University of Lisbon); Doctor of Philosophy in Portuguese Culture and Language (Joint Programme with University of Lisbon); Master of Chinese-Portuguese Translation and Interpreting; Master of Foreign Linguistics & Applied Linguistics (Joint Programme with Beijing Language and Culture University); Bachelor of Arts in Chinese-Portuguese/Portuguese-Chinese Translation and Interpretation; Bachelor of Arts in Chinese-English Translation and Interpretation; Bachelor of Arts in International Chinese Language Education; Bachelor of Arts in Portuguese Language	Master of Interdisciplinary Arts; Bachelor of Arts in Design; Bachelor of Arts in Visual Arts; Bachelor of Arts in Music; Bachelor of Arts in Media Arts
Faculty of Humanities and Social Sciences	Faculty of Business
Doctor of Philosophy in Public Policy; Doctor of Philosophy in Cultural Heritage and Anthropology; Master of Public Administration; Master of Education (Cultural Communication and Education); Master of Public Administration (Joint Programme with Chinese Academy of Governance); Master of Government Management (Joint Programme with Chinese Culture University); Bachelor of Social Work; Bachelor of Social Sciences in Public Administration (Chinese); Bachelor of Social Sciences in Public Administration (Portuguese)	Doctor of Business Administration; Master of Business Administration in Gaming Management; Master of Science in Finance with Data Analytics; Master of Business Administration; Bachelor of Accounting; Bachelor of E-Commerce; Bachelor of Management; Bachelor of Business Administration in Marketing; Bachelor of Business Administration in Gaming and Recreation Management
Peking University Health Science Center - Macao Polytechnic University Nursing Academy	
Bachelor of Science in Nursing	

== Academic units and research centres ==
- "One Country Two Systems" Research Centre
- Centre for Gaming and Tourism Studies
- Centre for Portuguese Studies
- Engineering Research Centre of Applied Technology on Machine Translation and Artificial Intelligence
- Teaching and Learning Centre
- Centre for Continuing Education
- Seniors Academy
- Peking University Health Science Center - Macao Polytechnic University Nursing Academy
- Chinese-Portuguese-English Machine Translation Laboratory
- MPU-BELL Centre of English
- Language and Culture Research Centre of Macao (in collaboration with Beijing Language and Culture University and Institute of Applied Linguistics, Ministry of Education)
- Cultural and Creative Industries Teaching and Research Centre
- MPU-UCLA Joint Research Center in Ubiquitous Computing
- MPU-Melco Gaming & Entertainment Information Technology Research & Development Centre
- MPU-UC Joint Research Laboratory in Advanced Technologies for Smart Cities
- Centre of Sino-Western Cultural Studies
- Social, Economic and Public Policy Research Centre
- Centre for Artificial Intelligence Driven Drug Discovery
- International Portuguese Training Centre

== Ranking ==
The university is ranked 901–950th band in the 2026 QS World University Rankings. The university is also ranked 306th in the 2027 QS Asian University Rankings.

University rankings

Global – Overall
- QS World: 901-950 (2026)

Regional – Overall
- QS Asia: 306 (2027)

The university is ranked 301–400th band globally in the 2025 Times Higher Education (THE) World University Impact Rankings.

The university is ranked in the 301–350 band for Linguistics and in the 451–500 band for Computer Science and Information Systems in the QS World University Rankings by Subject 2026.

== International recognition ==
=== Accreditation ===
On 13 February 2014, the university achieved the rating of "confidence", as a judgement of its Institutional Review conducted by the Quality Assurance Agency for Higher Education (QAA), UK. The judgement is equivalent to an excellent level, as awarded similarly to University of Oxford, Queen Mary University of London, etc.

On 29 July 2022, the university was accredited for International Quality Review (IQR) and Institutional Accreditation (IA) by QAA, met ten standards of the European Higher Education Area (ESG), including two good practices (student research and innovation as well as its comprehensive talent cultivation model) were recognised.

=== Programme reviews and professional recognition ===
Most of the programmes offered by the university have gained international recognition from various review and accreditation agencies/institutions:

Programme	Institution Recognised
Bachelor of Science in Computing; Master of Science in Big Data and Internet of Things	The Institution of Engineering and Technology (IET), UK; Engineering Council, UK
Bachelor of Social Sciences in Public Administration (Portuguese); Bachelor of Arts in Chinese-Portuguese/Portuguese-Chinese Translation and Interpretation; Bachelor of Science in Biomedical Technology (Medical Laboratory Technology); Bachelor of Science in Biomedical Technology (Pharmacy Technology); Bachelor of Management	Agency for Assessment and Accreditation of Higher Education (A3ES)
Bachelor of Accounting	Association of Chartered Certified Accountants (ACCA); CPA Australia; Hong Kong Council for Accreditation of Academic & Vocational Qualifications (HKCAAVQ)
Master of Science in Finance with Data Analytics	CFA Institute
Bachelor of Social Work; Bachelor of Business Administration in Gaming and Recreation Management	Hong Kong Council for Accreditation of Academic & Vocational Qualifications (HKCAAVQ)
Bachelor of E-Commerce	Institute of Certified E-Commerce Consultants (ICECC)
Bachelor of Arts in Chinese-English Translation and Interpretation	Academic Quality Agency for New Zealand Universities (AQA)
Bachelor of Science in Nursing	Quality Assurance Agency for Higher Education (QAA), UK
Bachelor of Arts in Music; Bachelor of Arts in Visual Arts; Bachelor of Arts in Design; Bachelor of Physical Education	Higher Education Evaluation & Accreditation Council of Taiwan (HEEACT)
Bachelor of Social Sciences in Public Administration (Chinese)	Education Quality Evaluation Agency of the Ministry of Education of China (EQEA) (formerly Higher Education Evaluation Center of the Ministry of Education of China (HEEC))
Bachelor of Business Administration in Gaming and Recreation Management; Master of Business Administration	UN Tourism TedQual

=== Other recognition and honors ===
The university is the only higher education institution in the country to receive the "APQN Quality Awards" by the Asia-Pacific Quality Network (APQN) four times:

- Best/Model Internal QA Award (2015 & 2017)
- Best Practice of QA during COVID pandemic (2022)

The university won the National Teaching Achievement Award, the highest level award established by the Ministry of Education of the People's Republic of China, in 2019 and 2023, making it the first and only higher education institution in Macao to receive this award twice.

Chinese Universities Alumni Association (CUAA) released the annual "Evaluation and Study Report of Universities in China". The university was rated as a four-star university from 2017 to 2022 consecutively, ranking among China's high-level universities.

The university won the prestigious Times Higher Education (THE) Awards Asia 2026 in the “International Strategy of the Year” category.

== See also ==
- Macao Polytechnic University Multisport Pavilion
- List of universities and colleges in Macau
