= Sé, Macau =

Coordinates: 22.1909°N 113.5473°E

Sé 大堂區 Cathedral
- Freguesia
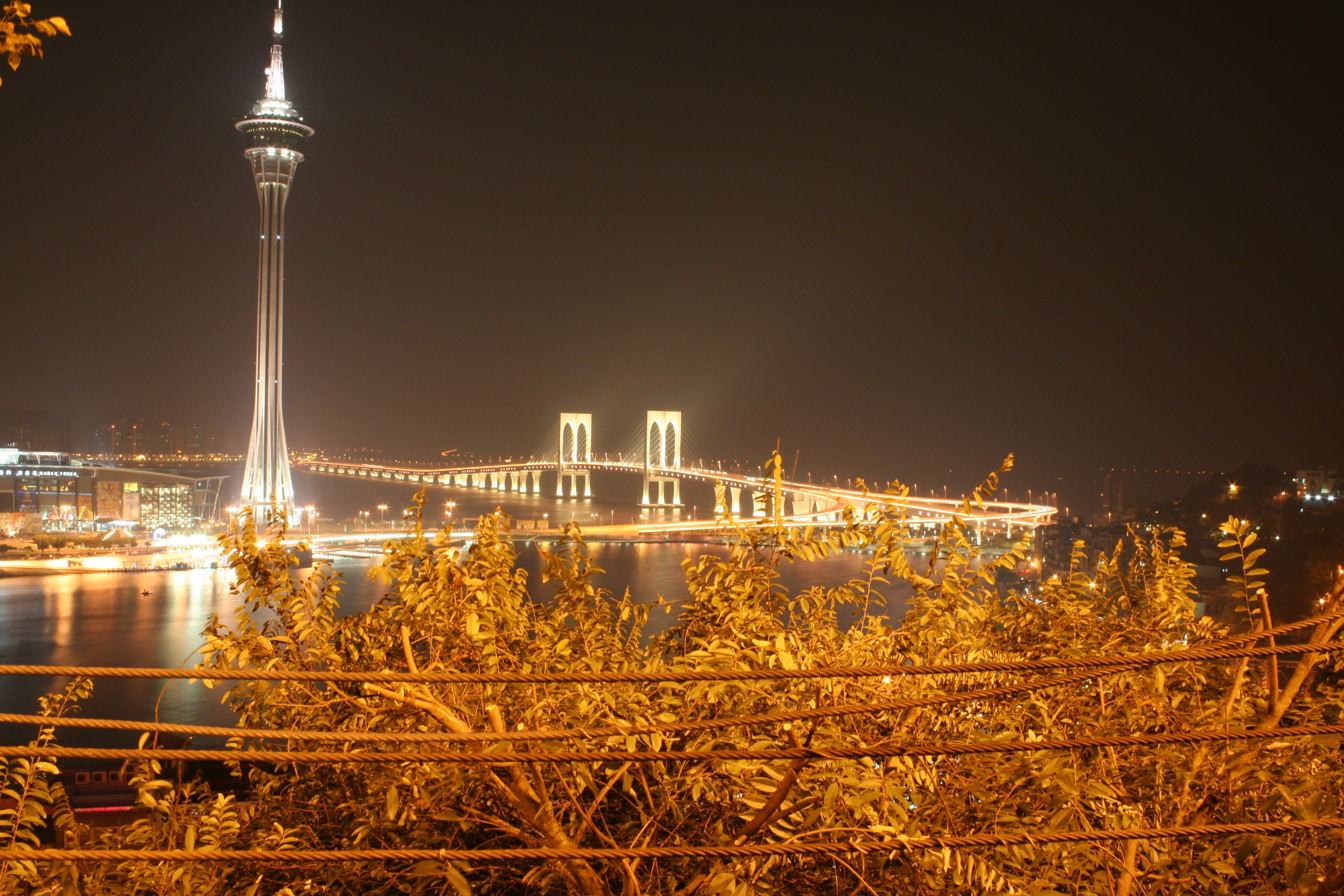
- Macau Tower

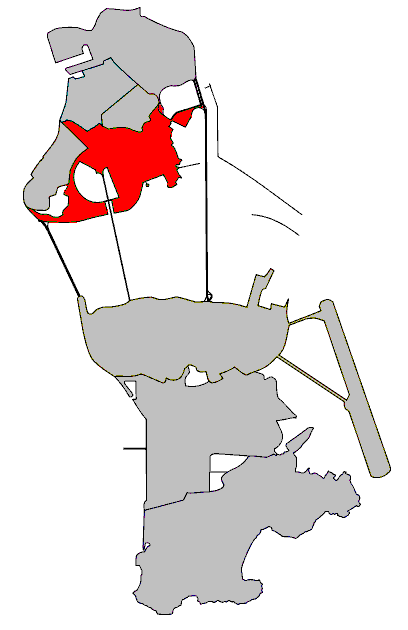
- Freguesia da Sé in Macau
- Country: China
- Region: Macao

Area
  - Total: 3.4 km^{2} (1.3 sq mi)

Population (2013)
  - Total: 52,200
  - Density: 15,000/km^{2} (40,000/sq mi)
- Time zone: UTC+8 (Macau Standard)

Freguesia da Sé

Chinese name
- Traditional Chinese: 大堂區
- Simplified Chinese: 大堂区
- Jyutping: Daai^{6} Tong^{4} Keoi^{1}
- Hanyu Pinyin: Dà Tángqū
Transcriptions
Standard Mandarin
- Hanyu Pinyin: Dà Tángqū
- Yale Romanization: Dà Tángchyū
- IPA: [tâ tʰǎŋtɕʰý]
Yue: Cantonese
- Yale Romanization: Daaih Tòngkeú
- Jyutping: Daai^{6} Tong^{4} Keoi^{1}
- IPA: [tàːi tʰɔ̏ːŋkʰœ́ː]

Portuguese name
- Portuguese: Freguesia da Sé

Sé ([ˈsɛ], lit. 'Cathedral') is a southeast civil parish in the Macau Peninsula of Macau. It is the second largest peninsular district in Macau after the civil parish of Nossa Senhora de Fátima. The parish area is named for the Cathedral of the Nativity of Our Lady, Macau.

This parish was one of five in the former Municipality of Macau, one of Macau's two municipalities that were abolished on 31 December 2001 by Law No. 17/2001, following the 1999 handover of Macau from Portugal to China. While their administrative functions have since been removed, these parishes are still retained nominally.

Its western part is the historic financial center of Macau. Praia Grande Central Business District (南灣中心商業區) is in the south-central part of the district. All banks (over 20) in Macau have offices here.

There are numerous quality restaurants, and 4- and 5-star hotels in this district. High-rise buildings exist on the eastern ZAPE and NAPE zone, which was reclaimed from the sea, with a ferry terminal located on the eastern edge of the parish.

== Institutions ==
Macau government:

- Legislative Assembly of Macau
- Macau General Post Office
- Various government agencies in China Plaza, including the Identification Services Bureau
- Statistics and Census Service
- Education and Youth Development Bureau head office
- Civil Aviation Authority head office: 18th floor of the Cheng Feng Commercial Center (誠豐商業中心, Centro Comercial Cheng Feng)

PRC Central Government:

- Liaison Office of the Central People's Government in the Macau SAR
- Office of the Commissioner of the Ministry of Foreign Affairs of the People's Republic of China in the Macao Special Administrative Region

Diplomatic missions:

- Taipei Economic and Cultural Office in Macau
- Philippine Consulate General in Macau SAR
- Consulate General of Portugal in Macau and Hong Kong
- Consulate General of Angola Macau SAR
- Consulate General of Mozambique in Macau SAR

== Economy ==
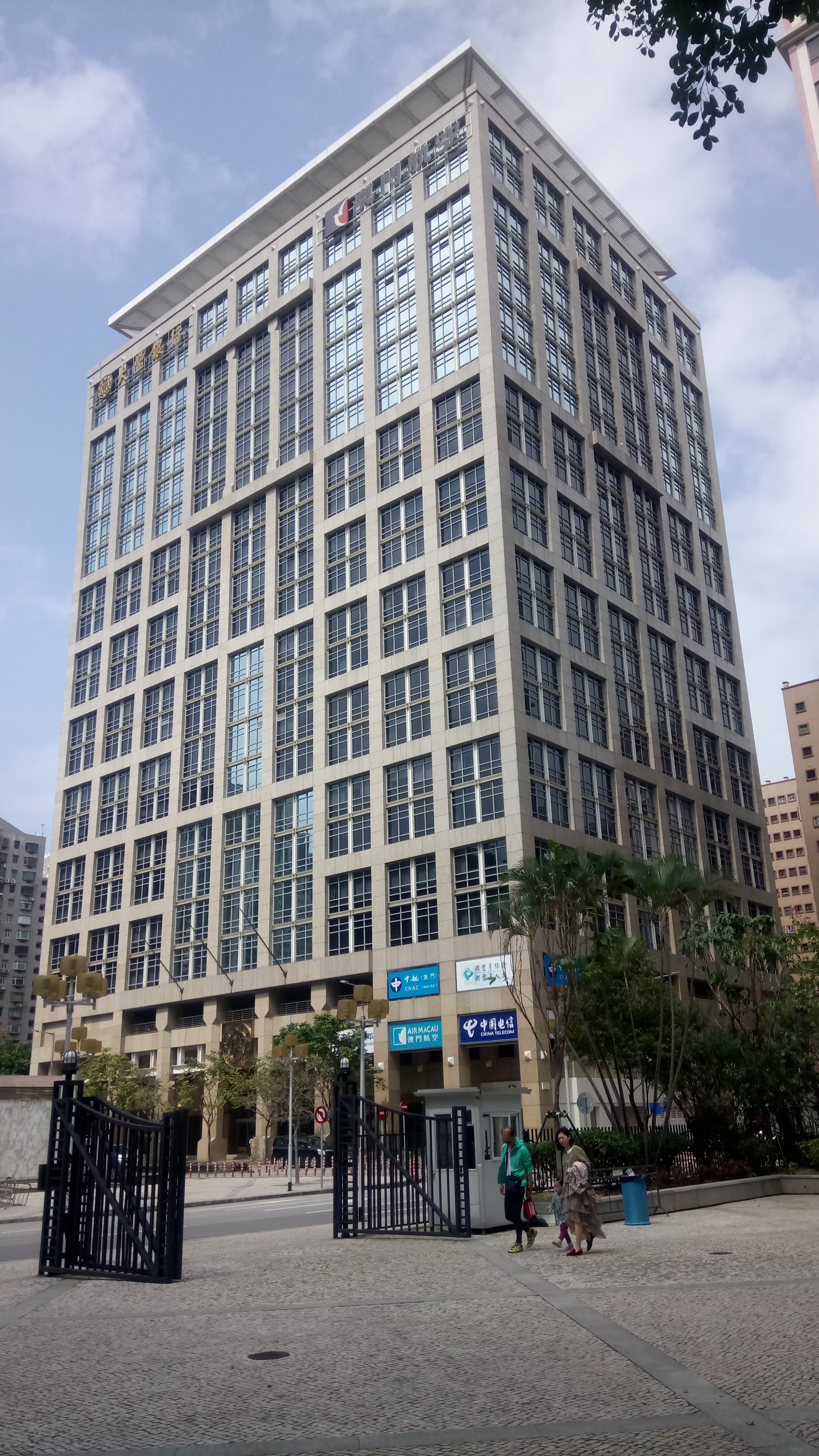
Edifício CNAC, the Air Macau head office

Within the parish is the Edifício CNAC (中航大廈; zung1 hong4 daai6 haa6), the head office of Air Macau. Previously the Air Macau head office was in the Edifício Tai Wah (大華大廈) in Sé.

== Media ==
O Clarim has its head office in Edf. Ngan Fai (銀輝大廈) in Sé. Ponto Final has its head office at Travessa do Bispo, nº1.

== Healthcare ==
Macau's public hospital, Conde S. Januário Hospital, is in Sé. The Macau government also operates the Centro de Saúde Porto Interior (海傍區衛生中心) in Hoi Pong Koi.

== Education ==
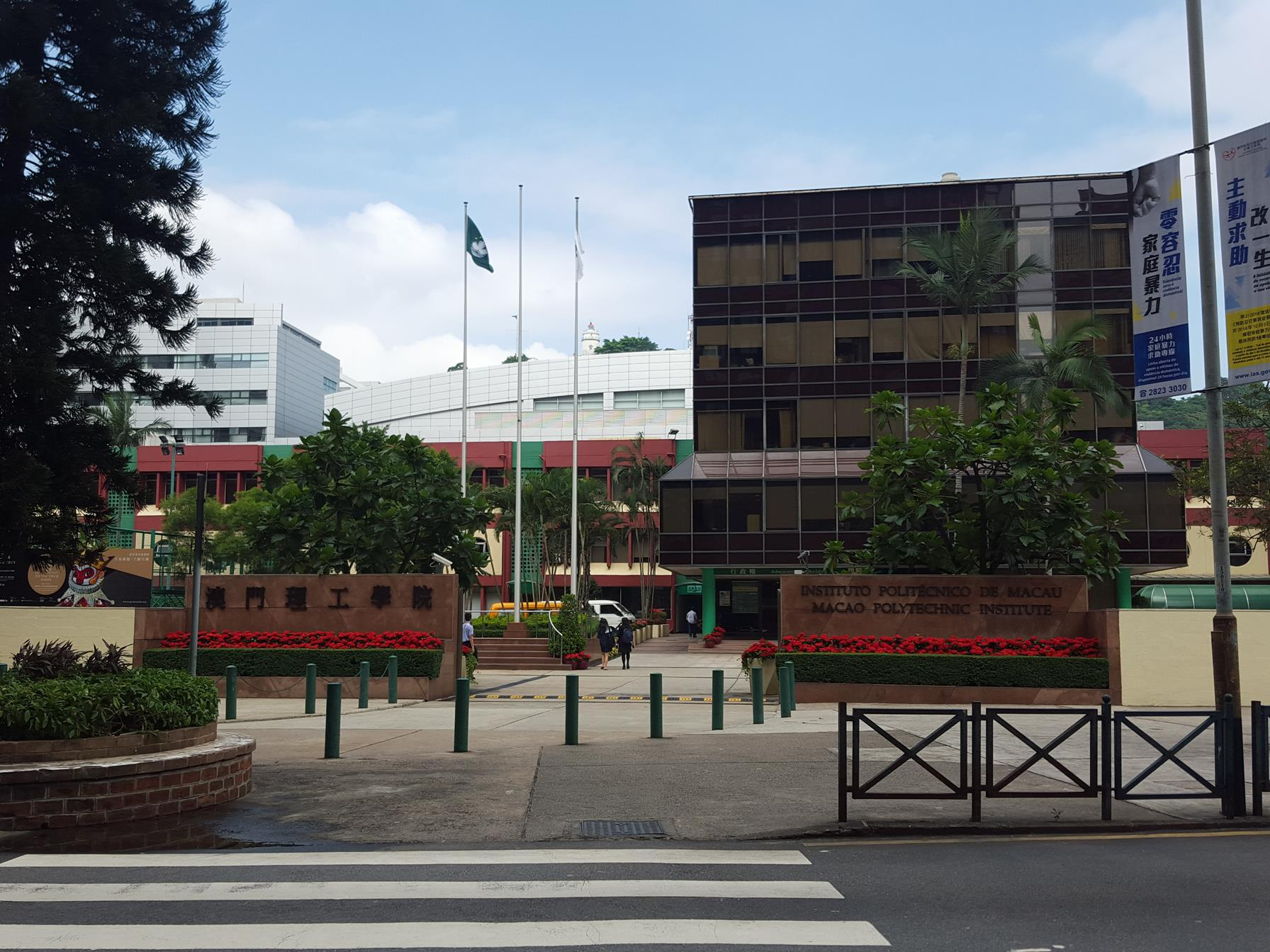
Macao Polytechnic University (former Macao Polytechnic Institute / Liceu de Macau)

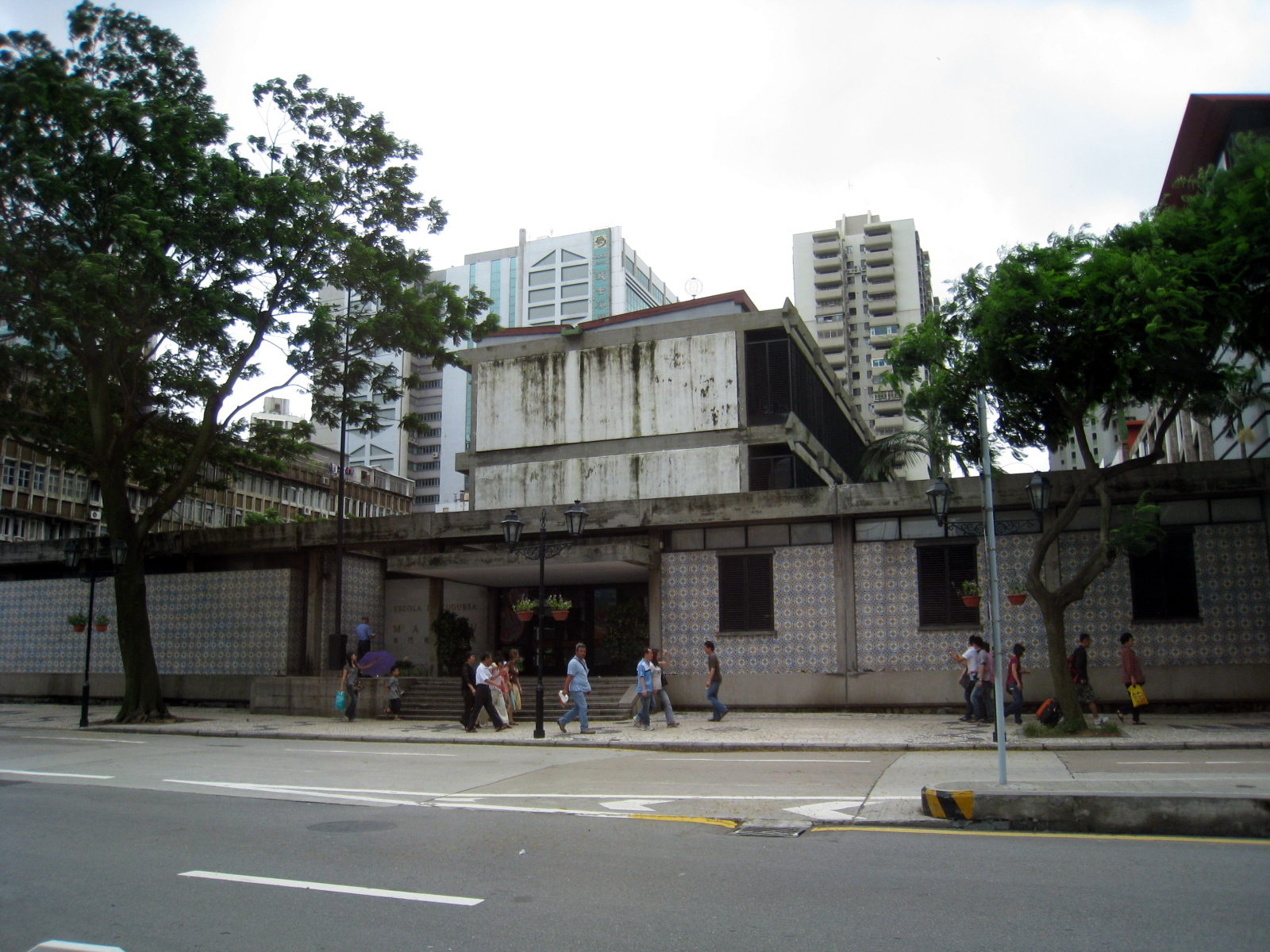
Macau Portuguese School

Macao Polytechnic University in Sé provides tertiary education. Prior to 1998 the school's central building was used as the Liceu de Macau, a public Portuguese-curriculum secondary school.

=== Primary and secondary schools ===
The sole public school currently in operation in Sé is the Macao Conservatory School of Dance, as it is categorized by the Education and Youth Affairs Bureau as a public secondary school program. It is located on the 3rd and 4th floor of the Edifício Centro Hotline (獲多利中心). The conservatory's theater school is also in Sé, within the Edificio Jardim San On (新安花園).

Tuition-free private primary and secondary schools

- Colégio de Santa Rosa de Lima (聖羅撒女子中學) Chinese section - Preschool through secondary school
- Colégio de Santa Rosa de Lima English section (聖羅撒英文中學) - Primary and secondary school
- Concordia School for Special Education (Escola Concórdia para Ensino Especial; 協同特殊教育學校) - Preschool through secondary school and special education, located on the ground floor to third floor of Edificio Chu Kuan (珠光大廈)
- Kao Yip Middle School - Preschool through secondary school
- Lingnan Middle School (Escola Ling Nam; 澳門嶺南中學) - Preschool through secondary school
- Macau Pooi To Middle School (Escola Pui Tou de Macau; 澳門培道中學) - Main campus, preschool through secondary school
- Escola Tong Sin Tong (同善堂中學) - Preschool through secondary
- Sheng Kung Hui Choi Kou School Macau (Sheng Kung Hui Escola Choi Kou (Macau); 聖公會(澳門)蔡高中學) Preschool and night secondary school campus

Previously the nursery/primary campus of Macau Baptist College (MBC; Escola Cham Son de Macau; 澳門浸信中學) was located in Sé.

Private non-free preschools and primary and secondary schools

- Colégio Diocesano de São José (聖若瑟教區中學)
- Millennium Secondary School (Escola Secundária Millennium; 創新中學) - Senior high school
- Macau Portuguese School - Primary and secondary school
- St. Anthony's Kindergarten and Nursery (Centro de Educação Infantil Santo António; 聖安東尼幼稚園)

=== Colleges and universities ===
The original campus (NAPE1) of the University of Saint Joseph is in Sé. The main campus of the Macau Polytechnic University is also located in Sé.

=== Public library ===
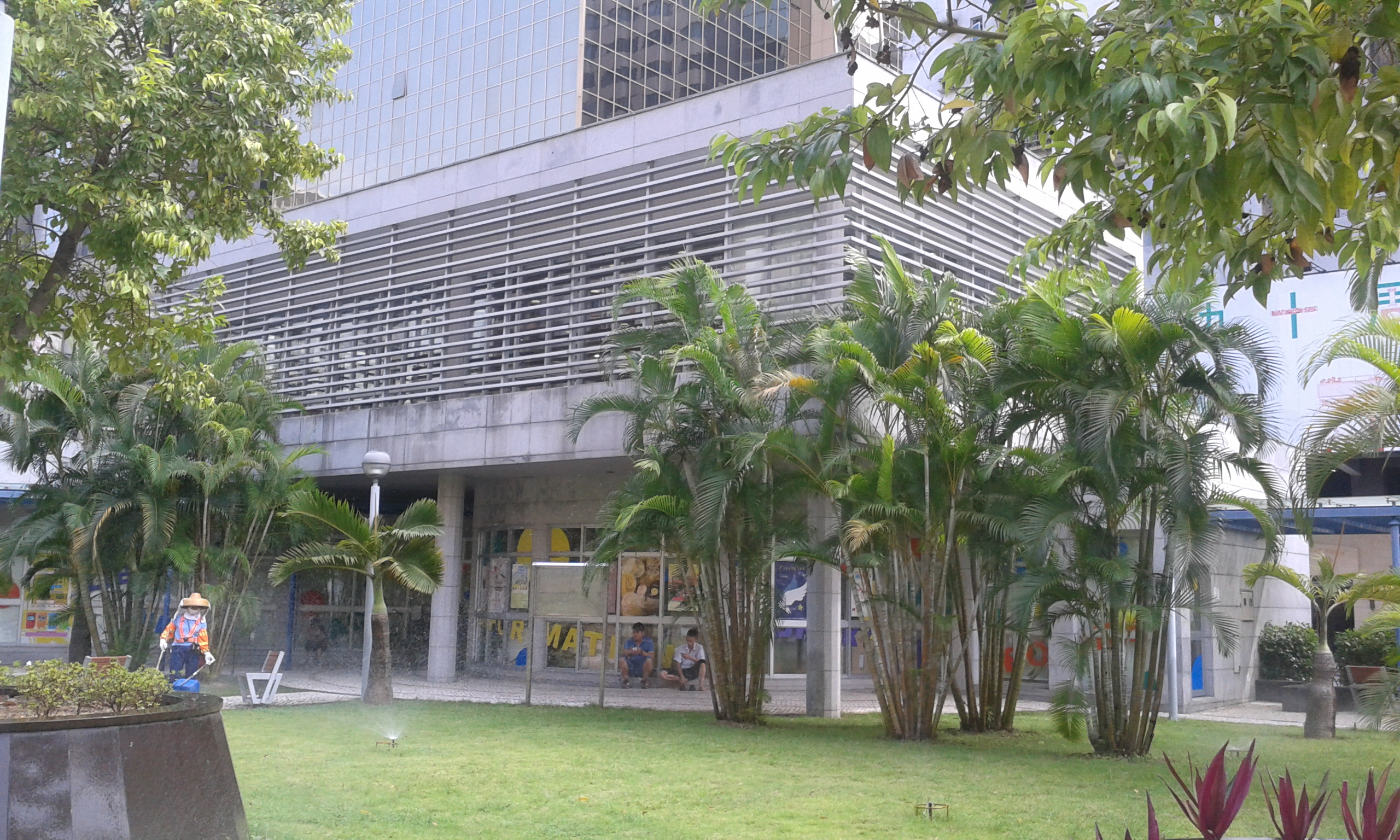
Library in Ho Yin Garden

The parish is home the Macao Public Library system's Library in Ho Yin Garden (Biblioteca do Jardim Comendador Ho Yin, 何賢公園圖書館). The library, a 368-square-metre (3,960 sq ft) two story facility, first opened in 1993. It reopened on 10 February 2009 after it had been temporarily closed in 2005 for NAPE renovations.

== Casino and hotels ==
- Casa Real Casino
- Casino Lisboa
- Grand Lisboa
- L'Arc Macau
- Mandarin Oriental, Macau
- MGM Macau
- Wynn Macau

== Tourist attractions ==
- Comendador Ho Yin Garden
- Dr. Carlos d'Assumpção Park
- Garden of the Arts
- Grand Prix Museum
- Handover Gifts Museum of Macao
- Heritage Exhibition of a Traditional Pawnshop Business
- Kuan Tai Temple
- Lotus Square
- Macao Cultural Centre
- Macau Fisherman's Wharf
- Macau Forum
- Macau Military Club
- Macau Museum of Art
- Macau Science Center
- Macau Tower
- Macau Wine Museum
- Nam Van Lake
- Sai Van Lake
- Sands Macao
- Santa Casa da Misericórdia
- Sé Church
- Senado Square
- St. Dominic's Church

== Transport ==
- Ferries to Hong Kong and mainland China leave from the Outer Harbour Ferry Terminal.
- There is an extensive and frequent bus network in the district, with key stops at Praça de Ferreira do Amaral, Rua do Campo, and Praceta 24 de Junho.

== See also ==
- Avenida Almeida Ribeiro
