= St. Dominic's Church, Macau =

Saint Dominic's Church
- 板樟堂; Igreja de São Domingos
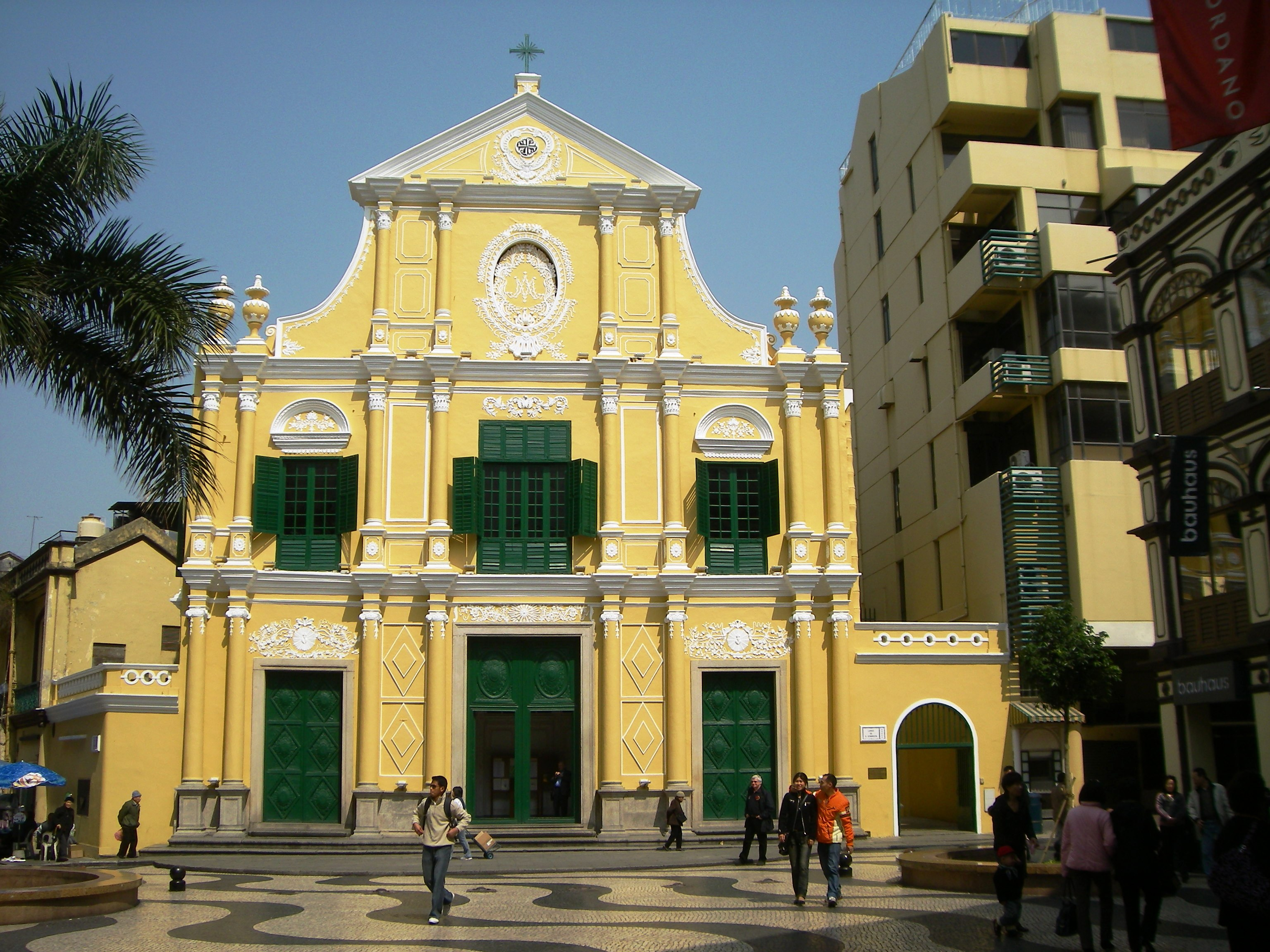
- Igreja de São Domingos
- Saint Dominic's Church
- 22°11′41″N 113°32′26″E
- Location: Largo de São Domingos, Sé, Macau, China
- Denomination: Roman Catholic

History
- Status: Parish church

Architecture
- Functional status: Active
- Style: Baroque
- Completed: 1587

Administration
- Diocese: Roman Catholic Diocese of Macau
- Parish: Cathedral Parish

Clergy
- Bishop: Stephen Lee Bun-sang

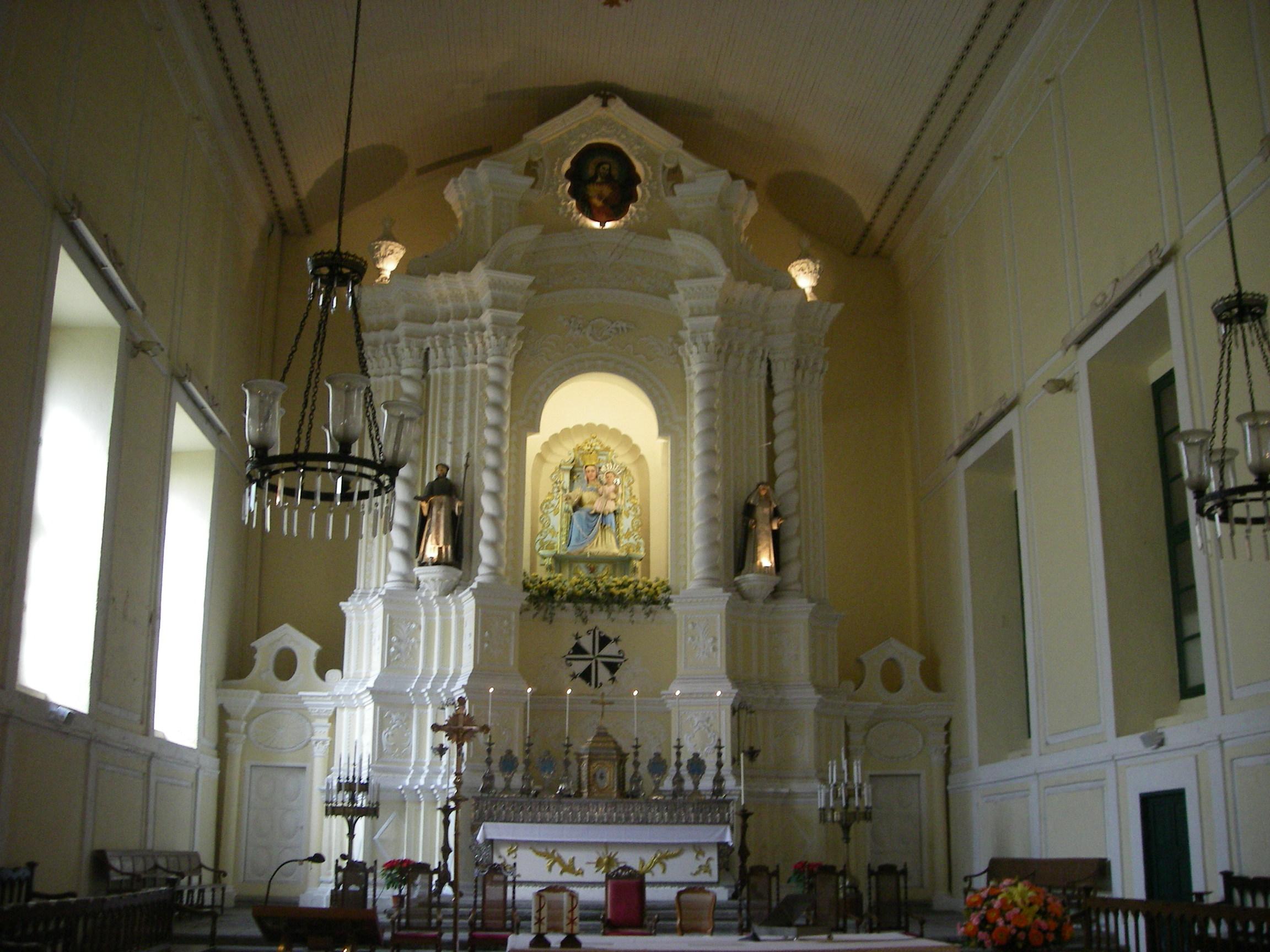
The high altar and reredos of St Dominic's Church.

Saint Dominic's Church (Chinese: 板樟堂; Portuguese: Igreja de São Domingos) is a late 16th-century Baroque-style church that serves within the Cathedral Parish of the Roman Catholic Diocese of Macau. It is in the peninsular part of the city at the Largo de São Domingos, near the Leal Senado Building.

It was finished in 1587 and overseen by three Spanish Dominican priests. Due to renovations and reconstruction, the current structure dates from the early 17th century. The church is one of the classified immovable properties of Macau. It is one of 29 sites forming the Historic Centre of Macau, a UNESCO World Heritage Site.

== History ==
The church was established in 1587 by three Spanish Dominican priests who arrived from Acapulco, Mexico. It was the scene of violence in 1644, when a Spanish officer—loyal to the King of Spain and opposing the colony's determination to stay allegiant with Portugal after the dissolution of the Iberian Union—entered the church in order to seek refuge from an angry mob. He was promptly murdered at the foot of the altar while mass was being celebrated. Sixty-three years later, in 1707, the Dominicans supported the Pope's stance with regards to the Chinese Rites controversy. This was in opposition and defiance to the view of the Bishop of Macau, who subsequently excommunicated them. When soldiers were sent to the church in order to uphold this ruling, the friars responded by closing the church for three days and throwing rocks to repel them.

The first Portuguese-language newspaper in China—A Abelha da China (The China Bee)—was published at St. Dominic's on September 12, 1822. The church closed down in 1834 when monastic orders were dissolved and expropriated to the government, who then converted it into barracks, a stable and an office for public works. However, it later reopened and was given many works of sacred art from other religious orders dissolved back in Portugal.

The church underwent renovation in 1997 and a museum was added alongside the church.

== Architecture ==
The church of St. Dominic was built in a Baroque style and is noted for its mixture of European and local Macanese features in its design. This is demonstrated in the church's use of Chinese-style roof tiles and doors made of teak. The church's high altar features a statue of the Madonna and Child as the centrepiece and is flanked by wood and ivory-carved statues of several saints.

== Museum ==
The Treasure of Sacred Art Museum was established as part of the 1997 renovation and is located inside the church's bell tower. It contains approximately 300 religious works of art and artifacts.

== See also ==
- List of oldest buildings and structures in Macau
- Religion in Macau
