= List of museums in Macau =

The following is an incomplete list of museums in Macau.

== List ==
Name	Photo	Date established	Location
Communications Museum		March 1, 2006	Nossa Senhora de Fátima
Fire Services Museum, Macau		December 11, 1999	Santo António
Grand Prix Museum		November 18, 1993	Sé
Handover Gifts Museum of Macao		December 30, 2004	Sé
Heritage Exhibition of a Traditional Pawnshop Business		March 21, 2003	Sé
Lin Zexu Memorial Museum of Macau		November 1997	Nossa Senhora de Fátima
Macau Museum		April 18, 1998	Santo António
Macau Museum of Art		March 19, 1999	Sé
Macau Science Center		January 25, 2010	Sé
Macau Tea Culture House		June 1, 2005	São Lázaro
Macau Wine Museum		December 25, 1995	Sé
Maritime Museum		June 24, 1990	São Lourenço
Museum of Sacred Art and Crypt		October 23, 1996	Santo António
Museum of Taipa and Coloane History		May 7, 2006	Taipa
Natural and Agrarian Museum		March 21, 1997	Coloane
Poly MGM Museum		November 2, 2024	Sé
Taipa Houses–Museum		December 5, 1999	Taipa

== See also ==
- Tourism in Macau
- History of Macau
- Culture of Macau
- List of museums
