= Sovereignty at the Edge =

First edition

Sovereignty at the Edge: Macau and the Question of Chineseness is a 2010 book by Cathryn H. Clayton, published by the Harvard University Asia Center. It discusses the Handover of Macau from Portugal to the People's Republic of China and the associated processes.

According to Sin Wen Lau of Australia National University, the book's focus is a cultural identity for the Chinese population in Macau promoted by the Portuguese government.

== Background ==
The author, an anthropologist at the University of Hawaii, conducted fieldwork for two years, including six weeks in the summer of 1999, months prior to the handover of Macau. She interviewed teachers and administrators in Macau schools, and she also interviewed visitors to the Museum of Macau.

== Contents ==
The book includes an introduction, five body chapters, and a conclusion. Each chapter discusses a different aspect of the 1999 handover process. The initial three chapters discuss sociocultural aspects, while the following three discuss the creation of a Macau identity.

Chapter 1 discusses the creation of Portuguese governance over Macau, described by the author as being jointly "shared and contested" instead of belonging entirely to one country.

Chapter 2, "Outlaw Tales," discusses the prevalence of organised crime in pre-handover Macau and the perceived inability of the Portuguese authorities to control it.

Chapter 3 outlined the political complications of nationality in Macau, the definition of Chinese-ness, the identity of the Macanese people, and the 1999 Resolution on Nationality. In particular the Macanese people could choose between Chinese and Portuguese nationalities, something some of the Chinese without Portuguese ancestry were unable to do, but it prevented them from having the ambiguous identity they had for a period.

Chapter 4 discusses the overall unwillingness in Macau schools to teach the history of Macau, due to political controversies, a lack of consensus over what happened, a relative unimportance, and the necessity to prepare for examinations in other subjects. Yuan-Horng Chu (Chinese: 朱元鴻; pinyin: Zhū Yuánhóng) of National Chiao Tung University stated "For Clayton, that the very idea of teaching local history would be so controversial tells of the contestation and volatility of the local in a place and time at the edges of sovereignty."

Chapter 5 discusses how places are named, the nostalgia around them, and how the groups of Macau experience them. The Chinese population largely was unaware of the Portuguese names of places, including streets, which differ from the names of the places in Chinese. The author stated that this shows, in regards to most people living in Macau, the Portuguese sovereignty had "irrelevance".

Chapter 6 outlines how the Museum of Macao presents history and how this affects the view of sovereignty in Macau. The author stated that the people living in Macau perceived history differently despite the museum's attempt to have a single unified history.

Chapter 7 discusses the "Outlawed Tales", including a history of a family, a play, and an opinion, which reflect Macau residents' own views of themselves, their residence, and sovereignty.

The book's conclusion discusses the handover of Macau, including the coordination involved between the two parties.

== Reception ==
Eva Po Wah Hung (Chinese: 孔寶華) of the University of Macau argued that the book was "very well-written". Arguing that the Portuguese colonisation of Macau had not accomplished its goals, Hung stated that she disagreed with the author's interpretation of Macau history being "representing a more flexible type of sovereignty."

Lau stated that "The argument presented is sensitive, sophisticated and grounded in thick description."

R. E. Entenmann of St. Olaf College stated that the book was "thoughtful and nuanced", rating it two stars and giving it a recommendation. Citing a large usage of first-person pronouns, he stated that the book was "highly anecdotal and personal".

== See also ==
- History of Macau
