= Education and Youth Affairs Bureau =

Education agency of Macau, 1999–2021

- Direcção dos Serviços de Educação e Juventude 教育暨青年局
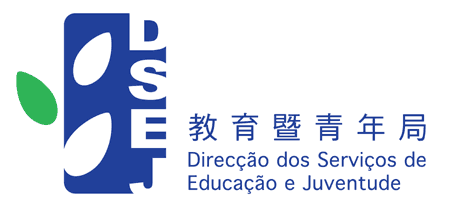

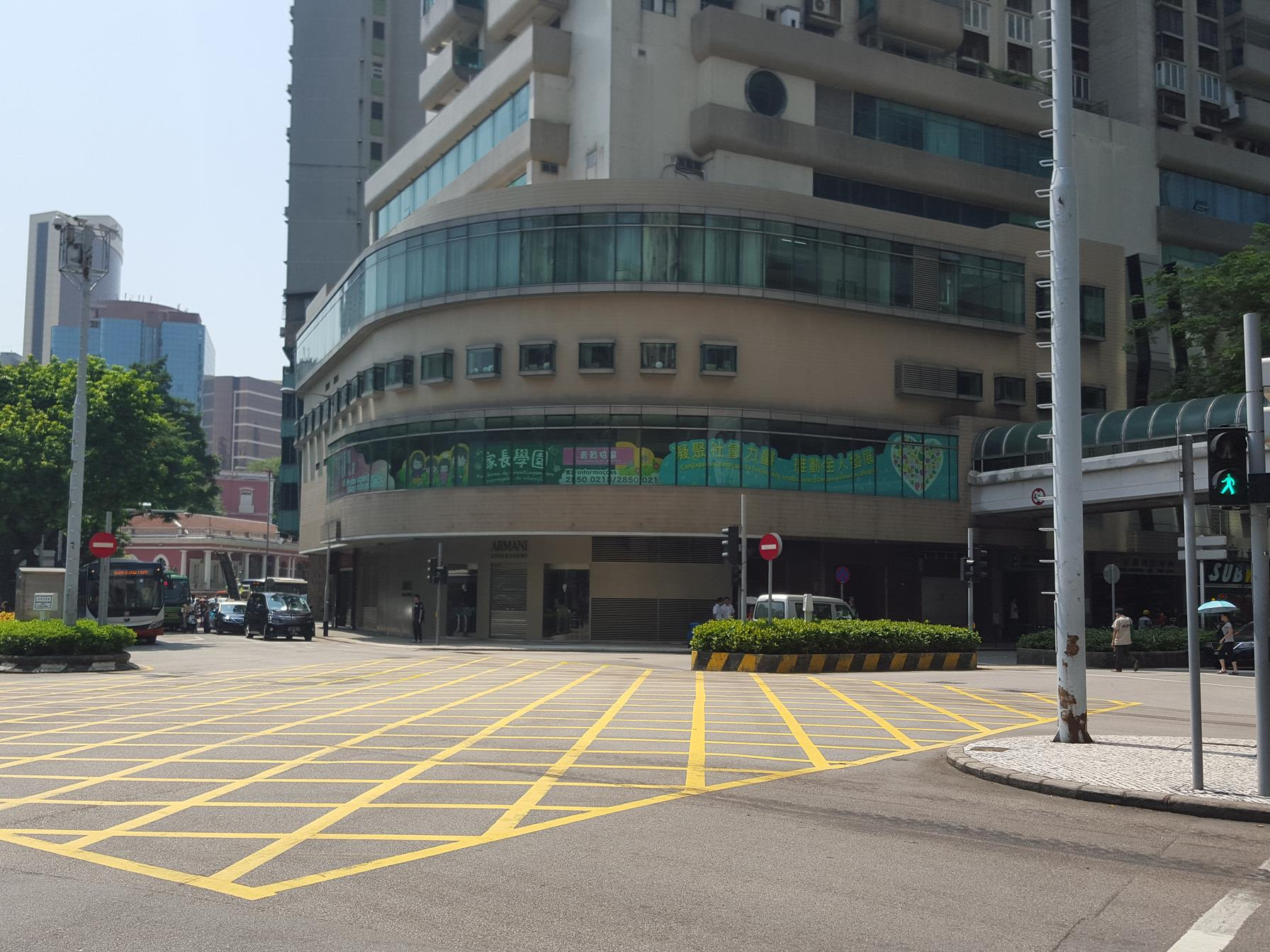

Agency overview
- Formed: 1999
- Dissolved: February 1, 2021
- Superseding agency: Education and Youth Development Bureau
- Jurisdiction: Government of Macau
- Headquarters: Avenida de D. João IV, n.os 7-9, 1.º andar, Macau

Education and Youth Affairs Bureau

Chinese name
- Chinese: 教育暨青年局
Transcriptions
Standard Mandarin
- Hanyu Pinyin: Jiàoyù jì Qīngnián Jú
Yue: Cantonese
- Jyutping: gaau3 juk6 kei3 cing1 nin4 guk6

Direcção dos Serviços de Educação e Juventude (Different Chinese name)
- Chinese: 教育暨青年司
Transcriptions
Standard Mandarin
- Hanyu Pinyin: Jiàoyù jì Qīngnián Sī
Yue: Cantonese
- Jyutping: gaau3 juk6 kei3 cing1 nin4 si1

Portuguese name
- Portuguese: Direcção dos Serviços de Educação e Juventude

Education and Youth Affairs Bureau (Portuguese: Direcção dos Serviços de Educação e Juventude or DSEJ; Chinese: 教育暨青年局) was the education agency of Macau. It merged with the Higher Education Bureau, becoming the Education and Youth Development Bureau, in 2021.
