= Macau Museum of Art =

Museum in Sé, Macau, China

- 澳門藝術博物館 (Chinese); Museu de Arte de Macau (Portuguese)

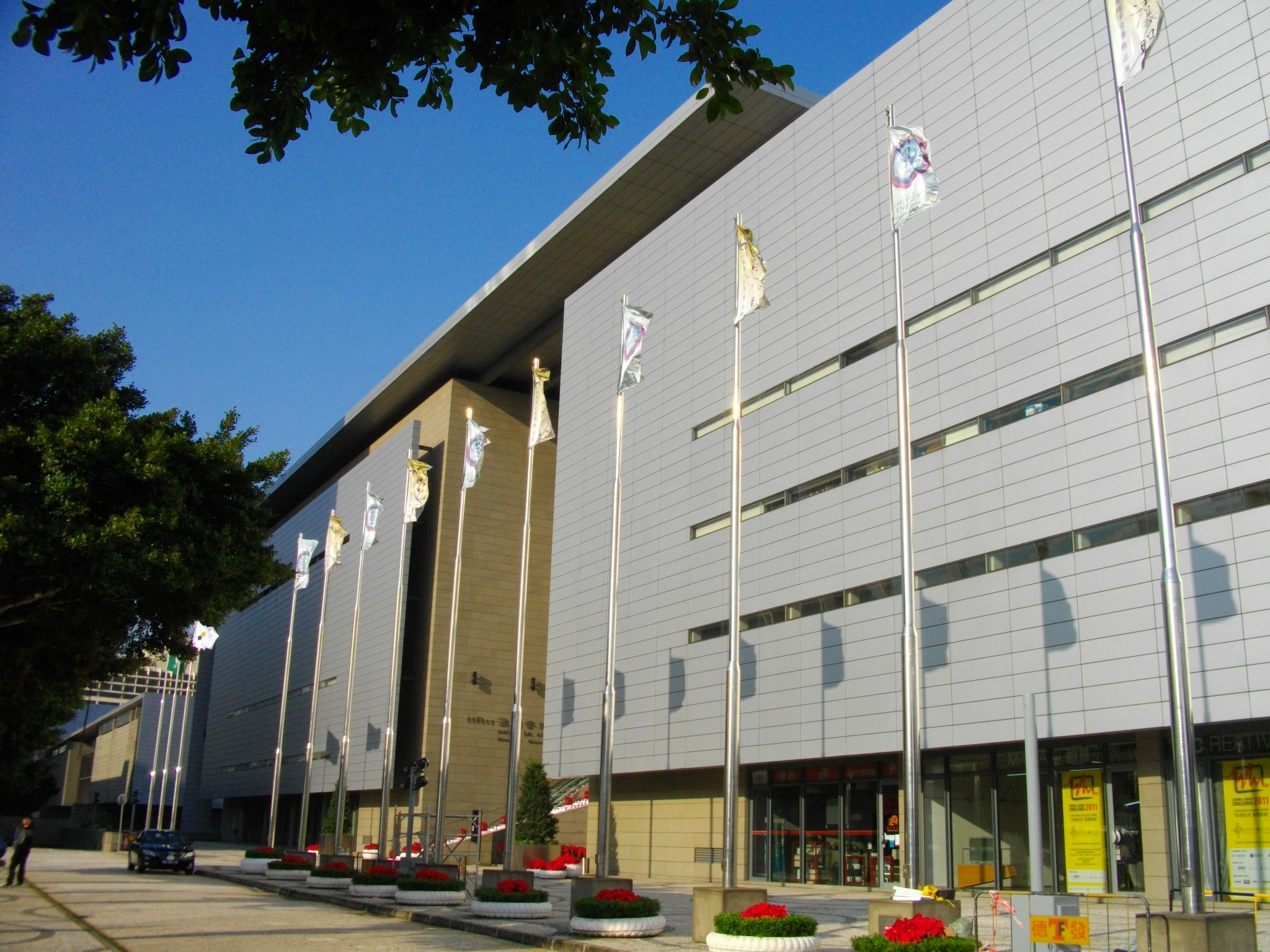
- Established: 19 March 1999
- Location: Sé, Macau, China
- Coordinates: 22°11′20.1″N 113°33′18.8″E
- Type: art museum
- Website: Official website

Macau Museum of Art
- Traditional Chinese: 澳門藝術博物館
- Simplified Chinese: 澳门艺术博物馆
Transcriptions
Yue: Cantonese
- Jyutping: ou3 mun4 ngai6 seot6 bok3 mat6 gun2

The Macau Museum of Art (MAM; Chinese: 澳門藝術博物館; Portuguese: Museu de Arte de Macau) is an art museum in Sé, Macau established on 19 March 1999.

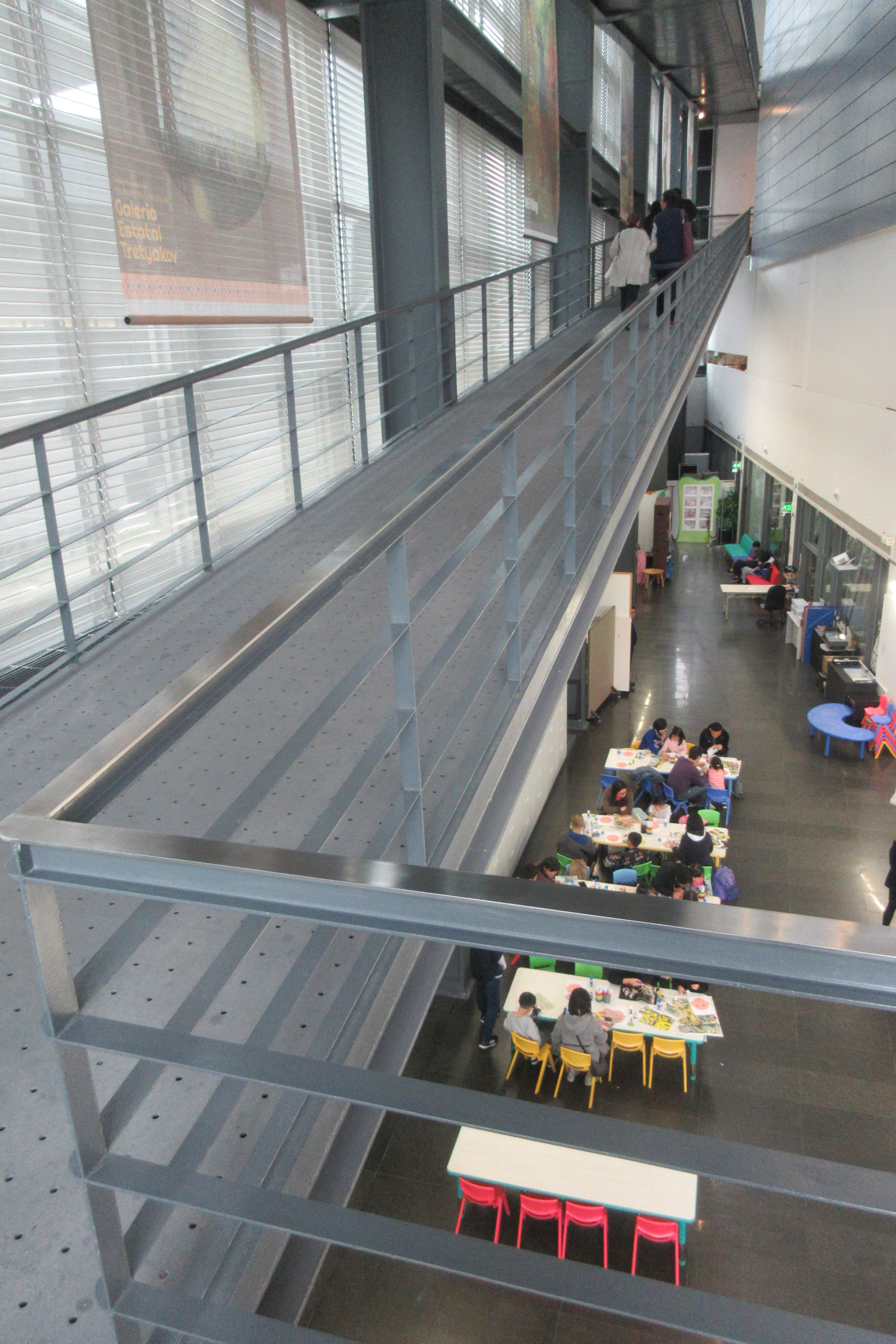
Skywalk

== Architecture ==
The museum building spans over 10,192 m^{2} with 4,000 m^{2} of exhibition area. The Museum is a five-storey building with different types of exhibition areas: spaces for Chinese traditional art are located on the 4th floor; the collections of MAM are displayed on the 3rd floor; a large special gallery is on the 2nd floor.

== Exhibitions ==
- Determined Spirit – Calligraphy and Painting of Fu Shen
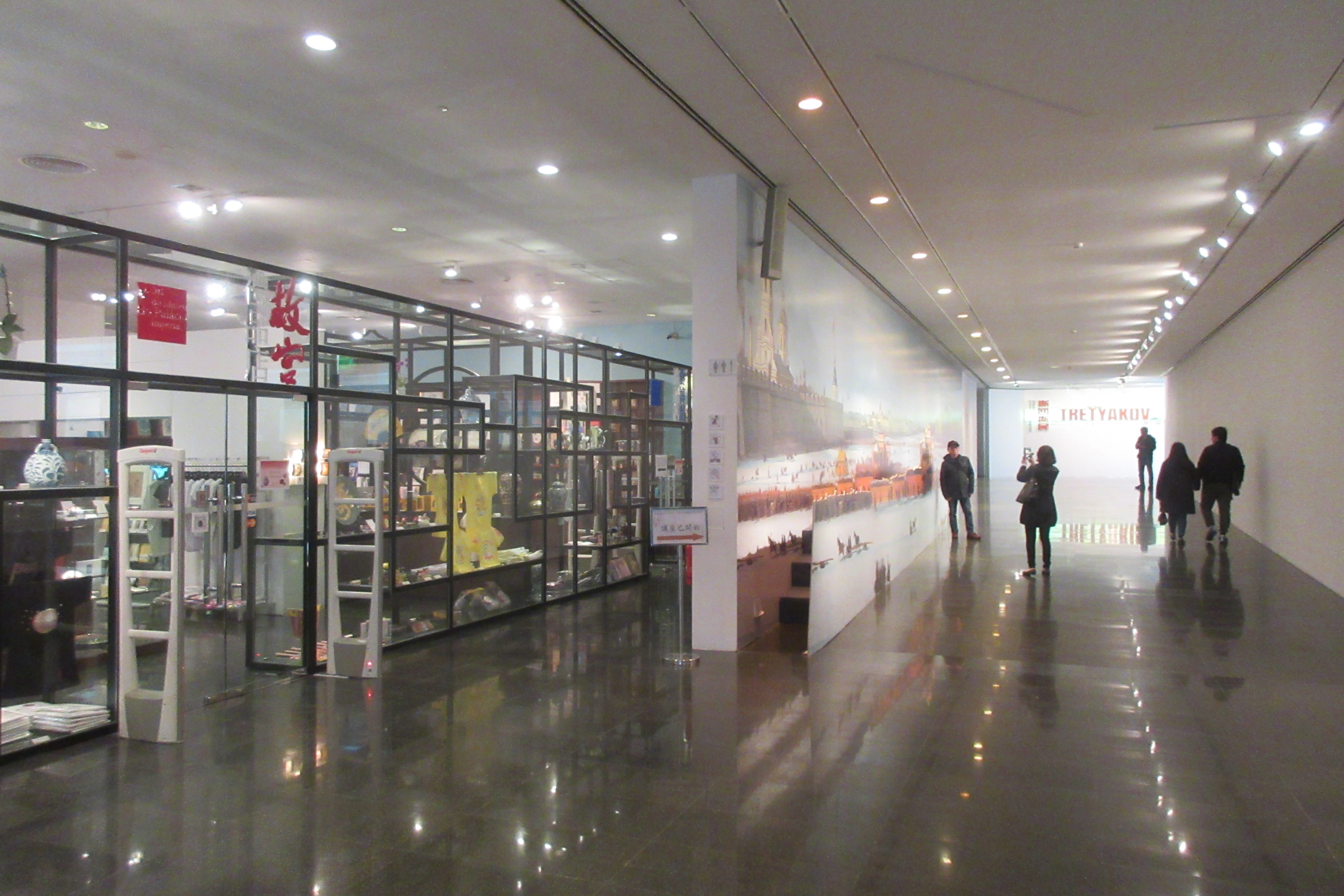
Gift shop

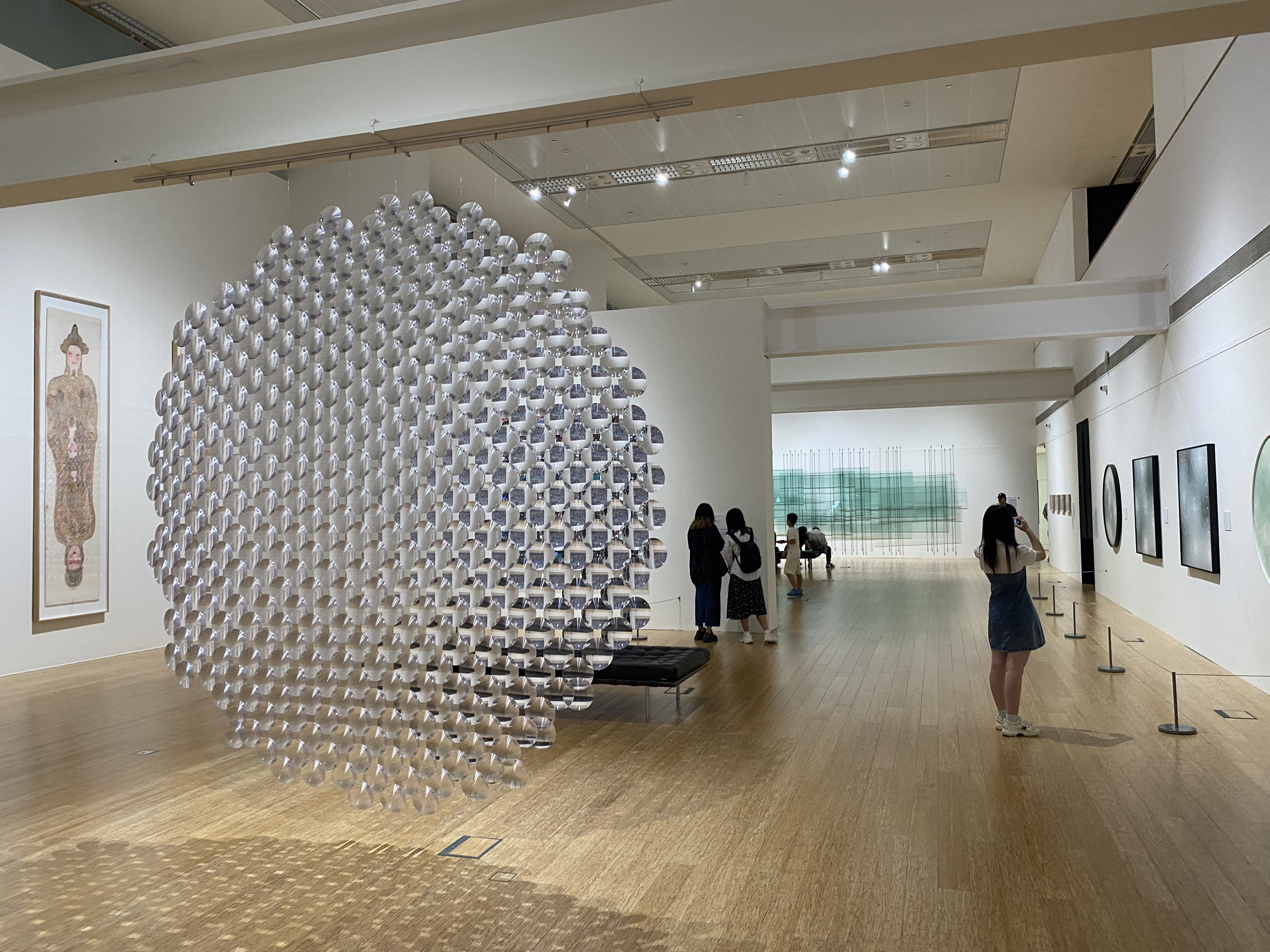
Second Floor

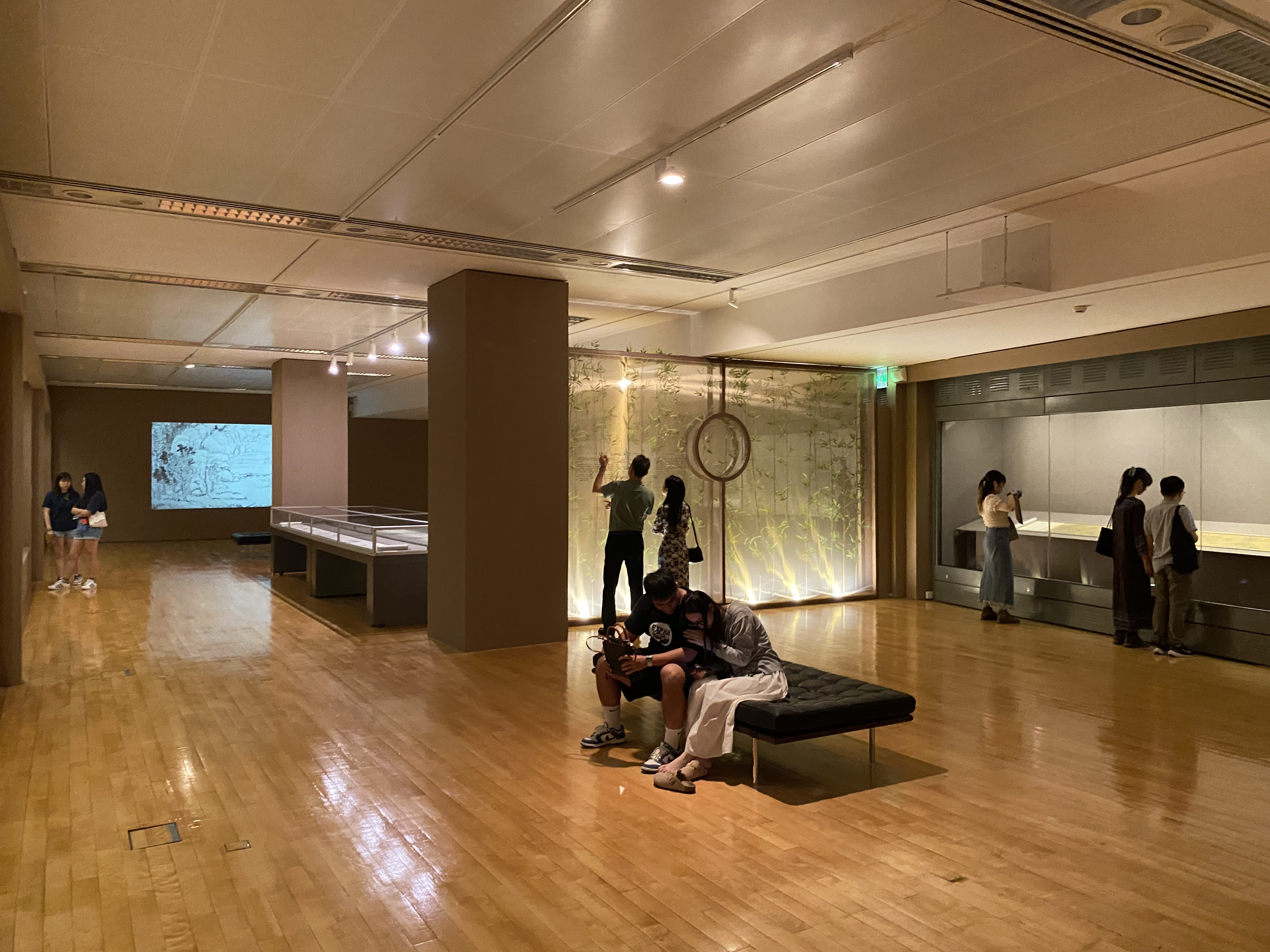
Exhibition Hall

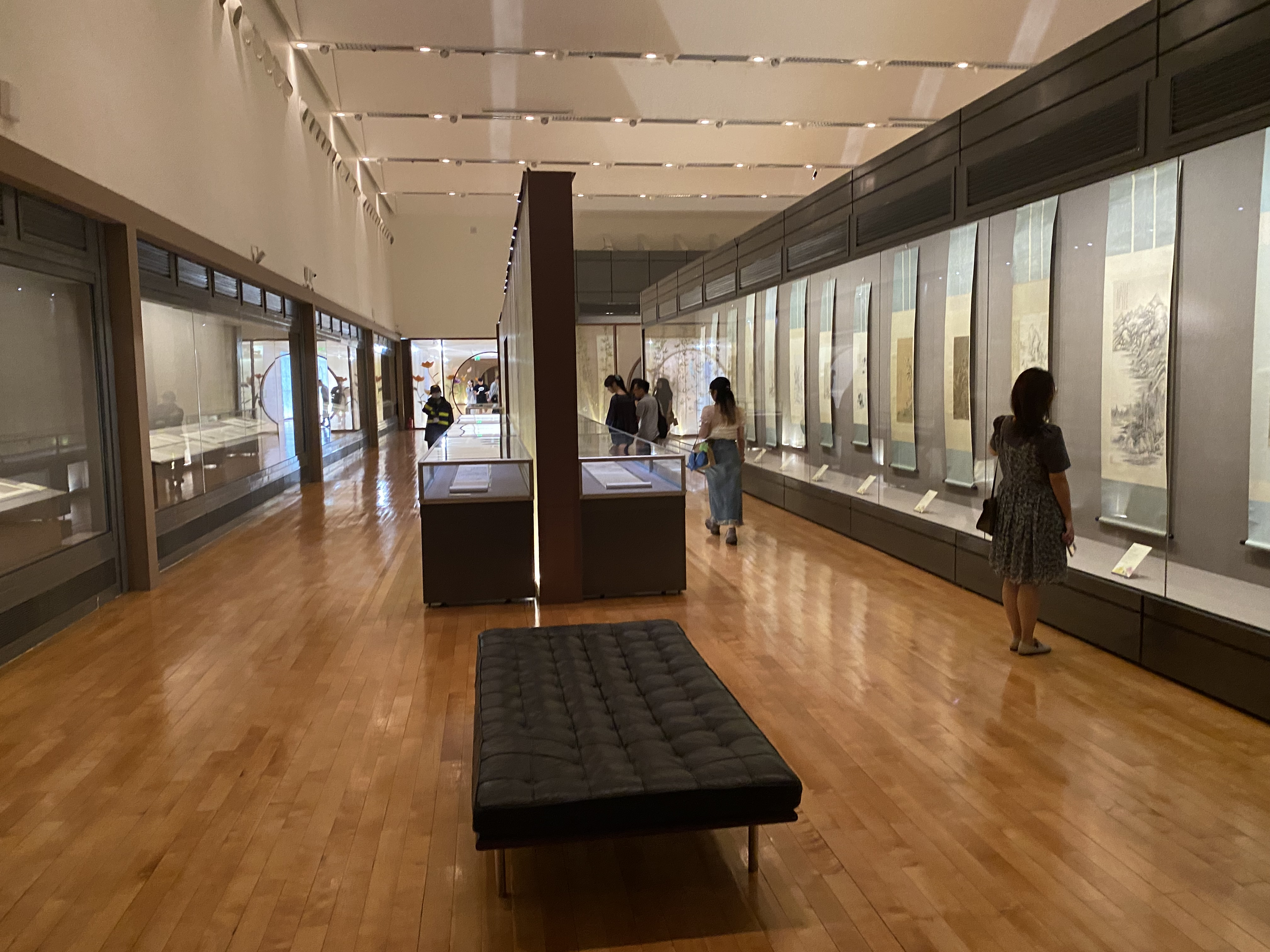
Fourth Floor

== See also ==
- List of museums in Macau
