= Grand Prix Museum =

Museum in Sé, Macau, China

Coordinates: 22.194906°N 113.552933°E

- 大賽車博物館; Museu do Grande Prémio
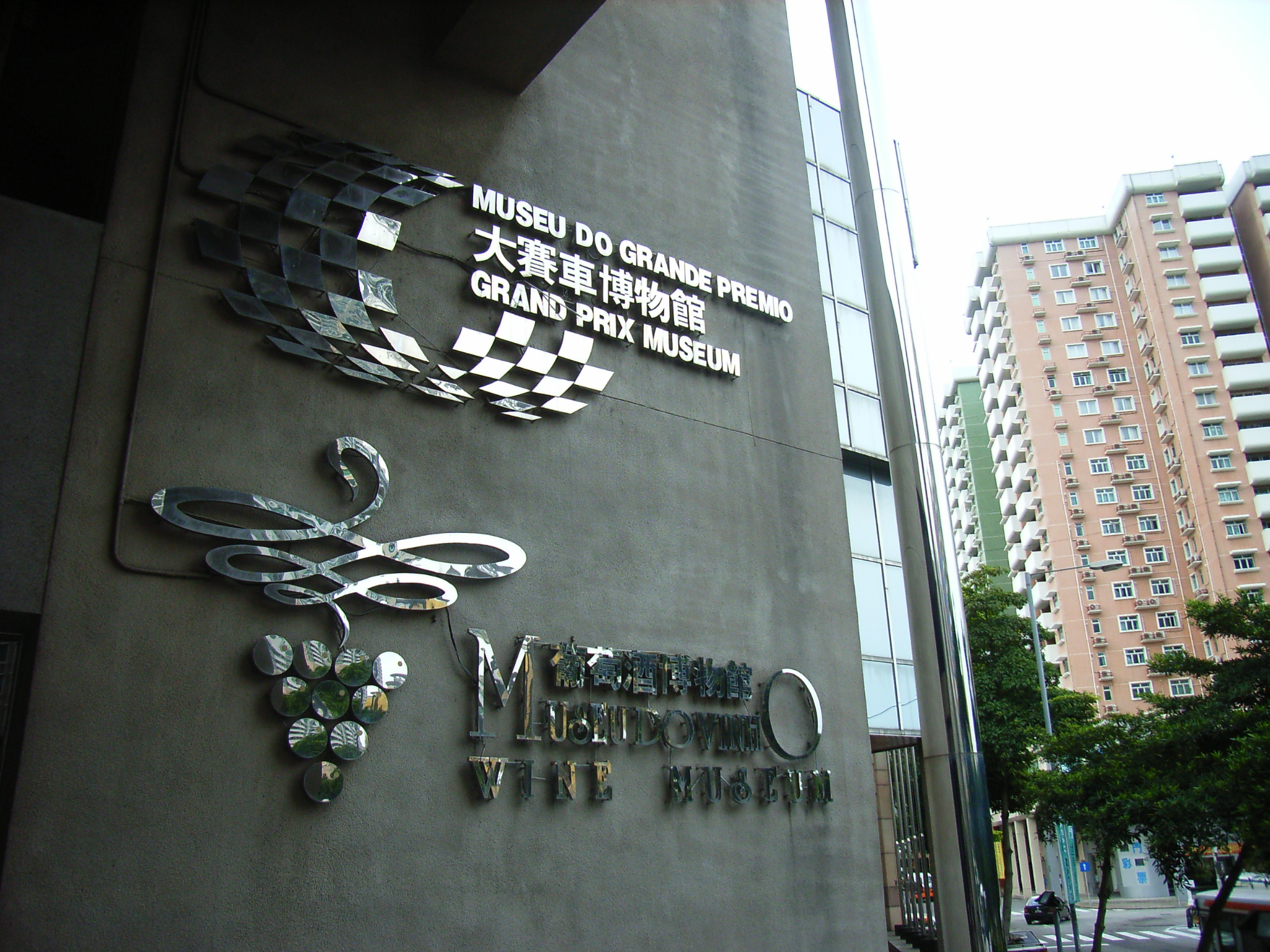
- Interactive map of the Grand Prix Museum area

General information
- Type: Museum
- Location: Sé, Macau, China
- Opening: 18 November 1993; 32 years ago

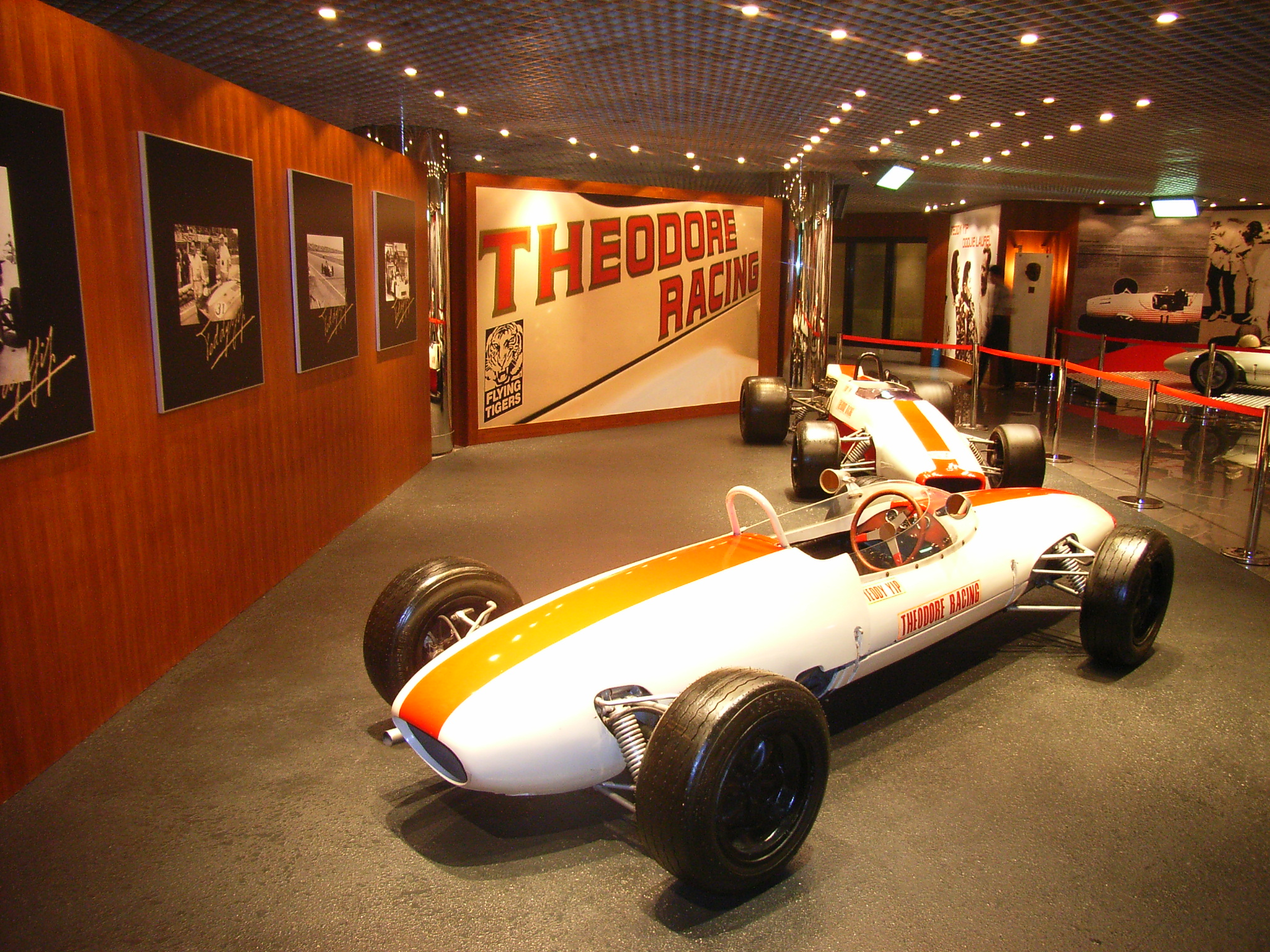
Interior view of the Grand Prix Museum prior to the 2017 renovations

The Grand Prix Museum (Chinese: 大賽車博物館; Portuguese: Museu do Grande Prémio) is a motor racing museum in Sé, Macau, China. The museum was inaugurated at the 40th Macau Grand Prix on 18 November 1993.

== History ==
The museum underwent renovation for the 50th celebration of the Macau Grand Prix.

The museum closed on 1 July 2017 for refurbishment. The refurbishment project was presented by the government in 2016 and had its public tender launched at the beginning of 2017. At the time, the government had an estimated budget of MOP380 million, dedicated to renovation and reorganization of the internal sewage network. The latest budget for the works had been increased to MOP830 million, the revised budget will also include the additional costs of purchasing all necessary equipment for the new museum to operate.

The museum re-opened on 1 June 2021.

== Collections ==
The museum covers a floorspace of 16,000m², and covers four floors, with each floor having a different focus. Visitors arrive at the museum and start their visit on the third floor, and work their way down. The third floor is dedicated to the Macau motorcycle Grand Prix, including a virtual reality experience. The second floor looks at the Macau Grand Prix and Formula 3 Macau Grand Prix. The ground floor looks at the Guia Circuit, and plays host to the gift shop. The basement hosts an exhibit on the Macau GT Cup. A virtual tour of the museum is available on their website.

== See also ==
- Macau Grand Prix
- Donington Grand Prix Exhibition, United Kingdom
- List of museums in Macau
