= Education and Youth Development Bureau =

Education agency of Macau

- Direcção dos Serviços de Educação e de Desenvolvimento da Juventude 教育及青年發展局
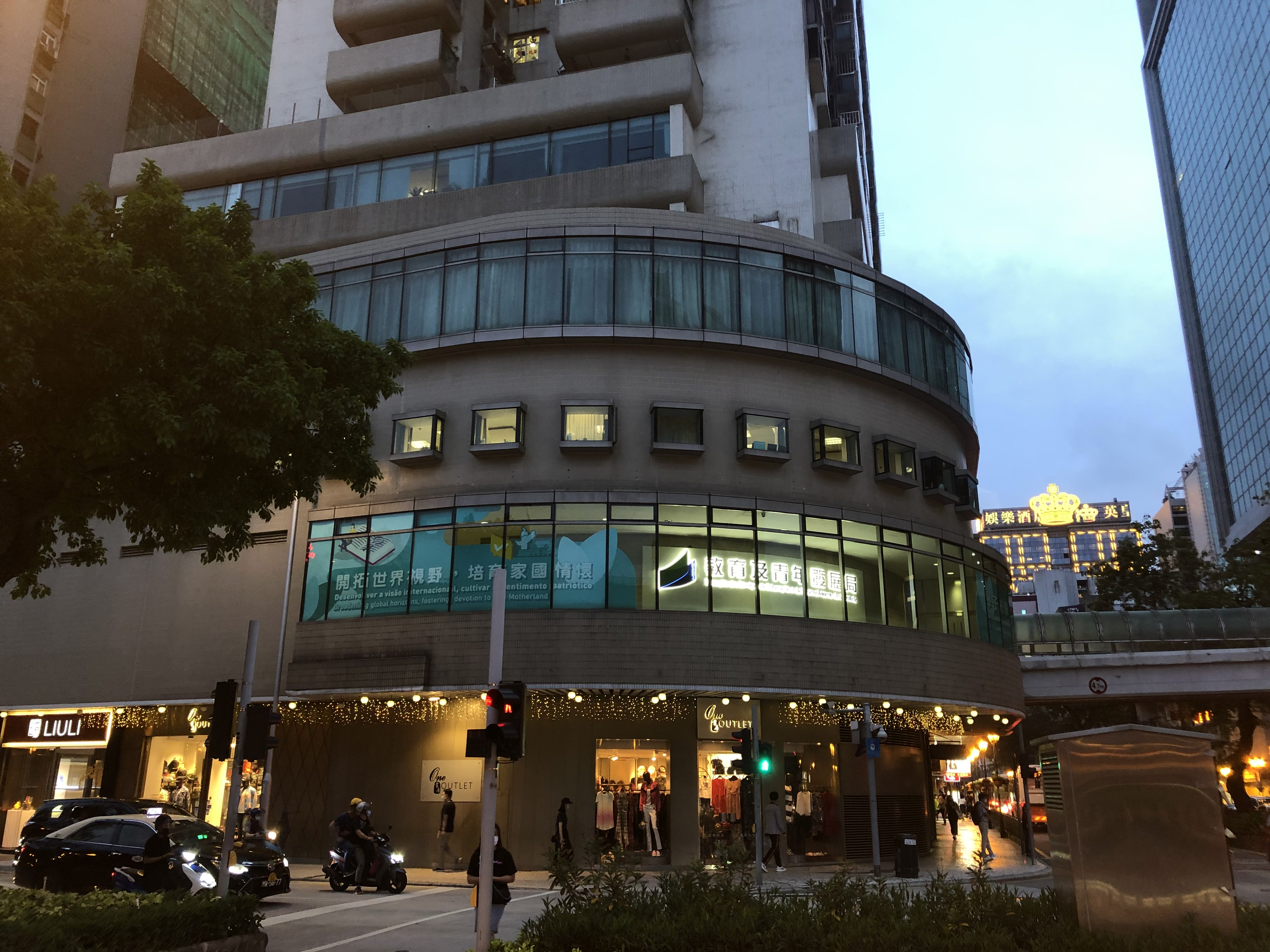
- Head office

Agency overview
- Formed: February 1, 2021
- Preceding agency: Education and Youth Affairs Bureau
- Jurisdiction: Government of Macau
- Headquarters: Avenida de D. João IV, n.os 7-9, 1.º andar, Macau

Education and Youth Development Bureau

Chinese name
- Traditional Chinese: 教育及青年發展局
- Simplified Chinese: 教育及青年发展局
Transcriptions
Standard Mandarin
- Hanyu Pinyin: Jiàoyù jí Qīngnián Fāzhǎn Jú
Yue: Cantonese
- Jyutping: gaau3 juk6 kap6 cing1 nin4 faat3 zin2 guk6

Portuguese name
- Portuguese: Direcção dos Serviços de Educação e de Desenvolvimento da Juventude

Education and Youth Development Bureau (Chinese: 教育及青年發展局; Portuguese: Direcção dos Serviços de Educação e de Desenvolvimento da Juventude, DSEDJ) is the education agency of Macau. Its head office is in Sé. It was created in 2021 to succeed the Education and Youth Affairs Bureau and the Higher Education Bureau, which merged.
