= Macau Government Headquarters =

Official office of the Chief Executive of Macau

Coordinates: 22.189931°N 113.538025°E

- 澳門特別行政區政府總部; Sede do Governo da Região Administrativa Especial de Macau da República Popular da China
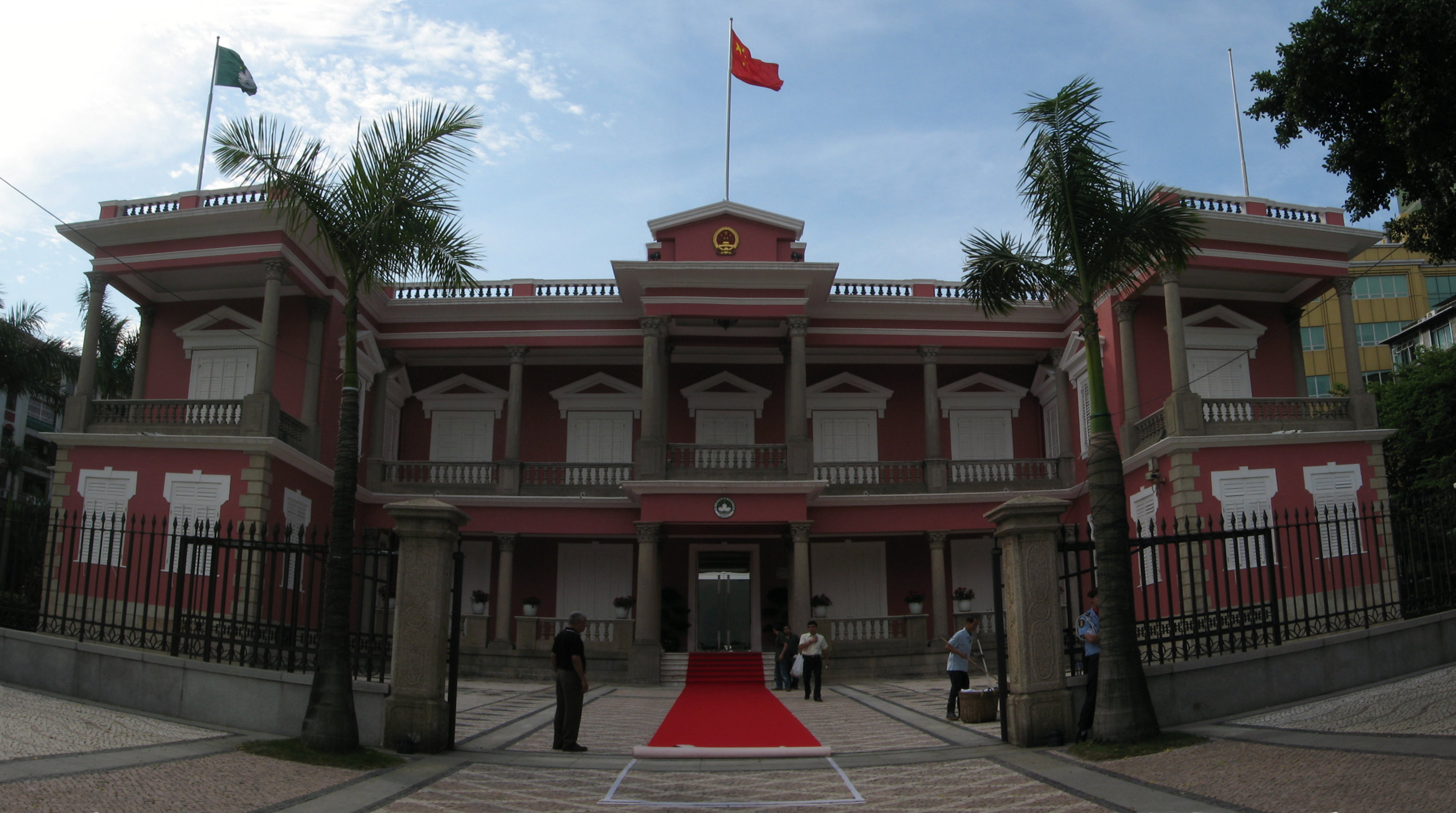
- Interactive map of the Macau Government Headquarters area

General information
- Location: São Lourenço, Macau, China
- Completed: 1849

Macau Government Headquarters

Chinese name
- Traditional Chinese: 澳門特別行政區政府總部
- Simplified Chinese: 澳门特别行政区政府总部
Transcriptions
Standard Mandarin
- Hanyu Pinyin: Àomén Tèbié Xíngzhèngqū Zhèngfǔ Zǒngbù
Yue: Cantonese
- Jyutping: Ou3mun2 Dak6bit6 Hang4zing3 Keoi1 zing3 fu2 zung2 bou6

Portuguese name
- Portuguese: Sede do Governo da Região Administrativa Especial de Macau da República Popular da China

The Macau Government Headquarters (Chinese: 澳門特別行政區政府總部; Portuguese: Sede do Governo da Região Administrativa Especial de Macau da República Popular da China), formerly Governor's Palace (Portuguese: Palácio do Governador) is the official office of the Chief Executive of Macau and has been since 1999. It is located in São Lourenço.

== History ==
Built in 1849 by Tomás de Aquino, architect, for Alexandrino Antonio de Melo, 1st Baron do Cercal, the two story pink facade structure is one of the historic properties preserving Portuguese influence in Macau and located on Avenida da Praia Grande, in the St. Lawrence Parish. The building used Pombaline style imported from Portugal and popular in the 18th to mid 19th Century. The office is the former residence of the Governor of Macau (relocated to another residence further west at Macau Government House) and the offices of the governor prior to the handover in 1999.

The building is surrounded by shops, residences and other office buildings. It is bounded by the roads Travessa Do Paiva, Avenida Dr Stanley Ho and Travessa do Padre Narciso. The northside is closed off by buildings.

The main entrance faces Avenida Dr Stanley Ho and looks out to Nam Van Lake with the Superior Court of Macau Building and Macau Legislative Assembly Building in the distance.

== Interior ==
The Government Headquarters has three wings and has undergone several reincarnations. Most of the interior is updated with modern features, but some original features have remained. The headquarters houses the Lotus Room (conference room of the Executive Council), a multi-purpose conference room and a pressroom. While the edifice and interior architecture is distinctly European, the building contains many Chinese wooden furniture and attractive ceramics.

== Exterior ==
A large garden with various plants, fountains and trees are found in the rear of the structure. The garden design is a mix of European and Chinese styles.

== Open Day ==
Two days a year it is open to visitors to discover the interior and exterior of the government office.
