= List of storms named Vongfong =

The name Vongfong (Cantonese: 黃蜂, [wɔːŋ˨˩ fʊŋ˥]) has been used for four tropical cyclones in the western North Pacific Ocean. The name was contributed by Macau and means wasp in Cantonese.

- Tropical Storm Vongfong (2002) (T0214, 20W) – passed close to Hainan Island
- Severe Tropical Storm Vongfong (2008) (T0811, 12W) – moved parallel to Japan
- Typhoon Vongfong (2014) (T1419, 19W, Ompong) – a Category 5 super typhoon that struck Japan; strongest cyclone worldwide in 2014
- Typhoon Vongfong (2020) (T2001, 01W, Ambo) – an early-season Category 3 typhoon that hit the Philippines, causing over ₱1 billion damage

The name Vongfong was retired after the 2020 Pacific typhoon season and was replaced with Penha (Portuguese: penha, [ˈpɐ.ɲɐ]), which refers to Penha Hill and Our Lady of Penha Chapel.

- Tropical Storm Penha (2026) (T2602, 02W, Basyang) - a weak but costly tropical cyclone that made landfall in Visayas and Mindanao, and majorly Surigao del Sur

Preceded by Nokaen	Pacific typhoon season names Penha	Succeeded by Nuri
