= Macau Government House =

Building in São Lourenço, Macau

Coordinates: 22.185330°N 113.534337°E

Macau Government House Palacete de Santa Sancha
- 竹仔室總督官邸
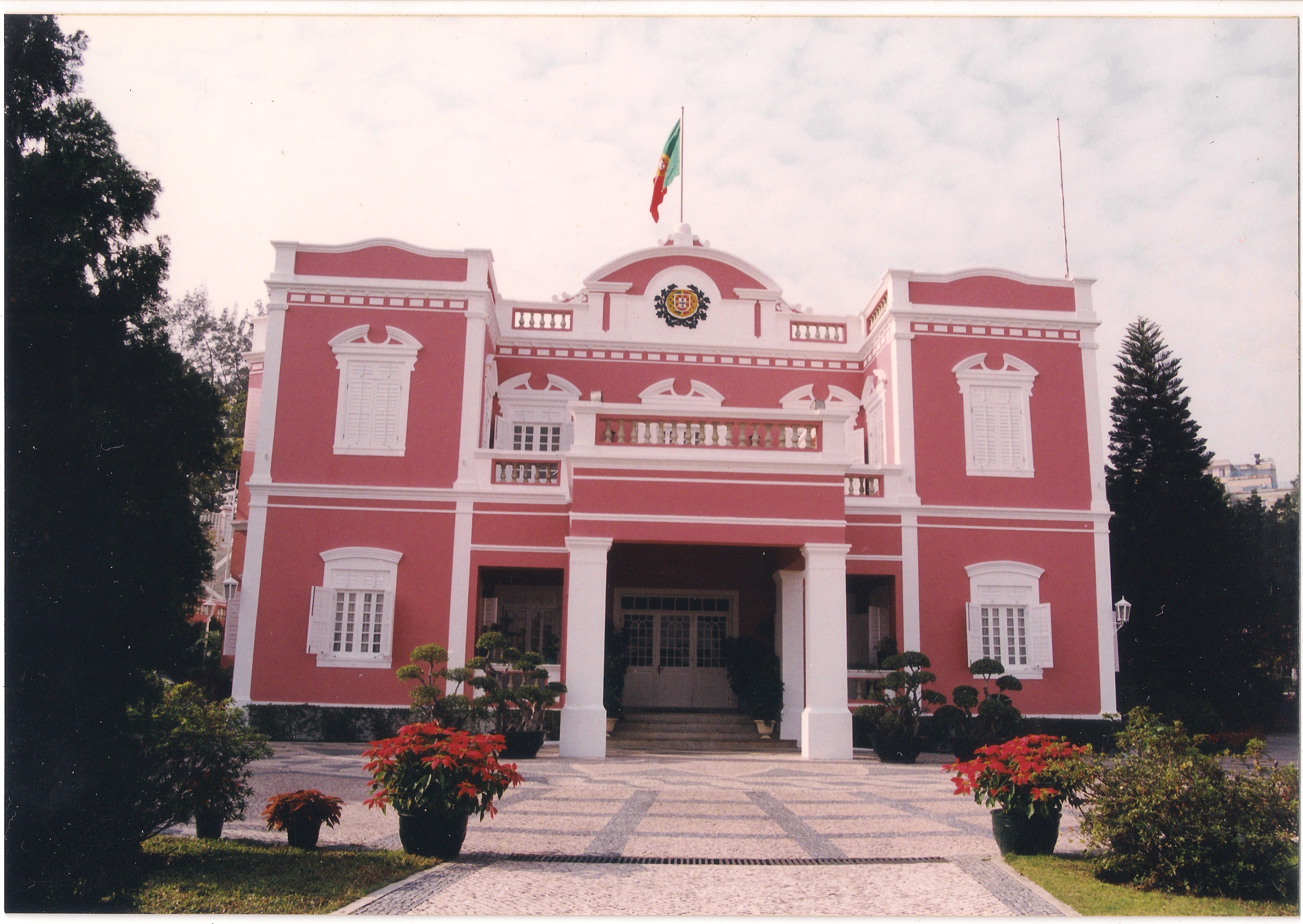
- Interactive map of the Macau Government House; Palacete de Santa Sancha area

General information
- Location: São Lourenço, Macau.
- Completed: 1846

Macau Government House

Chinese name
- Traditional Chinese: 竹仔室總督官邸
- Simplified Chinese: 竹仔室总督官邸
Transcriptions
Standard Mandarin
- Hanyu Pinyin: Zhúzǐshì Zǒngdū Guāndǐ
Yue: Cantonese
- Jyutping: zuk1 zai2 sat1 zung2 duk1 gun1 dai2

Portuguese name
- Portuguese: Palacete de Santa Sancha

Macau Government House (Chinese: 竹仔室總督官邸; Portuguese: Palacete de Santa Sancha) or Santa Sancha is a building in São Lourenço, Macau. It is the state guest house of the Chief Executive of Macau. It is one of a few historic properties preserving Portuguese influence in Macau. Like many historic buildings it is clad in a pink like colour.

== History ==
Prior to December 1999, the home was the official residence of the governor of Macau since 1937. Its first resident during Portuguese rule was Artur Tamagnini de Sousa Barbosa (巴波沙).

Built in 1846 as a private home by Macanese architect Thomaz de Aquino, it was acquired by the Macau Government in 1926 and finally became the official residence replacing the Macau Government Headquarters, which then served as the Governor's office until 1999. Government House is now a state guest house. The building is an example of Pombaline style popular in Macau and Portugal in the 18th and 19th Century.

== Location ==
The home is built on a plateau (and foothills of Barra Hill) overlooking Sai Van Lake and bounded by private homes on several roads (Estrada de Santa Sancha, Estrada da Penha, Calçada da Praia and Avenida da República).

The home's address is 6 Estrada de Santa Sancha. It is guarded by Macau's Security Forces at the main gate on Estrada de Santa Sancha.

Like the Macau Government Headquarters, the home is surrounded by a larger garden. A covered walkway offers a view of Sai Van Lake and the tennis courts below belonging to Clube Militar and the Macau Foundation. The home is located in a residential part of St. Lawrence Parish and neighbours are the affluent members of Macau.
