= Maritime Museum (Macau) =

Museum in São Lourenço, Macau, China

- 海事博物館; Museu Marítimo

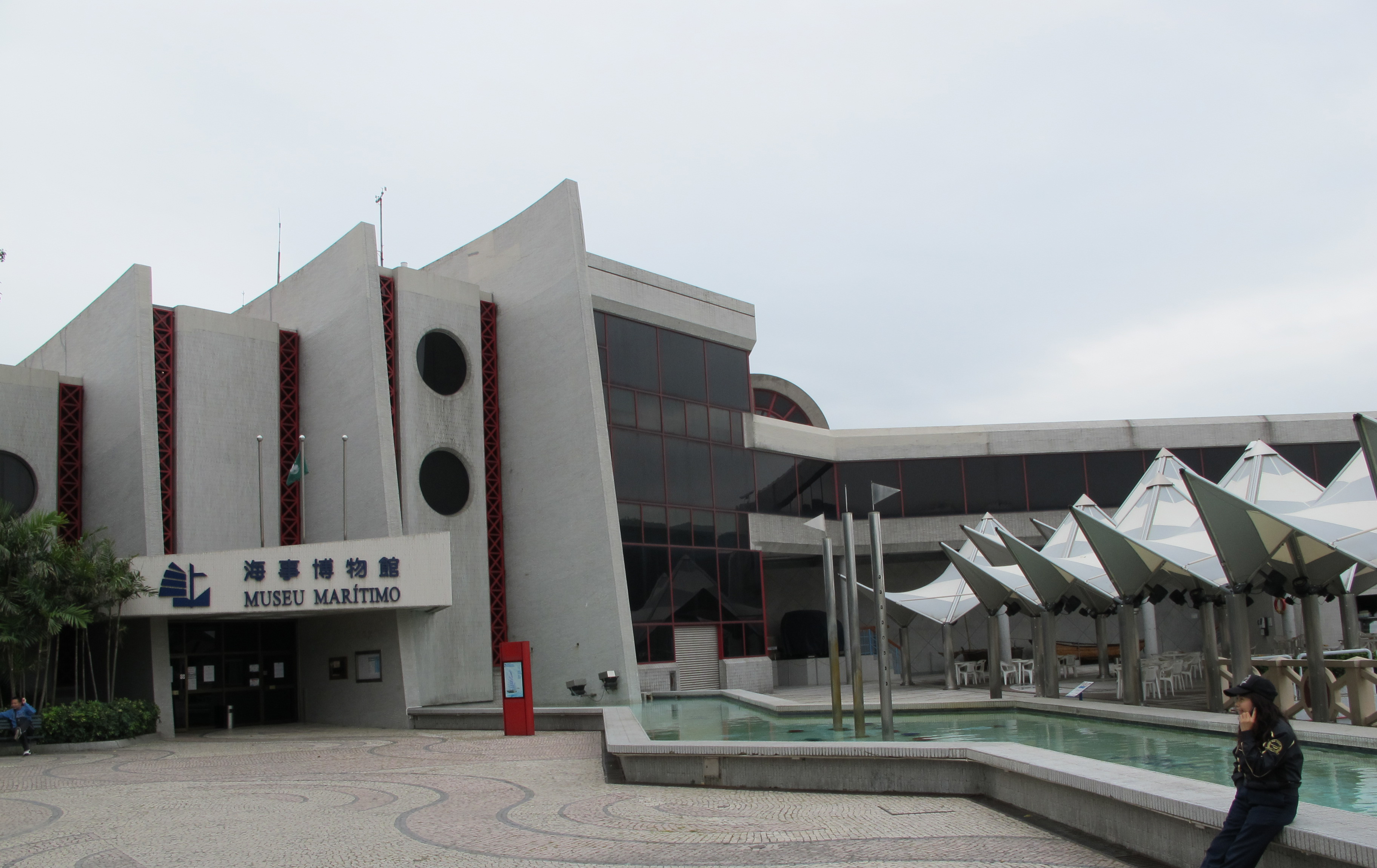
- Established: 1987 (original building); 24 June 1990 (current building)
- Location: São Lourenço, Macau, China
- Coordinates: 22°11′09.4″N 113°31′50.1″E
- Type: museum
- Website: Official website

Maritime Museum

Chinese name
- Traditional Chinese: 海事博物館
- Simplified Chinese: 海事博物馆
Transcriptions
Standard Mandarin
- Hanyu Pinyin: Hǎishì Bówùguǎn
Yue: Cantonese
- Jyutping: hoi2 si6 bok3 mat6 gun2

Portuguese name
- Portuguese: Museu Marítimo

The Maritime Museum (Chinese: 海事博物館; Portuguese: Museu Marítimo) is a museum in São Lourenço, Macau, China.

== History ==
The construction of the museum was proposed in 1986. The museum was finally opened in 1987. Because of space constraint, new museum building was constructed and opened on 24 June 1990 while the former building was transformed into the administrative building of the museum.

== Architecture ==
The museum building spans over 800 m^{2} of area and was built on the site where the first Portuguese explorers landed on Macau in 1553. The building resembles the shape of a ship.

== Exhibitions ==
- Maritime Ethnology Exhibition
- Maritime History Exhibition
- Maritime Technology Exhibition
- Aquarium Gallery

== See also ==
- List of museums in Macau
