= Superior Court of Macau Building =

Court building in Macau

Coordinates: 22°10′58″N 113°32′27″E

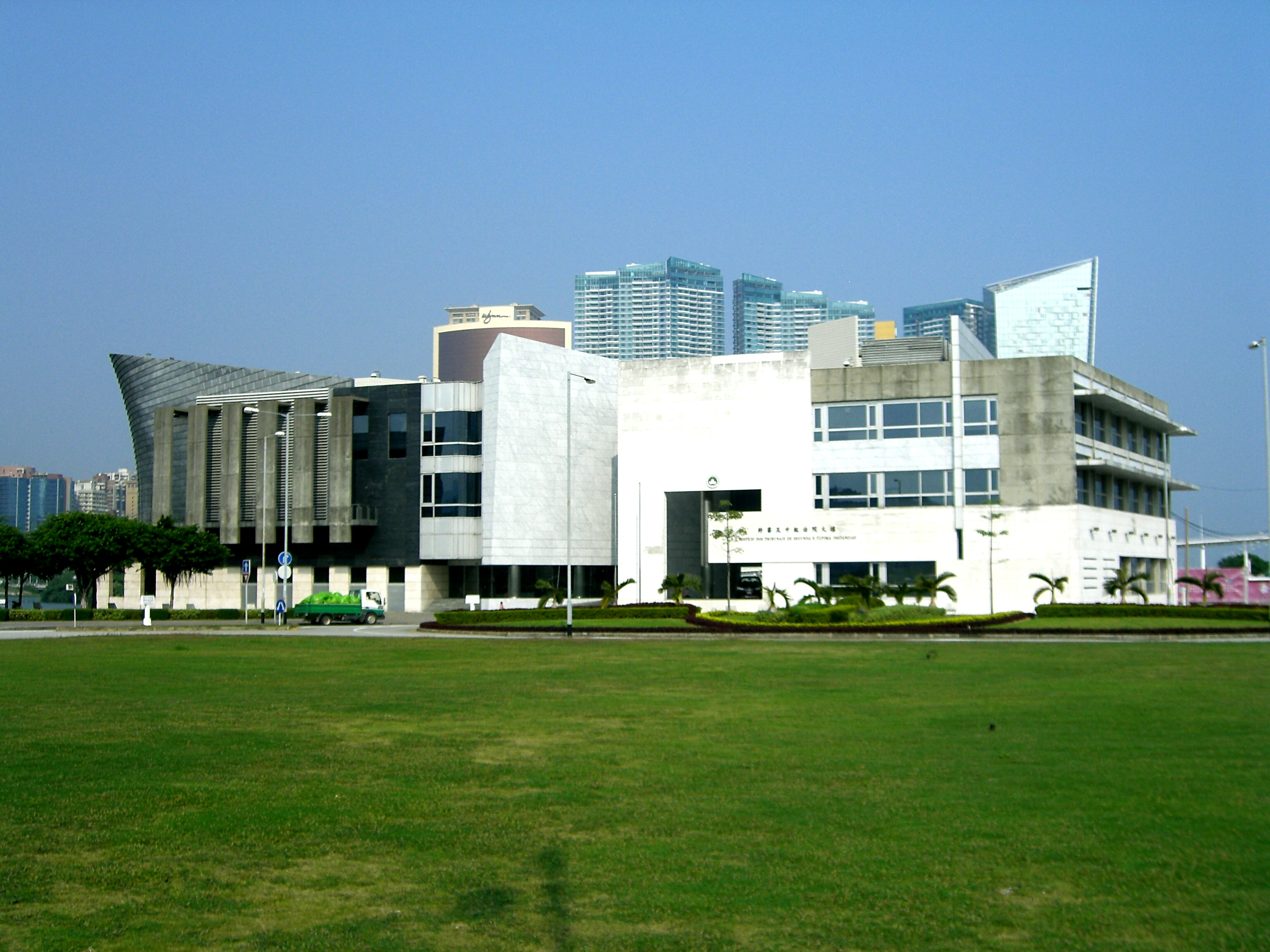
- The Court of Final Appeal building

Chinese name
- Traditional Chinese: 終審及中級法院大樓
- Simplified Chinese: 终审及中级法院大楼
Transcriptions
Standard Mandarin
- Hanyu Pinyin: Zhōngshěn jí Zhōngjí Fǎyuàn Dàlóu
Yue: Cantonese
- Jyutping: zung1 sam2 kap6 zung1 kap1 faat3 jyun6*2 daai6 lau4

Portuguese name
- Portuguese: Edifício dos Tribunais de Segunda e Última Instâncias

Superior Court of Macau Building (Chinese: 終審及中級法院大樓, Portuguese: Edifício dos Tribunais de Segunda e Última Instâncias) is the home of the supreme court of Macau and the second court of appeal.

Construction of the court house began in 1997 and was completed in 1999 in time for the handover. The court building is located next to the Macau Legislative Assembly Building in Nam Van Lake area and located within Cathedral Parish.

The three storey structure uses various types of stones on a concrete core:

- bushamered Portuguese limestone
- polished gray lined marble – arabescato
- Portuguese black cleft slate
- Norwegian Cleft Alta Quartzite

Steel, glass, copper and wood are other materials used throughout the building.

The building was built by local architectural firm Mario Duarte Duque.

== See also ==
- across the lake on the west side is Macau Government Headquarters, former residence of the Governor of Macau and more recently the offices of the Governor (until 1999).
- Court Building, Macau
