= Tropical Storm Vongfong (2002) =

Pacific tropical storm in 2002

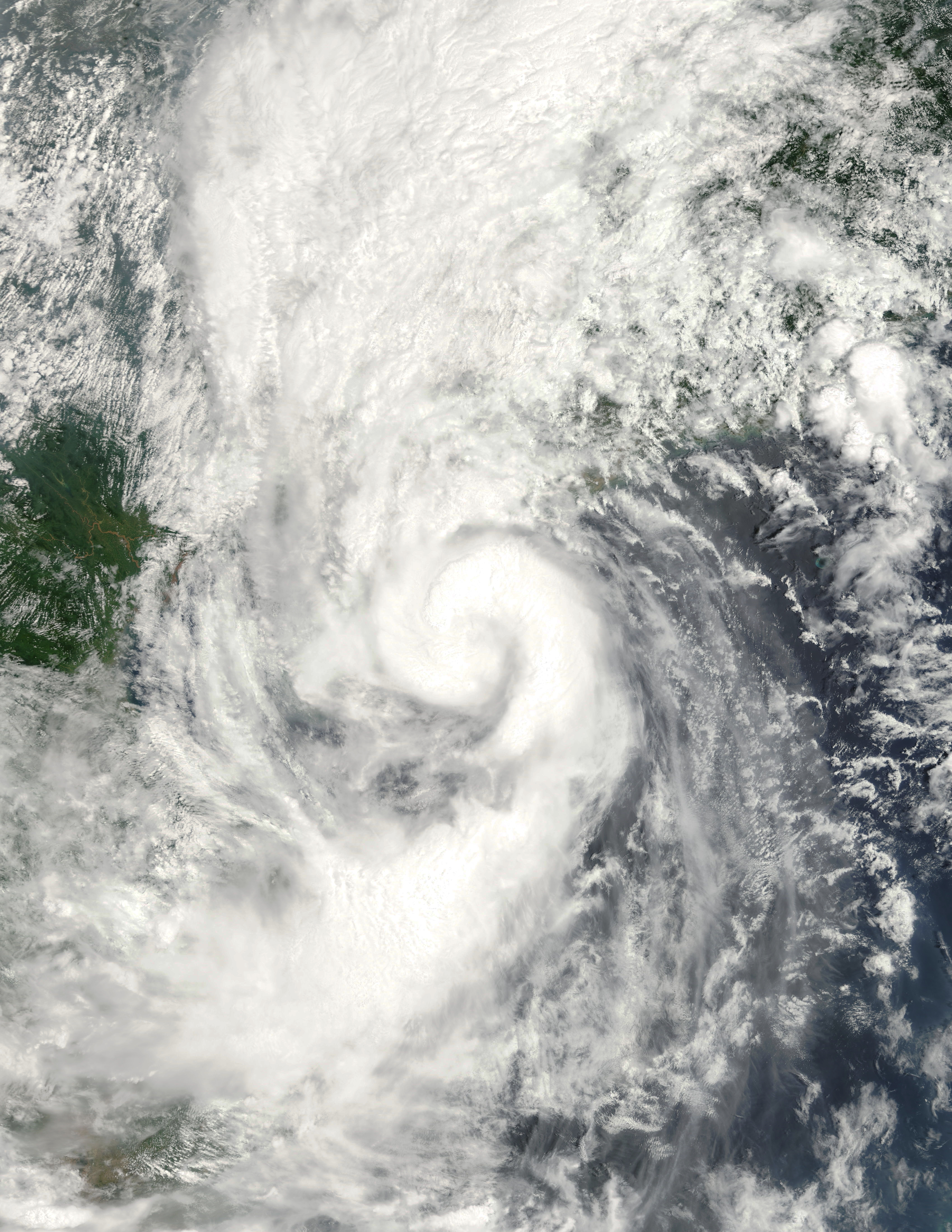
- Tropical Storm Vongfong at peak intensity on August 19

Meteorological history
- Formed: August 15, 2002
- Dissipated: August 20, 2002

Tropical storm
- 10-minute sustained (JMA)
- Highest winds: 75 km/h (45 mph)
- Lowest pressure: 985 hPa (mbar); 29.09 inHg

Tropical storm
- 1-minute sustained (SSHWS/JTWC)
- Highest winds: 100 km/h (65 mph)
- Lowest pressure: 984 hPa (mbar); 29.06 inHg

Overall effects
- Fatalities: 44 total
- Damage: $86 million (2002 USD)
- Areas affected: Philippines, China
- IBTrACS
- Part of the 2002 Pacific typhoon season

Tropical Storm Vongfong (Note: The name Vongfong (Cantonese: 黃蜂, [wɔːŋ˨˩ fʊŋ˥]) was contributed by Macau and means wasp in Cantonese.) affected China after a deadly flood season in mid August 2002. The 14th named storm of the 2002 Pacific typhoon season, Vongfong developed as a tropical depression on August 10. Initially it was disorganized due to hostile conditions, and it failed to intensify significantly before crossing the Philippine island of Luzon. There, flooding forced 3,500 people to evacuate their homes. In the Philippines, the storm killed 35 people and caused $3.3 million in damage. (Note: All damage totals are in 2002 United States dollars unless otherwise noted.)

After affecting the Philippines, the tropical depression dissipated in the South China Sea, although it reformed on August 15. It moved northwestward, strengthening into Tropical Storm Vongfong. It brushed eastern Hainan before making landfall on August 19 in southern China near Wuchuan, Guangdong. Soon after it dissipated, the storm dropped heavy rainfall across the region, causing one traffic accident in Hong Kong and killing twelve people due to landslides. The storm destroyed 6,000 houses, mostly in Guangdong, and damage in the country totaled at least $86 million.

== Meteorological history ==
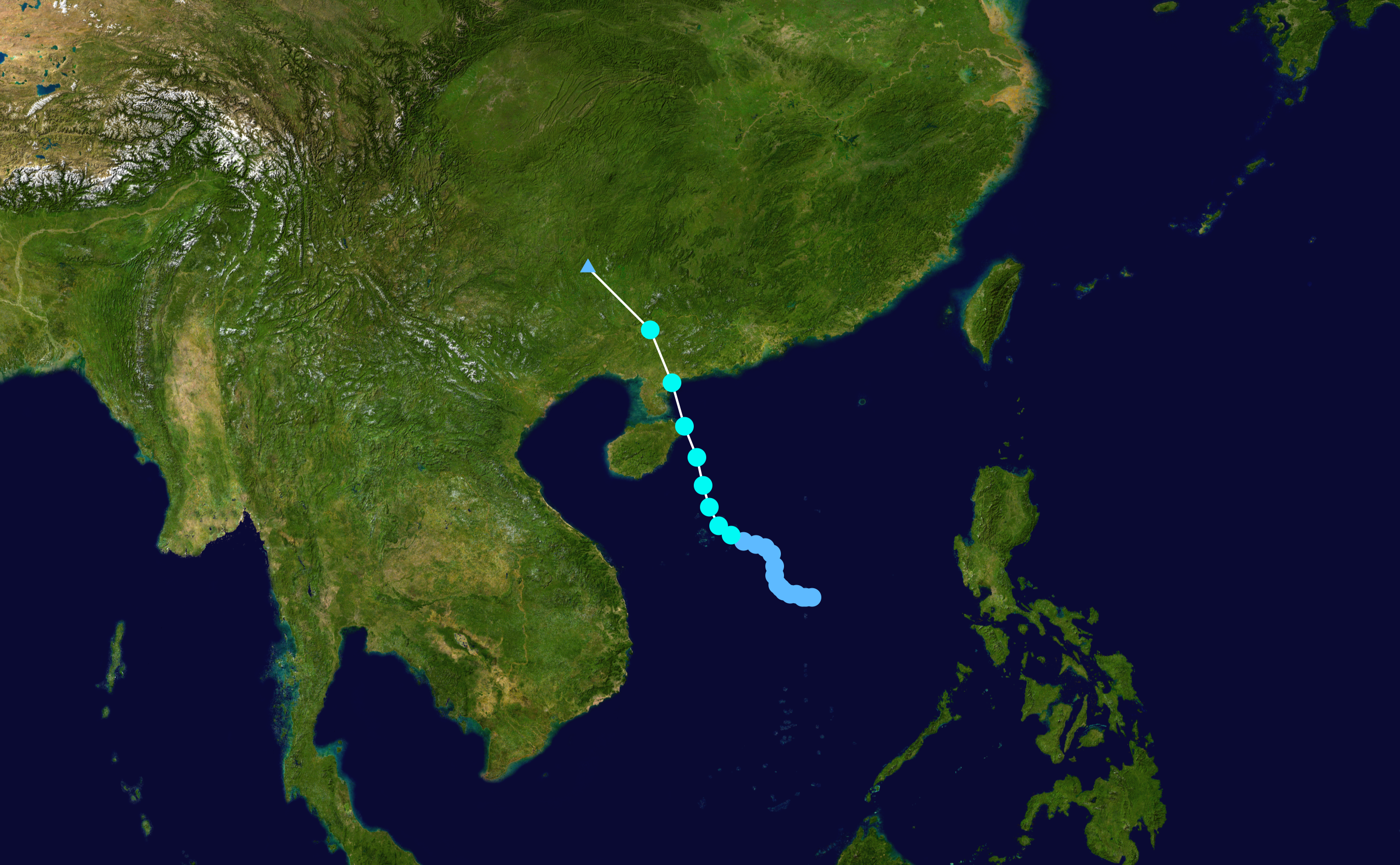
JTWC track of Tropical Storm Vongfong after redevelopment

On August 8, an area of convection, or thunderstorms, formed to the west-northwest of Palau, with a weak circulation connected to the monsoon trough. The system had good outflow, although it was initially within an area of increasing moderate wind shear, which limited organization. Convection increased, and although the circulation was exposed, the shear later decreased enough for the system to organize into a tropical depression on August 10; the Joint Typhoon Warning Center (JTWC) (Note: The Joint Typhoon Warning Center is a joint United States Navy – United States Air Force task force that issues tropical cyclone warnings for the western Pacific Ocean and other regions.) labeled it as Tropical Depression 18W, (Note: The Joint Typhoon Warning Center considered the storm as two separate cyclones, although the Japan Meteorological Agency and other warning centers classified them as a continuous cyclone that regenerated.) the Japan Meteorological Agency (JMA) (Note: The Japan Meteorological Agency is the official Regional Specialized Meteorological Center for the western Pacific Ocean.) labeled it as an unnumbered depression, and the Philippine Atmospheric, Geophysical and Astronomical Services Administration (PAGASA) gave it the name Tropical Depression Milenyo.

Upon developing, the depression was located in an area of weak steering currents, still connected to the monsoon rough, and it moved slowly to the west-northwest. The thunderstorms continued to be sheared to the west of the circulation, which limited strengthening. On August 12, the JTWC briefly upgraded the system to a tropical storm after a temporary increase in thunderstorms, although the system soon weakened. A ridge to the north caused a general westward track toward the Philippines. With a fully exposed circulation, the depression made landfall at 0800 UTC on August 13 near Infanta on the Philippine island of Luzon. It soon dissipated due to continued shear and land interaction. The remnants continued westward into the South China Sea, and PAGASA and JMA both discontinued advisories early on August 14. However, on August 15, a tropical depression re-developed halfway between Vietnam and the Philippines, with a circulation exposed from the convection due to moderate wind shear. That day, the JTWC initiated advisories on Tropical Depression 20W.

After redevelopment, wind shear continued to be a problem, with convection located southwest of the center. Early on August 17, a pulse in the monsoon increased thunderstorms and allowed the system to become better organized. The convection became more concentrated and the circulation less exposed. As a result, the JMA upgraded the depression to Tropical Storm Vongfong early on August 18, still in the central South China Sea. Around that time, the storm began moving more quickly to the northwest due to a developing ridge to its northeast. Although the JMA estimated peak 10–minute sustained winds of only 75 km/h (45 mph), the JTWC assessed Vongfong as continuing to intensify to peak 1–minute winds of 100 km/h (65 mph), early on August 19. By that time, the storm was near Hainan, and at 1240 UTC that day, Vongfong made landfall in southern China near Wuchuan, Guangdong. It quickly weakened over land, dissipating early on August 20 to the west of Guilin.

== Preparations and impact ==
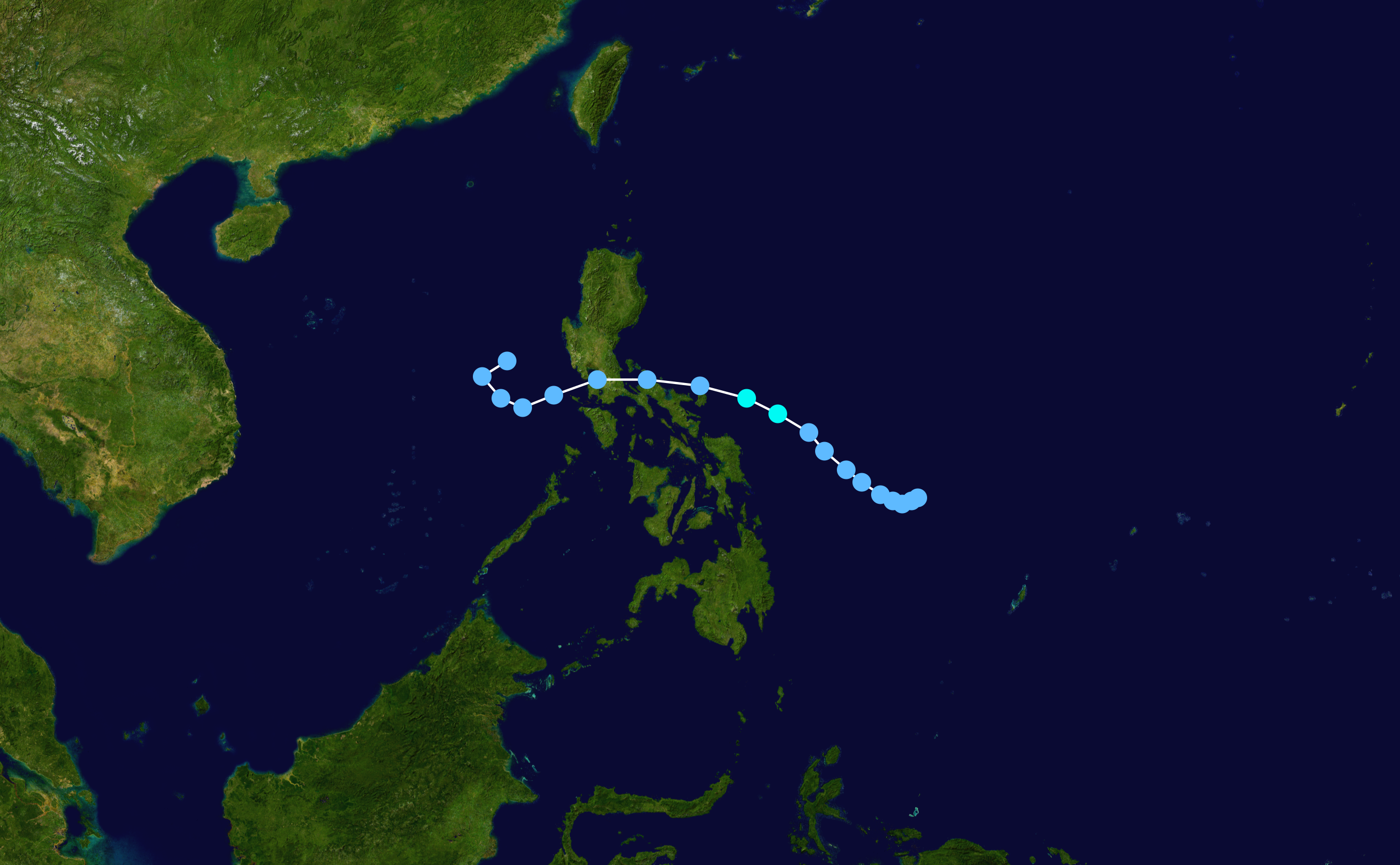
JTWC track map of Tropical Storm 18W, which interpret as the precursor of Vongfong

Heavy rains from the storm affected the Philippines, causing flooding that forced 3,500 people to evacuate their houses. This occurred after a month of heavy rainfall from several tropical cyclones in July. Officials closed schools and advised small boats to remain at port. A vessel capsized offshore Antique Province, and its crew of 15 was rescued. At least six people died due to electrocution, after downed power lines touched floodwaters. The storm spawned a tornado and caused landslides in Negros Oriental. The storm killed 35 people in the country and injured 22 others. Damage was estimated at $3.3 million (₱172 million 2002 PHP). (Note: The total was originally reported in Philippine pesos. Total converted via the Oanda Corporation website.) Milenyo was the final storm to be named by PAGASA during 2002.

On August 17, the Hong Kong Observatory (HKO) issued standby signal number 1 due to the storm's reformation in the South China Sea. Vongfong made landfall west of the territory, although its outer rainbands spread across the region. Slick roads contributed to a traffic accident in Sai Kung in which one person was killed. Rainfall in Hong Kong reached 133 mm (5.2 in) in the town of Kwai Chung. The rainbands also produced gusty winds; sustained winds peaked at 75 km/h (47 mph), with gusts to 110 km/h (68 mph) at the mountain peak of Tai Mo Shan. While moving ashore, Vongfong produced a storm surge of 0.48 m (1.6 ft) in Shek Pik. The storm downed a few trees across the territory, and a fallen branch injured one man. Another person was injured by a damaged awning.

In Hainan, the threat from Vongfong prompted officials to close the primary airport and to restrict sea traffic with Guangdong. As a result, 113 flights were delayed, stranding more than 3,000 people. On the island, rainfall reached as high as 240 mm (9.4 in) in Haikou over a three-day period. In the city, the storm downed 2,145 trees, and damage was estimated at $456,000 (¥3.8 million CNY. (Note: All damage totals in China were originally reported in 2002 Chinese renminbi. Totals converted via the Oanda Corporation website.) In the midst of a deadly flooding season across China, including Tropical Storm Kammuri that affected the region only 12 days earlier, Vongfong brought additionally heavy rainfall to southwestern China; totals in Guangdong peaked at 222.6 mm (8.76 in) in Zhanjiang, and in Guangxi, rainfall reached 124 mm (4.9 in) in a nine-hour period in Bobai County. The storm washed a boat ashore about 60 km (37 mi) southwest of Hong Kong, although the passengers were rescued. Rains spread as far north as Hunan, where previous flooding prompted a state of emergency. In neighboring Jiangxi, floods caused the Yangtze River to crest above warning levels in Jiujiang. River levels also rose in Liuzhou in Guangxi. Wind gusts as strong as 144 km/h (90 mph) were reported in Zhanjiang, and a station in Guangxi reported gusts to 115 km/h (71 mph). The storm caused flooding and landslides that damaged thousands of houses. Some areas lost electricity during the storm, and the storm disrupted traffic in the region. Vongfong flooded 46,000 ha (110,000 acres) of crop fields, and storm flooding also damaged hundreds of reservoirs. Vongfong destroyed 5,600 houses in Guangdong, many of them in Zhanjiang, and provincial damage there was estimated at $46 million (¥382 million CNY). In Guangxi, the storm killed twelve people, eight due to landslides. At least 400 houses were destroyed in Guangxi, and damage in the province was estimated at over $36.2 million (¥300 million CNY).

== See also ==
- Other tropical cyclones named Vongfong
