= São Lourenço, Macau =

Coordinates: 22.1885°N 113.5349°E

São Lourenço 風順堂區 Saint Lawrence
- Freguesia
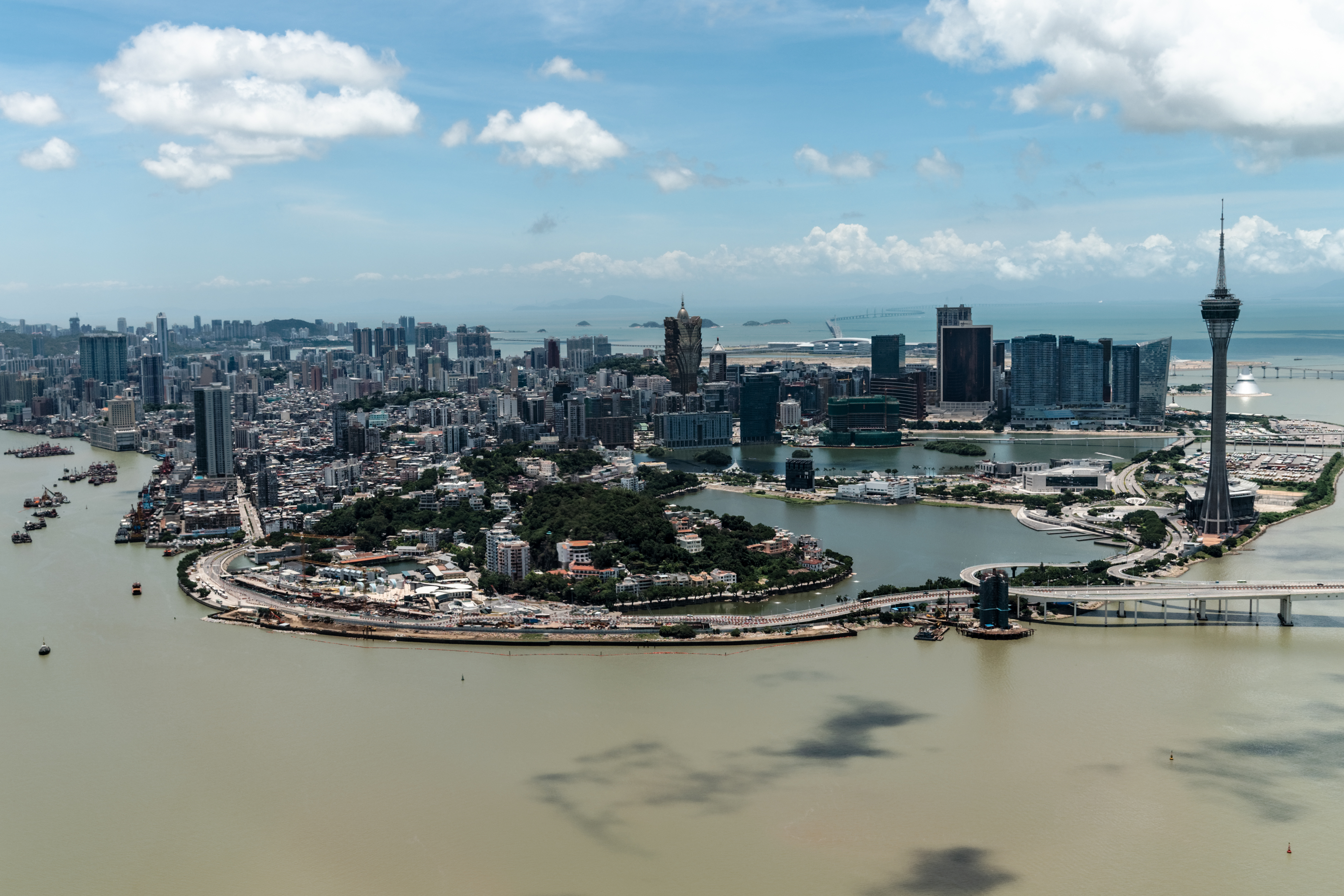

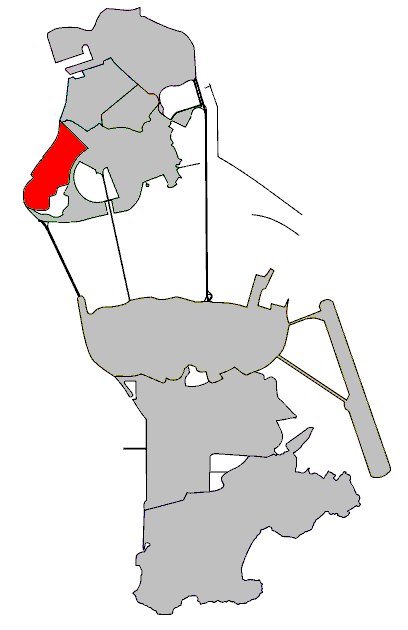
- Freguesia de São Lourenço in Macau
- Country: Macau
- Region: Municipality of Macau

Area
  - Total: 1.0 km^{2} (0.39 sq mi)

Population (2013)
  - Total: 51,700
  - Density: 52,000/km^{2} (130,000/sq mi)
- Time zone: UTC+8 (Macau Standard)

São Lourenço, Macau

Chinese name
- Traditional Chinese: 風順堂區
- Simplified Chinese: 风顺堂区
- Jyutping: fung^{1} seon^{6} tong^{4} keoi^{1}
- Hanyu Pinyin: Fēngshùn Tángqū
Transcriptions
Standard Mandarin
- Hanyu Pinyin: Fēngshùn Tángqū
- Yale Romanization: Fēngshwùn Tángchyū
- IPA: [fə́ŋʂwə̌n tʰǎŋtɕʰý]
Yue: Cantonese
- Yale Romanization: Fúngseuhn Tòhngkeu
- Jyutping: fung^{1} seon^{6} tong^{4} keoi^{1}
- IPA: [fʊ́ŋsɵ̀n tʰɔ̏ːŋkʰœ́ː]

Alternative name
- Traditional Chinese: 聖老愣佐堂區
- Simplified Chinese: 圣老愣佐堂区
- Jyutping: sing^{3} lou^{5} ling^{4} zo^{6} tong^{4} keoi^{1}
- Hanyu Pinyin: Shènglǎoléngzuǒ Tángqū
Transcriptions
Standard Mandarin
- Hanyu Pinyin: Shènglǎoléngzuǒ Tángqū
- Yale Romanization: Shènglǎuléngdzwǒ Tángchyū
Yue: Cantonese
- Yale Romanization: Singlóuhlihngjóh Tòhngkeu
- Jyutping: sing^{3} lou^{5} ling^{4} zo^{6} tong^{4} keoi^{1}
- IPA: [ɕɪ̄ŋlo̬ulɪ̀ŋtsɔ̄ː tʰɔ̏ːŋkʰœ́ː]

Portuguese name
- Portuguese: Freguesia de São Lourenço

São Lourenço is a civil parish (Portuguese: freguesia) of Macau. It is located in the southwestern of Macau Peninsula and named after Lawrence of Rome.

This parish was one of five in the former Municipality of Macau, one of Macau's two municipalities that were abolished on 31 December 2001 by Law No. 17/2001, following the 1999 transfer of sovereignty over Macau from Portugal to China. While their administrative functions have since been removed, these parishes are still retained nominally.

It was surrounded by water on all sides except north and Southeast. It neighbours Freguesia da Sé. Penha Hill and Barra Hill (媽閣山) are to the south. The Portuguese governor building and current administrative buildings are located here. The hillsides contain a residential area of luxurious villas.

- Area: 0.9 km^{2} (13.4% of the peninsula)
- Population: 45,600
- Population density: 50,904 persons per km^{2}

== Government ==
- Macau Government Headquarters
- Macau Government House
- Government Printing Bureau headquarters

== Tourist attractions ==
- A-Ma Temple
- Dom Pedro V Theatre
- Leal Senado Building
- Mandarin's House
- Maritime Museum
- Moorish Barracks
- Our Lady of Penha Chapel
- Penha Hill
- Sir Robert Ho Tung Library
- St. Joseph's Seminary and Church
- St. Lawrence's Church

== Transportation ==
- Inner Harbour Ferry Terminal

== Healthcare ==
The Macau government operates the Centro de Saúde de S. Lourenço (風順堂衛生中心) in Fong Son Tong.

== Education ==
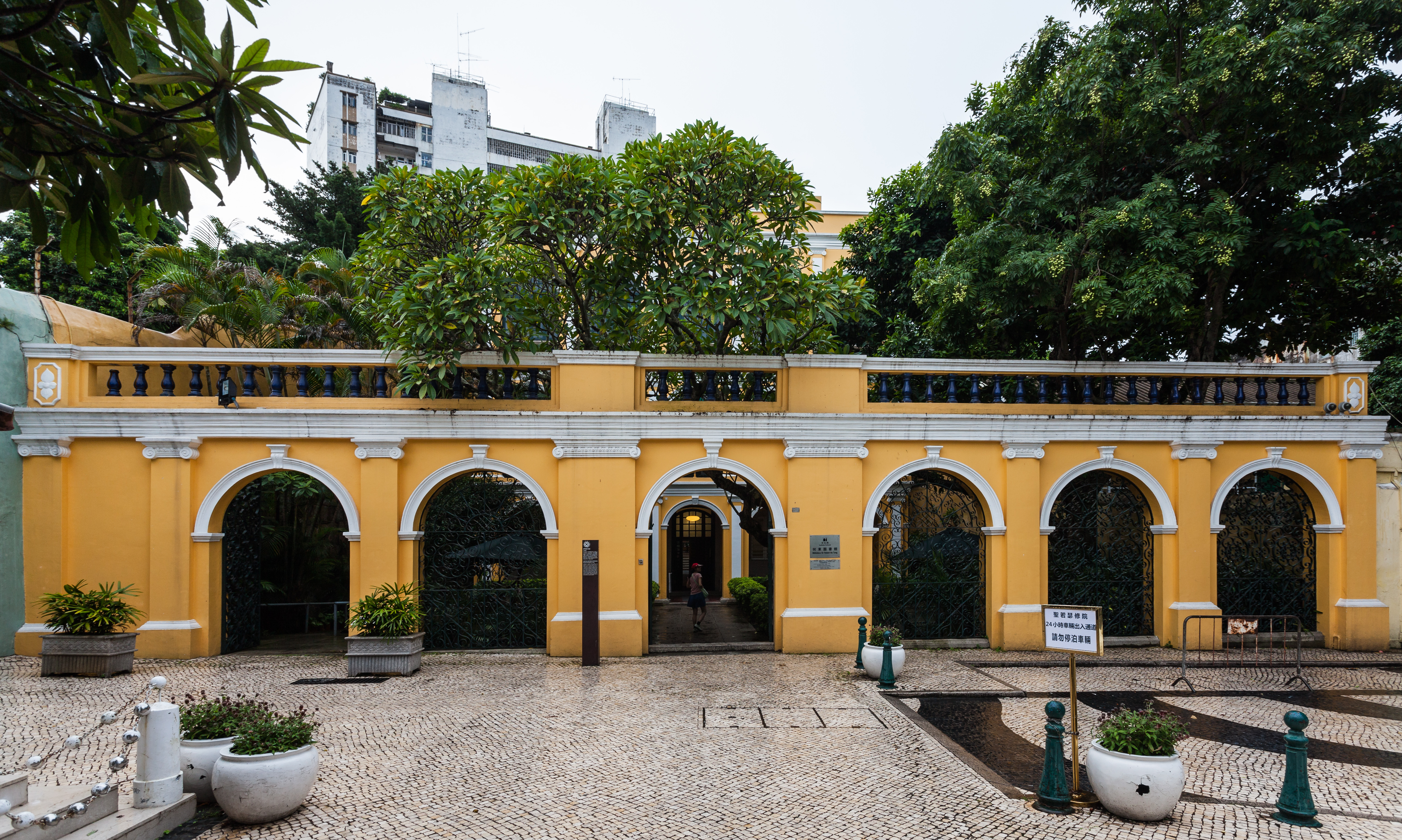
Sir Robert Ho Tung Library

All schools in this parish are private and subsidized by the Macau government.

- Escola Estrela do Mar - Preschool through secondary school
- Escola Há Ván Châm Vui (下環浸會學校) - Preschool and primary school
- Escola Santa Maria Mazzarello (聖瑪沙利羅學校) - Preschool and primary school
- Instituto Salesiano da Imaculada Conceição, primary through secondary school

Saint Joseph Seminary of the University of Saint Joseph is in São Lourenço.

Macao Public Library operates two branches in the parish: the Sir Robert Ho Tung Library and the S. Lourenço Library (Biblioteca de S. Lourenço; 下環圖書館). The latter occupies 1,245 square metres (13,400 sq ft) of space on the third floor of the Municipal Market Complex of St. Lourenço (下環街市). The S. Lourenço branch opened in December 2009 and was a part of the renovation of the market.

== See also ==
- Macau Government Headquarters (Sede do Governo da RAEM)
