= Typhoon Vongfong (2020) =

Pacific typhoon in 2020

Typhoon Vongfong (Ambo)
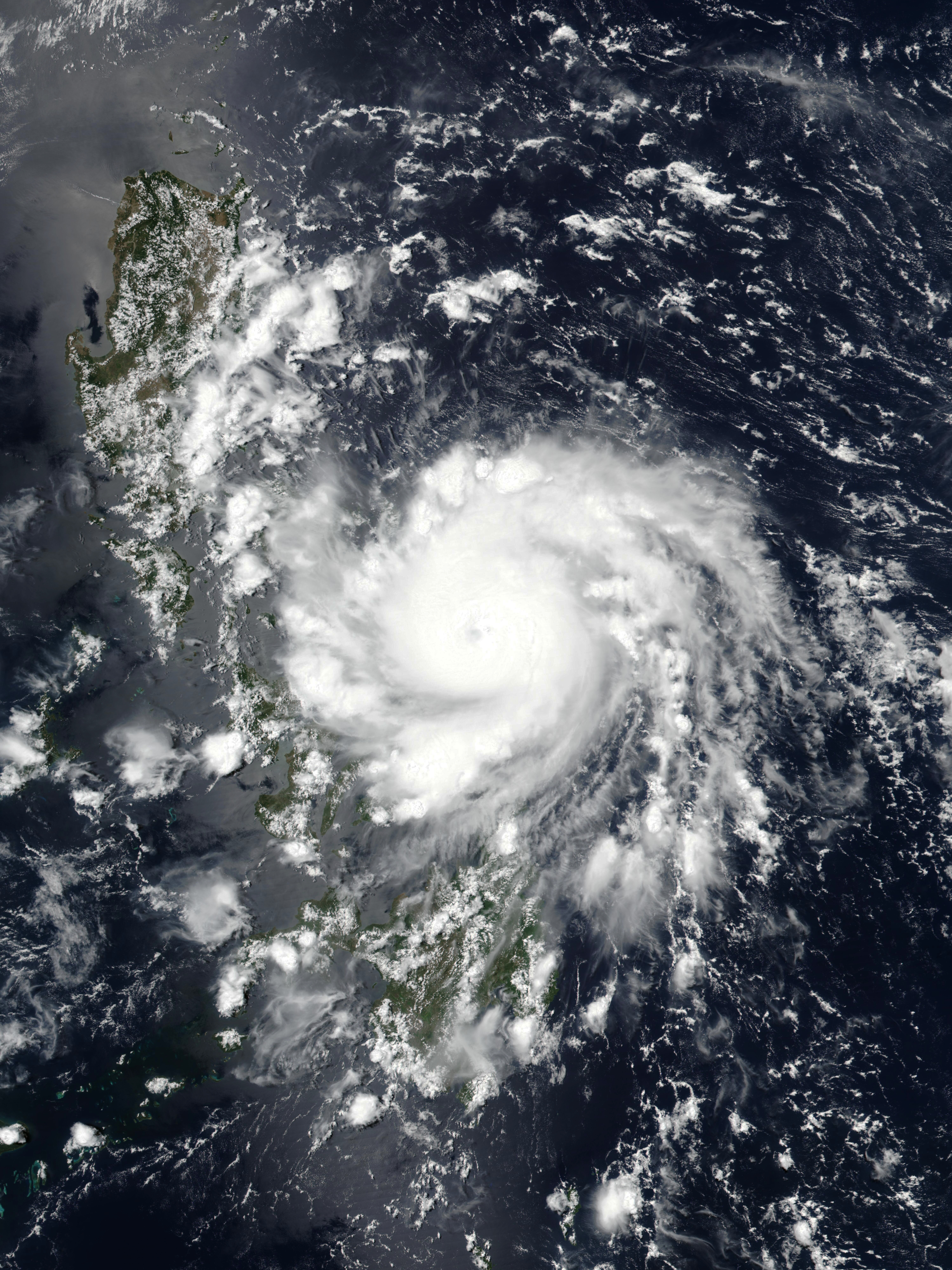
- Typhoon Vongfong approaching the island of Samar on May 14

Meteorological history
- Formed: May 8, 2020
- Dissipated: May 18, 2020

Very strong typhoon
- 10-minute sustained (JMA)
- Highest winds: 155 km/h (100 mph)
- Lowest pressure: 960 hPa (mbar); 28.35 inHg

Category 3-equivalent typhoon
- 1-minute sustained (SSHWS/JTWC)
- Highest winds: 185 km/h (115 mph)
- Lowest pressure: 961 hPa (mbar); 28.38 inHg

Overall effects
- Fatalities: 5
- Injuries: 169
- Missing: 2
- Damage: $50 million (2020 USD)
- Areas affected: Palau; Philippines; Taiwan
- IBTrACS
- Part of the 2020 Pacific typhoon season

Typhoon Vongfong, (Note: The name Vongfong (Cantonese: 黃蜂, [wɔːŋ˨˩ fʊŋ˥]) was contributed by Macau and means wasp in Cantonese.) known in the Philippines as Typhoon Ambo, was a strong and destructive tropical cyclone that impacted the Philippines in mid May 2020. Beginning as a tropical depression on May 10 east of Mindanao, Vongfong was the first storm of the 2020 Pacific typhoon season. It gradually organized as it took a slow northward course, strengthening into a tropical storm on May 12 and curving west thereafter. The next day, Vongfong entered a period of rapid intensification, becoming a typhoon and attaining 10-minute maximum sustained winds of 150 km/h (93 mph). The storm made landfall at this intensity near San Policarpo, Eastern Samar, at 04:15 UTC on May 14. The system tracked across Visayas and Luzon, making a total of seven landfalls. Persistent land interaction weakened Vongfong, leading to its degeneration into a tropical depression over the Luzon Strait on May 17.

Preparations for the typhoon were complicated due to the COVID-19 pandemic. Shelters that opened had to be modified in order to accommodate health guidelines and social distancing. Throughout the Philippines, Vongfong caused around ₱1.57 billion (US$31.1 million) in damage and killed five people.

== Meteorological history ==
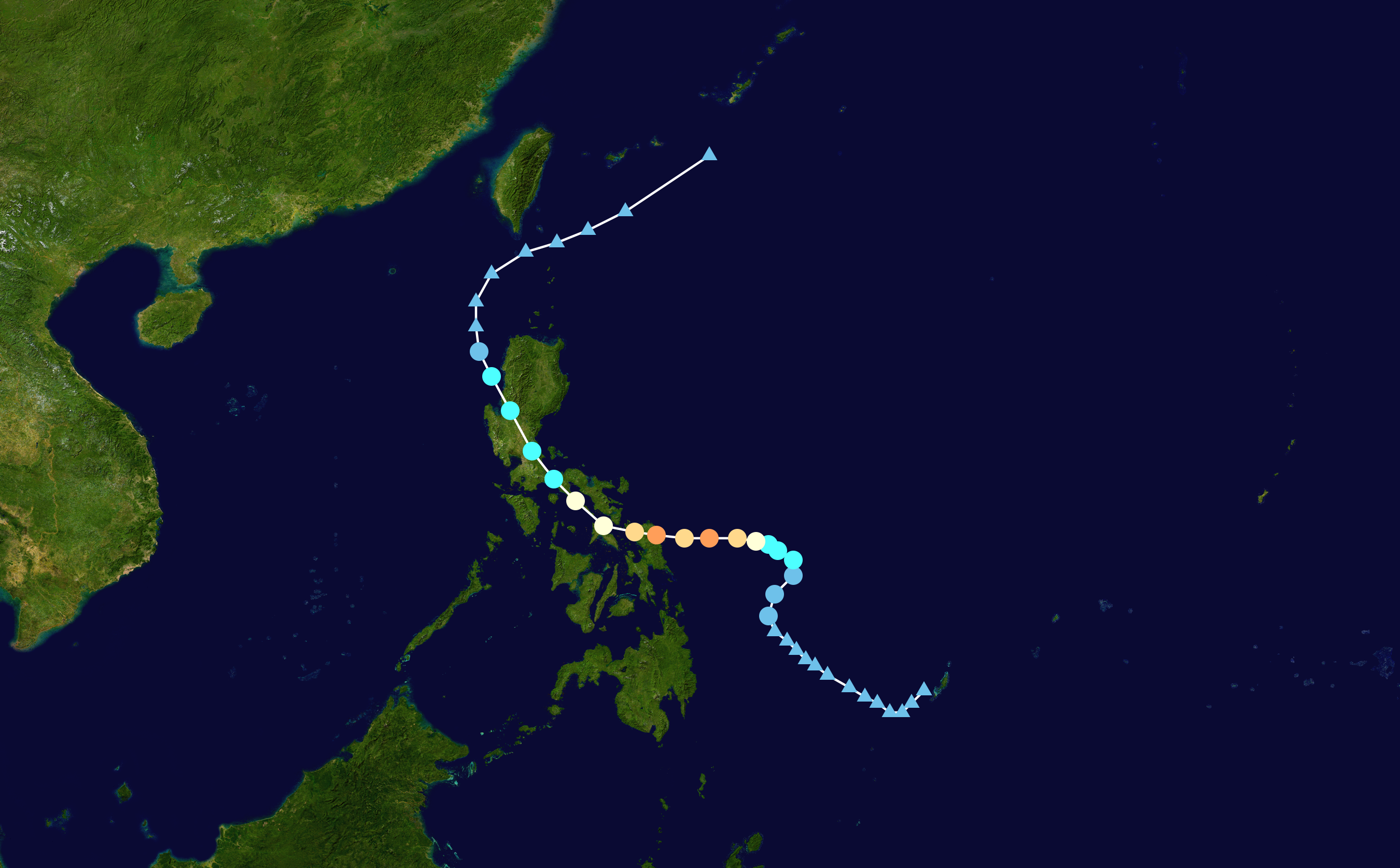
Map plotting the storm's track and intensity, according to the Saffir–Simpson scale Map key Saffir–Simpson scale Tropical depression (≤38 mph, ≤62 km/h) Tropical storm (39–73 mph, 63–118 km/h) Category 1 (74–95 mph, 119–153 km/h) Category 2 (96–110 mph, 154–177 km/h) Category 3 (111–129 mph, 178–208 km/h) Category 4 (130–156 mph, 209–251 km/h) Category 5 (≥157 mph, ≥252 km/h) Unknown Storm type Tropical cyclone Subtropical cyclone Extratropical cyclone, remnant low, tropical disturbance, or monsoon depression

In early May of 2020, an area of atmospheric convection began to persist approximately 545 km (339 mi) southeast of Palau, situated within an environment generally conducive for the formation of a tropical cyclone. However, upper-level wind shear initially prevented much development. Satellite data suggested the presence of broad cyclonic rotation within the disturbance, which was designated Invest 95W by the JTWC. Computer forecast models predicted that the system would track slowly towards the west-northwest. The circulation associated with the storms persisted over subsequent days, and at 00:00 UTC on May 10, the Japan Meteorological Agency (JMA) determined that a tropical depression had developed east of Mindanao, tracking slowly west. Later that day, the Philippine Atmospheric, Geophysical and Astronomical Services Administration (PAGASA) followed suit and upgraded the system to a tropical depression, giving it the name Ambo for Filipino interests; it was the first tropical cyclone within the Philippine Area of Responsibility in 2020 and the first of the 2020 Pacific typhoon season. On the same day, a Tropical Cyclone Formation Alert (TCFA) was issued by the JTWC on the system, noting early signs of rainband development. Though attenuated by the presence of dry air, warm sea surface temperatures, low wind shear, and upper-level outflow supported further development in the storm's early stages as the storm was steered by subtropical ridge. Weak steering currents caused the tropical depression to move slowly northward on May 12. At 12:00 UTC on May 12, the JMA upgraded the system to a tropical storm, assigning it the name Vongfong.

Severe Tropical Storm Vongfong (Ambo) traversing Central Luzon, Philippines on May 15, 2020.

Vongfong's cloud tops were rapidly cooling and consolidating upon its upgrade to a tropical storm, indicative of a strengthening cyclone. The storm also began to develop anticyclonic outflow and curved rainbands. A well-defined eye soon emerged on microwave satellite imagery as the storm's structure became further organized, surrounded by hot towers with the storm tracking nearly due west in response to a subtropical ridge centered over the Northern Mariana Islands. At 06:00 UTC on May 13, the JMA upgraded Vongfong to severe tropical storm status, followed by an upgrade to typhoon status six hours later. The eye became increasingly pronounced and contracted to less than 10 km (6.2 mi) in diameter as the storm's evolution became suggestive of rapid intensification. The JTWC assessed 1-minute sustained winds of 195 km/h (121 mph) at 21:00 UTC on May 13 shortly before the onset of an eyewall replacement cycle; nine hours later, the JMA analyzed Vongfong to have attained 10-minute sustained winds of 155 km/h (96 mph) and a barometric pressure of 965 hPa (mbar; 28.50 inHg). Vongfong made landfall with this intensity over San Policarpo, Eastern Samar, at 04:15 UTC on May 14. The storm's structure degraded due to land interaction as it traversed Samar, causing Vongfong's eye to dissipate. Vongfong made six additional landfalls as it traversed the remainder of the Visayas into Luzon: Dalupiri Island; Capul Island; Ticao Island; Burias Island; San Andres, Quezon; and Real, Quezon. The prolonged interaction with land caused Vongfong to weaken, though the storm maintained a compact circulation amid otherwise favorable atmospheric conditions. On May 15, Vongfong weakened below typhoon status and began to track towards the northwest around the periphery of a subtropical ridge. It weakened further to a tropical storm by 18:00 UTC that day. The center moved off Luzon and became dislocated from atmospheric convection over the Luzon Strait the following day. At 09:00 UTC on May 16, the JTWC issued its final warning on the system. Nine hours later, the JMA downgraded Vongfong to tropical depression status. The PAGASA declared Vongfong to have dissipated on May 17 while over the Bashi Channel.

== Preparations ==
=== Highest Tropical Cyclone Wind Signal ===
Highest Tropical Cyclone Wind Signal issued by PAGASA for Vongfong (Ambo) in each province. The white line represents the best track.

| TCWS# | Luzon | Visayas | Mindanao |
|---|---|---|---|
| 3 | Sorsogon, Albay, Central and Southern Portion of Aurora, Masbate, Eastern Portion of Bulacan, Burias Island, Ticao Island, Catanduanes, Camarines Norte, Camarines Sur, Marinduque, Central and Southern Portion of Nueva Ecija, Quezon, Polillo Islands, Laguna, Rizal | Northern Samar, Northern and Central Portion of Eastern Samar, Northern and Central Portion of Samar, Biliran | None |
| 2 | Abra, Apayao, Rest of Aurora, Babuyan Islands, Bataan, Batangas, Benguet, Rest of Bulacan, Northwestern Portion of Cagayan, Cavite, Ifugao, Ilocos Norte, Ilocos Sur, South and Western Protion of Isabela, La Union, Metro Manila, Mountain Province, Rest of Nueva Ecija, Nueva Vizcaya, Pampanga, Pangasinan, Quirino, Romblon, Tarlac | Northernmost Portion of Leyte, Rest of Samar, Rest of Eastern Samar | None |
| 1 | Bataan, Batanes, Rest of Cagayan, Rest of Isabela, Oriental Mindoro, Zambales | Northernmost Portion of Cebu, Rest of Northern Portion of Leyte, Northeastern Portion of Capiz, Northeastern Portion of Iloilo | None |

Typhoon Vongfong making landfall on San Policarpo, Eastern Samar on May 14, 2020

Heavy rainfall warnings were triggered by the storm's approach for Caraga Region, Bukidnon and Davao del Norte provinces on May 11. The following day, the PAGASA urged residents to begin preparing for the storm, particularly in the Bicol and Eastern Visayas regions and parts of Luzon. Tropical Cyclone Wind Signal 1 was issued parts of Eastern Samar and Northern Samar by the agency on May 13; this was later extended to include parts of the Bicol region. Tropical Cyclone Wind Signal 3 was ultimately issued for parts of Bicol and Eastern Visayas on May 14 as Vongfong neared landfall.

Search and rescue teams in Davao City were advised by the municipal government to be placed on alert for possible landslides and flooding. The 18 Risk Reduction and Management Offices of Albay were activated on May 12. Across the province, at least 35,000 people evacuated, with a total of 80,000 evacuations expected from susceptible areas; mass evacuations were carried out in 15 towns and 3 cities. Due to the threat of flooding and possible lahar flows from Mayon, 515 people evacuated from Guinobatan in Albay. Rice and other crops were harvested early in the province to prepare for the impending storm. The concurrent COVID-19 pandemic in the Philippines complicated evacuation logistics, reducing space available for evacuees; to comply with social distancing guidelines enforced in some shelters, evacuation shelters were filled to half-capacity, requiring more evacuation centers to house refugees. The capacity of rooms in evacuation shelters was limited to three families. Cubicles intended for COVID-19 quarantines in Bulusan, Sorsogon, were repurposed as evacuation rooms for those seeking shelter from Vongfong. As a result of the use of schools as quarantine facilities for COVID-19, some schools could not be used as evacuation shelters. The governor of Sorsogon proscribed the movement of vehicles in the province en route to Visayas or Mindanao. In Northern Samar, 400,000 people were expected to evacuate to unused COVID-19 isolation facilities; at least 9,700 evacuees were enumerated in Northern Samar by May 14. Emergency shelters in Bicol housed 145,000 evacuees. Local government units were compelled to begin evacuations in Calabarzon. Cargo vessel and fishing operations throughout the Philippines were suspended by the Philippine Coast Guard. A suspension of work was enacted in Camarines Norte and Catanduanes provinces and Naga, Camarines Sur, on May 14. The National Disaster Risk Reduction and Management Council (NDRRMC) readied logistics assets and US$23 million in disaster relief aid, while the Department of Social Welfare and Development moved relief goods to areas expected to be affected by Vongfong. One person was killed in Albay after being electrocuted by a wire prior to Vongfong's landfall.

== Impact and aftermath ==
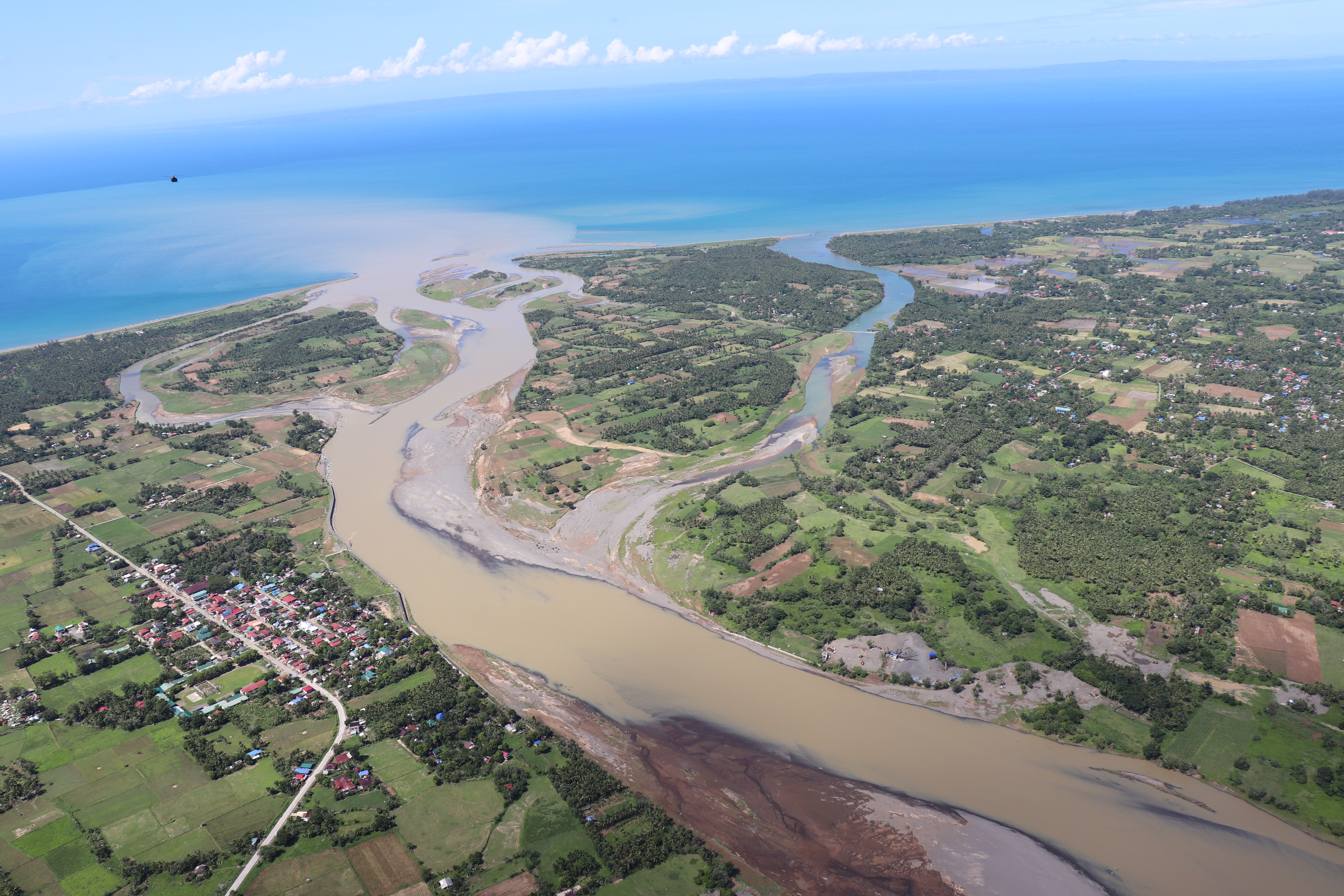
Agos River after Typhoon Vongfong

The outer reaches of Vongfong caused heavy rains in some provinces on May 13, causing flooding in Koronadal. Power outages impacted Eastern Samar, downing communications in several towns. Strong winds damaged weaker homes and fishing boats and downed trees, blocking roads connecting Eastern Samar and Samar. Homes and evacuation centers were damaged across five towns. The roof of an evacuation shelter collapsed, and one person was killed while seeking shelter after being struck by glass shards. Jipapad suffered most extensively of the towns in Eastern Samar, with floods there reaching the second stories of homes and washing out roads, isolating the municipality. Nearly all of the town's populace were displaced by Vongfong. Two people were killed in San Policarpo, where Vongfong initially made landfall, and in Oras, Eastern Samar. In Northern Samar, 2,545 houses were destroyed and another 10,747 sustained damage. The only COVID-19 testing apparatus in Albay, housed at the Bicol Diagnostic Laboratory, was rendered inoperable. The storm displaced over 127,900 residents in Eastern Samar and nearly 15,900 residents in Northern Samar. At least ₱80 million worth of crops in the Bicol region were lost due to Vongfong. Across Calabarzon, Bicol, and Eastern Visayas, aggregate damage to agriculture was valued at ₱185.83 million; the precautionary harvesting of crops prior to the typhoon's arrival was estimated to have mitigated ₱9 billion in damage to rice and corn. According to the NDRRMC, the country's agricultural sector incurred ₱1.04 billion (US$20.5 million) in damage. The agency estimated that up to 20,652 hectares (51,030 acres) of agricultural land was damaged by Vongfong. Nine villages in Bulacan were inundated by 0.6–0.9 m (2.0–3.0 ft) of floodwater. Following the storm, the Department of Agriculture allocated ₱700 million for prompt rehabilitation of the agricultural sector in affected areas. At least two people are missing in Eastern Samar. According to the NDRRMC, 169 people have been injured by the storm while damage is valued at ₱1.57 billion (US$31.1 million) as of May 27, 2020. A C-130 was deployed to Catarman, Northern Samar, on May 18 to distribute food packs to Central and Eastern Visayas.

== Retirement ==
During the season, PAGASA announced that the name Ambo will be removed from their naming lists after this typhoon caused nearly ₱1.57 billion in damage on its onslaught in the country and it will never be used again as a typhoon name within Philippine Area of Responsibility (PAR). In January 2021, it was replaced with Aghon — a Hiligaynon word for a mariner's compass — and used for the first time and only time during 2024 season.

After the season, the Typhoon Committee announced that the name Vongfong, along with four others will be removed from the naming lists. In the spring of 2022, the WMO announced that the name Penha would replace Vongfong.

== See also ==
- Weather of 2020
- Tropical cyclones in 2020
- Other tropical cyclones named Vongfong
- List of Philippine typhoons (2000–present)
