= Printing Bureau =

Government agency of Macau

Chinese name
- Traditional Chinese: 印務局
- Simplified Chinese: 印务局
Transcriptions
Standard Mandarin
- Hanyu Pinyin: Yìnwùjú
Yue: Cantonese
- Jyutping: jan3 mou6 guk6

Portuguese name
- Portuguese: Imprensa Oficial

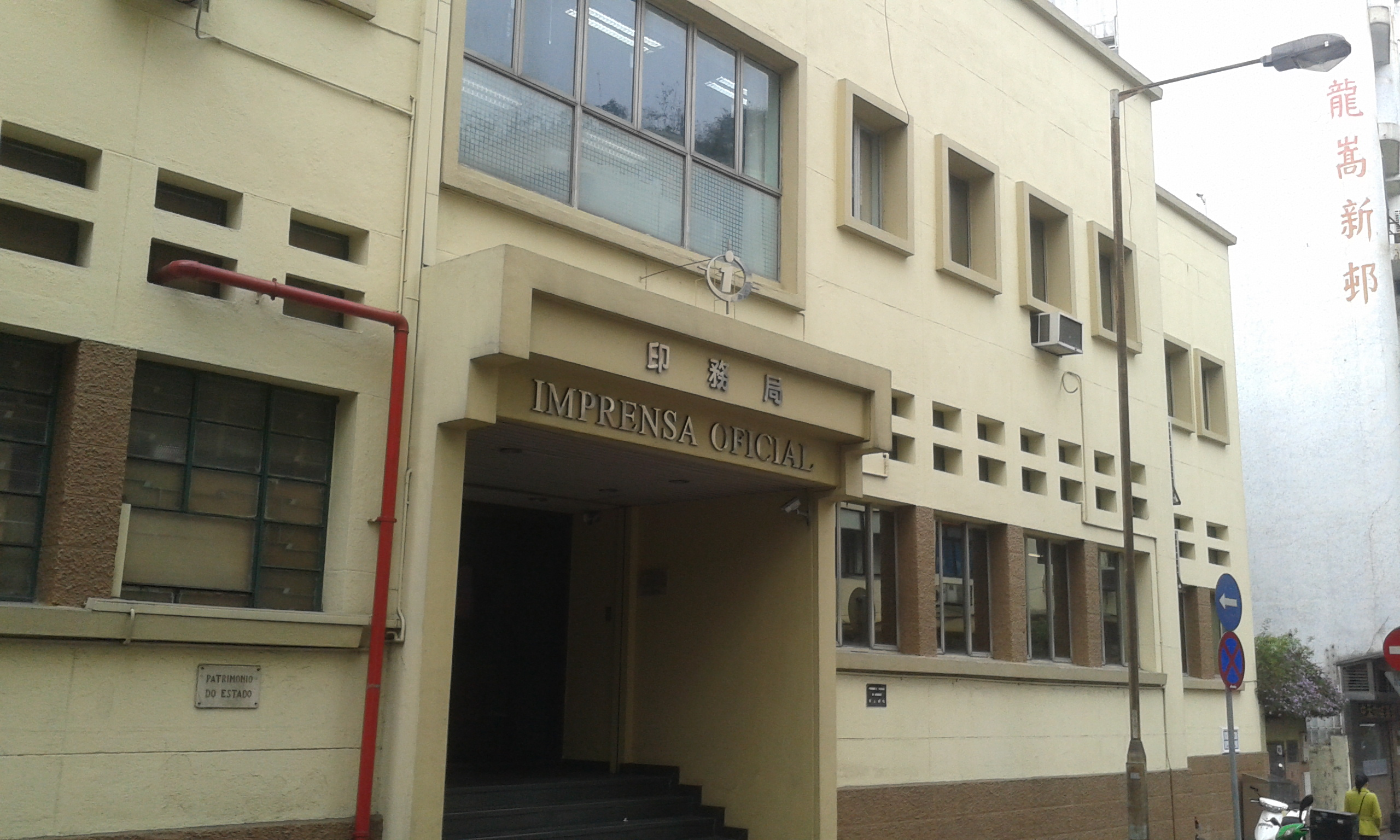
Old headquarters of the Printing Bureau

The Printing Bureau (Portuguese: Imprensa Oficial or IO; Chinese: 印務局) was the publisher of Macau's government gazettes. The bureau was headquartered on Rua de Imprensa Nacional (印局街) in São Lourenço (Saint Lawrence's Parish). It has relocated to the new multipurpose government office building in Taipa before its dissolution in 2025.
