= Macau Legislative Assembly Building =

Government building, in Macau, China

Coordinates: 22°11′00″N 113°32′24″E

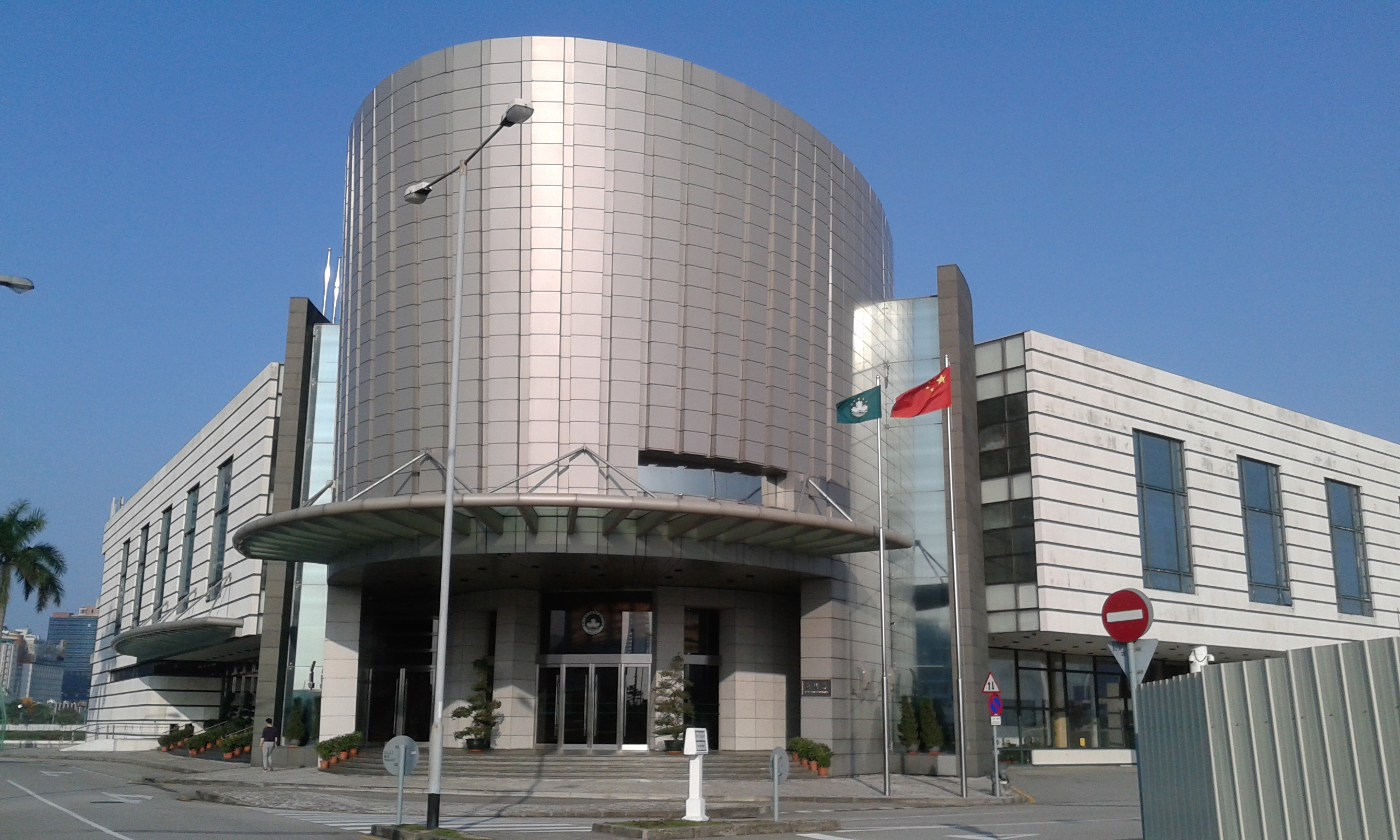
- Macau Legislative Assembly Building

Chinese name
- Traditional Chinese: 澳門立法會大樓
- Simplified Chinese: 澳门立法会大楼
Transcriptions
Standard Mandarin
- Hanyu Pinyin: Àomén Lìfǎhuì Dàlóu
Yue: Cantonese
- Jyutping: ou3 mun4*2 lap6 faat3 wui6*2 daai6 lau4

Portuguese name
- Portuguese: Prédio da Assembleia, Macau

The Macau Legislative Assembly Building (Chinese: 澳門立法會大樓; Portuguese: Prédio da Assembleia, Macau) is the home of the Legislative Assembly of Macau and various government offices in Macau. The building is located in Sé, Macau, China.

Construction began in 1998 and was completed in 1999 for the handover. The building is triangular in shape and overlooks Nam Van Lake and within the Cathedral Parish. The assembly's hall overlooks the lake at the rear. The building is also home to:

- Administrative Offices
- Legislative Assembly member's offices
- Archive and Library
- Auditorium
- Function Hall

The building was built by local architect Mario Duarte Duque, who also designed the Superior Court of Macau Building built next door.

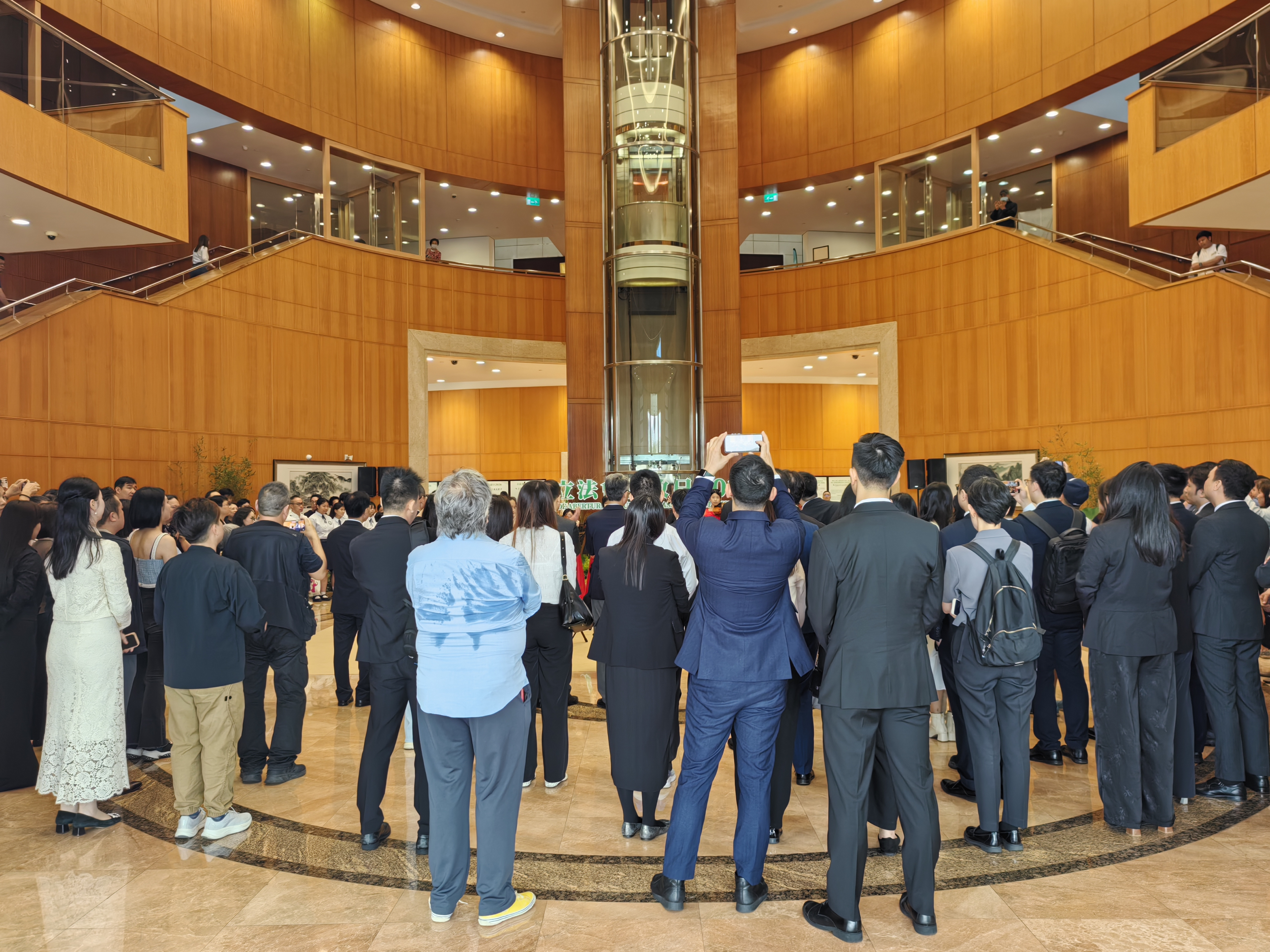
Hall

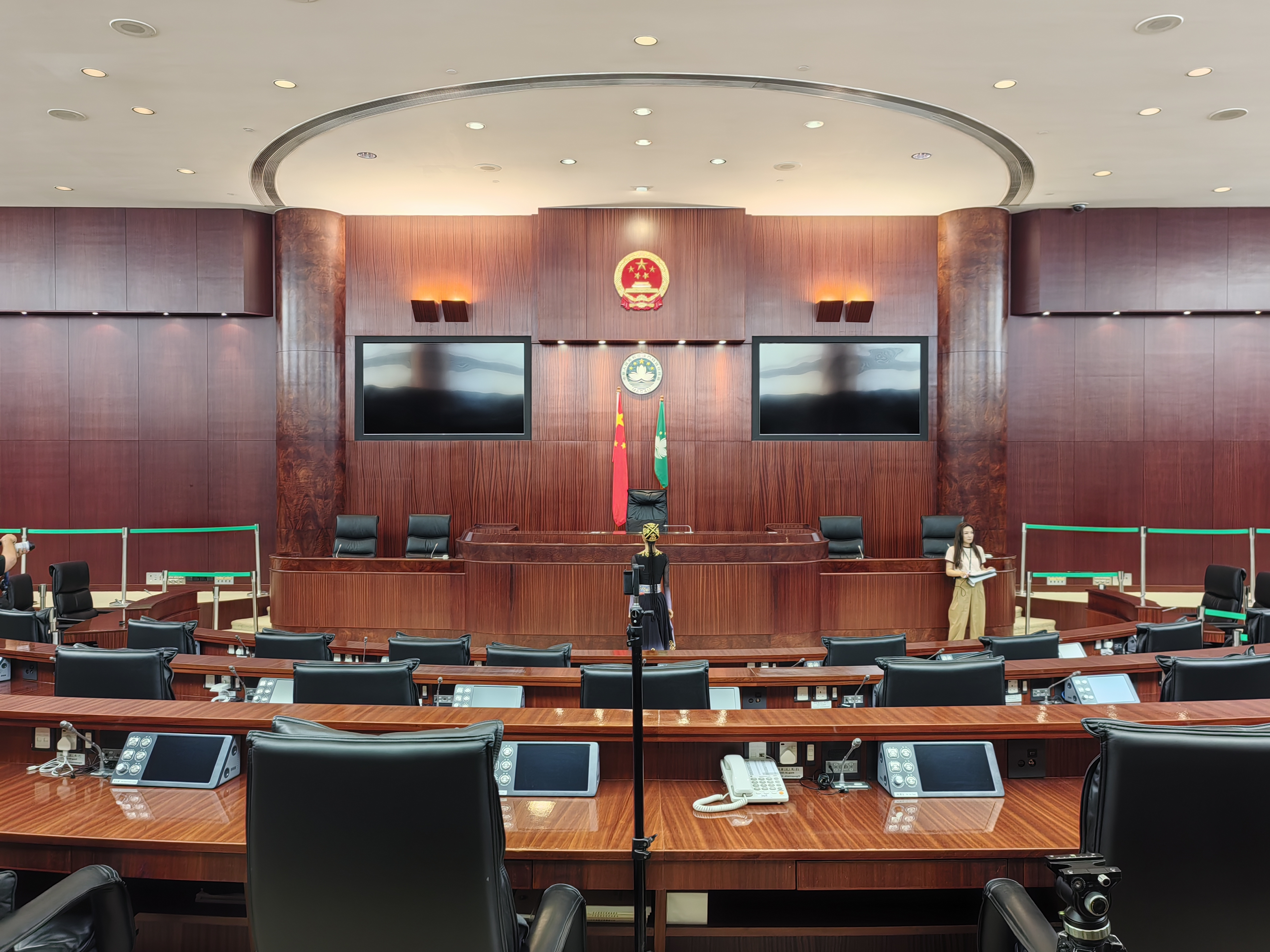
Chamber of Macau Legislative Assembly Building

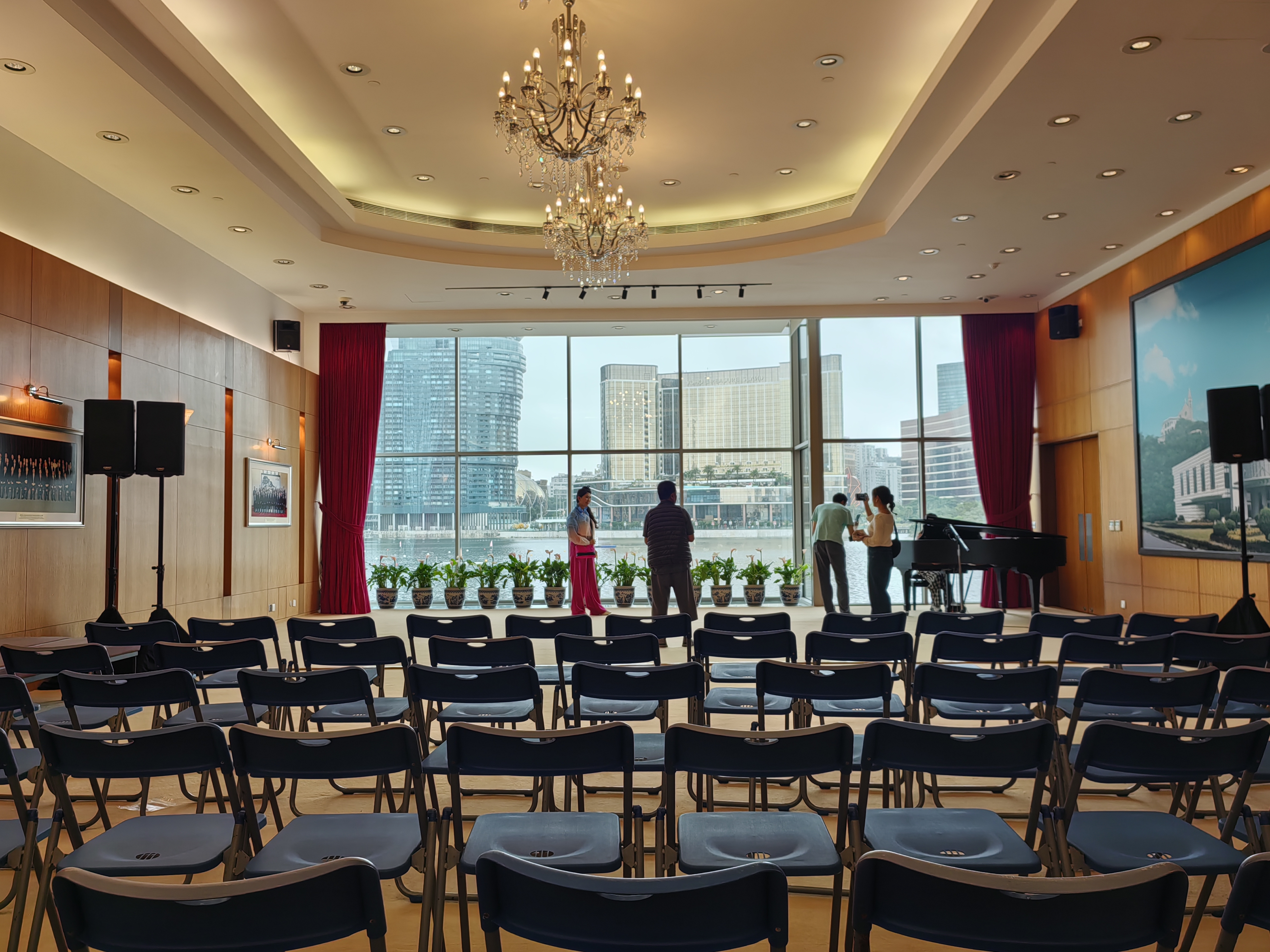
Multi-Function Room

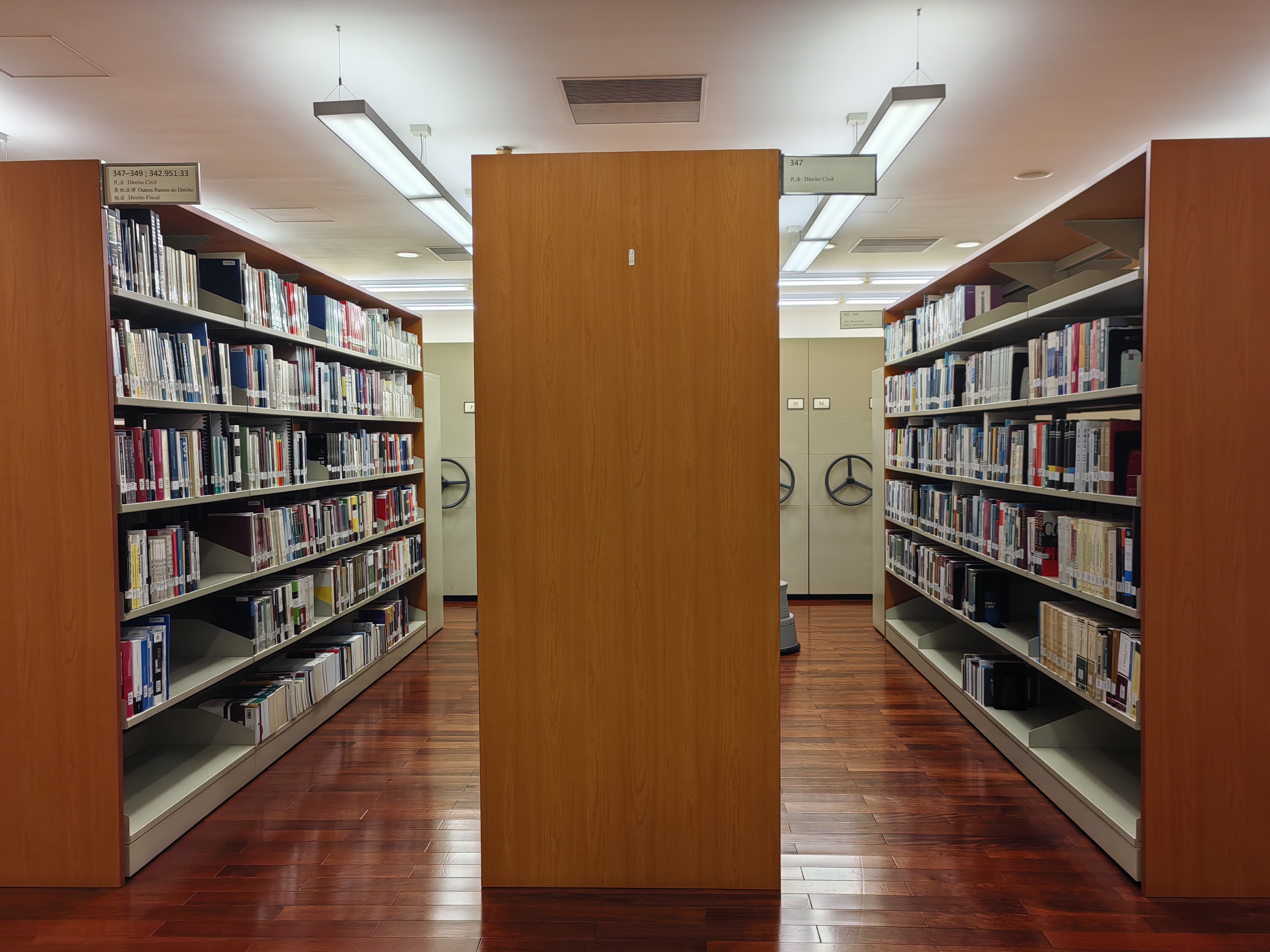
Library

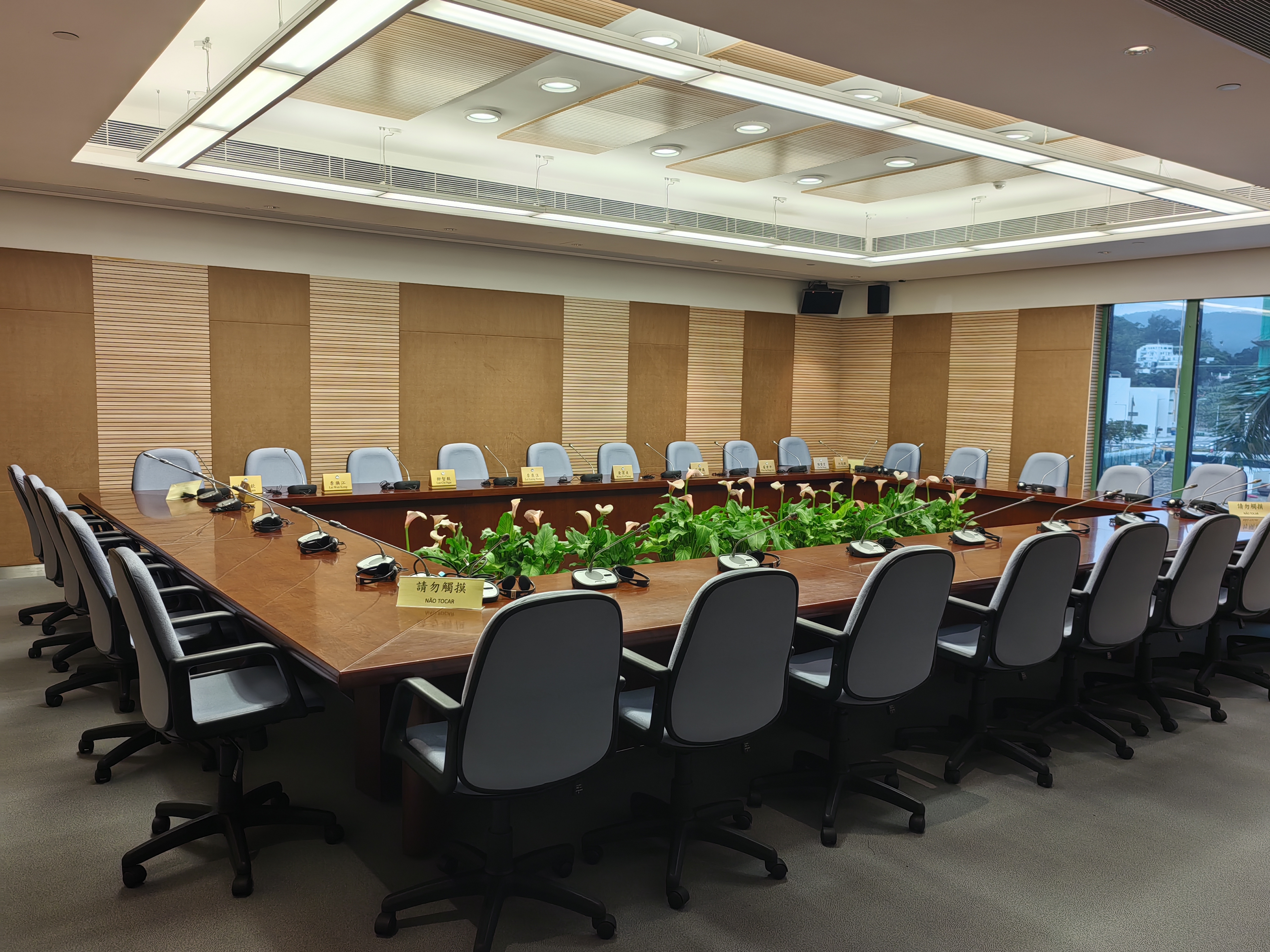
Meeting Room 1

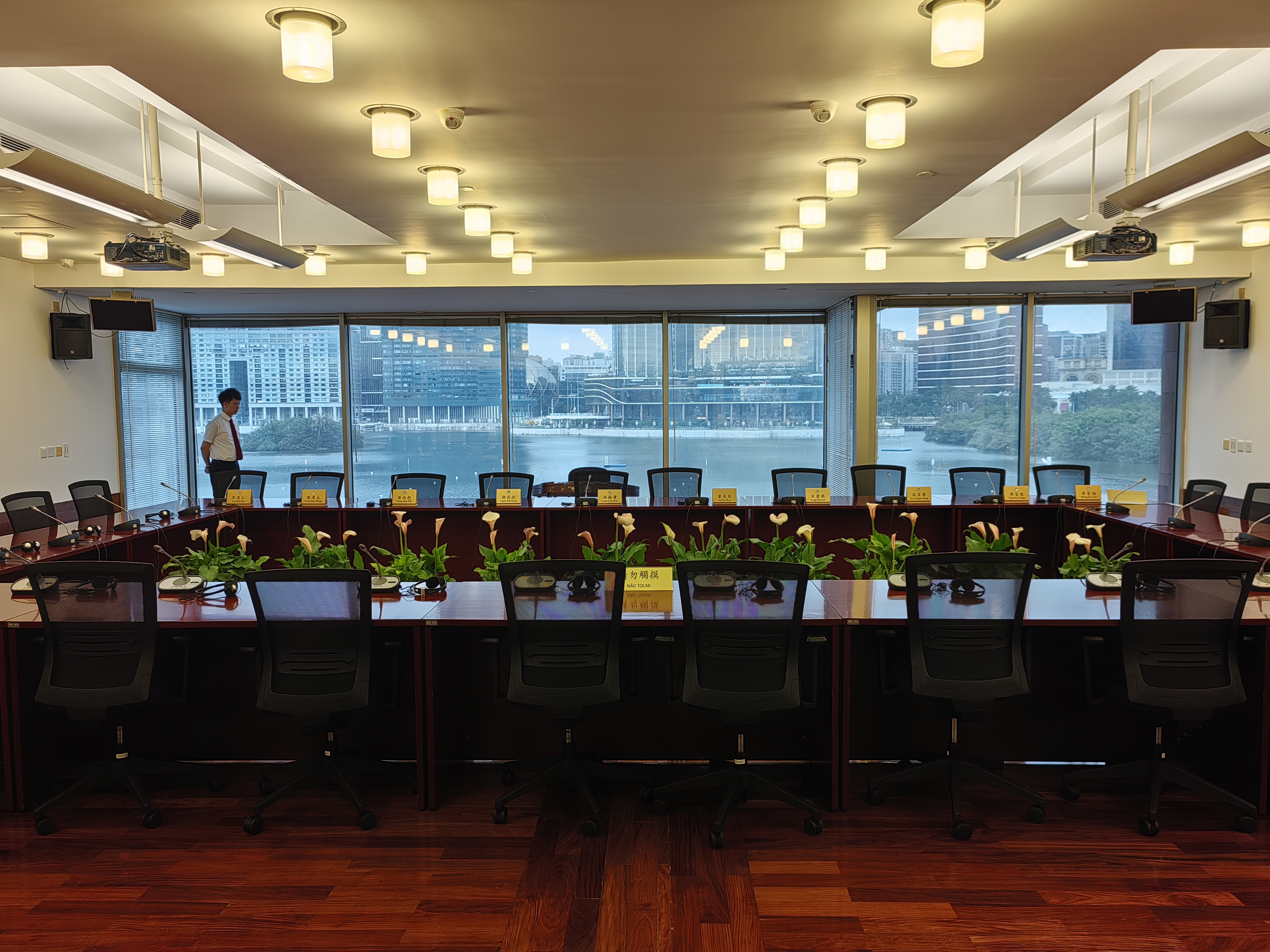
Meeting Room 2

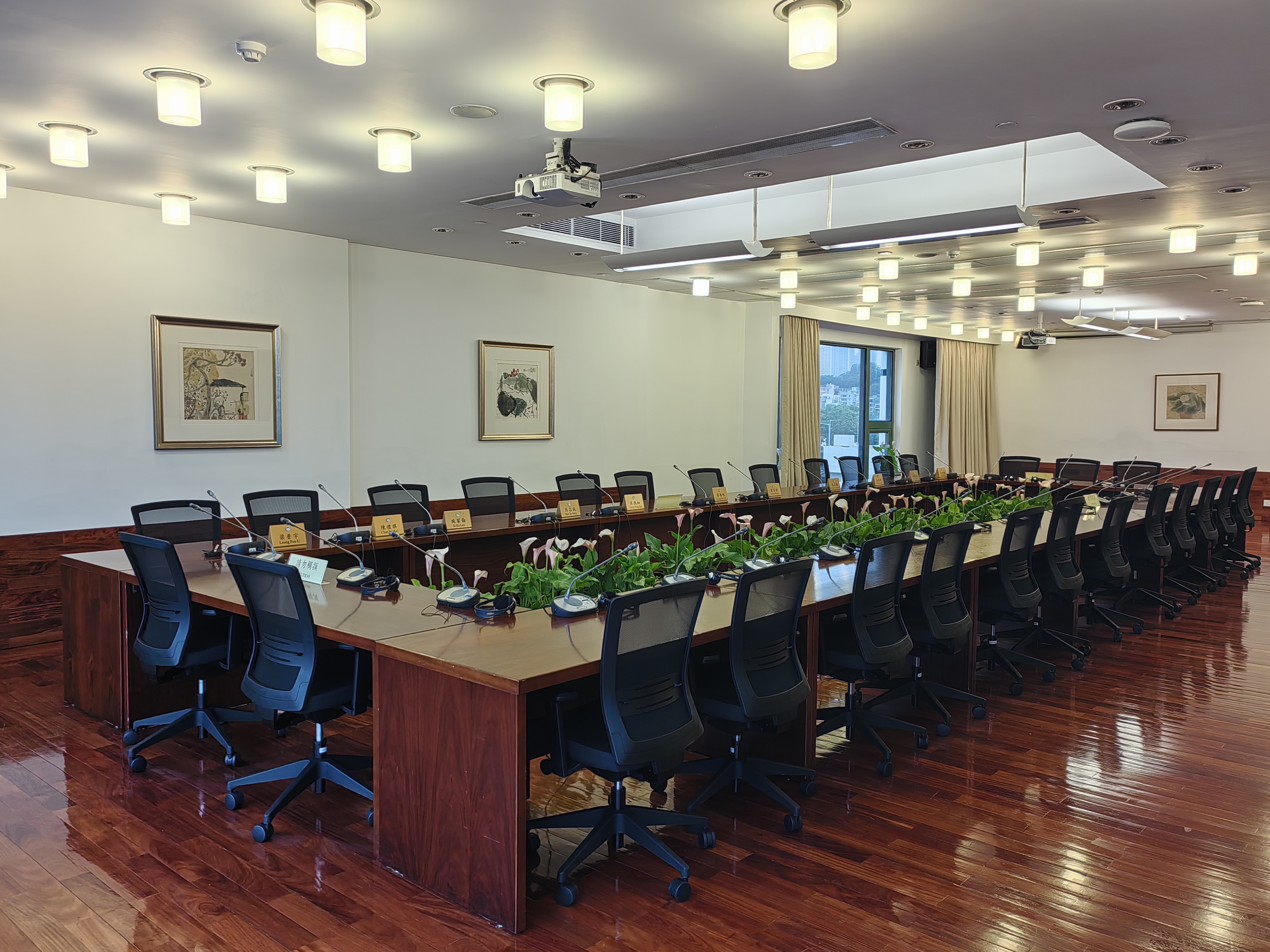
Meeting Room 3

== Previous homes of the Legislative Assembly ==
Prior to the handover in 1999, the Assembly sat at the historic Leal Senado Building.

== See also ==
- Legislative Council Complex in Hong Kong
