= Our Lady of Penha Chapel, Macau =

Church in São Lourenço, Macau, China

Coordinates: 22°11′12.5″N 113°32′6.2″E

Our Lady of Penha Chapel
- Capela de Nossa Senhora da Penha; 西望洋聖堂
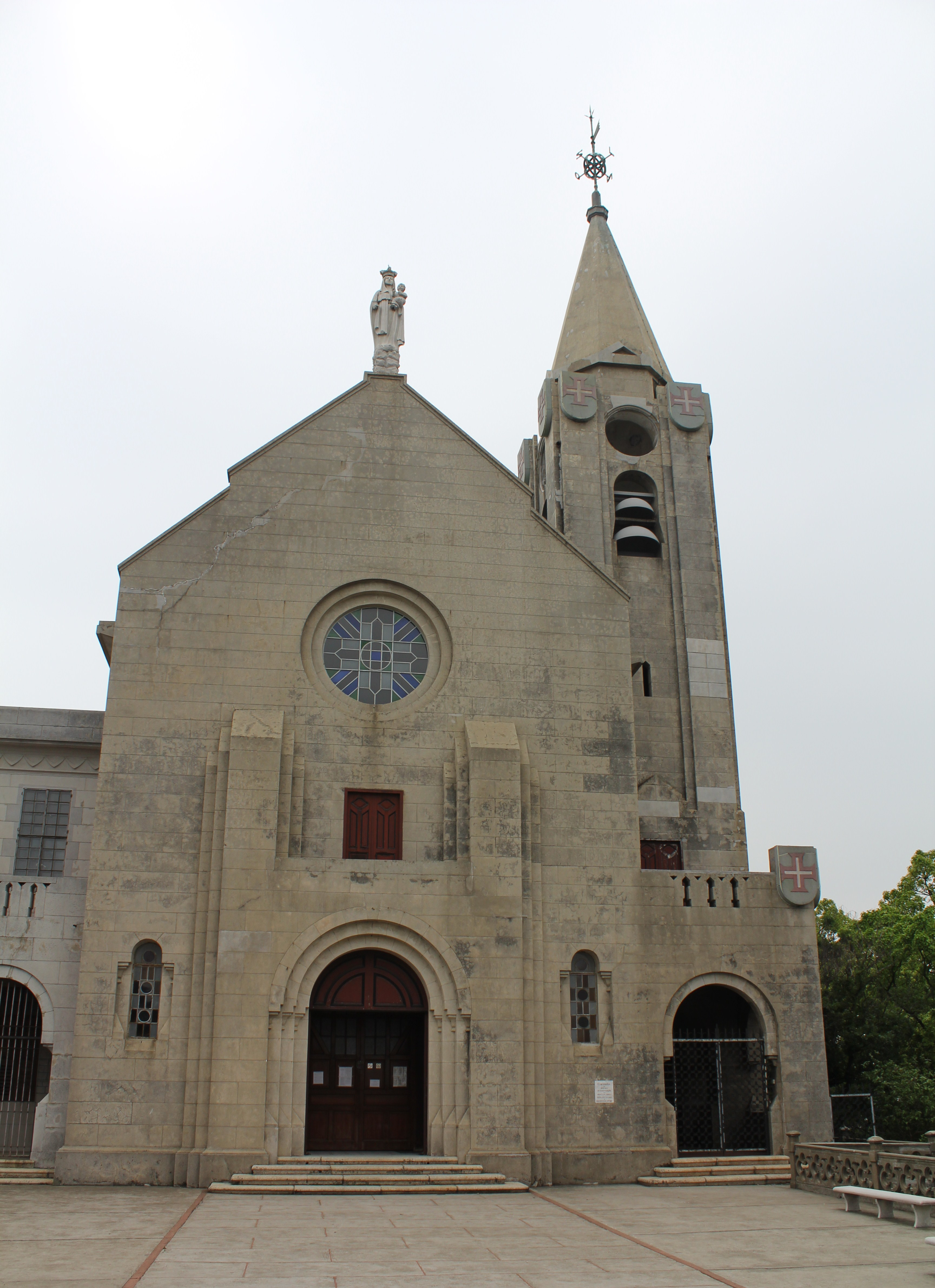
- Our Lady of Penha Chapel
- Location: São Lourenço, Macau Peninsula
- Country: Special administrative region: Macau

Architecture
- Architectural type: church
- Style: Neo-Manueline
- Completed: 1622 (first building); 1837 (second building); 1935 (current building)

Our Lady of Penha Chapel, Macau
- Chinese: 西望洋聖堂
- Cantonese Yale: sāi mohng yèuhng shing tòhng
Transcriptions
Standard Mandarin
- Hanyu Pinyin: Xīwàngyáng Shèngtáng
Yue: Cantonese
- Yale Romanization: sāi mohng yèuhng shing tòhng
- Jyutping: sai1 mong6 joeng4 shing3 tong4

The Our Lady of Penha Chapel (Portuguese: Capela de Nossa Senhora da Penha, Chinese: 西望洋聖堂) is a church in Penha Hill, São Lourenço, Macau Peninsula, Macau.

== History ==
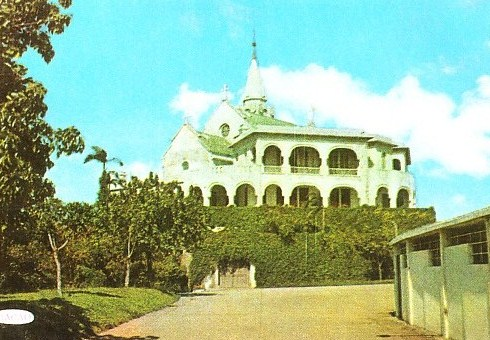
Our Lady of Penha Chapel

The church was first erected in 1622 by the crew of the Portuguese ship São Bartholomeu who had a narrow escape from their Dutch pursuers in the Taiwan Strait while en route from Macau to Nagasaki. The crew vowed to build a church to commemorate the Virgin Mary if they managed to return to Macau, and made good on that promise upon their return.

The land where the church stands was donated by the Senate of the Augustinians for the construction of the church, which was dedicated to the Our Lady of Penha of France. The church was then constructed in 1622 and became the property of the Augustinians until 1834 when they were expelled from Macau. In 1837, the church was reconstructed along with the Bishop residence next to it. In 1935, it was then again completely rebuilt in the Neo-Manueline style.

== Architecture ==
At the front courtyard of the church stands the Our Lady of Lourdes statue. At the steps of the hillside staircase exists the picturesque grotto of Our Lady of Lourdes.

== See also ==
- List of tourist attractions in Macau
- Christianity in Macau
