= Penha Hill =

Hill in São Lourenço, Macau, China

- Colina da Penha
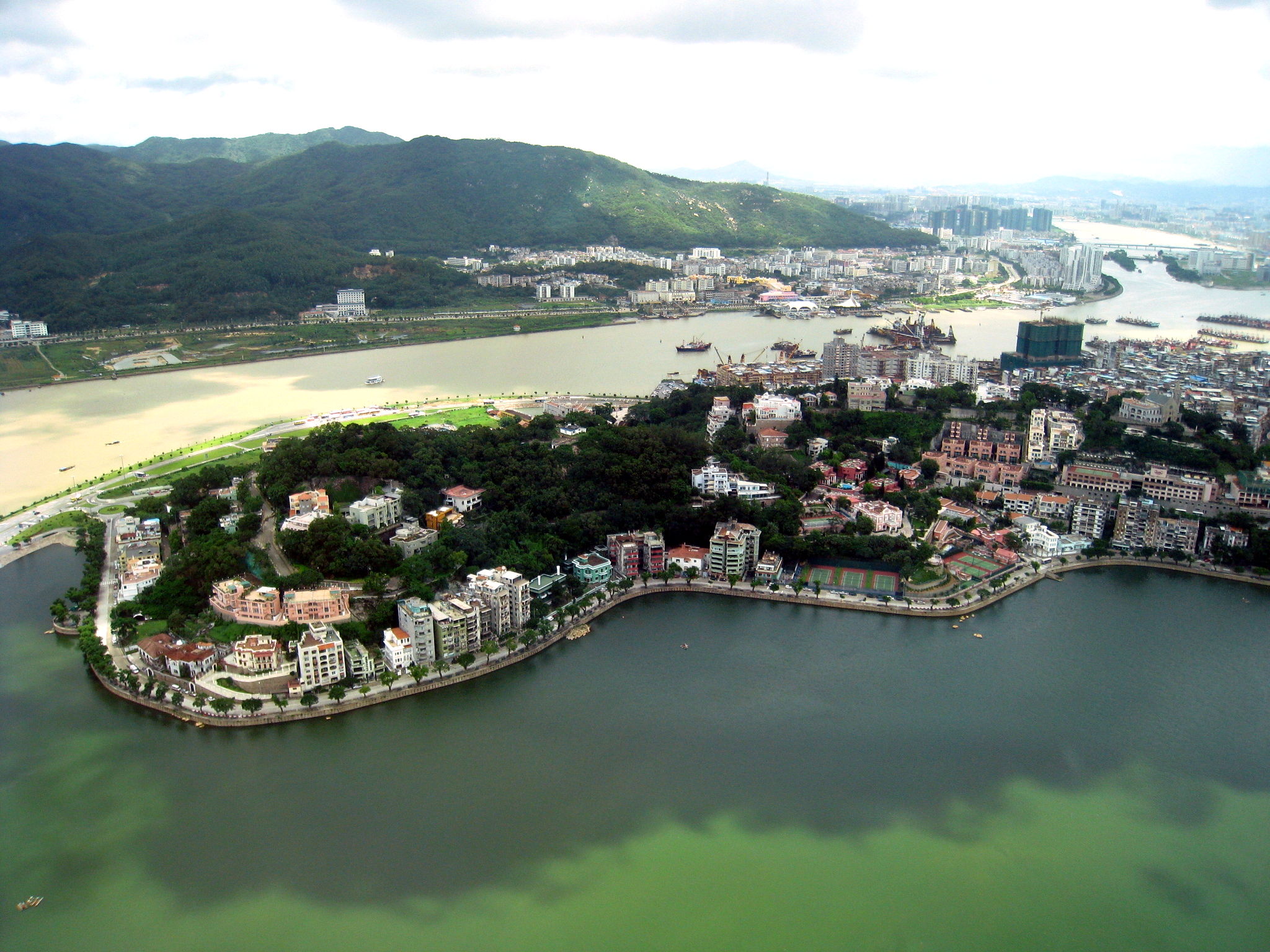

Highest point
- Elevation: 62.7 m (206 ft)
- Coordinates: 22°11′11.3″N 113°32′5.0″E

Naming
- Native name: 西望洋山 (Chinese)

Geography
- Location: São Lourenço, Macau (special administrative region of the PRC)

Geology
- Mountain type: hill

Penha Hill
- Chinese: 西望洋山
Transcriptions
Standard Mandarin
- Hanyu Pinyin: Xīwàngyáng Shān
Yue: Cantonese
- Jyutping: sai1 mong6 joeng4 saan1

The Penha Hill (Chinese: 西望洋山; Portuguese: Colina da Penha) is a hill in São Lourenço, Macau, China.

== Geology ==
At an elevation of 62.7 meters (206 ft) above sea level, the hill is the third highest hill in Macau. On its slope, lays many pieces of granites.

== Features ==
At the top of the hill stands the Our Lady of Penha Chapel. There are also markets, hotels and restaurants around the hill.

== See also ==
- Geography of Macau
