= Sai Van Lake =

- 西灣湖; Lago Sai Van
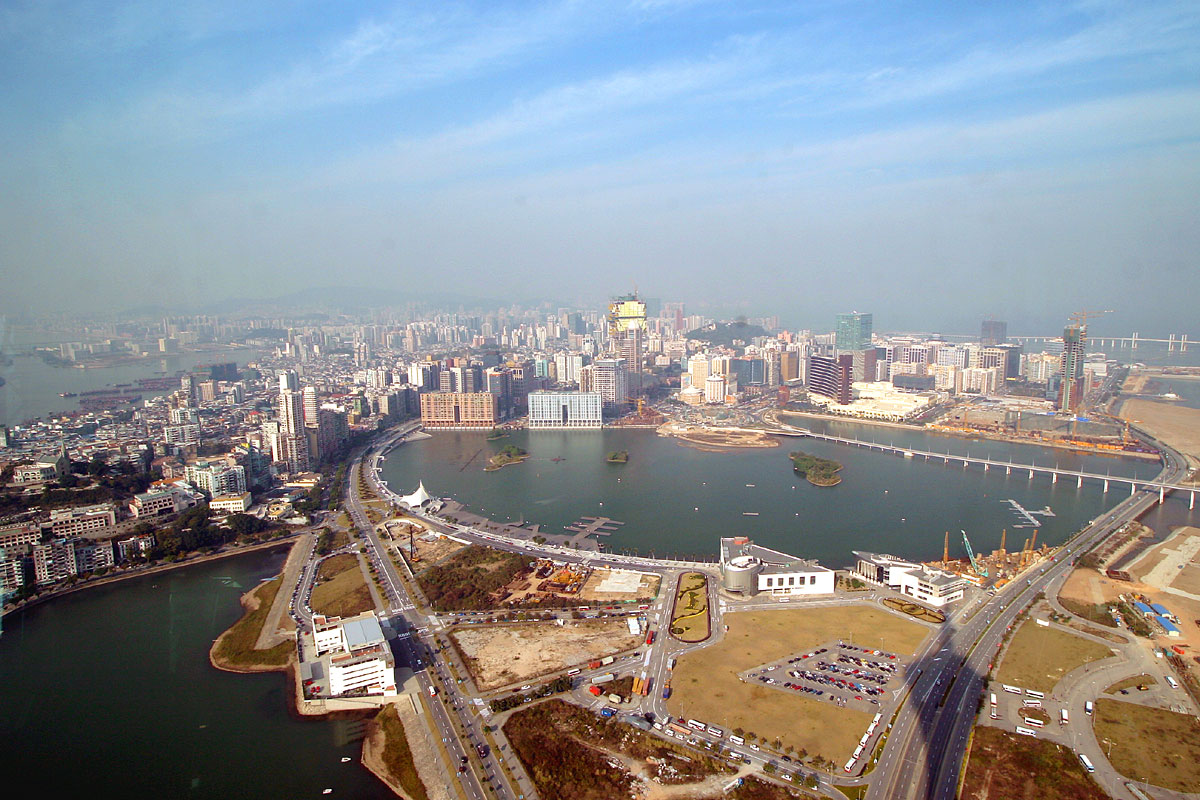
- Sai Van Lake (left)

- Location within Macau
- Location: Sé, Macau Peninsula, Macau
- Coordinates: 22.18287°N 113.53512°E
- Type: man-made lake

Sai Van Lake

Chinese name
- Traditional Chinese: 西灣湖
- Simplified Chinese: 西湾湖
Transcriptions
Standard Mandarin
- Hanyu Pinyin: Xīwānhú
Yue: Cantonese
- Jyutping: sai1 waan1 wu4

Portuguese name
- Portuguese: Lago Sai Van

Sai Van Lake (Chinese: 西灣湖; Portuguese: Lago Sai Van) is a man-made lake in Sé, Macau. It is one of two man made lakes in Macau. It is located at the southern tip of Macau Peninsula.

The lake was once a bay and closed off by infill. Sai Van means West Bay. Sai Van Lake is separated with Nam Van Lake by Avenida Dr Stanley Ho.

== See also ==
- Nam Van Lake
