= Nam Van Lake =

- 南灣湖 (Chinese); Lago Nam Van (Portuguese)
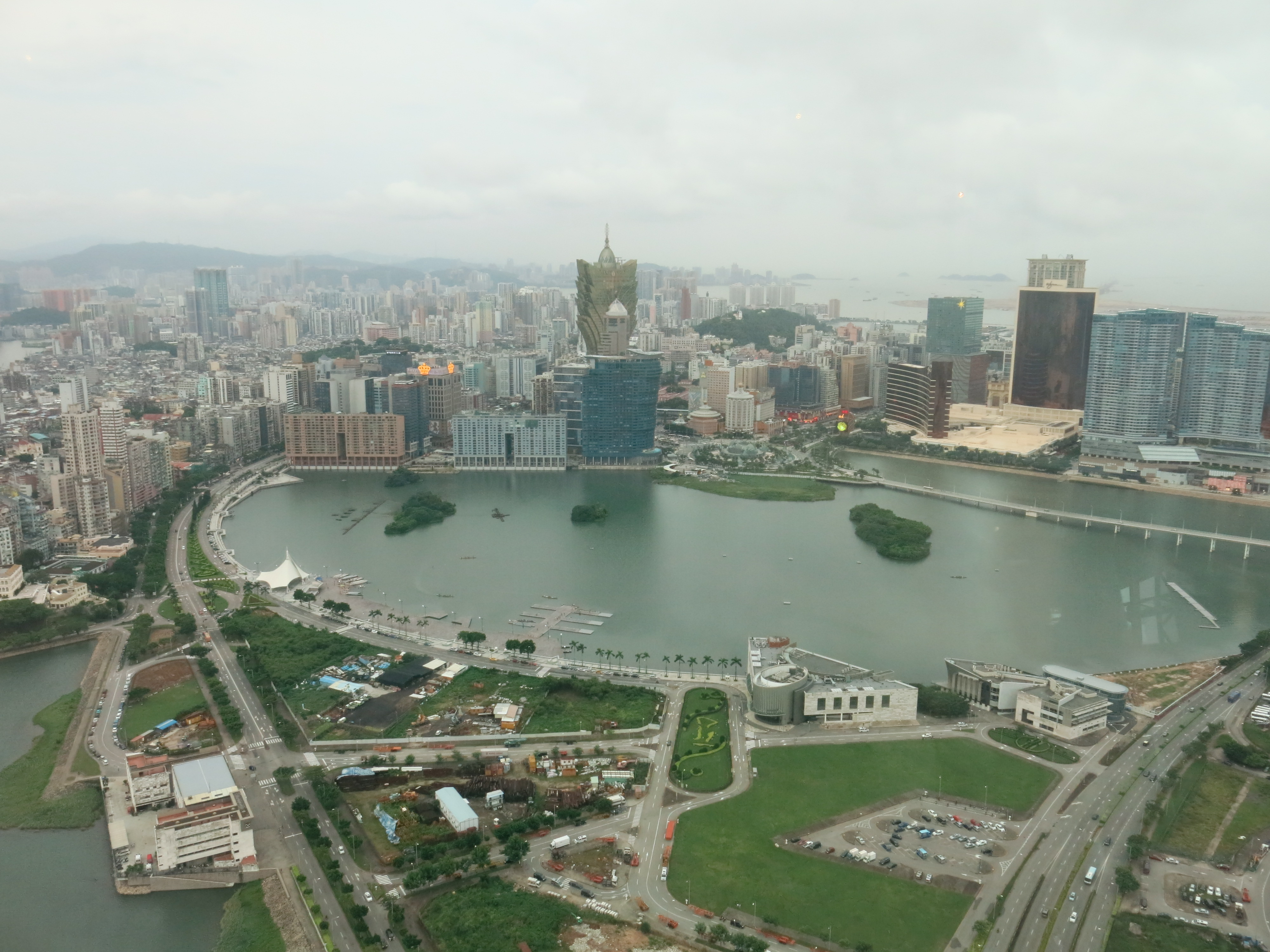

- Location within Macau
- Location: Sé, Macau
- Coordinates: 22.18534°N 113.54198°E
- Type: Lake

Nam Van Lake

Chinese name
- Traditional Chinese: 南灣湖
- Simplified Chinese: 南湾湖
Transcriptions
Standard Mandarin
- Hanyu Pinyin: Nánwānhú
Yue: Cantonese
- Jyutping: naam4 waan1 wu4

Portuguese name
- Portuguese: Lago Nam Van

The Nam Van Lake (Chinese: 南灣湖; Portuguese: Lago Nam Van) is a man-made lake in Sé, Macau. It is one of two man made lakes in Macau. It is located at the southern end of Macau Peninsula.

The lake was once part of a bay (Praia Grande Bay), created when the causeway (Avenida Dr Sun Yat Sen) partially closed off the bay. The project to close the lake began in 1991 to attract more development in Macau. Nam Van means South Bay in Chinese.

Much of the land southwest of the bay was created from landfill.

The Macau Legislative Assembly Building and Superior Court of Macau Building overlook the lake. The lake is bisected by the Ponte Governador Nobre de Carvalho or Macau-Taipa Bridge.

There are four man-made islands within Nam Van Lake. Along with Sai Van Lake, the two artificial lakes cover 80 hectares of space.

The lake is currently used for several water sports, including sprint kayaking, rowing and dragon boat racing.

== See also ==
- Sai Van Lake
