= Pierre-Louis =

Pierre-Louis or Pierre Louis is a given name and a surname. Notable people with the name include:

== Given name ==
- Pierre-Louis Bentabole (1756–1798), revolutionary Frenchman
- Pierre-Louis Billaudèle (1796–1869), priest from, and educated in, France who spent over 30 years of his service in Canada
- Pierre Louis Jean Casimir de Blacas, 1st Prince of Blacas (1771–1839), French antiquarian, nobleman and diplomat during the Bourbon Restoration
- Pierre Louis de Broglie (1892–1987), French physicist who made groundbreaking contributions to quantum theory
- Pierre Louis Napoleon Cavagnari KCB CSI (1841–1879), British military administrator
- Pierre Louis Alphée Cazenave (1795–1877), French dermatologist who practiced medicine at the Hôpital Saint-Louis in Paris
- Pierre Louis Antoine Cordier (1777–1861), French geologist and mineralogist, and a founder of the French Geological Society
- Pierre-Louis Cretey (1635–1702), French baroque painter and one of the leading masters in the Lyonnaise school
- Pierre-Louis Dietsch (1808–1865), French composer and conductor
- Pierre-Louis Dieufaite (1983–2014), Haitian actor, known for his supporting role in the award-winning film Love Me Haiti
- Pierre Louis Dulong FRS FRSE IOF (1785–1838), French physicist and chemist, remembered for the law of Dulong and Petit
- Pierre Louis Dumesnil (1698–1781), French painter who specialized in genre scenes
- Pierre-Louis Dupas (1761–1823), French soldier who rose to prominence during the French Revolutionary Wars
- Pierre Louis Alfred Duprat, Governor in French Colonial Empire
- Pierre Louis Charles de Failly (1810–1892), French general
- Pierre-Louis Ginguené (1748–1816), French author
- Pierre-Louis Van Gobbelschroy (1784–1850), conservative politician of the United Kingdom of the Netherlands
- (Pierre Louis) Philippe de La Guêpière (1715–1773), French architect
- Pierre Louis Jean Ivolas (1842–1908), French naturalist
- Pierre Louis de Lacretelle (1751–1824), French lawyer, politician and writer
- Pierre-Louis Lions (born 1956), French mathematician
- Pierre Louis-Dreyfus (1908–2011), French-born Resistance fighter during World War II who later served as CEO of the Louis Dreyfus Cie
- Jean-Pierre-Louis de Luchet (1740–1792), French journalist, essayist, and theatre manager
- Pierre Louis Manuel (1751–1793), French writer and political figure of the Revolution
- Pierre-Louis Binet de Marcognet (1765–1854), fought in the American Revolutionary War
- Pierre Louis Maupertuis (1698–1759), French mathematician, philosopher and man of letters
- Pierre-Louis Moline (1740–1820), prolific French dramatist, poet and librettist
- Pierre-Louis Moreau-Desproux (1727–1793), pioneering French neoclassical architect
- Pierre-Louis Panet (1761–1812), Canadian lawyer, notary, seigneur, judge and political figure in Lower Canada
- Pierre Louis Parisis (1795–1866), the Roman Catholic bishop of the Bishopric of Langres from 1835 to 1851
- Pierre Louis Prieur (1756–1827), French lawyer elected to the Estates-General of 1789
- Pierre Louis Roederer (1754–1835), French politician, economist, and historian, politically active in the era of the French Revolution and First French Republic
- Pierre Louis Rouillard (1820–1881), French sculptor known for his sculptures of animals
- Pierre Louis de Saffon (1724–1784), French duelist that escaped to exile in the Dutch colony of Demerara, becoming a wealthy landowner
- Pierre-Louis Thévenet, French production designer, art director and set decorator
- Pierre Louis Vasquez (1798–1868), mountain man and trader
- Pierre Louis Francois Leveque de Vilmorin (1816–1860), devoted his life to biology and chemistry, and the breeding and cultivation of plants
- Pierre-Louis (actor) (1917–1987), French actor and film director

== Surname ==
- Damase Pierre-Louis (1894–1945), Haitian historian, statesman, author, journalist and diplomat
- Fabiana Pierre-Louis (born 1980), American attorney and jurist
- Jean-Claude Pierre-Louis, the Chief Executive of Rodrigues Island, Mauritius between October 24, 2004, and March 2010
- Joseph Nemours Pierre-Louis (1900–1966), served as acting President of Haiti from 1956 to 1957
- Kevin Pierre-Louis (born 1991), American football linebacker for the Seattle Seahawks of the National Football League (NFL)
- Listner Pierre-Louis (born 1989), Haitian-French football player
- Manoucheka Pierre Louis (born 1989), Haitian women's association football player
- Michèle Pierre-Louis (born 1947), Haitian politician who was Prime Minister of Haiti from September 2008 to November 2009
- Prosper Pierre-Louis (1947–1997), Haitian artist, painter and contributor to the local school of the Saint Soleil art movement
- Ricardo Pierre-Louis (born 1984), Haitian soccer player, currently without a club
- Sharon Pierre-Louis, American actress

== See also ==
- Pierre Louis de Blacas d'Aulps ministry, Government of the first Bourbon restoration
- Pierre Louÿs
