= Ernest Henry Tourlet =

French pharmacist and botanist

Ernest Henry Tourlet (1843, in Chinon – 1907) was a French pharmacist and amateur botanist.

He studied pharmacy, natural sciences and chemistry in Paris, afterwards returning to his hometown of Chinon, where in 1868 he succeeded his father at the local pharmacy. Up until his death his in 1907, he collected plants throughout the department of Indre-et-Loire. He is credited with creating the most important herbarium in Indre-et-Loire (11,000 sheets of specimens showcasing 1530 species).

He published many of his findings in the Bulletin de la Société botanique de France. His "Catalogue raisonné des plantes vasculaires du département d'Indre-et-Loire" was unfinished at the time of his death.

In 1866 he became an associate member of the Société botanique de France. The sedge species Carex tourletii Gillot ex Tourlet (synonym Carex muelleriana) is named after him.

== Selected works ==
- Contribution à l'histoire de l'imprimerie à Loudun et à Chatellerault, 1900 – Contribution to the history of printing in Loudun and Châtellerault.
- Notice biographique sur François-Pierre Chaumeton (1775-1819), 1904 – Biographical notice on François-Pierre Chaumeton.
- Histoire du collège de Chinon, 1905 – History of the college at Chinon.
- Documents pour servir à l'histoire de la botanique en Touraine, 1905 – Documents utilized for the history of botany in Touraine.
- Catalogue raisonné des plantes vasculaires du département d'Indre-et-Loire (with Pierre Louis Jean Ivolas), 1908 – Catalogue raisonné of vascular plants in the department of Indre-et-Loire.
