= Jean-Baptiste Joseph Tyrbas de Chamberet =

French military physician (1779–1870)

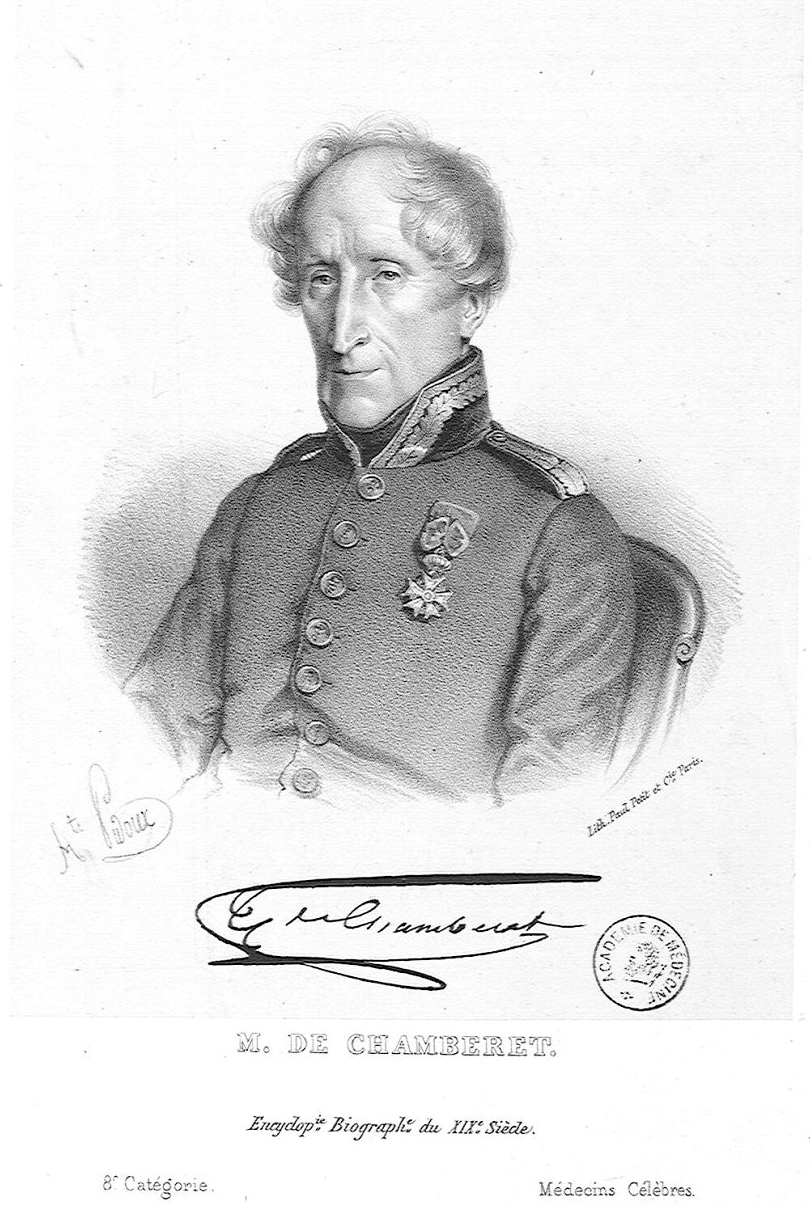
Jean-Baptiste Joseph Tyrbas de Chamberet

Jean-Baptiste-Joseph-Anne-César Tyrbas de Chamberet (20 September 1779, Limoges – September 1870, Paris) was a French military physician.

In 1808 he obtained his medical doctorate in Paris with the thesis "Dissertation sur une maladie de la peau désignée sous le nom de prurigo". Following graduation he worked as a military physician in Italy and then in Spain. Under the Bourbon Restoration he became a professor of hygiene and physiology at the military hospital of instruction in Lille and in around 1840 was appointed professor and chief physician at Val-de-Grâce.

In 1803 he became a member of the Société anatomique de Paris, and from April 1825 was an adjoint-correspondent to the Académie Nationale de Médecine.

== Published works ==
With Jean Louis Marie Poiret and François-Pierre Chaumeton, he was co-author of "Flore médicale" (medicinal plants). Other significant written efforts by Tyrbas de Chamberet include:

- Sur la Topographie médicale de Madrid, 1811.
- Sur la topographie médicale de Talavera, etc. 1811.
- Mémoires d'un médecin militaire: aux XVIIIe et XIXe siècle (with Erwan Dalbine) – Treatise on military medicine of the 18th and 19th centuries.
