= François-Pierre Chaumeton =

French botanist and physician

François-Pierre Chaumeton (20 September 1775 in Chouzé-sur-Loire – 10 August 1819 in Paris) was a French botanist and physician.

He studied medicine, humanities and languages (particularly Greek) in Paris, afterwards serving as a surgeon in military hospitals. Finding military surgery distasteful, he opted for work as a pharmacist at Val-de-Grâce. Severely depressed by the untimely death of his wife, his friends convinced him to leave Paris and travel as a remedy for his melancholic state. After obtaining his doctorate in medicine at Strasbourg in 1805 (graduate thesis Essai d'entomologie médicale), he relocated to Holland, where he remained for several years. Later on, he followed armies to Prussia, Poland, Austria and the Illyrian Provinces, and in the meantime, learned the languages of the countries he visited, while also conducting extensive research in their libraries. In retirement, he settled in Paris, spending the latter years of his life suffering from phthisis.

== Written works ==
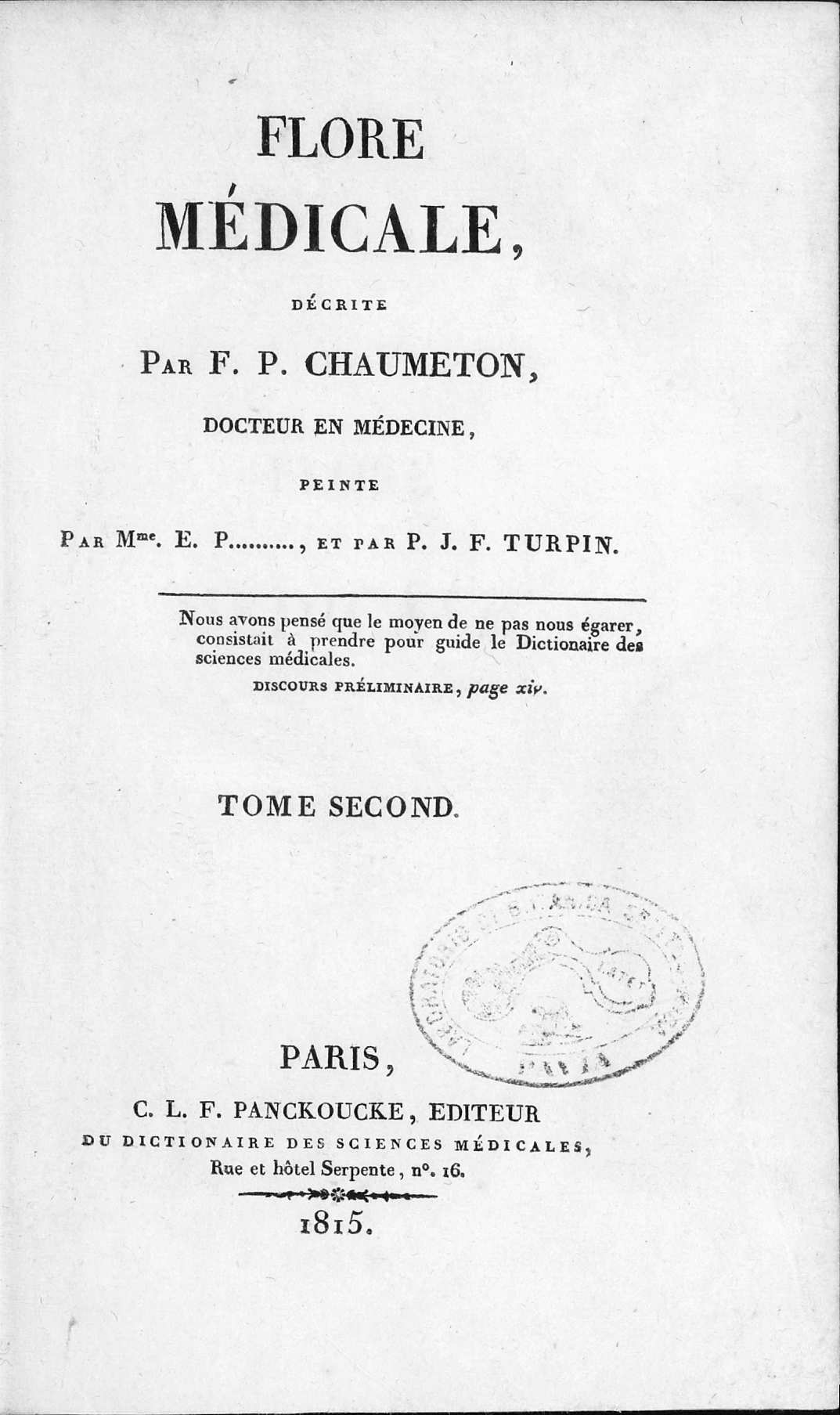
Flore médicale, 1815

He was an editor of the multi-volume Dictionnaire des sciences médicales (publisher Panckoucke 1812–1822. 60 volumes), and with Jean Louis Marie Poiret and Jean-Baptiste-Joseph-Anne-César Tyrbas de Chamberet, was co-author of Flore médicale (medicinal plants).

- Flore médicale (in French). Vol. 2. Paris: Charles Louis Fleury Panckoucke. 1815.
  - Flore médicale (in French). Vol. 3. Paris: Charles Louis Fleury Panckoucke. 1816.
  - Flore médicale (in French). Vol. 5. Paris: Charles Louis Fleury Panckoucke. 1818.
  - Flore médicale (in French). Vol. 6. Paris: Charles Louis Fleury Panckoucke. 1818.
  - Flore médicale (in French). Vol. 7. Paris: Charles Louis Fleury Panckoucke. 1820.
  - Flore médicale (in French). Vol. 8. Paris: Charles Louis Fleury Panckoucke. 1820.

The following are 20th century biographies of Chaumeton:

- Notice biographique sur François-Pierre Chaumeton (1775–1819), by Ernest Henry Tourlet; Blais et Roy, 1904.
- Le Docteur François-Pierre Chaumeton, noble figure de Touraine [1775–1819], by André Jean Brut, 1949.
