= Chapel of St. Clair, Lyon =

Extinct Catholic Chapel in Lyon

Chapel of St. Clair
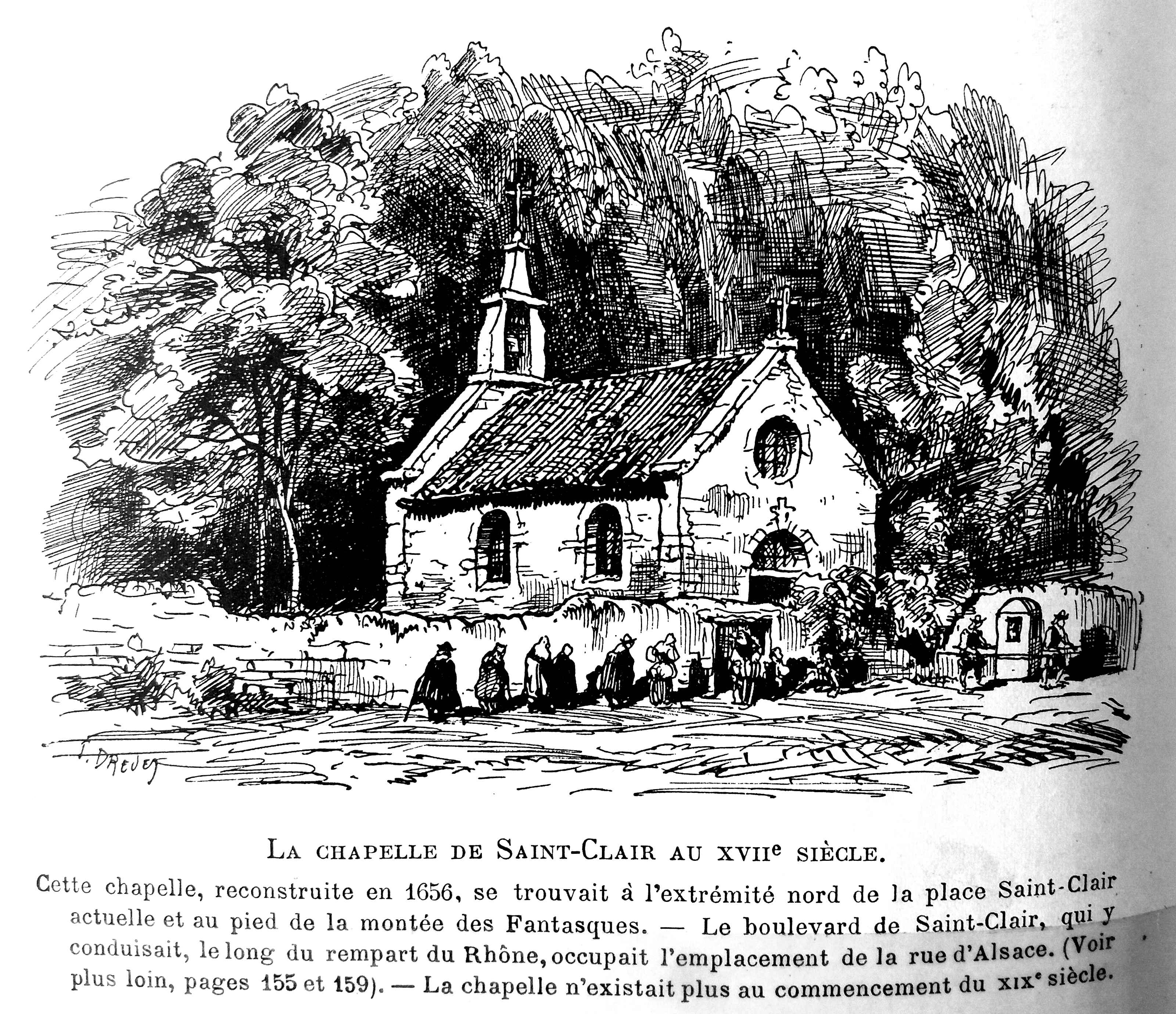
- The chapel after its reconstruction in 1656.

Religion
- Affiliation: Catholic
- Region: Auvergne-Rhône-Alpes
- Deity: St. Clair of Dauphiné

Location
- Municipality: Lyon
- Country: France

Architecture
- Completed: 13th Century
- Demolished: French Revolution

The Saint-Clair chapel is an extinct Catholic religious building located on the Balme Saint-Clair, on the banks of the Rhône, in the 1st arrondissement of Lyon, France. Attested in the 13th century, it was a dependency of the Saint-Pierre abbey. A seclusion was added before disappearing in the early modern era. Used as an almshouse from the 18th century onwards, it was destroyed during the French Revolution.

A chapel of the same name was built twenty years later in the commune of Caluire-et-Cuire, thus changing parish. In the 20th century, it was replaced by Saint-Clair church in the same commune.

His name spread across the whole of the Lyonnais balme, and later became the name of the Saint-Clair district as well as several of its sites and buildings.

== Saint Clair ==
Saint Clair was a Catholic abbot who lived in the 6th century. Celebrated in Lyon on January 2, a public holiday in all the city's courtyards, he is the patron saint of glassmakers. In 1619, the latter joined forces with painters, protected by Saint Luc, to replace the first chapel on the left of Saint-Bonaventure church, dedicated to Mary, with their patrons. They were replaced two hundred years later by St. Francis of Assisi.

== History ==
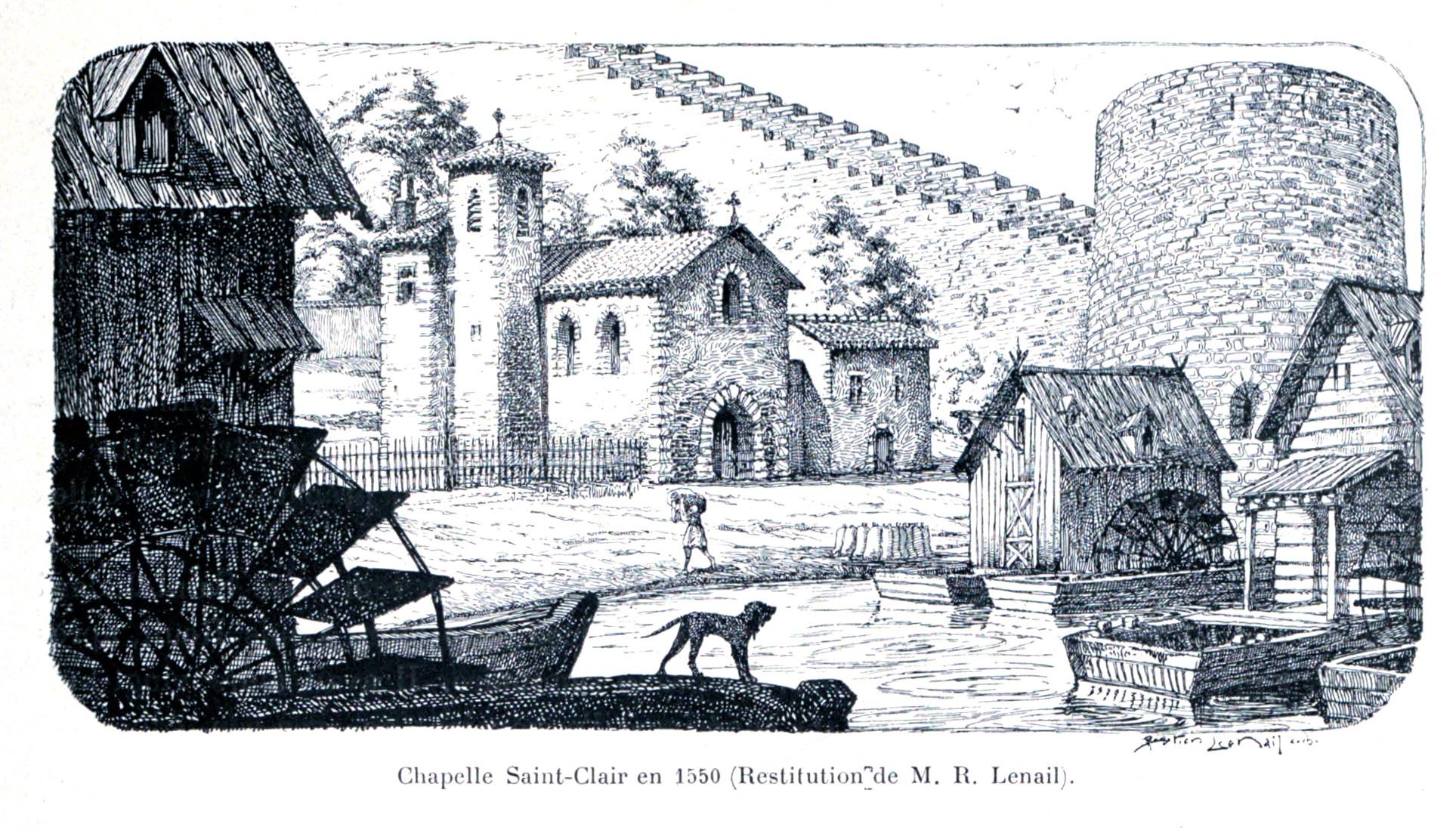
Restitution of the chapel by Rogatien Le Nail, with rampart and ship mills.

A chapel dedicated to Saint Blandina is attested in the 13th century on the grounds of the Saint-Pierre abbey. A recluserie known as Saint-Irénée was built next door, and the whole complex was later named after Saint Clair. The name is sometimes spelled Saint-Cler, and compounded as Saint-Clair du Griffon; le Griffon was a nearby district. This recluserie, one of the most famous of the eleven in Lyon in the Middle Ages, was known for curing mainly sight-related illnesses; Jeanne de la Boisse was installed there as a recluse in 1258. Saint Clair is thus the abbey's secondary patron.

The nine Lyonnais recluseries located inside the city walls, which were mainly active between the 11th and 13th centuries, no longer existed in the 16th century. In a deed of 1618, the Saint-Clair chapel is mentioned as a former recluserie, known as Saint-Irénée. At the time, it was a simple devotional chapel with no fixed services. It was, however, rebuilt in 1656 and, by the mid-18th century, it was used as an almshouse, a function that continued until the French Revolution.

The nuns of Saint-Pierre Abbey sold part of their property to cover the cost of extending and repairing their church. The agreement was signed on December 12, 1742, with Breton, Desraisses, Léonard Milanais and Jacques-Germain Soufflot, for the sum of 50,000 pounds. It includes the "tenement of houses, garden and vineyards, including the Saint-Clair chapel and related buildings, with the small square in front of the chapel's entrance door". However, the chapel was to remain in its current state until worship could be transferred, or until it could be rebuilt to the same dimensions. It was demolished during the French Revolution.

== Description ==
The Lyonnaise chapel was located north of the Place Saint-Clair, before the Croix-Rousse rampart, near the Bastion Saint-Clair. Today, this square is called Louis Chazette. On a cadastral plan dating from 1755 or 1756, the chapel's footprint measures 45 feet long by 19 feet wide. (Note: That's 15.4 meters long and 6.5 meters wide, with Lyon's foot measuring approximately 34.25 centimeters.)

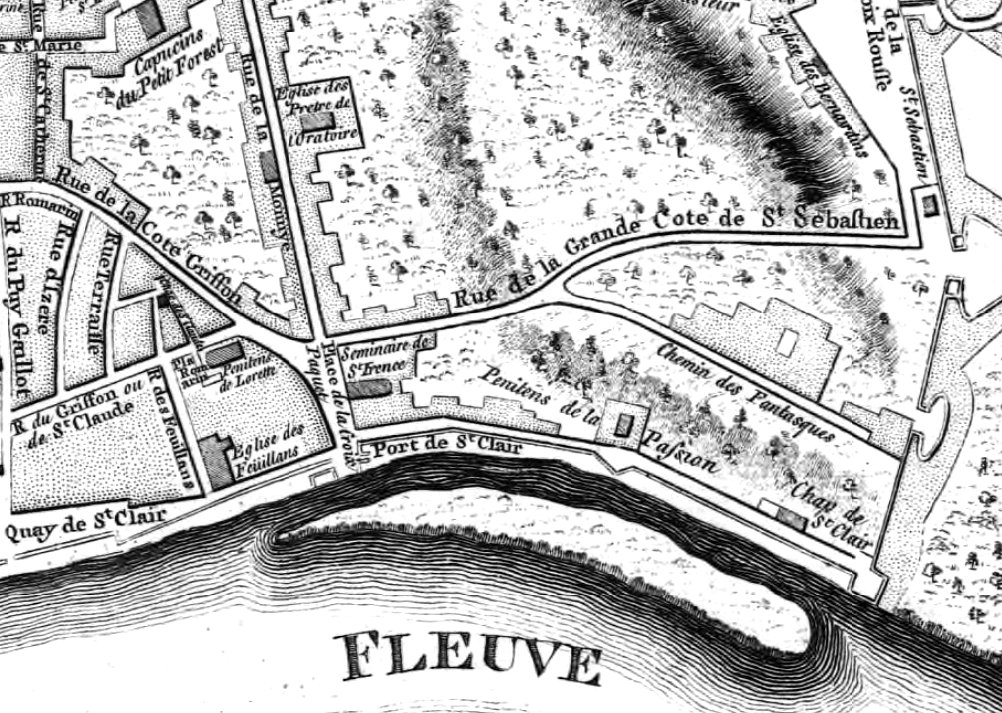
Location on Séraucourt's plan in 1746

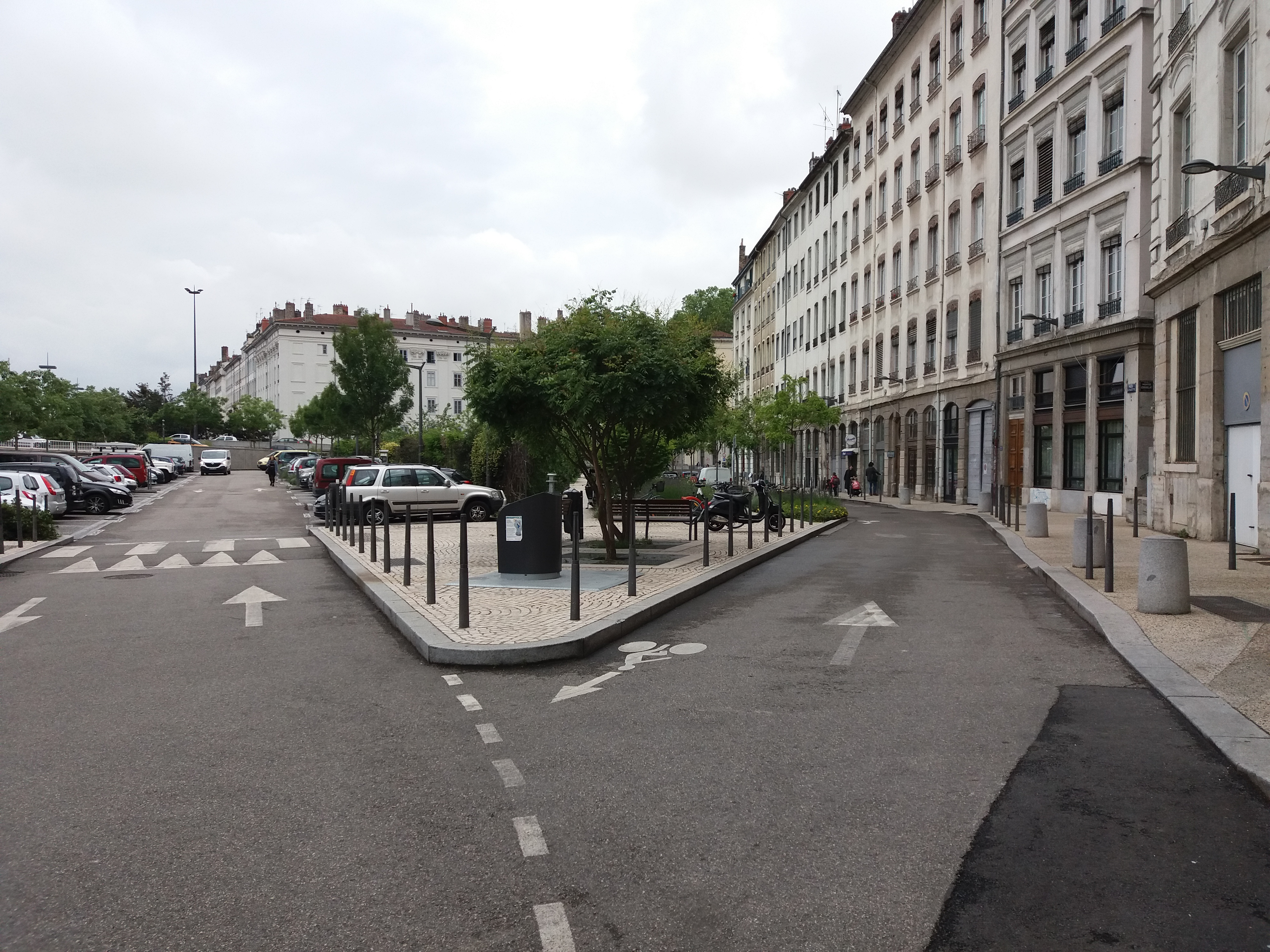
Louis Chazette Square in 2019

== Posterity ==
The recluserie and chapel's name Saint-Clair was given to the gate that pierced the ramparts towards the port, to the port itself and to the nearby bastion. In the second half of the 18th century, Jacques-Germain Soufflot laid out the Place Tolozan and Place Saint-Clair and, on the banks of the Rhône, the Quai Saint-Clair. the Pont Morand, at Place des Terreaux, was named Saint-Clair when it opened. The Pont Louis-Philippe, built opposite Place Saint-Clair in 1846, was renamed Pont Saint-Clair in 1848.

After the demolition of the chapel, the inhabitants asked for a new place of worship: another Saint-Clair chapel was built on land in Caluire-et-Cuire, 3 kilometers northeast of the former recluserie, and became part of the Caluire parish: it was blessed on December 18, 1809. Having outgrown its space, the church of Saint-Clair was built in the same commune, between 1887 and 1926, by Louis Sainte-Marie Perrin. The parish gave its name to the Saint-Clair district, which includes Grande Rue de Saint-Clair and the Lyon-Saint-Clair train station.

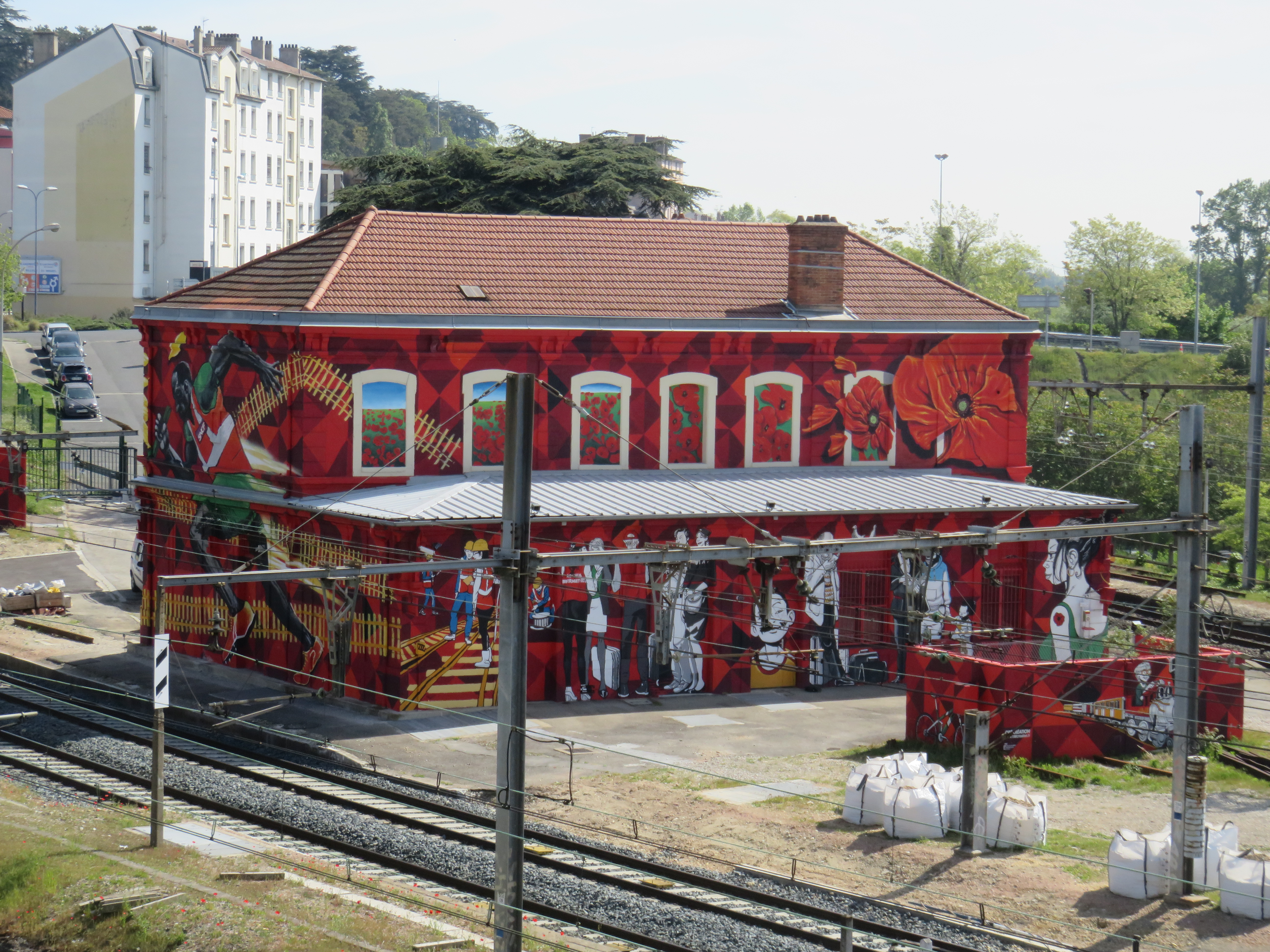
Former Lyon-Saint-Clair station

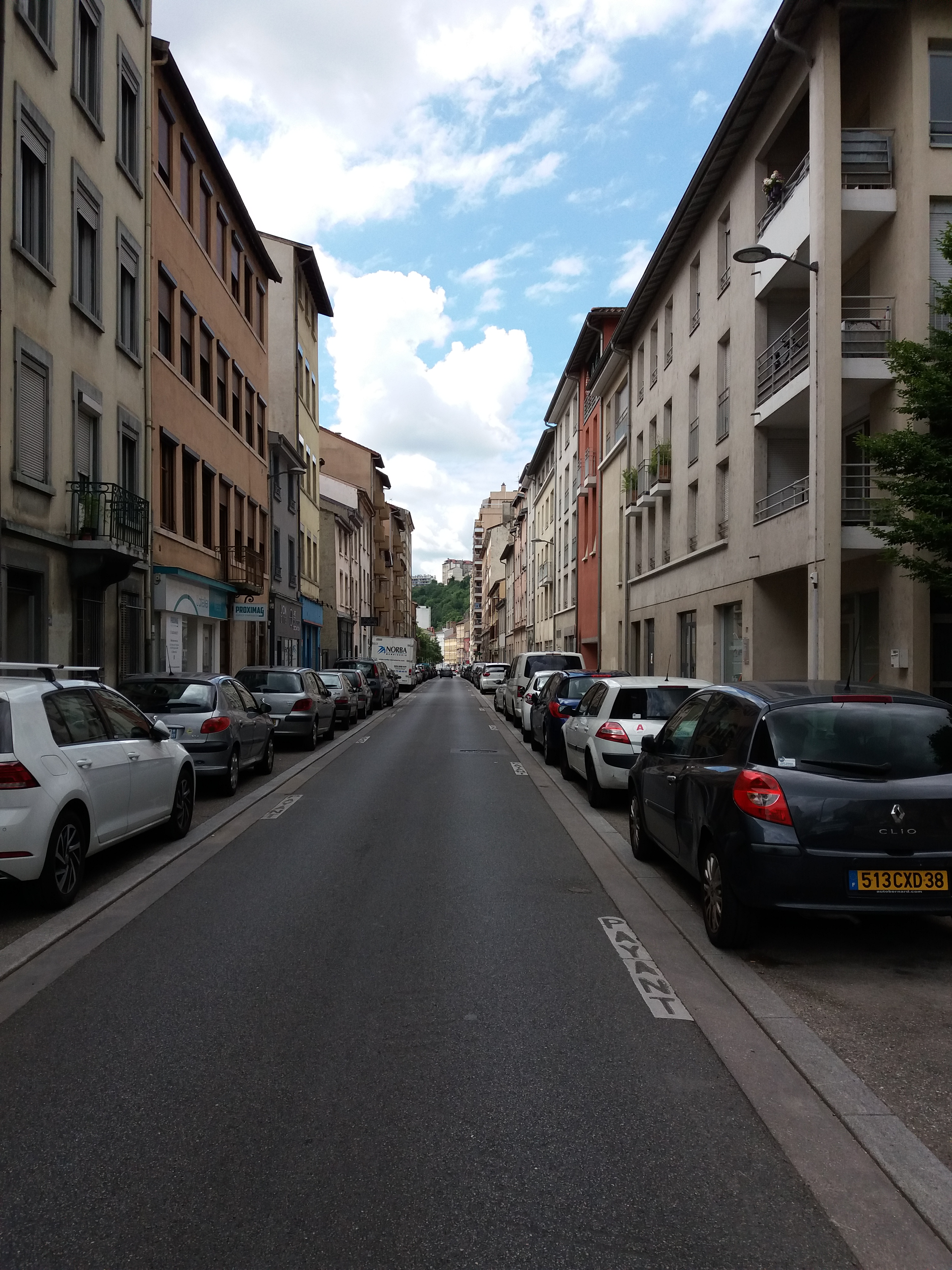
Grande Rue de Saint-Clair

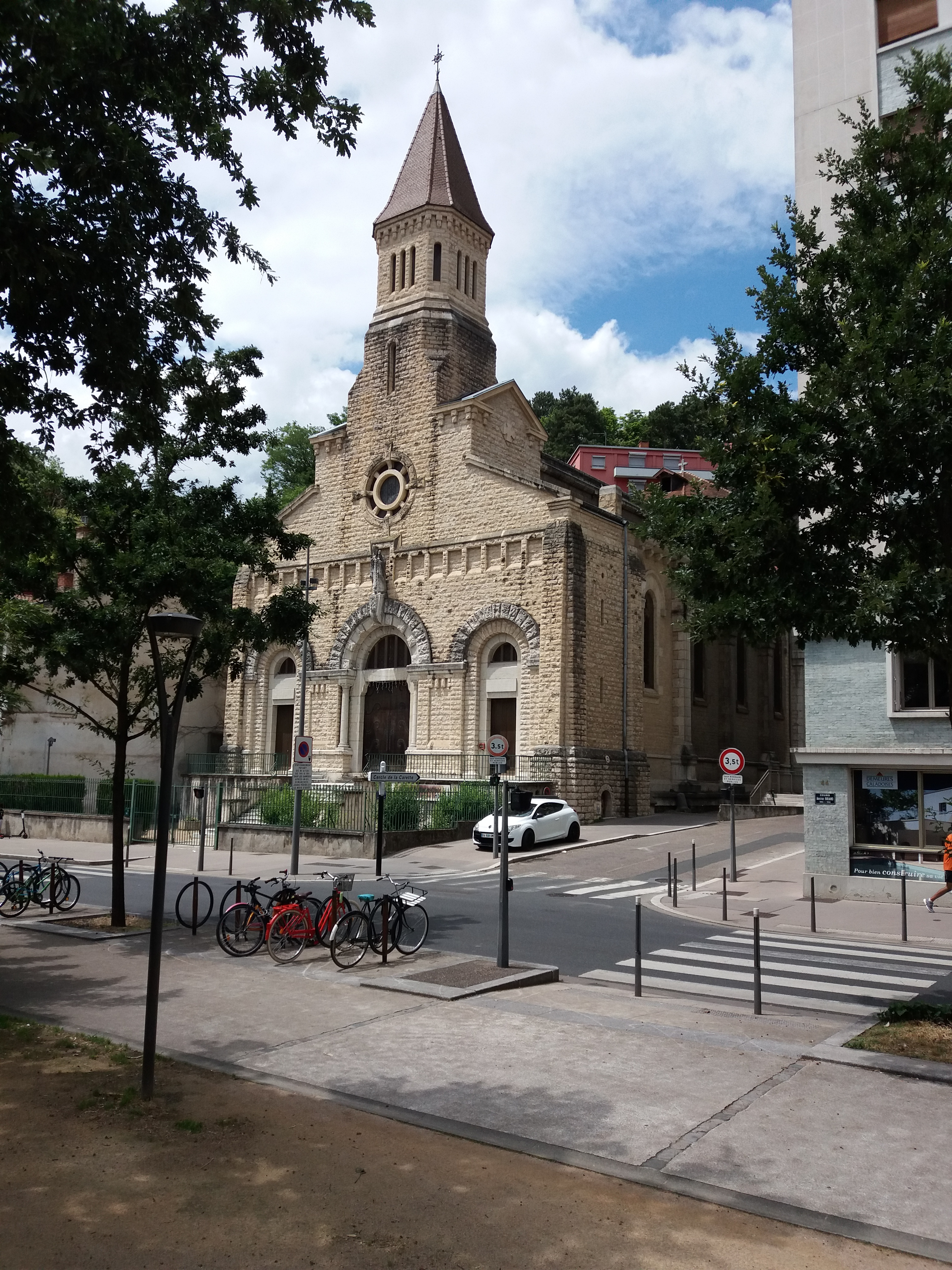
Church of Saint-Clair

== See also ==
Abbey of Saint-Pierre-les-Nonnains

=== Bibliography ===
- Basse, Martin; Basse, Jo (1976). Histoire de Caluire et Cuire: Commune du Lyonnais (in French). Lyon: Éditions FOT. p. 86.
- Bernot, Emmanuel; Cyrille, Cyrille; Dessaint, Philippe (2008). Rénovation lourde du tunnel de la Croix-Rousse 69001/69004 Lyon: Le réseau souterrain des "arêtes de poisson" (in French). Vol. 1/2. Service archéologique de la ville de Lyon.
- Chapot, Henri (February 24, 2014). "Saint-Clair, Lyon ou Caluire ?". Bulletin Municipal Officiel de la Ville de Lyon (in French) (6044): 2.
- Bobichon, Max; Montmessin, Yves (2011). En regardant le temps passer… à Lyon au xvie siècle: (d'après le plan scénographique de 1550) (in French). Lyon: Association Lyon - Cathédrale. pp. 164–169. ISBN 979-10-91077-00-2.
- Martin, Jean-Baptiste (1908–1909). Histoire des églises et chapelles de Lyon (in French). Vol. 2. Lyon: H. Lardanchet. pp. 210–211.
- Vingtrinier, Emmanuel; Drevet, Joannès (1901). Le Lyon de nos Pères: Dessins et eaux-fortes de J. Drevet (in French). Bernoux et Cumin. pp. 159–160.
- Blanc, Marius (1898). La vie et le culte de saint Clair: abbé de Saint-Marcel de Vienne (en Dauphiné) (in French). Vol. 2. Imprimerie J. Mazeyrie. pp. 40–50.
- Aynard, Théodore (1883). Histoire du quai Saint-Clair en la ville de Lyon: depuis son origine jusqu'à nos jours et de quelques autres choses (in French). Association typographique. pp. 34–35.
