= Louis Cretey =

French painter

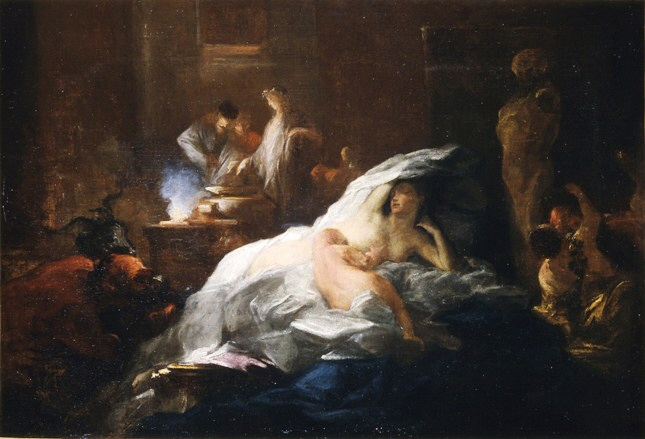
Scene from Antiquity

Louis Cretey, formerly known as Pierre-Louis Cretey (c.1635 – after 1702), was a French baroque painter and one of the leading masters in the Lyonnaise school.

== Life ==
Little is known about the early life of this artist. He was born in Lyon. Records place Cretey in Rome from 1661 to 1679, then Modena in 1679 – another place he probably worked was Parma. He then returned to France and spent most of his subsequent career in Lyon, gaining renown from the 1680s onwards as a history painter and for producing altarpieces like The Road to Emmaus (Lyon, Ste Blandine). He became Thomas Blanchet's main collaborator, working with him on many decorative schemes such as work at the Palais de Roanne (now Palais de Justice).

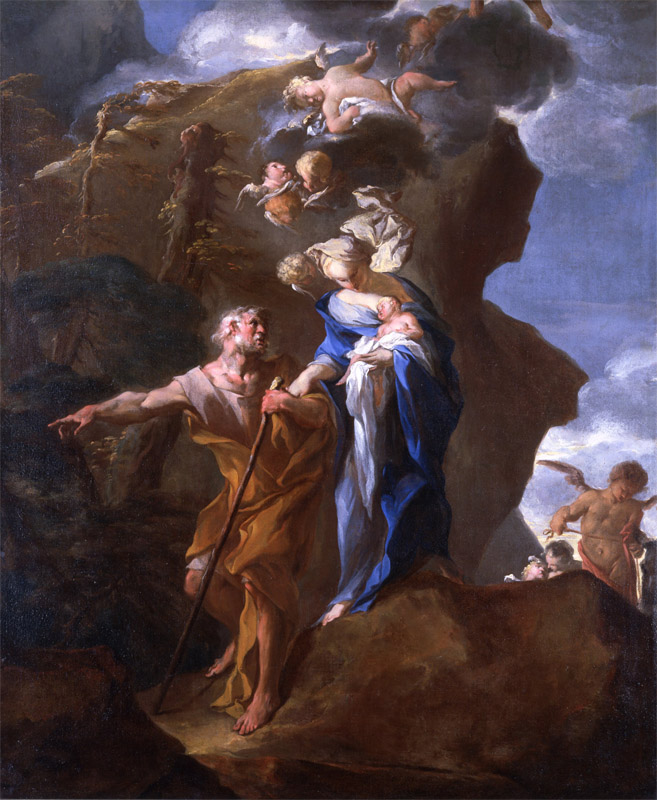
Flight into Egypt

From 1684 to 1686, Cretey created a series of paintings for the refectory of the Benedictine abbey of Saint-Pierre, including The Last Supper, The Multiplication of the Loaves, The Assumption of the Virgin, The Ascension of Christ and an The prophet Elias. These refectory paintings (now in the Musée des beaux-arts de Lyon) show groups of figures vividly lit in front of dark backgrounds, recalling not only 16th-century Venetian pre-baroque prototypes but also Simon Vouet's early Italian works and their chiaroscuro.

== Collections ==
The Musée des Beaux-Arts de Lyon holds a fine collection of this artist's works. Other museums displaying paintings by Cretey include the Musei Vaticani, the Musée du Louvre, the Detroit Institute of Art and the Musée des Beaux-Arts de Rennes.
