= Jean-Pierre-Louis de Luchet =

French journalist, essayist and theatre manager

Jean-Pierre-Louis de Luchet (1740–1792), also known as the Marquis de La Roche du Maine, or Marquis de Luchet, was a French journalist, essayist, and theatre manager.

== Life ==
Luchet held salons under the name of Marquis de La Roche, and was part of the Garde ordinaire du Roi, where he met André-Robert Andréa de Nerciat, who joined in 1771. Thereafter, he took the name of Jean-Pierre Luchet, Knight of St Louis. With Neciat he shone at the court of Frederick II. Neciat, attracted to the court of Hesse-Cassel by Luchet, who sought new parts for the Landgrave, towards the end of 1779 he proposed that Luchet did a comic opera, Constance ou l'heureuse témérité, which is preserved at the Stuttgart Library.

== Theories ==
In 1789, de Luchet published his Essai sur la Secte des Illuminés, in which he denounced the leaders of the Bavarian Illuminati, whom he accused of controlling Freemasonry, generally in Europe, and specifically in France.

== Works ==
- Analyse Raisonnée de la Sagesse de Charron [Reasoned Analysis of Charron's Wisdom]. 2 vols. (Amsterdam: Marc-Michel Rey, 1763).
- Considérations politiques et historiques sur l'établissement de la religion prétendue reformée en Angleterre [Political and Historical Considerations on the Establishment of the so-called Reformed Religion in England] (Paris: Chez Panckoucke, 1765). OCLC 221610756.
- Essais sur les principaux événemens de l'histoire de l'Europe cont. des considéraitons ... sur le régne d'Elisabeth, Reine d'Angleterre [Essays on the Principal Events in the History of Europe Cont. Considerations ... on the Reign of Elizabeth, Queen of England] (1766)
- Essais sur la minéralogie et la métallurgie [Essays on Mineralogy and Metallurgy] (Maestricht: Jean-Edme Dufour & Philippe Roux, 1779)
- Les Contemporains de 1789 et 1790, ou les opinions debattues pendant la premiere legislature avec les [The Contemporaries of 1789 and 1790, or the opinions debated during the first legislature with the main events of the Revolution]. 3 vols. (Paris: Chez Lejoy fils, 1790). OCLC 433467790. Part 1, Part 2, Part 3.
  - Re-issued in 1791 as New Historical Dictionary.
- Histoire de Messieurs Paris (1776)
- Mémoires de Mad, la baronne de St. Lys [Memoirs of Mad, the Baroness of St. Lys] (Chez la Sociététypographique, 1776). OCLC 43747539.
- Mémoires authentiques pour servir à l'histoire du Comte de Cagliostro [Authentic Memoirs to Serve the History of the Count of Cagliostro (François Fauche libr. à Hambourg, 1785)
- Mémoires de Madame la duchesse de Morsheim [Memoirs of Madame the Duchess of Morsheim] (De l'imprimerie de Wilson, 1786)
- Une seule faute, ou les mémoires d'une demoiselle de qualité [A Single Fault, or the Memoirs of a Young Lady of Quality]. 2 vols. (Paris, 1788). Part 1, Part 2.
- Essai sur la secte des Illuminés [Essay on the Sect of the Illuminati] (Paris, 1789) OCLC 886259372
- La Galerie des Etats-Généraux [The Gallery of the States-General,] with de Rivarol, Mirabeau, and PAF Choderlos de Laclos (Paris, 1989)
- La Galerie des dames François's, pour servir de suite à la galerie des états-généraux, par le même auteur. Troisième partie (1790)
- Paris en miniature d'après les dessins d'un nouvel argus [Paris in Miniature from the Drawings of a New Argus] (Chez Pichard, 1784)
- Le Vicomte de Barjac: ou mémoires pour servir à l'histoire de ce siècle [The Viscount of Barjac: or Memoirs to Serve the History of this Century] (De l'imprimerie de Wilson, et se trouve à Paris, chez les libraires qui vendent des nouveautés, 1784). OCLC 83277457.
