= Siméon-Guillaume de La Roque =

French Baroque poet (1551–1611)

Siméon-Guillaume de La Roque (1551 near Clermont-en-Beauvaisis – 1611) was a French Baroque poet.

Like Philippe Desportes, he attended Maréchale de Retz's salon. He was in the service of Henri d'Angoulême, bastard son of Henri II, then in that of the de Guise family. Ligueur with his protectors, La Roque returned to the court after the abjuration of Henri IV (1594).

The poetry of Siméon-Guillaume de La Roque combines the influence of Ronsard and Desportes, not without drawing directly from various Italian sources. It influenced François de Malherbe, whose author was a friend. By choosing his themes and rhythms, his work is thus at the crossroads of all poetic destinies.

== Selected works ==
- Les Premières Œuvres de S.-G. de La Roque (1590)
- Amours de Caritée (1595)
- Continuation de l'Angélique d'Arioste (1595)
- Les Heureuses amours de Cloridan (1596)
- Diverses poésies (1597) Read online
- Hymne sur l'embarquement de la Royne et de son arrivée en France (1600)
- Les Œuvres du sieur de La Roque (1609)
- La Chaste bergère, pastorale (1629) Read online
