= Pierre Louis Jean Ivolas =

French naturalist (1842–1908)

Pierre Louis Jean Ivolas (7 April 1842, in Sète – 29 June 1908, in Tours) was a French naturalist.

A professor at the Lycée Descartes in Tours, he is remembered for geological studies of central France and botanical investigations of Indre-et-Loire. He was a good friend of the botanist Ernest Henry Tourlet — Ivolas took over the completion of Catalogue raisonné des plantes vasculaires du département d'Indre-et-Loire following the death of Tourlet in 1907.

In 1879, he became a member of the Société Botanique de France. His herbarium is kept at the Herbarium of Montpellier University.

== Publications ==
- Contribution à l'étude paléontologique des faluns de la Touraine, 1900 (with A. Peyrot) – Contribution to the paleontological study of the faluns of Touraine.
- Les jardins alpins; description, ressources, etc., de ceux actuellement connus en Europe, 1908 – Alpine gardens; description, resources, etc., of those currently known in Europe.
