= Thomas Blanchet =

French painter (1614–1689)

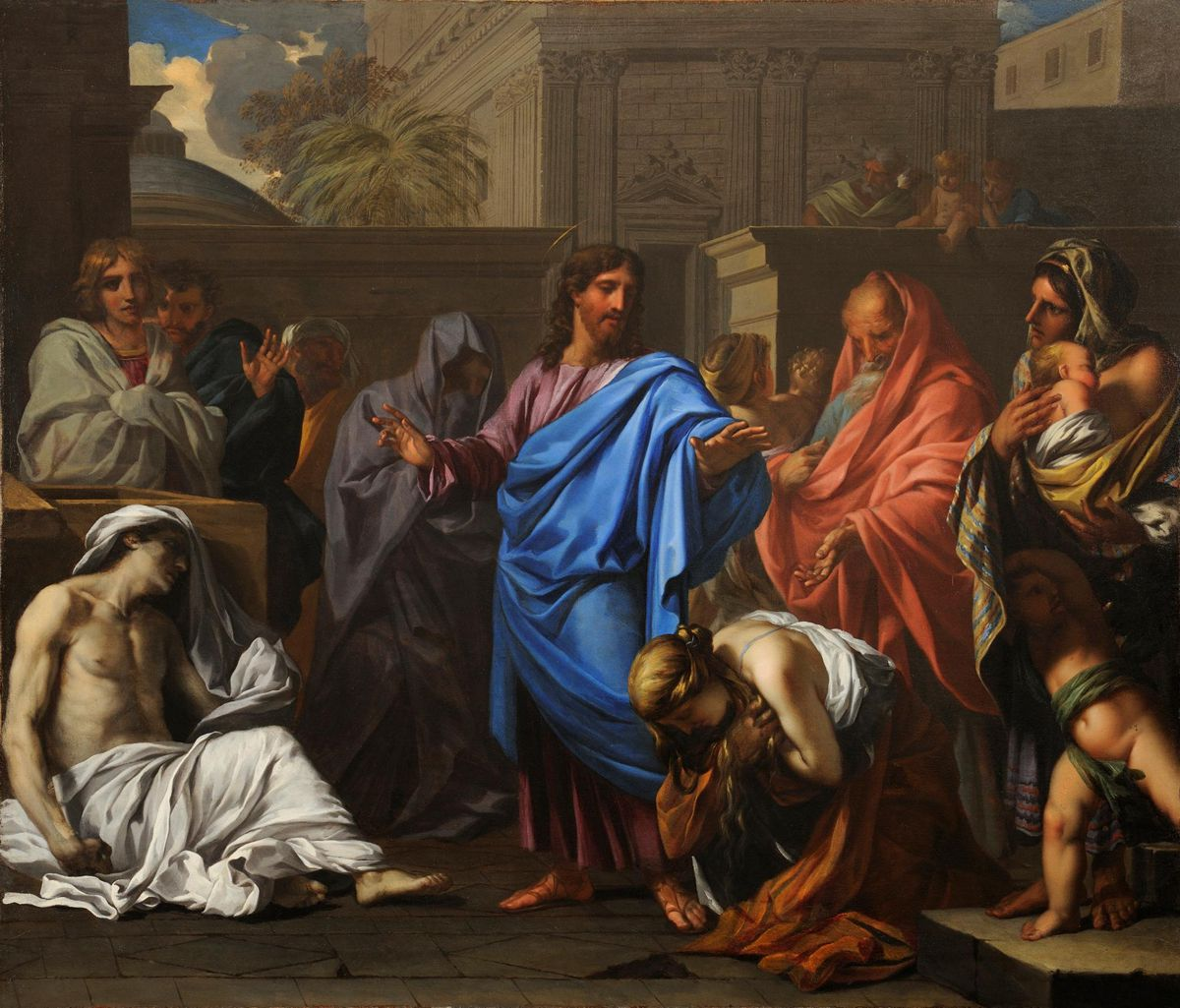
The Resurrection of Lazarus

Thomas Blanchet (French pronunciation: [tɔma blɑ̃ʃɛ]; 1614 – 21 June 1689) was a French painter, draughtsman, architect, sculptor and printmaker.

== Life ==
Blanchet is thought to have been born in Paris. During his training there, Blanchet met Jacques Sarazin, and on his advice moved from studying sculpture to painting. During this time he familiarised himself with the Baroque and the School of Fontainebleau's Mannerism, new imports into Paris at this time. Among his probably co-students was Simon Vouet. He stayed in Rome from c.1645 to 1653 and worked with artists in Nicolas Poussin's circle, as well as visiting the studios of Andrea Sacchi and Pietro da Cortona. He was highly praised by Gianlorenzo Bernini, who he also visited. Blanchet produced paintings for Niccolo Guido di Bagno (1584–1663), made engravings of ancient tombs and views or prospettive and a mausoleum for Rene de Voyer d'Argenson, French ambassador to Venice in San Giobbe, Venice (1654). He died in Lyon.

== Sources ==
- Art Encyclopaedia
