= La Petite Niçoise =

Painting by Berthe Morisot

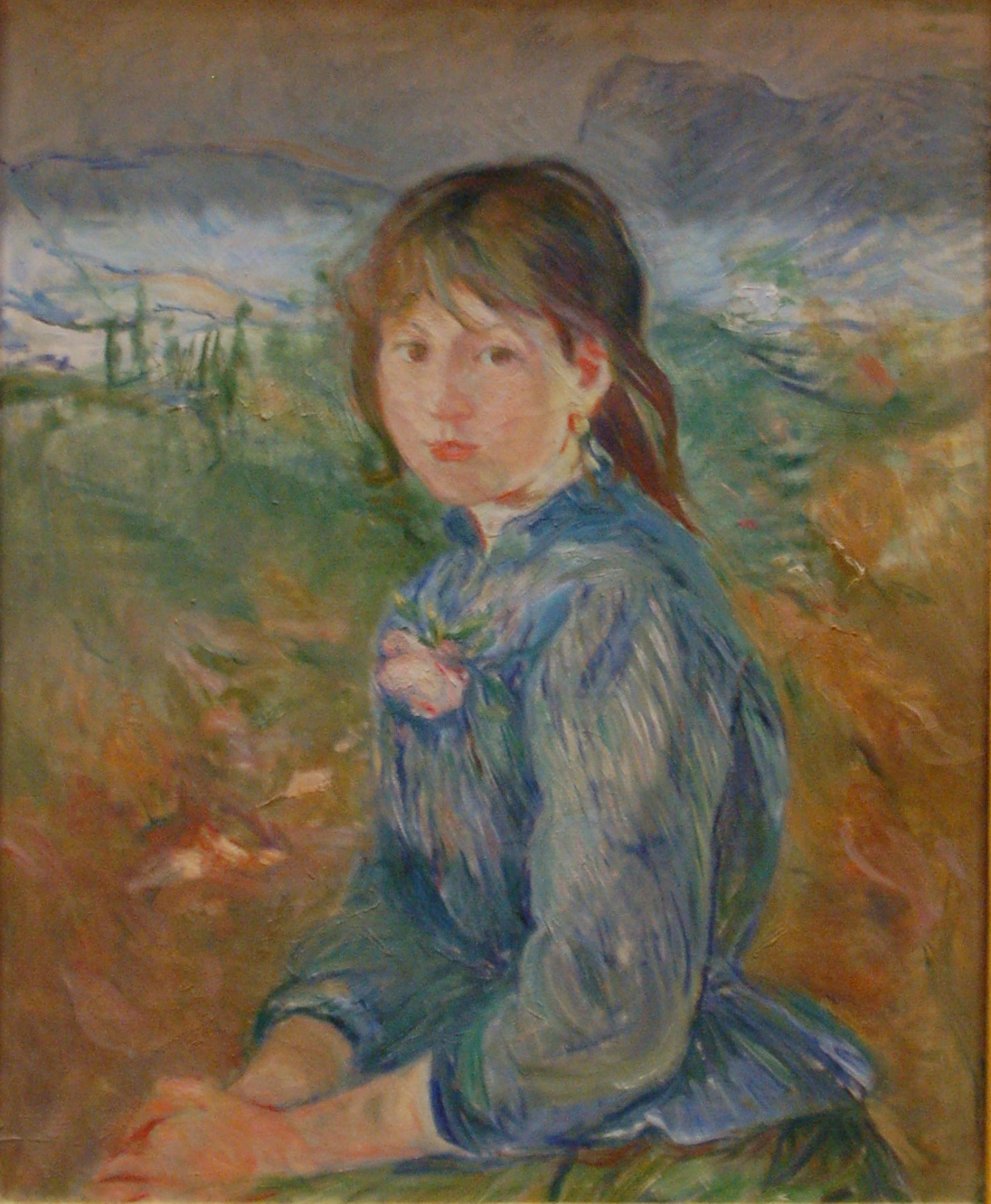
- Artist: Berthe Morisot
- Year: 1889
- Medium: Oil on canvas
- Dimensions: 64 cm × 52 cm (25 in × 20 in)
- Location: Musée des Beaux-Arts de Lyon, Lyon

La Petite Niçoise (The Small Girl from Nice) is an oil-on-canvas painting by the French Impressionist artist Berthe Morisot, executed in 1889. It has been in the collection of the Musée des Beaux-Arts de Lyon since 1907.

== Description ==
The painting shows a young girl presented at the waist, seated and turned three-quarters. She stares at the viewer with her brown eyes, her hands resting one on the other at the level of her knees. With her long brown hair in the wind, she wears a discreet earring in her left ear (the only one visible), lipstick, a dark blue top decorated with a rose in the buttonhole and a green-hued skirt. Behind her unfolds a barely sketched mountainous landscape, with a few sketchy forms of trees being recognizable on the left.
