= Color in Informatics and Media Technology =

Master's degree programme

CIMET Logo

== What is CIMET? ==
Color in Informatics and Media Technology is a European Commission funded two-year Erasmus Mundus master's degree programme offered since 2008 by a consortium of universities, including the University of Granada, Spain, the Jean Monnet University, France, the University of Joensuu, Finland, and the Gjøvik University College, Norway. The focus of this Erasmus Mundus programme lies in the innovative research and course work via trans-European mobility schemes.

== The master course ==
The CIMET Master programme covers a wide range of areas such as color, photonics, computer vision and imaging science, computer science and multimedia technology. The programme objective is to educate students in advanced methodologies and models in computational color science. CIMET offers three areas of specialization: color imaging science, spectral color science and multimedia technology.

== Mobility ==
Mobility is inherent to the CIMET programme; from northern to southern Europe, students approach varied studying, working and living environments challenging their adaptation, organizational and language skills.

== Language policy ==
English is the official language of instruction and examination for CIMET. However, students are strongly recommended to take some mandatory host country language courses during their studies.

== Associated laboratories ==
1. The Norwegian Color Research Laboratory
2. Color Imaging laboratory-At University of Granada Spain
3. InFotonics Center at Joensuu
4. Hubert Curien Laboratory at University of Jean Monnet.

== Industrial Collaboration ==
The master program has collaborations with industry mainly via summer internship and masters thesis positions.
