= Joseph-Hugues Fabisch =

French sculptor (1812–1886)

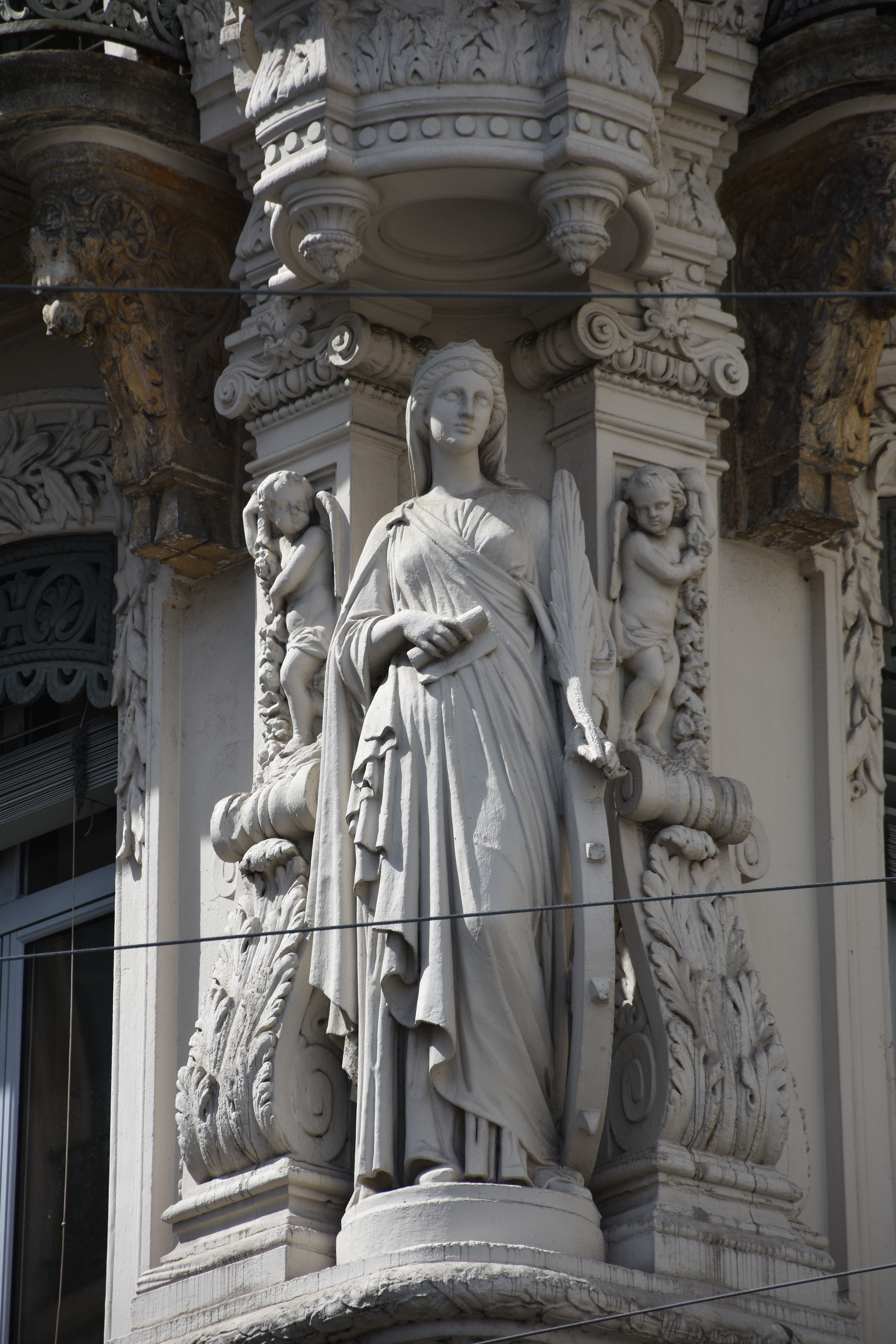
Sainte Catherine (1866), at the angle of rue Sainte-Marie-des-Terreaux and rue d'Algérie, Lyon

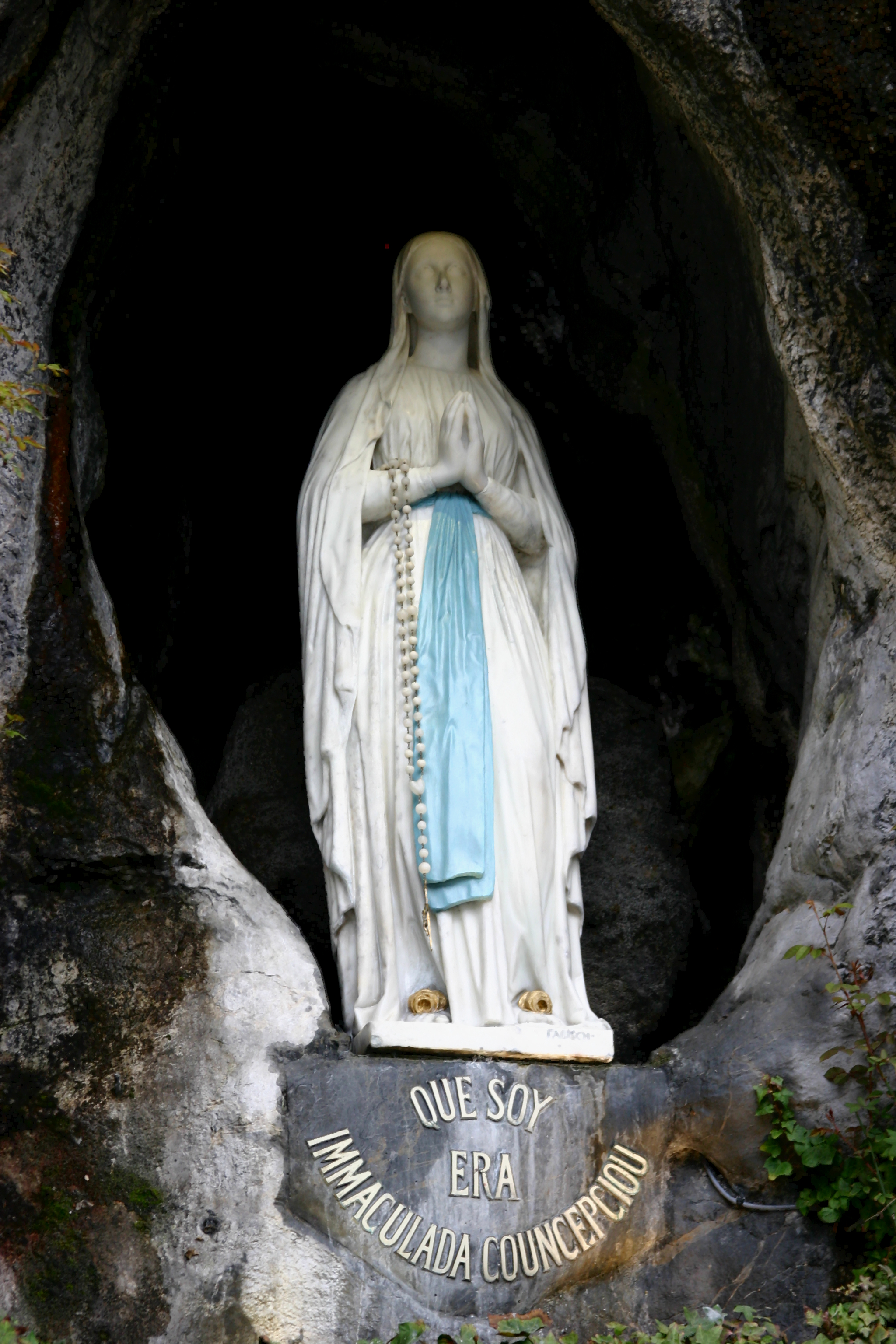
The Virgin of Lourdes, the most famous work of Fabisch

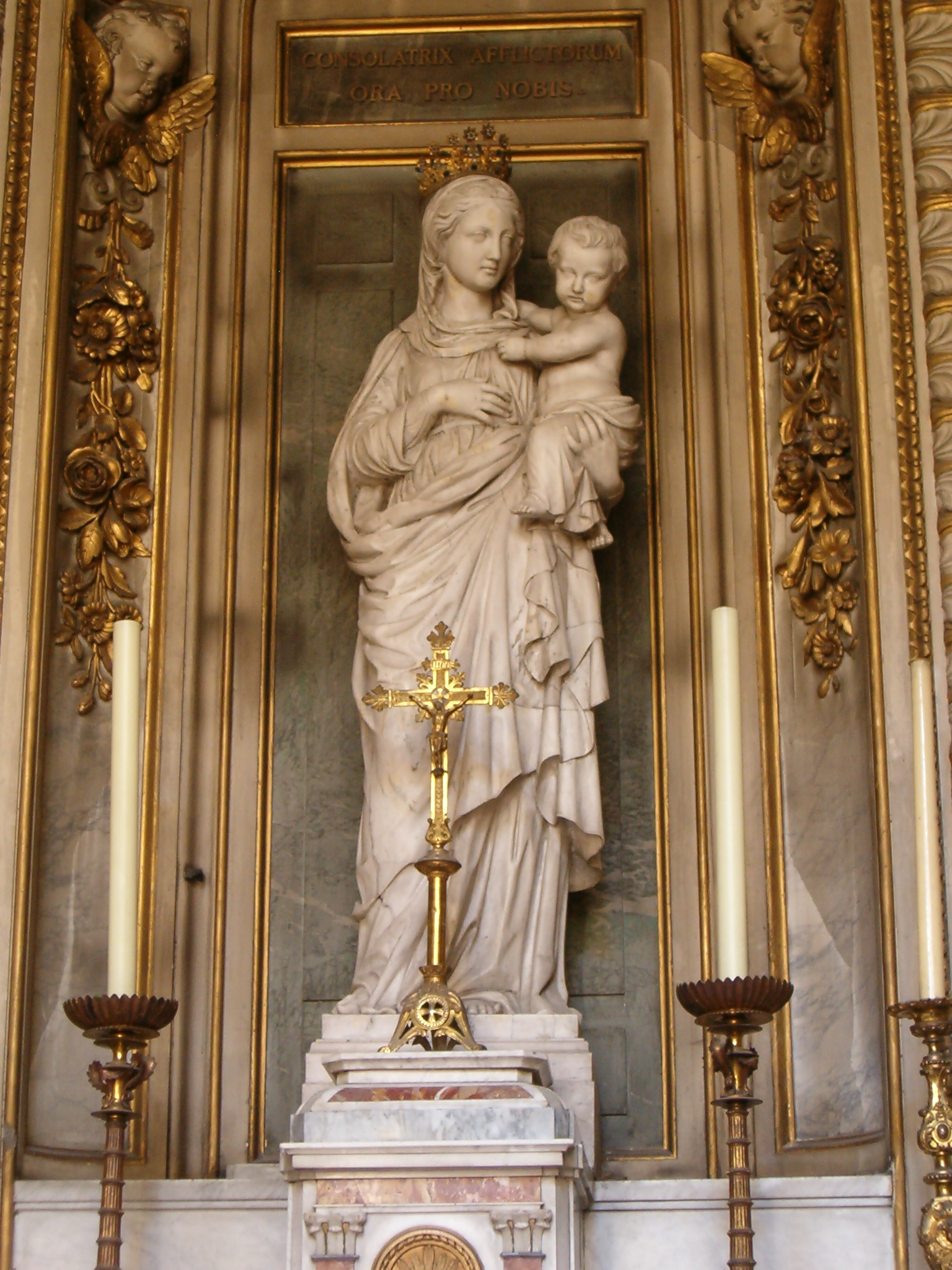
The Virgin of the Carthusians, Church of Saint-Bruno des Chartreux, Lyon

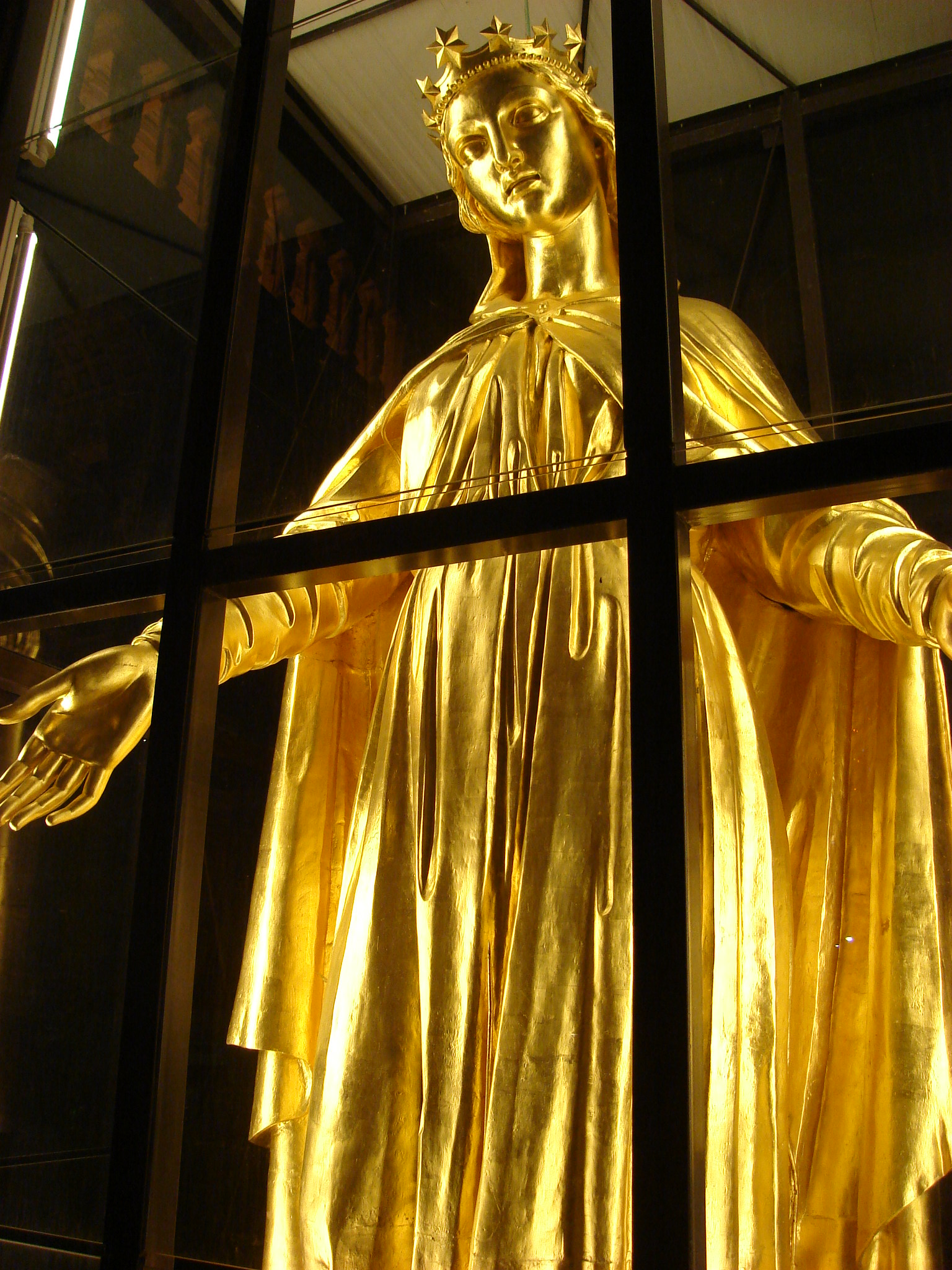
The Virgin of Fourvière, Basilica of Notre-Dame de Fourvière, Lyon

Joseph-Hugues Fabisch (born Aix-en-Provence, 1812; died Lyon, 1886) was a French sculptor. He was professor at the École des Beaux-Arts de Lyon, and official sculptor to the diocese of Lyon.

== Life ==
In 1840, he set himself up at Saint-Étienne, where he was professor at the town's university. He left the town for Lyon in 1845 where he became a professor at the École des Beaux-Arts de Lyon, becoming its director in 1874 and teaching artists including Léon-Alexandre Delhomme. In 1852 he produced the Virgin on top of the chapel of the Basilica of Notre-Dame de Fourvière in his studio on the quays of the Saône. When his studio was flooded, the statue's unveiling was put back to 8 December, which has since then been celebrated as Lyon's fête des lumières.

From 15 to 19 September 1863, he was in Lourdes to visit Bernadette Soubirous, who described to him the visions of the Virgin Mary. He then made a statue of the Virgin, commissioned by the Lacour sisters and under the control of Abbot Blanc, who above all wanted a statue faithful to the young woman's description. It was intended for the grotto of Massabielle near Lourdes and dedicated on 4 April 1864 in front of 20,000 people. This was the artist's masterwork, copied later on all over the world, but caused a polemic on its adequacy to the young peasant girl's visions, who did not approve it.

In 1868, Fabisch created another Madonna, this one with the Child, for the crypt of the Basilica of the Immaculate Conception in Lourdes.

== Works ==
- 1852 : Golden virgin consecrated on 8 December 1852 (see Fête des lumières) on top of the chapel of the Basilica of Notre-Dame de Fourvière in Lyon 5th arrondissement.
- 1852 : apsidal altar of Saint Benedict, Basilica of Saint-Martin d'Ainay, Lyon 2nd arrondissement.
- 1855 : Virgin and Child, on the corner of Maison Blanchon by the architect Pierre Bossan, at the corner of Quai Fulchiron and Place Benoît-Crépu, Lyon 5th arrondissement
- 1855 : Beatrix, white marble, Musée des Beaux-Arts de Lyon, Lyon 1st arrondissement
- 1860 : tympanum of the porch of the Basilica of Saint-Martin d'Ainay, Lyon 2nd arrondissement.
- 1864 : Virgin Mary, according to the description of Bernadette Soubirous, grotto Massabielle, Lourdes; Carrara marble, 1.83m high.
- 1866 : Saint Catherine of Alexandria, place des Terreaux, corner of rue d’Algérie and rue Sainte Marie des Terreaux, Lyon 1st arrondissement. J. H. Fabisch also designed the building's pediment, one of whose corners the statue occupies
- 1868 : Virgin and Child, Basilica of the Immaculate Conception, Lourdes.

Undated :

- Saint Peter, place des Terraux, corner of rue Constantine, rue Paul Chenavard, Lyon 1st arrondissement
- Saint Joseph, chapel of Saint Joseph, Basilica of Saint-Martin d'Ainay, Lyon 2nd arrondissement.
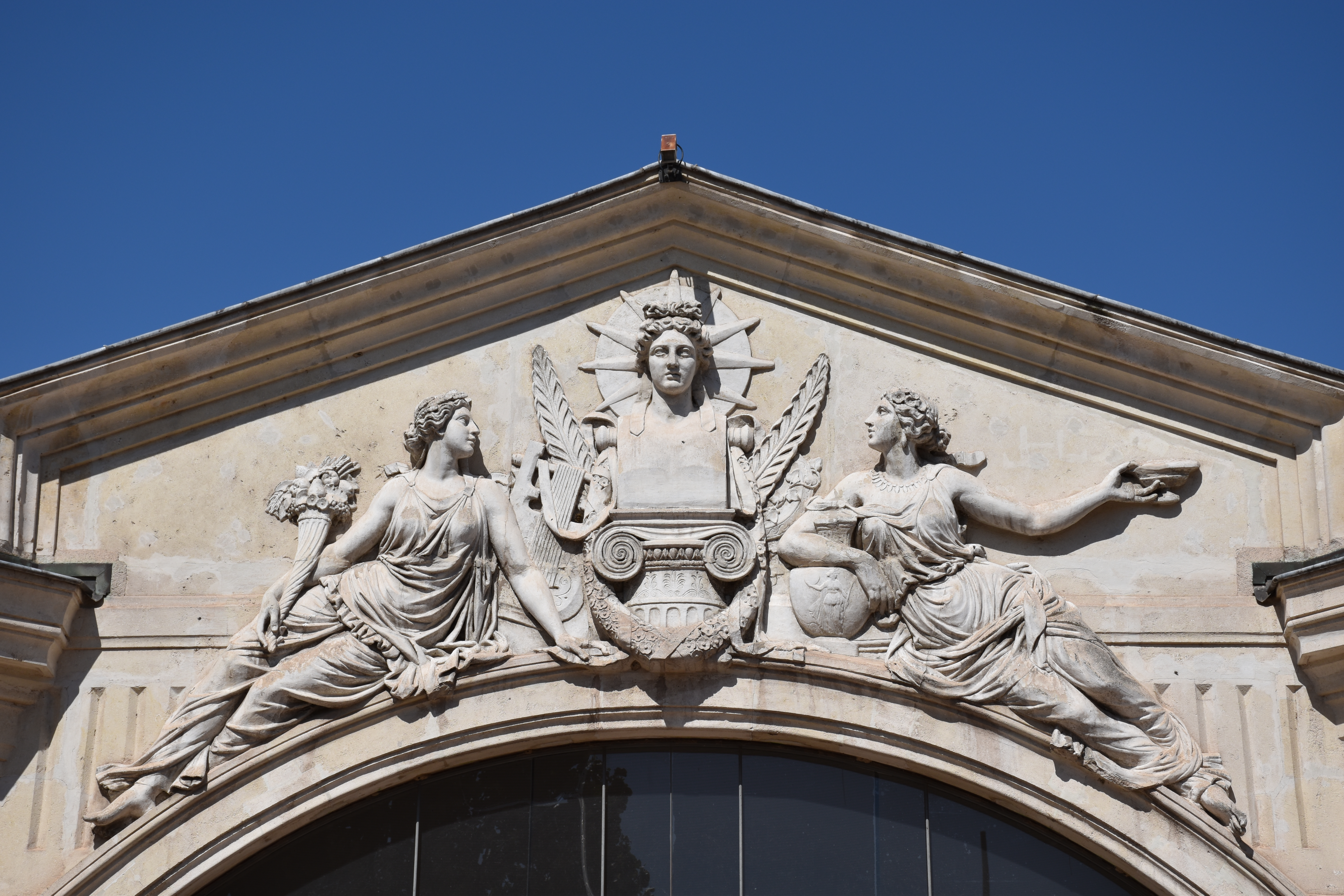
Pediment with the bust of Apollo (1854), West Pavillion, Place Bellecour, Lyon
