= Dancers Onstage =

Painting by Edgar Degas

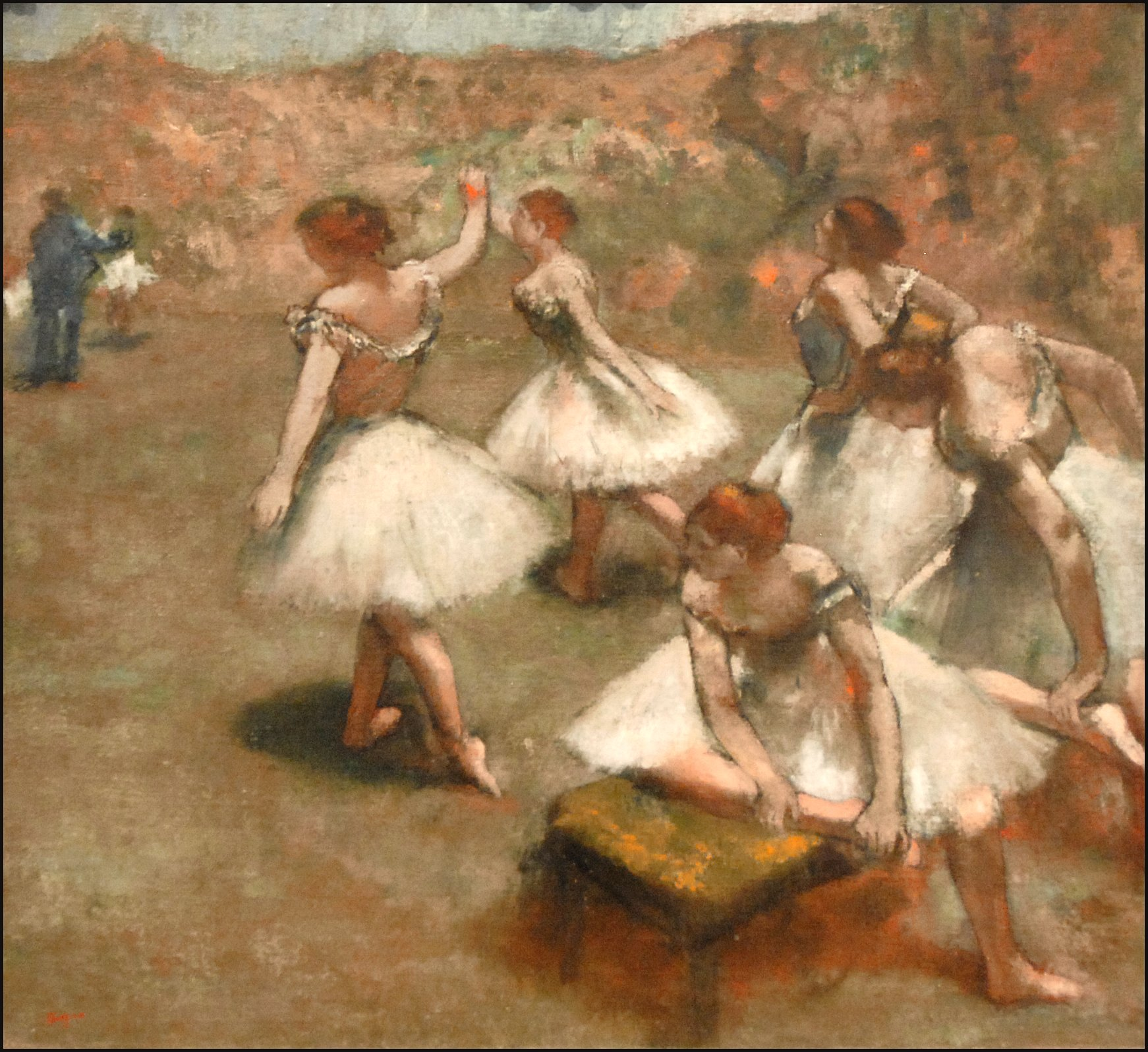
- Artist: Edgar Degas
- Year: 1889
- Medium: Oil on canvas
- Dimensions: 76 cm × 82 cm (30 in × 32 in)
- Location: Musée des Beaux-Arts de Lyon, Lyon

Dancers Onstage (French: Danseuses sur la scène) is an oil on canvas painting by French artist Edgar Degas, from 1889. It is held in the Musée des Beaux-Arts de Lyon.

== Theme ==
Degas is the painter of dancers because of the large number of works he devoted to this subject during the period 1860–1890.

The influence of the Japanese prints by Hokusai and Utamaro allowed Degas, in a phenomenon linked as a whole to the impressionist movement, to free one of the last barriers of academic painting, the vision of the object.

The liberated observation, the representation of the movement of the ballets allowed Degas to grasp everything that was unexpected in the fleeting aspect of this world.

The painter seeks to render the most diverse forms and attitudes, under the effect of light and movement, with complete objectivity; the theme will multiply and the rehearsals prior to the ballet became its field of investigation, like a landscape.

It is indeed the world behind the scenes, depicting rehearsals and training: this painting does not depict the codified movements of classical dance or show performances. Degas instead seeks, in a naturalistic approach, to highlight the stubbornness that drives ballet dancers.

Degas, who was perfectly in tune with Impressionism in his early days, nevertheless distinguished himself from it by the personal and particular vision that he had on artificial lighting and the movement of the ballerinas' bodies.
