= Cimet =

Cimet or CIMET may refer to:

- Mount Cimet, a mountain in Alpes-de-Haute-Provence, France
- Color in Informatics and Media Technology, a multimedia master's degree
