= Democritus Meditating on the Seat of the Soul =

Statue by Léon-Alexandre Delhomme

Coordinates: 45°46′0.7″N 4°50′1.2″E

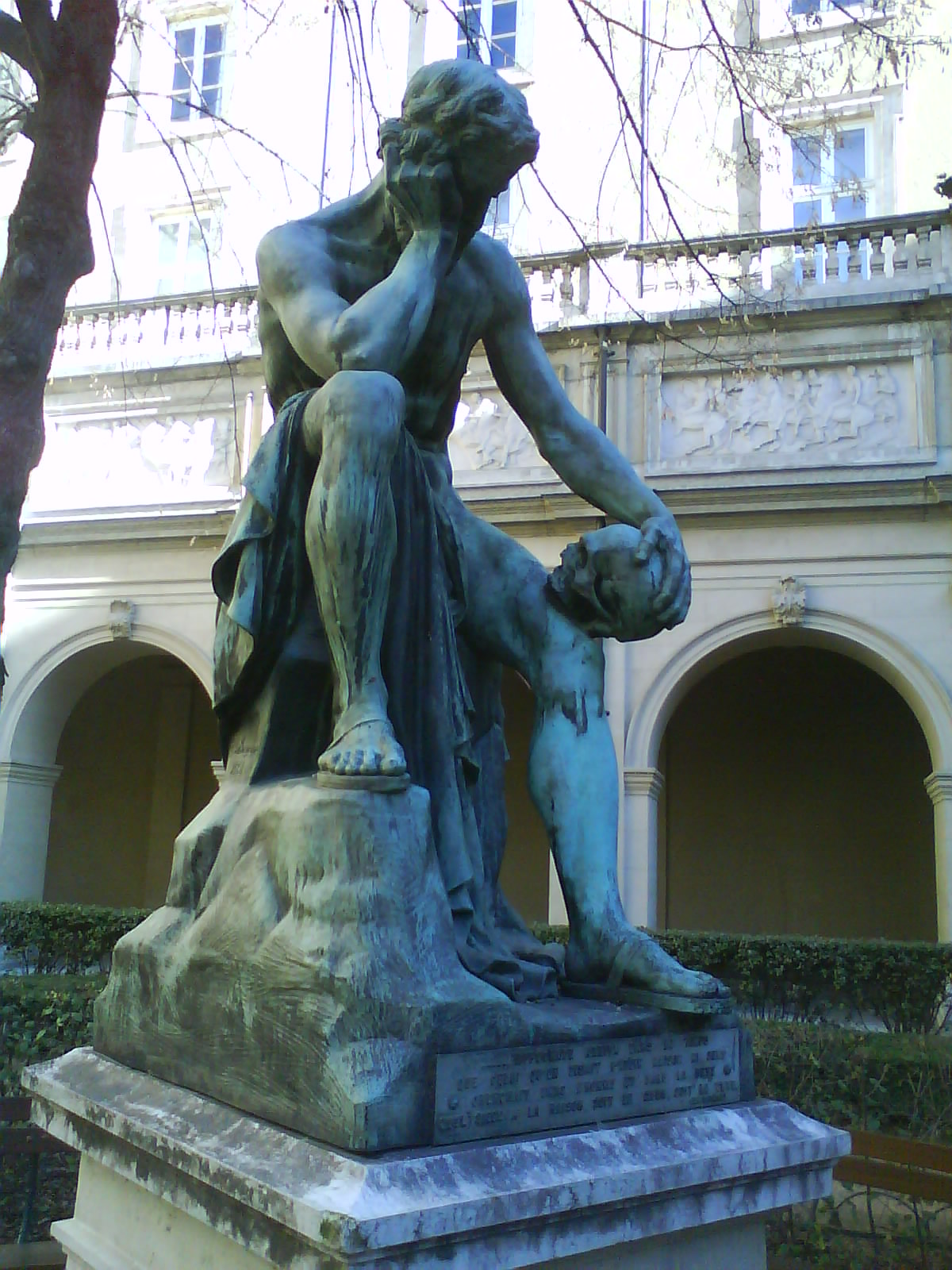
Democritus Meditating on the Seat of the Soul, by Léon-Alexandre Delhomme, 1868

Democritus Meditating on the Seat of the Soul (Démocrite méditant sur le siège de l'âme) is a statue by Léon-Alexandre Delhomme (1841–1895), exhibited at the Paris Salon of 1868. It shows the Greek philosopher Democritus, his eyes fixed on a skull he holds in his hands. It is now exhibited in the garden of the Musée des Beaux-Arts de Lyon.

On its base is inscribed an extract from the 29th fable of La Fontaine:

"Hippocrates in time arrived at the conclusion that he had not sought whether the heart or the head was the seat of either reason or sense in man and beast".
