= Madame Guimard's furniture =

Set of Art Nouveau bedroom furniture

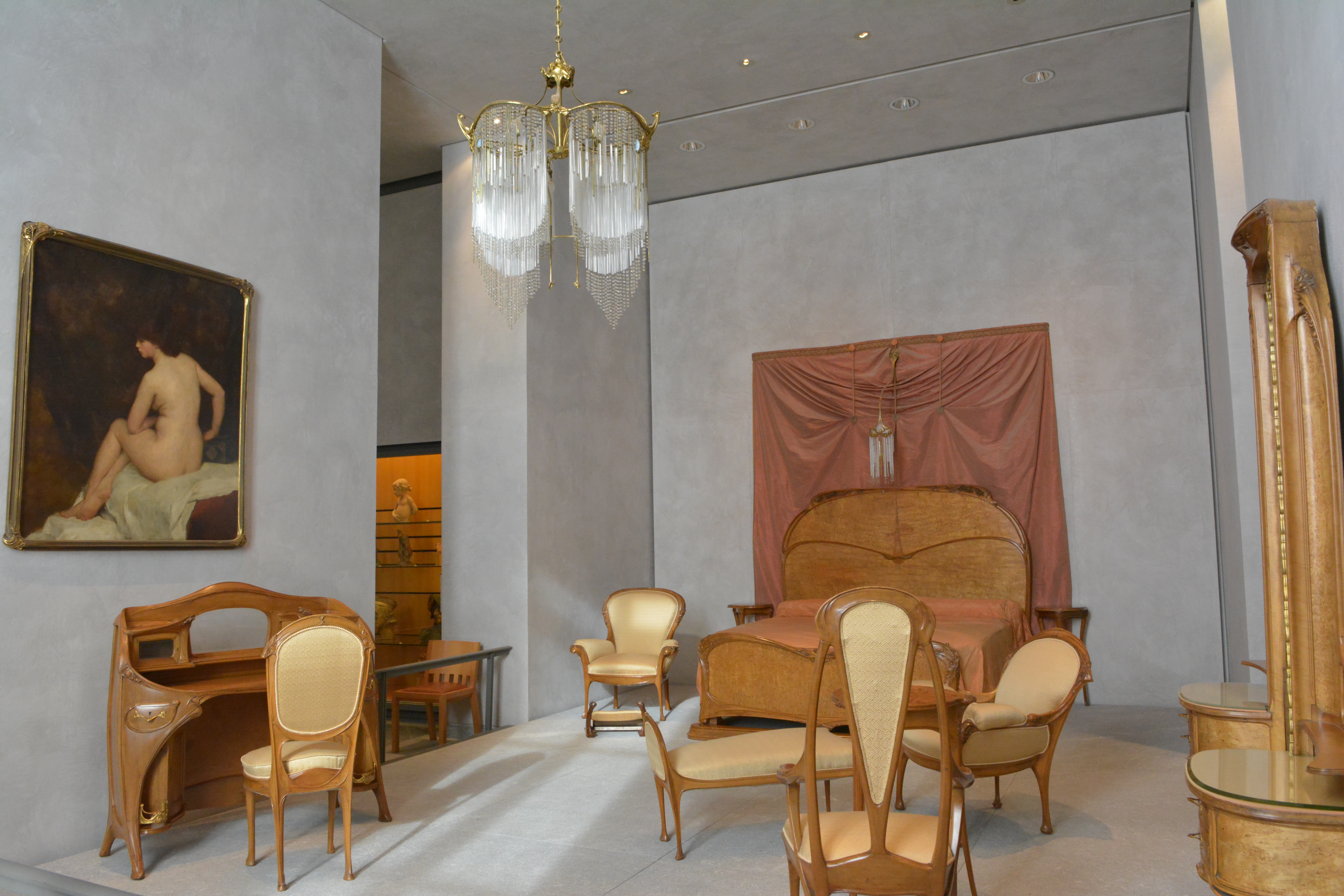
The furniture on display

Madame Guimard's furniture is a set of Art Nouveau bedroom furniture, designed from 1909 onwards by the Lyon-born architect Hector Guimard for his new wife, the American artist Adeline Oppenheim. They married in 1909, and the same year he bought a site at 122 Avenue Mozart in the 16th arrondissement of Paris to build a three-storey hôtel particulier, or mansion. When the site was sold in 1948, Madame Guimard gave the bedroom furniture to the Musée des Beaux-Arts de Lyon, the desk to the musée de l'École de Nancy and the dining room furniture to the Petit Palais.

== Sources ==
- http://www.mba-lyon.fr/mba/sections/fr/collections-musee/chefs-oeuvre/oeuvres1476/chambre_de_mme_guima
