= Léon-Alexandre Delhomme =

French sculptor in 19th century

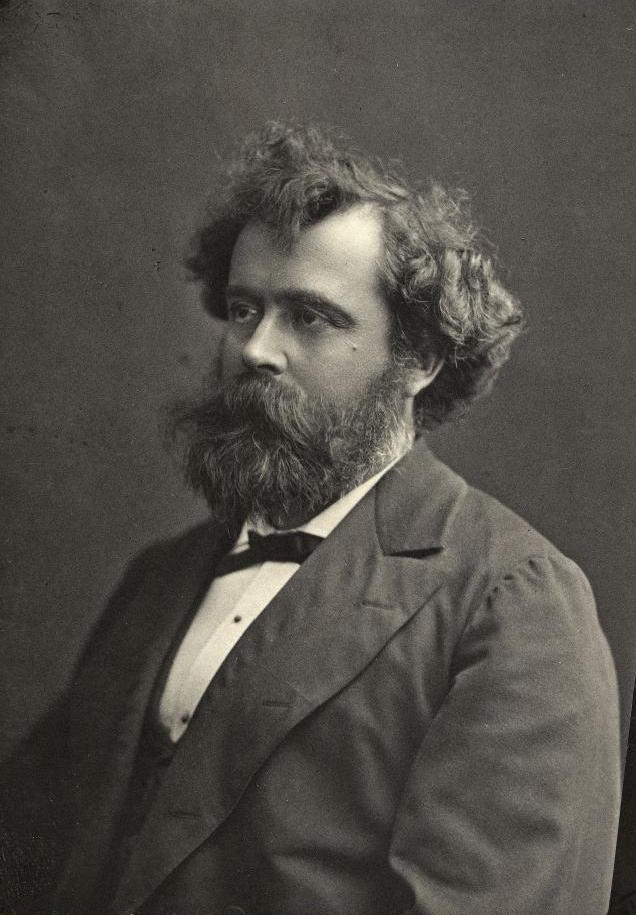
- Born: 20 July 1841; Tournon-sur-Rhône
- Died: 16 March 1895 (aged 53); Paris

Léon-Alexandre Delhomme (20 July 1841, in Tournon-sur-Rhône, Ardèche – 1895 or 1893, in Paris) was a French sculptor. He is immortalised by a statue in the cimetière du Montparnasse in Paris.

== Life ==
He studied at the École des Beaux-Arts, in the studio of Augustin Dumont (1801–1884) and of Joseph-Hugues Fabisch.

In 1867, he was elected to the municipal council of Paris.

== Works ==
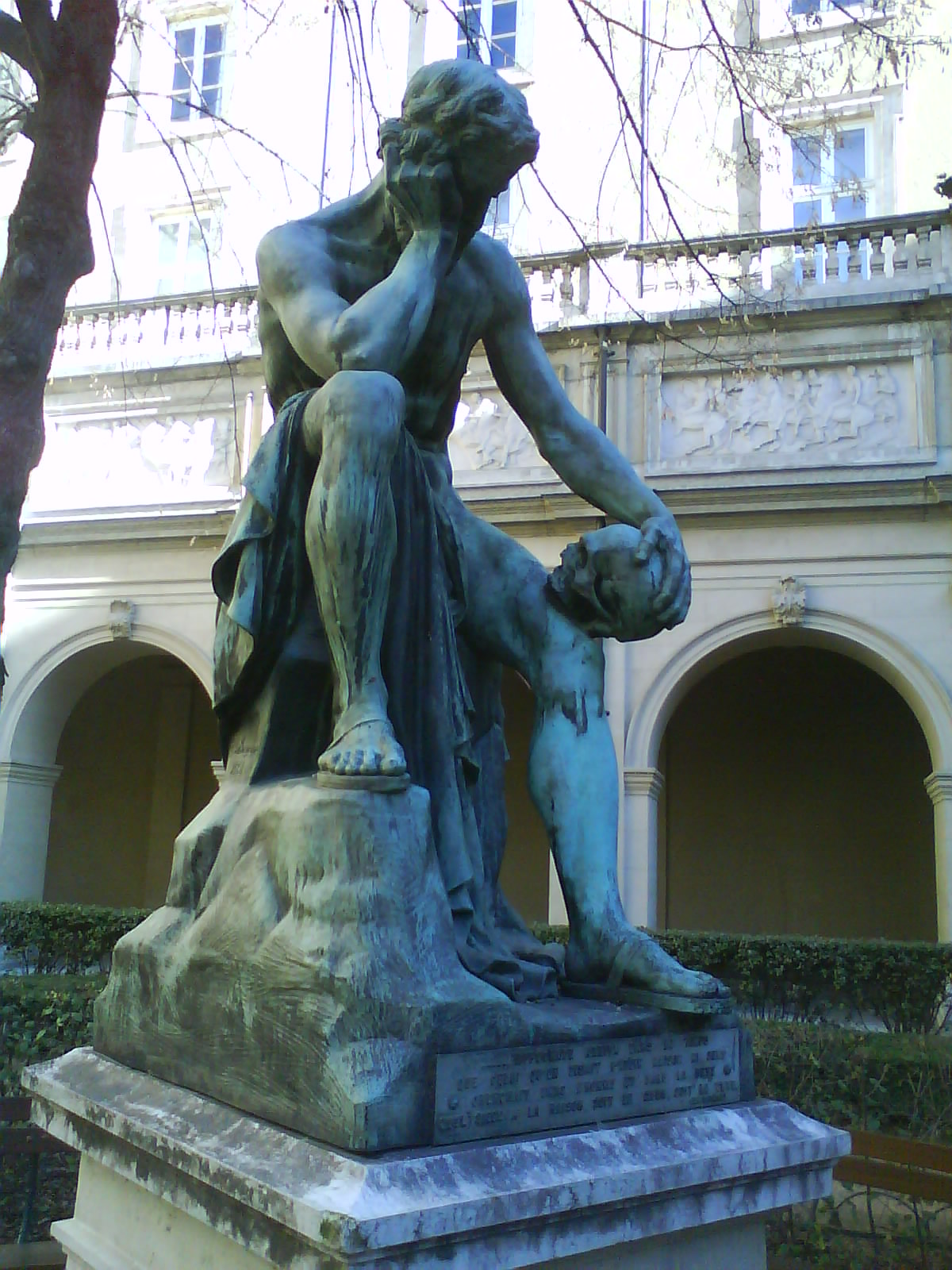
Democrites meditating on the seat of the soul, garden of the musée des Beaux-Arts de Lyon.

- Statue of the Republic, in the main amphitheatre of the Sorbonne (1889). She is shown as a wise woman between an urn and a lion "removing the veil of ignorance from a young Frenchman", in one of the university's least neutral sculptures (commissioned by Soitoux).
- Statue of Louis Blanc (1811–1882) in bronze, melted down during World War Two, located on Place Monge (Paris, 5th arrondissement)
- Above the entrance to the Bazar de l'Hôtel de Ville - Paris (4th arr.)
- Bust of the French doctor Stanislas Laugier (1799–1872)
- Statue Defiance known as The Gaul
- Démocrite méditant sur le siège de l'âme.
- Standing warrior (Gaul)
- Medal of Jean-Charles Adolphe Alphand
- Cast iron

- Vercingetorix,
- Wounded Gaul,
- Joan of Arc.
