= University of Djibouti =

Public university in Djibouti

Coordinates: 11.5380°N 43.117°E

- Université de Djibouti جامعة جيبوتي
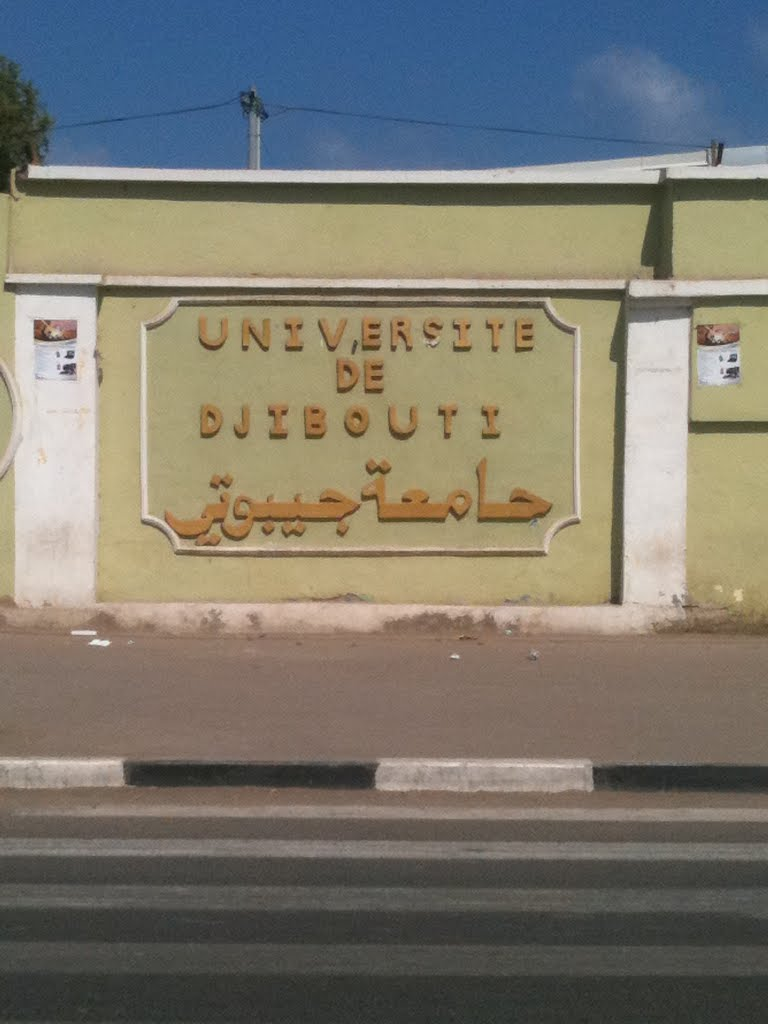
- Type: Public
- Established: 2006; 20 years ago
- President: Dr. Djama Mohamed Hassan
- Location: Djibouti, Djibouti
- Website: Official website

The University of Djibouti is a public university in Djibouti City, the capital of Djibouti.

== History ==
The University of Djibouti was established on 7 January 2006 by Decree. It grew out of the University Centre of Djibouti.

In 2008, the university had 2,500 students. The student body reaches more than 7000 in 2015.

== Components ==
The University of Djibouti has five faculties and two institutes.

== Faculties ==
- Faculty of Law, Economics and Management (FDEG)
- Faculty of Science (FS)
- Faculty of Humanities, Languages and Social Sciences (FLLSH)
- Faculty of Medicine
- Faculty of Engineering

== Institutes ==
- Technical Institute of Industry (IUT-I)
- Technical Institute of Tertiary Services

== Notable faculty ==
- Dr Abdou Idris Omar, a researcher and Bioclimate lecturer at the university
- Souad Kassim Mohamed (born 1976), Linguist and Senior Lecturer in linguistics and French
- Hassan Rayaleh, Research Valorisation Senior Program manager at the university

== Notable alumni ==
- Ayanleh Souleiman
