= Souad Kassim Mohamed =

Djiboutian linguist (born 1976)

- Born: 30 November 1976 (age 49); Djibouti
- Occupations: linguist, scholar and playwright

Academic background
- Education: Jean Monnet University, University of Burgundy and Institut National des Langues et Civilisations Orientales

Academic work
- Discipline: Linguistics
- Sub-discipline: French didactics
- Institutions: University of Djibouti
- Notable works: Un enfant a tout prix (A Child at Any Price), play
- Website: https://souad-kassim-mohamed.blog4ever.com/

Souad Kassim Mohamed (Arabic: سعاد قاسم محمد, romanized: Suʻād Qāsim Muḥammad; born 30 November 1976) is a Djiboutian linguist, scholar and playwright.

== Biography ==
Mohamed was born in 1976. She studied in France at Jean Monnet University in Saint-Etienne, the University of Burgundy in Dijon, and the Institut National des Langues et Civilisations Orientales (INALCO) in Paris.

She has researched the cultural practices of Yemeni migrants in Ambouli, Djibouti, putting forward the theory that Ambouli Yemenis have taken a form of "social revenge" by studying French to become officials and landowners. Djibouti was formerly a French colony and attracted migration, particularly that of merchants, in the 20th century. Mohamed has also studied trends in oral traditions in the Horn of Africa.

Mohamed has critiqued literary stereotypes of the sterile and cursed woman, through writing the play Un enfant a tout prix (A Child at Any Price), which explores the common belief that infertility in marriage must be the woman's problem.

With Marine Larocca of the French Institute of Djibouti, Mohamed published Teaching French in secondary schools in Djibouti: What place for linguistic variation? She has contributed to publications including Al-Shajarah: Journal of the International Institute of Islamic Thought and Civilisation (ISTAC).

She works as a senior lecturer in linguistics and French didactics at the University of Djibouti.
