= Hubert Curien Laboratory =

French joint research unit

The Hubert Curien Laboratory or Laboratoire Hubert Curien is a joint research unit (UMR 5516) of the University of Saint-Etienne, the National Research Centre CNRS, and (since 2016) the Institut d'Optique Graduate School. It is composed of about 90 researchers, professors and assistant professors, 20 engineers and administrative staff, and 130 Ph.D. students and postdoctoral researcher. This makes the Hubert Curien Laboratory with a total of about 240 staff the most important research structure of Saint-Etienne.

The various research activities of the laboratory are organized into two scientific departments: "Optics, photonics and microwave" and "Computer science, telecom and image". The research activity is structured into scientific projects within 6 main teams: "Micro/Nano structuring", "Radiation-matter Interaction", "Image Science & computer vision", "Data Intelligence", "Connected Intelligence" and "Secure Embedded Systems & Hardware Architectures."

The Hubert Curien laboratory coordinates the laboratory of excellence MANUTECH-SISE and the equipment of excellence MANUTECH-USD in partnership with some laboratories of the University of Lyon (LTDS, LDF, LaMCoS) and the company HEF. The partners aim at understanding the surface phenomena such as wear, friction, wetting, etc. They also aim at creating and controlling the surface functionalities, and at developing advanced manufacturing processes of surfaces and interfaces of different level, in particular processes of ultrafast laser texturation.

In the last few years, the laboratory has paying a special attention to interdisciplinary scientific projects including in materials and surface engineering, in image processing, in Computer vision or in artificial intelligence.
