= Museum of Fine Arts of Lyon =

- Musée des Beaux-Arts de Lyon (French)
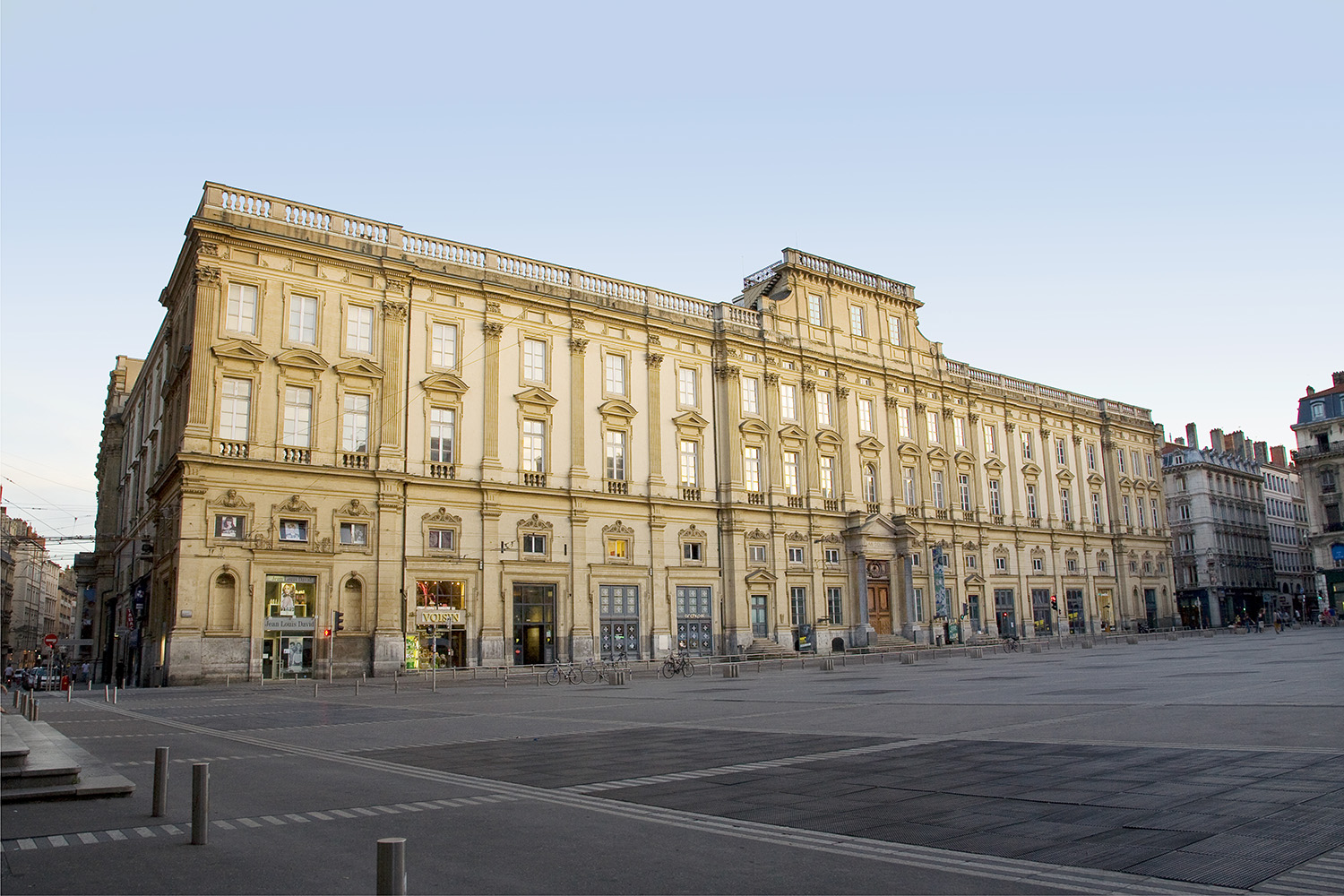
- The Museum of Fine Arts of Lyon
- Interactive fullscreen map
- Established: 1801
- Location: 20, place des Terreaux; 69001 Lyon, France
- Coordinates: 45°46′01″N 4°50′01″E
- Type: Art museum
- Website: mba-lyon.fr

The Museum of Fine Arts of Lyon (French: Musée des Beaux-Arts de Lyon, pronounced [myze de boz‿aʁ də ljɔ̃]) is a municipal museum of fine arts in the French city of Lyon. Located near the Place des Terreaux, it is housed in a former Benedictine convent which was active during the 17th and 18th centuries. It was restored between 1988, and 1998, remaining open to visitors throughout this time despite the ongoing restoration works. Its collections range from ancient Egyptian antiquities to the Modern art period, making the museum one of the most important in Europe. It also hosts important exhibitions of art, for example the exhibitions of works by Georges Braque and Henri Laurens in the second half of 2005, and another on the work of Théodore Géricault from April to July 2006. It is one of the largest art museums in France.

== Buildings ==
=== Abbey ===
Until 1792, the buildings belonged to the Royal Abbey of Saint-Pierre-les-Nonnains, which was built in the 17th century. The abbess always came from the high French nobility and here received the personalities of the kingdom. The institution had a particularly aristocratic slant, as is shown by its renovation by Louis XIV in the 17th and 18th centuries. The present state of the palais Saint-Pierre is largely down to these renovations, which included the construction of the baroque refectory and monumental honour-staircase, said to be by Thomas Blanchet. Since then, the refectory has been renovated and now serves as the reception for group visits, as well as housing two monumental paintings on the subject of dining, The Multiplication of the Loaves and The Last Supper, both by Pierre-Louis Cretey. The rest of its current layout was designed by Nicolas Bidaut and Simon Guillaume and is made up of sculptures.

=== The Palais du commerce et des Arts ===
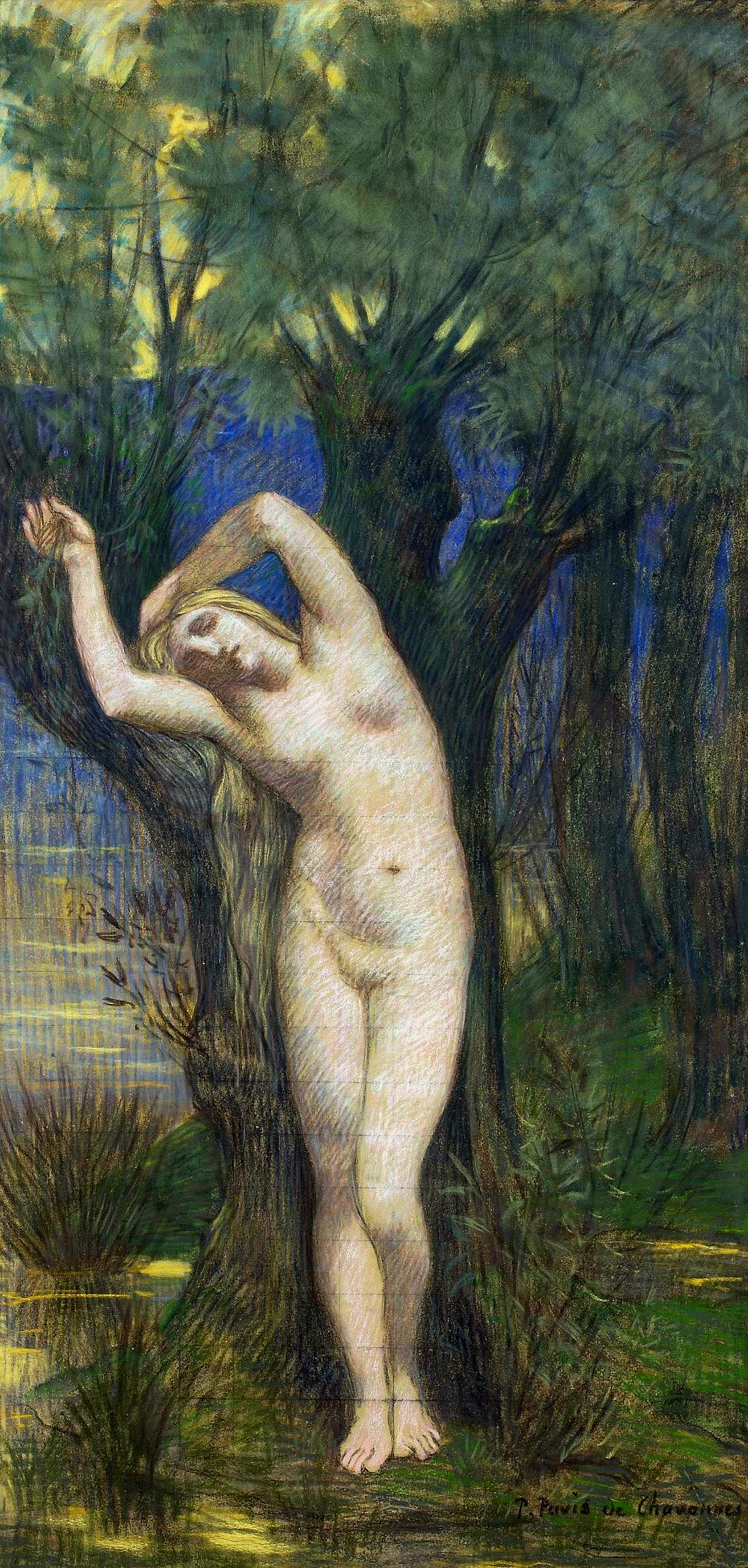
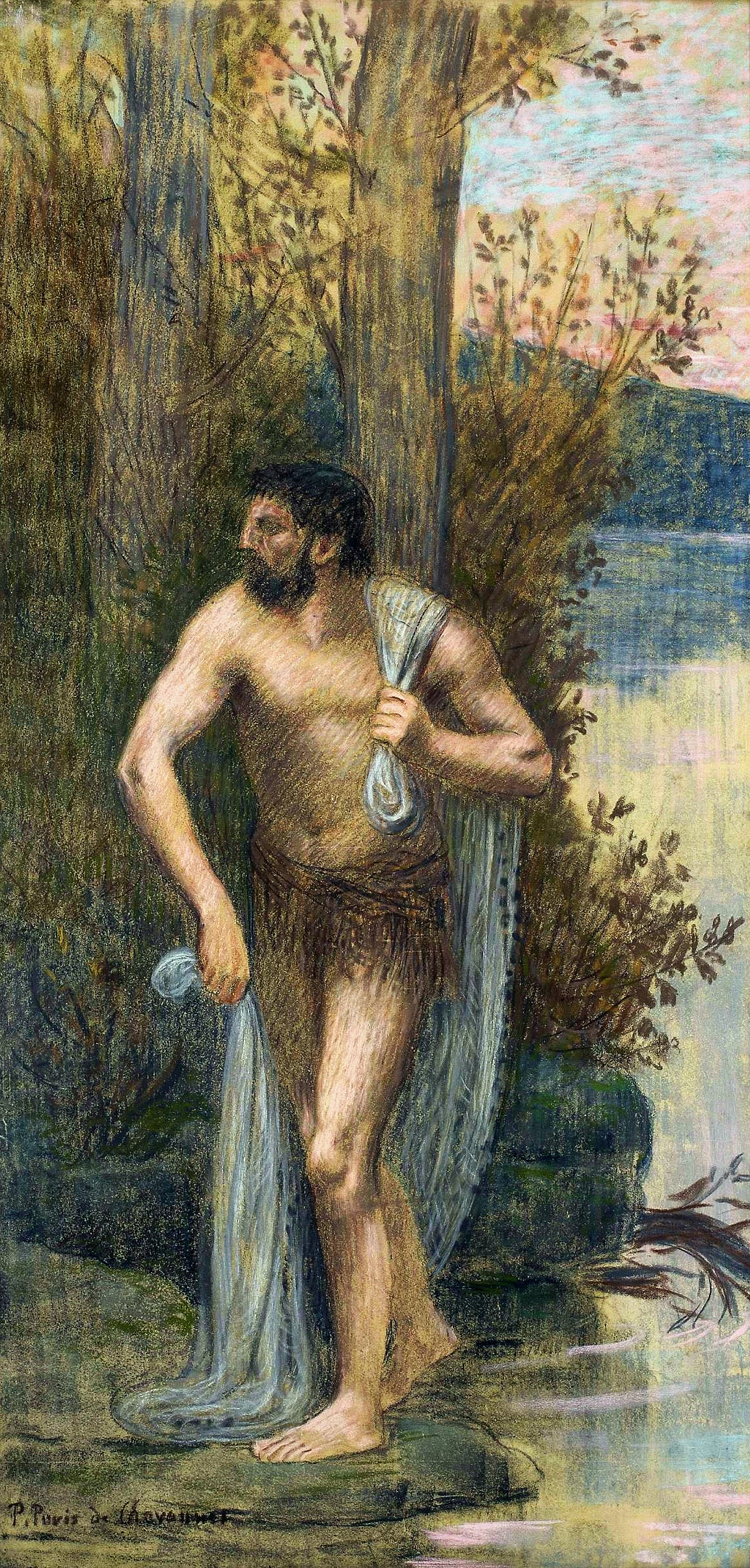
Personification of the Saône and the Rhône by Pierre Puvis de Chavannes, 1883-1886, National Museum in Warsaw, a study for decoration of the staircase in the new wing of the Palace of Fine Arts in Lyon, a city at the confluence of the Saône and Rhône rivers.

The expulsion of the nuns and the destruction of the église Saint-Saturnin date to the French Revolution, though the abbey's other church (the église Saint-Pierre) still exists and now houses 19th and 20th century sculptures. After the Revolution, the remaining buildings housed the Palais du Commerce et des Arts, at first made up of works confiscated from the clergy and nobility but later becoming more multi-disciplinary. For example, it gained archaeology and natural history collections and those of the Académie des Sciences et des Lettres. The imperial drawing school was created in 1805, in the Palais du Commerce et des Arts to provide Lyon's silk factories with designers, giving birth to the famous Lyon School. In 1860, the Chambre de Commerce left the Palais Saint-Pierre and the establishment became the Palais des Arts. From 1875, the museum's collections underwent a major expansion and had to be expanded — the staircase by Pierre Puvis de Chavannes dates to this era.

=== The Musée des Beaux-Arts ===
The collections were opened up considerably at the start of the 20th century, leading to the Palais des Arts becoming the Musée des Beaux-Arts. The building acquired its present layout in the mid-1990s, after the completion of several restoration projects.

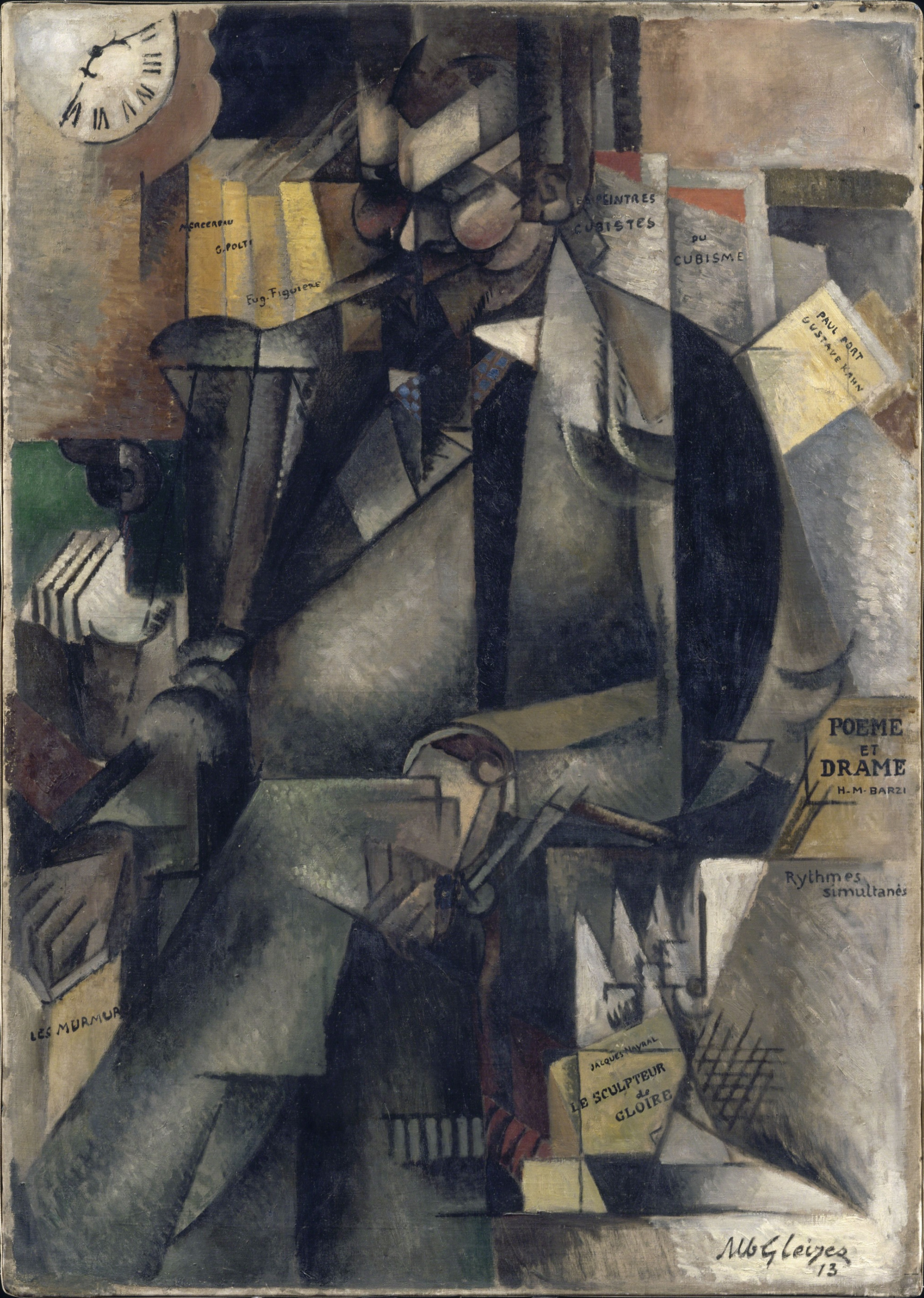
Albert Gleizes, 1913, Portrait de l’éditeur Eugène Figuière (The Publisher Eugene Figuiere), oil on canvas, 143.5 x 101.5 cm

== Collections ==
=== Paintings ===
The paintings department has European 14th- to mid-20th-century paintings. They are arranged chronologically and by major schools in 35 rooms. The collection features:

- Ancient French painting (16th to 18th century) (Nicolas Poussin, Simon Vouet, Philippe de Champaigne, Eustache Lesueur, Charles Le Brun, Hyacinthe Rigaud, François Boucher, Jean-Baptiste Greuze, Adrien Manglard, Claude Joseph Vernet etc.)
- 19th-century French painting (Ingres, Géricault, Delacroix, Degas, Renoir, Manet, Morisot, Cézanne, Gauguin, Van Gogh etc.)
- 14th- to 18th-century Italian painting (Perugino, Lorenzo Costa, Veronese, Tintoretto, Correggio, Guido Reni, Domenichino, Pietro da Cortona, Guercino, Salvator Rosa, Luca Giordano, Mattia Preti, Canaletto, Francesco Guardi, Giandomenico Tiepolo etc.)
- Ancient Spanish painting (mainly 17th century) (El Greco, Jusepe de Ribera, Francisco de Zurbarán etc.)
- Ancient German, Flemish and Dutch painting (mainly 16th and 17th centuries) (Lucas Cranach the Elder, Quentin Metsys, Rubens, Anthony van Dyck, Jacob Jordaens, Gerard David, Rembrandt etc.)
- 20th-century painting (including Édouard Vuillard, Pierre Bonnard, Georges Rouault, Henri Matisse, Pablo Picasso, Georges Braque, Albert Gleizes, André Derain, Maurice de Vlaminck, Amedeo Modigliani, Fernand Léger, Joan Miró, Giorgio de Chirico, Max Ernst, Francis Bacon and painters of the Paris School etc.)
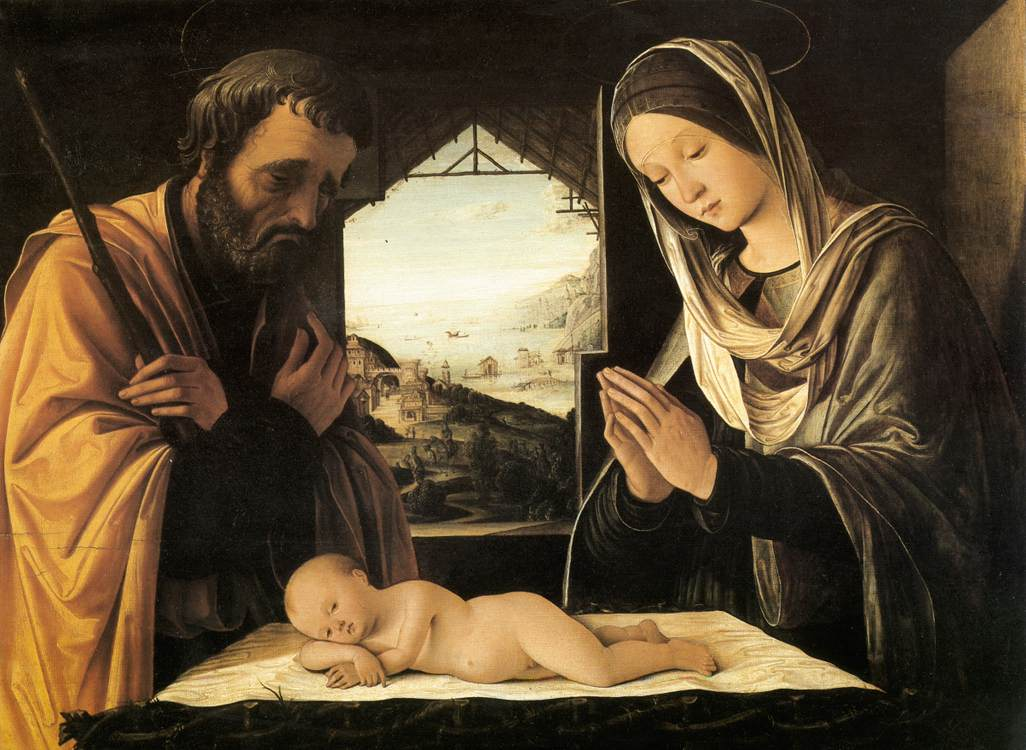
The Nativity, Lorenzo Costa (c 1490)

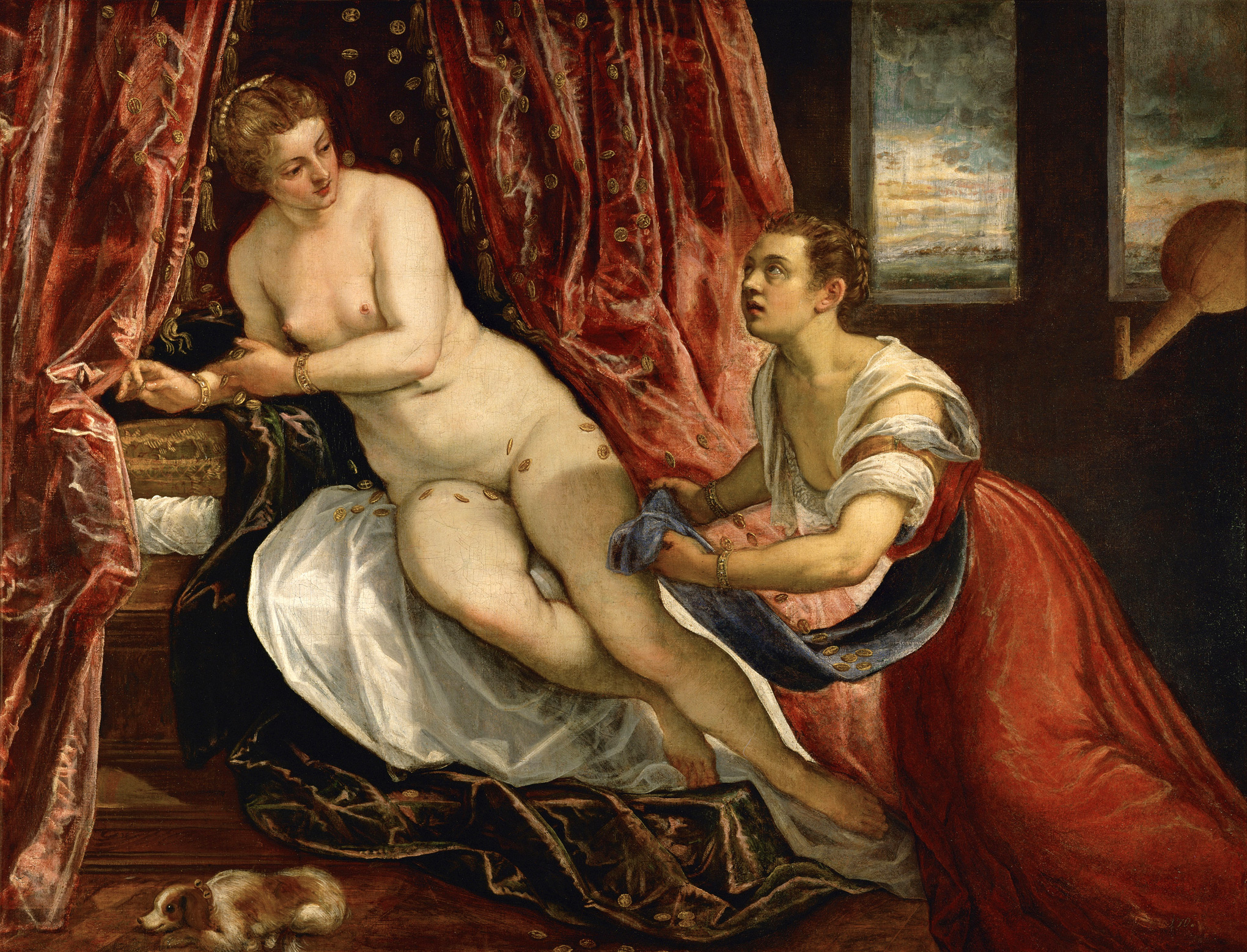
Danae, Tintoretto (c 1570)

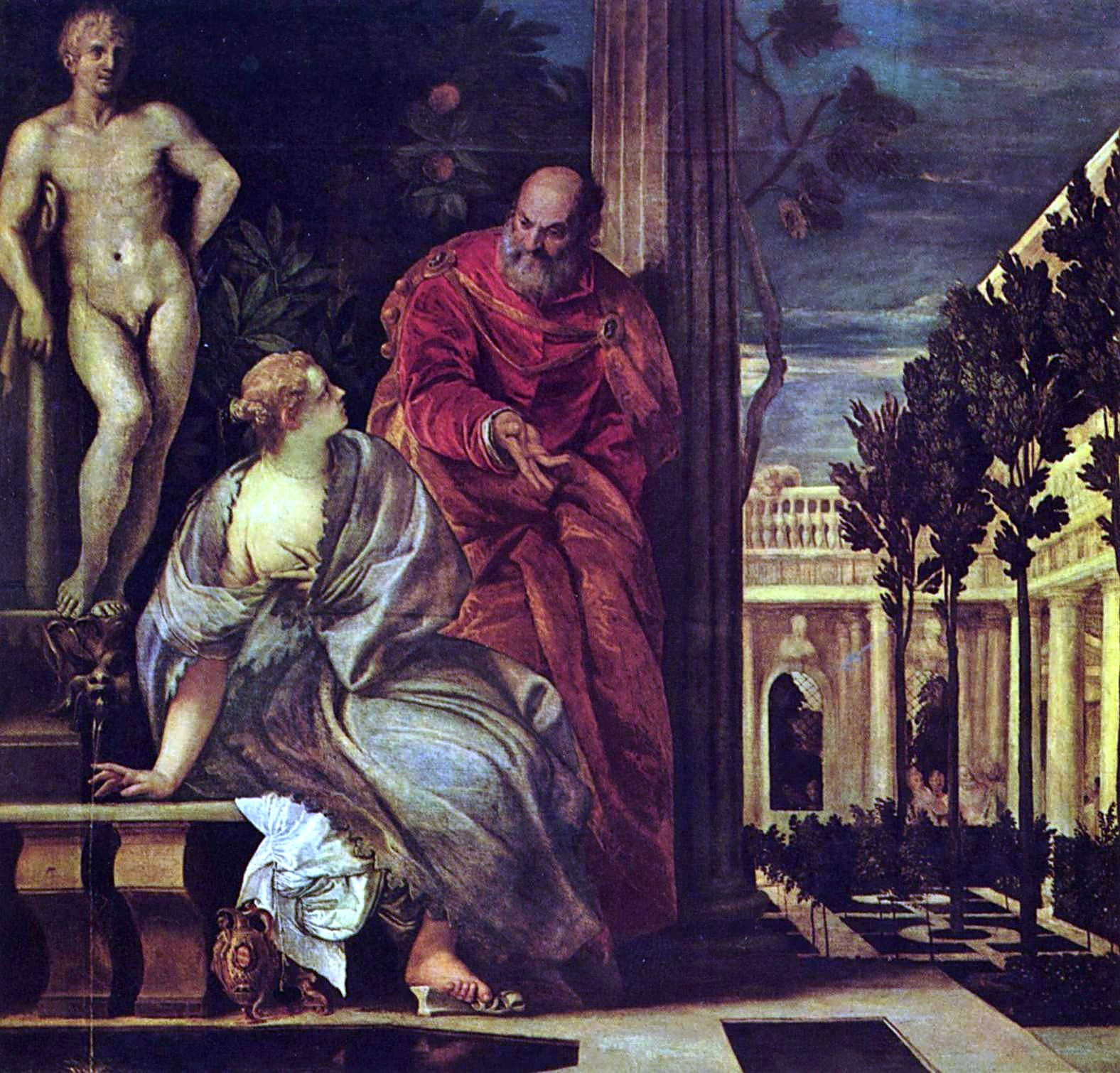
Bathsheba at Bath, Veronese (c 1575)

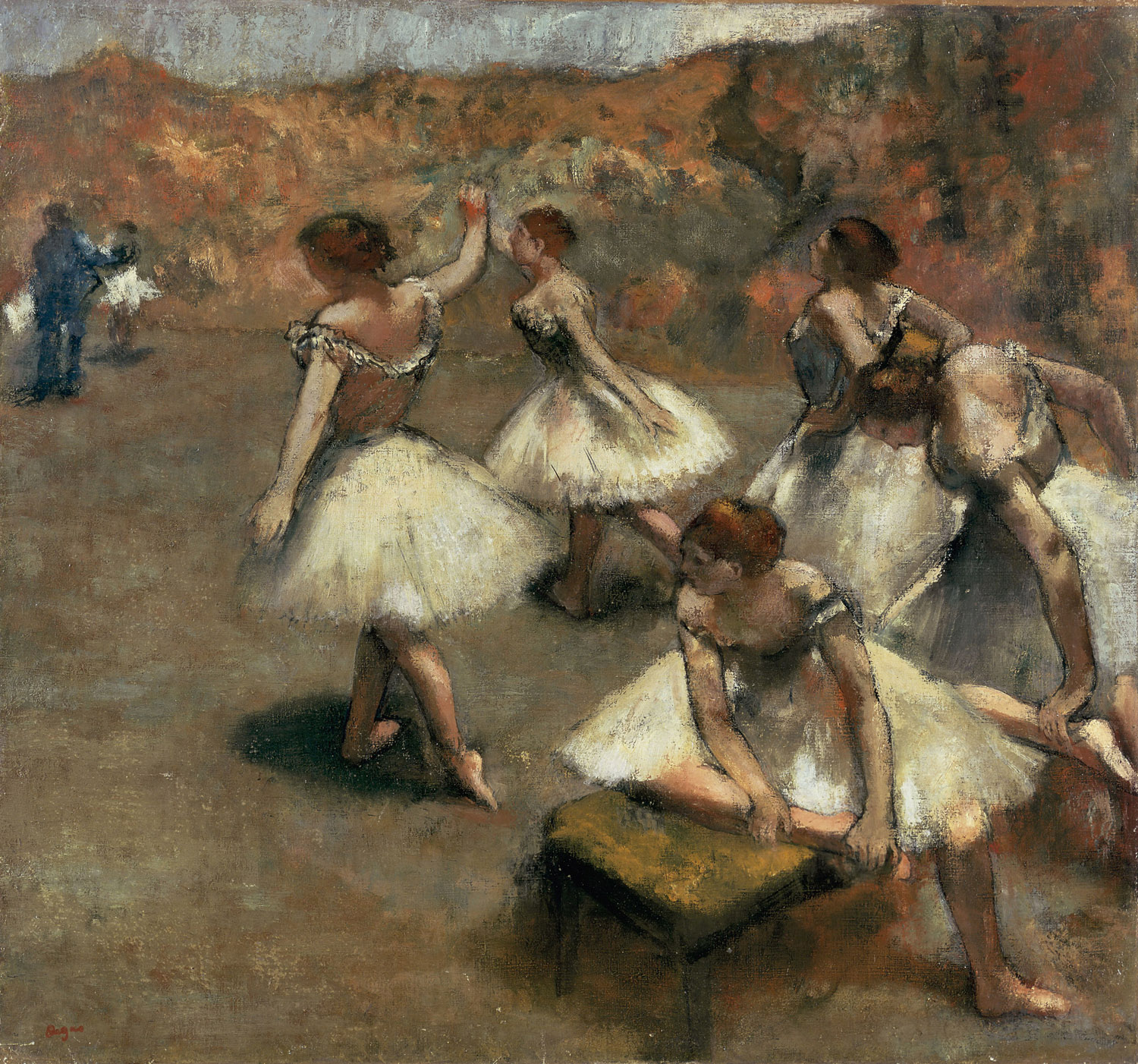
Danseuses sur scène, Edgar Degas (c 1889)

La Lecture, Henri Fantin-Latour (1877)
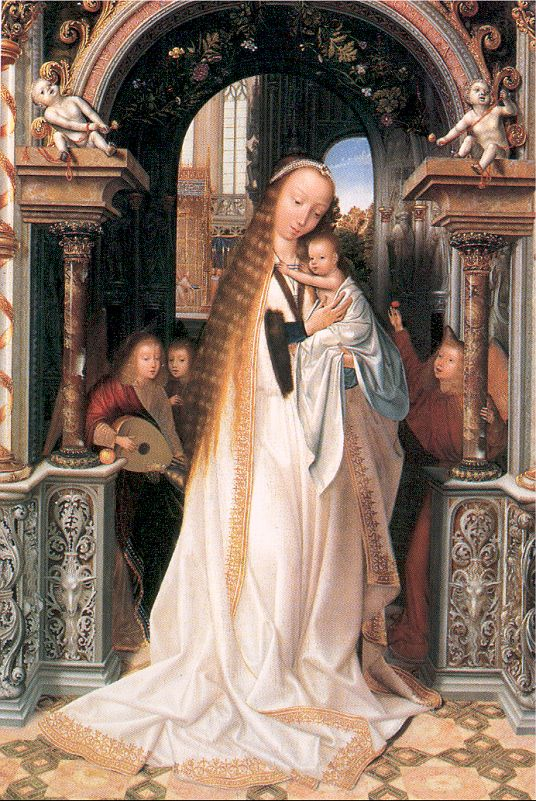
Virgin and Child with angels, Quentin Metsys (c 1509)

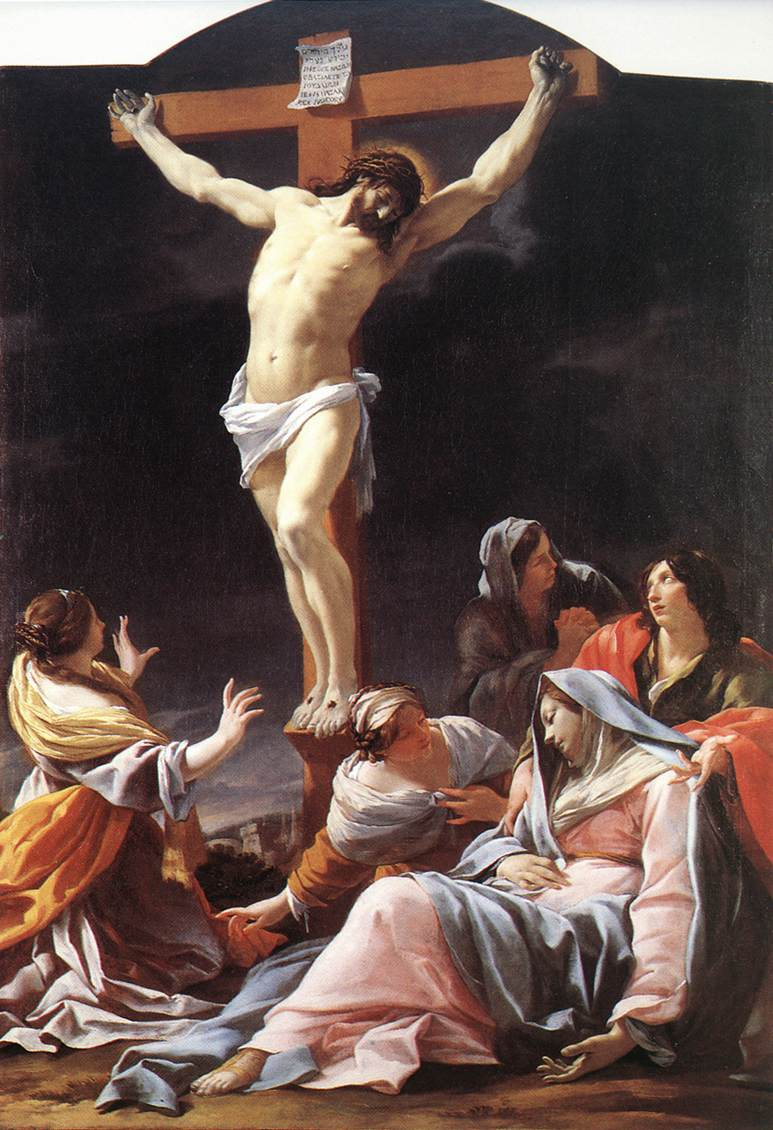
Crucifixion, Simon Vouet (c 1636-37)

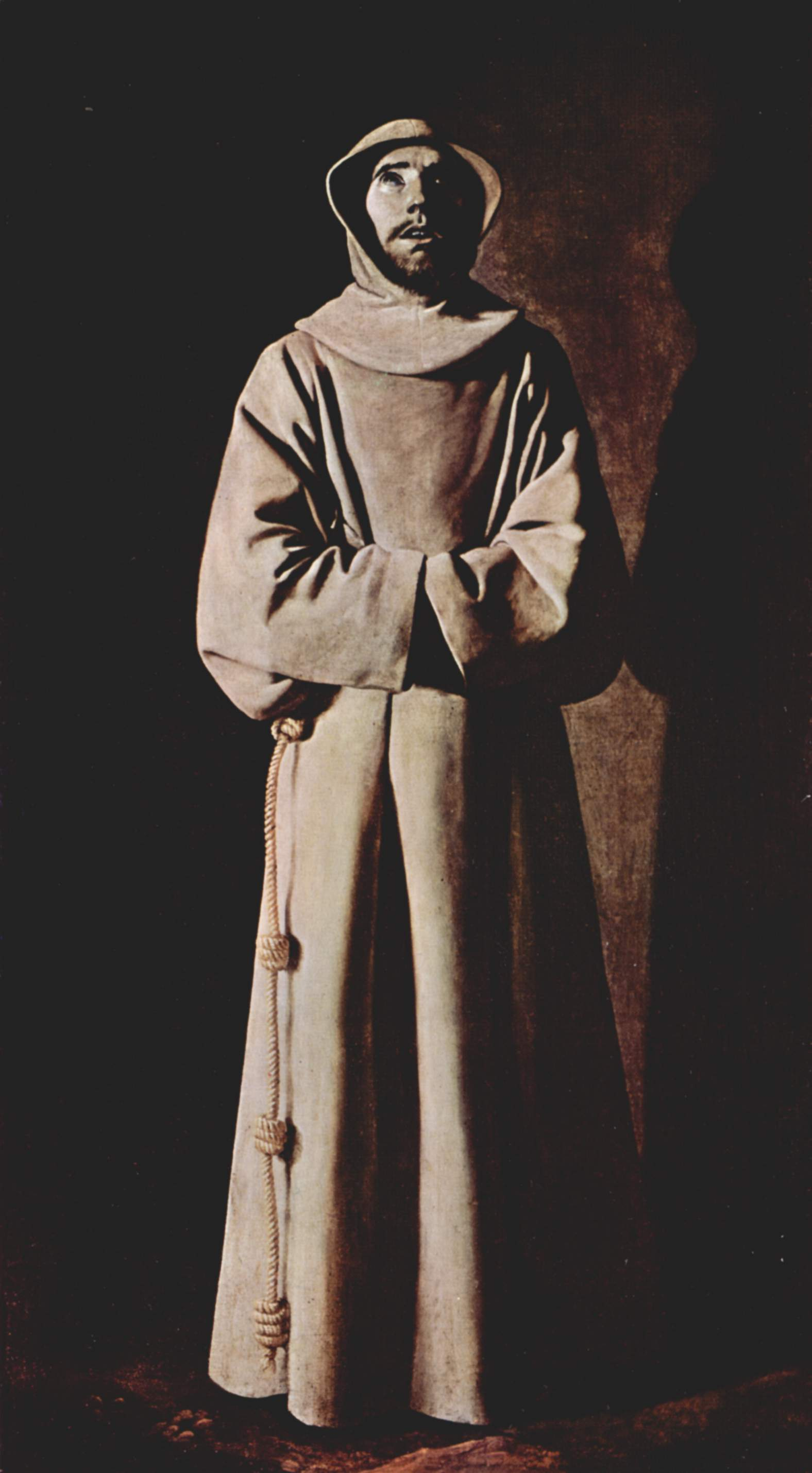
Saint Francis, Francisco de Zurbarán (c 1645)

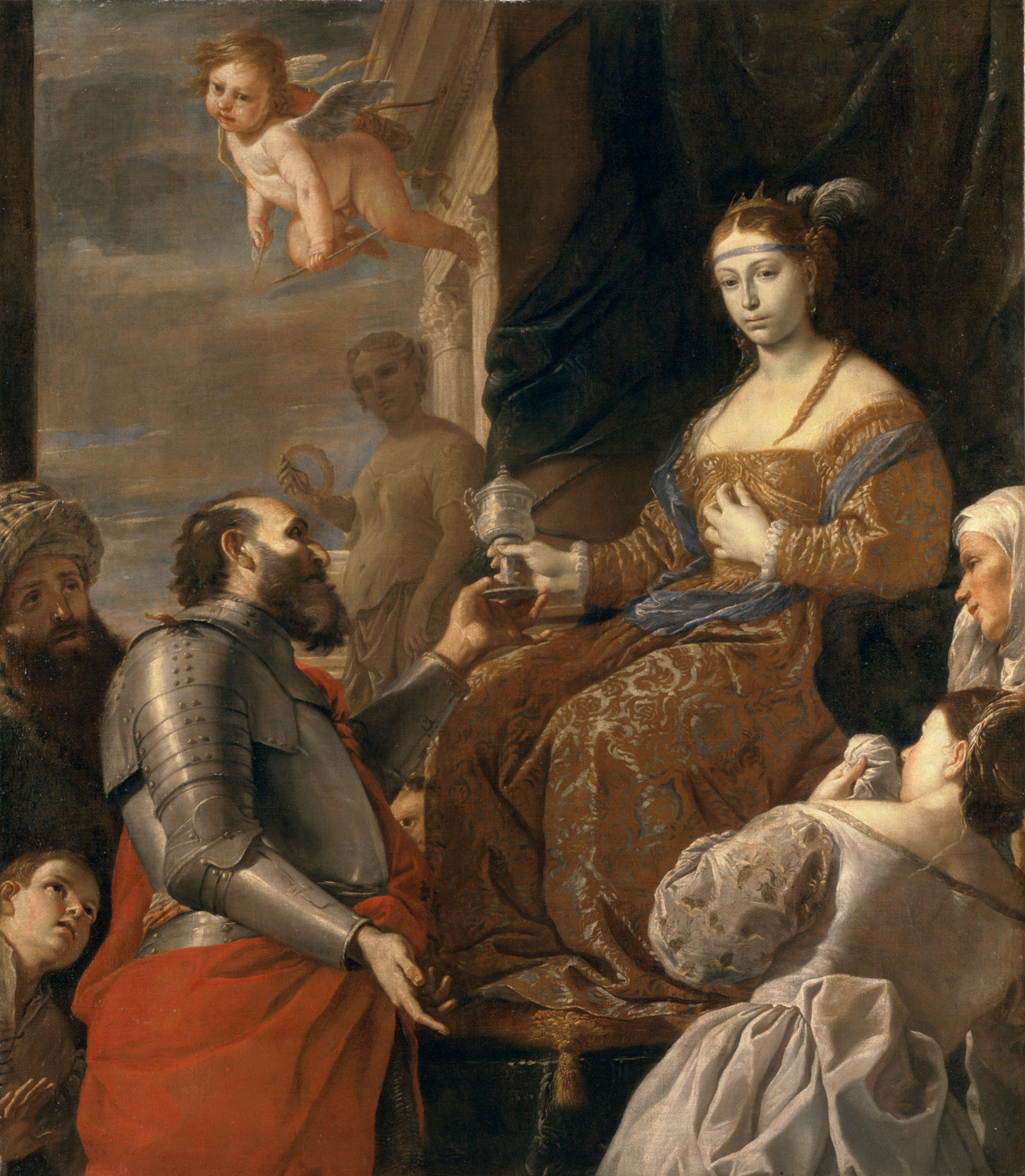
The Death of Sophonisba, Mattia Preti (c 1665)

=== Sculptures ===
Most of the collection is displayed in two sections: on the ground floor are Medieval and Renaissance sculptures and stuccos of the old baroque refectory; and in the abbey's church are sculptures from the 19th and early 20th centuries.

At the heart of the abbey, the former cloister is now a municipal garden, right in the centre of the town, on the peninsula. It is decorated with several 19th-century statues:

- two sculptures by Auguste Rodin: The shadow, or Adam (1902) and The temptation of Saint Anthony (1900)
- a sculpture by Léon-Alexandre Delhomme representing Democrites meditating on the seat of the soul (1864)
- a sculpture by Emile Antoine Bourdelle representing Carpeaux at work (1909)
- a Venus (1918–1928) by Aristide Maillol
- an Odalisque (1841) by James Pradier
- a group by Antoine Etex representing Cain and His Race Cursed By God
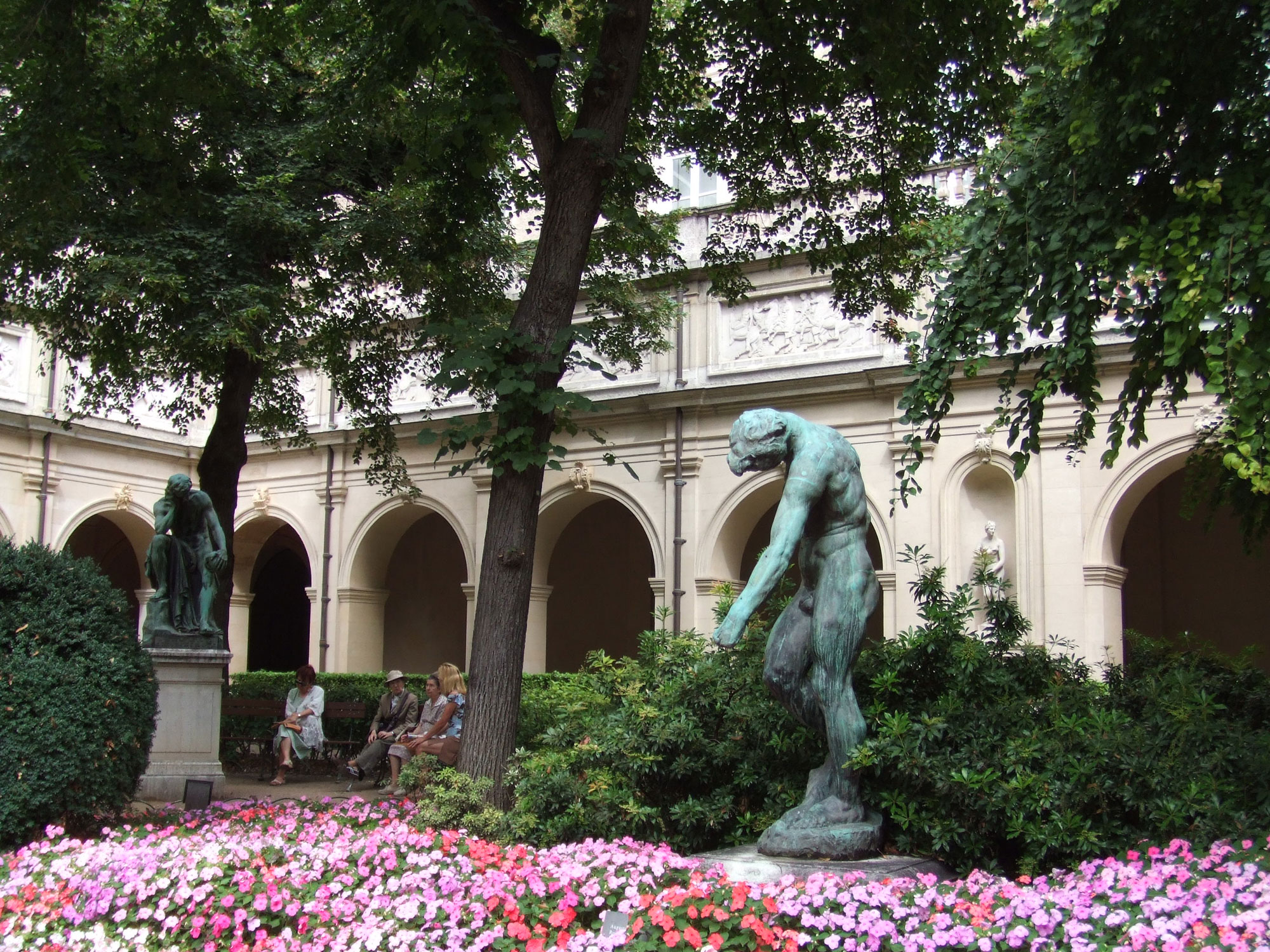
Foreground : The shadow or Adam by Rodin; background Democrites meditating on the seat of the soul
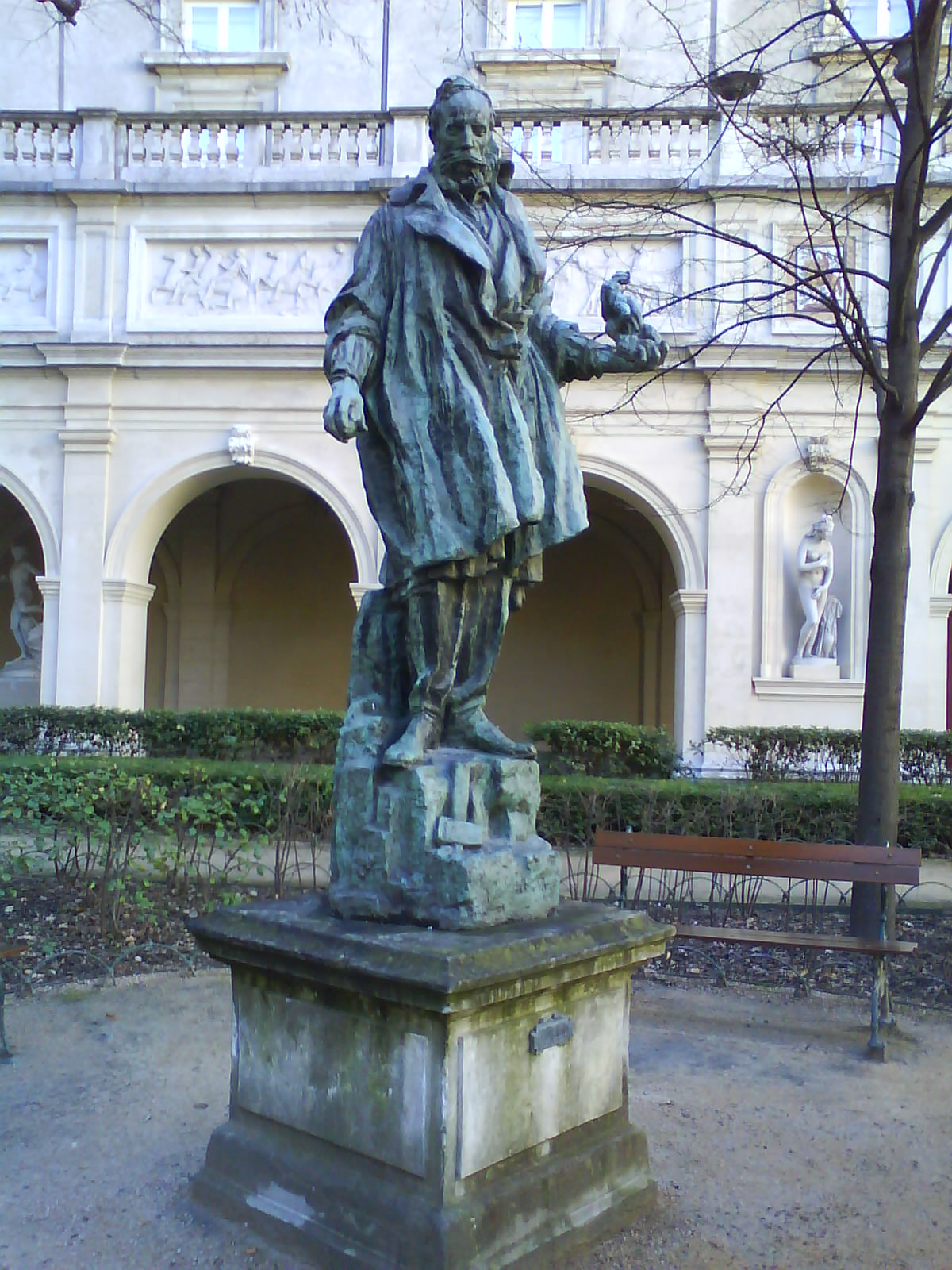
Carpeaux au travail, sculpted by Antoine Bourdelle, in homage to Jean-Baptiste Carpeaux.

=== Antiquities ===
==== Egypt ====
Ancient Egypt is the main theme of the museum's antiquities department, due to the historic importance of egyptology in Lyon, encouraged by men like Victor Loret, whose family gave over 1000 objects to the museum in 1954. From 1895, the musée du Louvre provided nearly 400 objects (unguent vases, funerary figurines etc.) to form the foundation of the department; other objects (canopic vases, jewellery, material from Antinoöpolis) were added later to complement this initial donation, and were augmented in 1936 by objects from the artisans' village of Deir el-Medina.

The highlights of the collection are its display of sarcophaguses and the gates of Ptolemy III and Ptolemy IV from the temple of Medamud dug by the Lyons archaeologist Alexandre Varille in 1939 and donated by the French Institute of Oriental Archeology of Cairo. The remaining objects shed light on everyday life in ancient Egypt.

The collection has 600 works displayed in 9 rooms, in a thematic and chronological sequence:

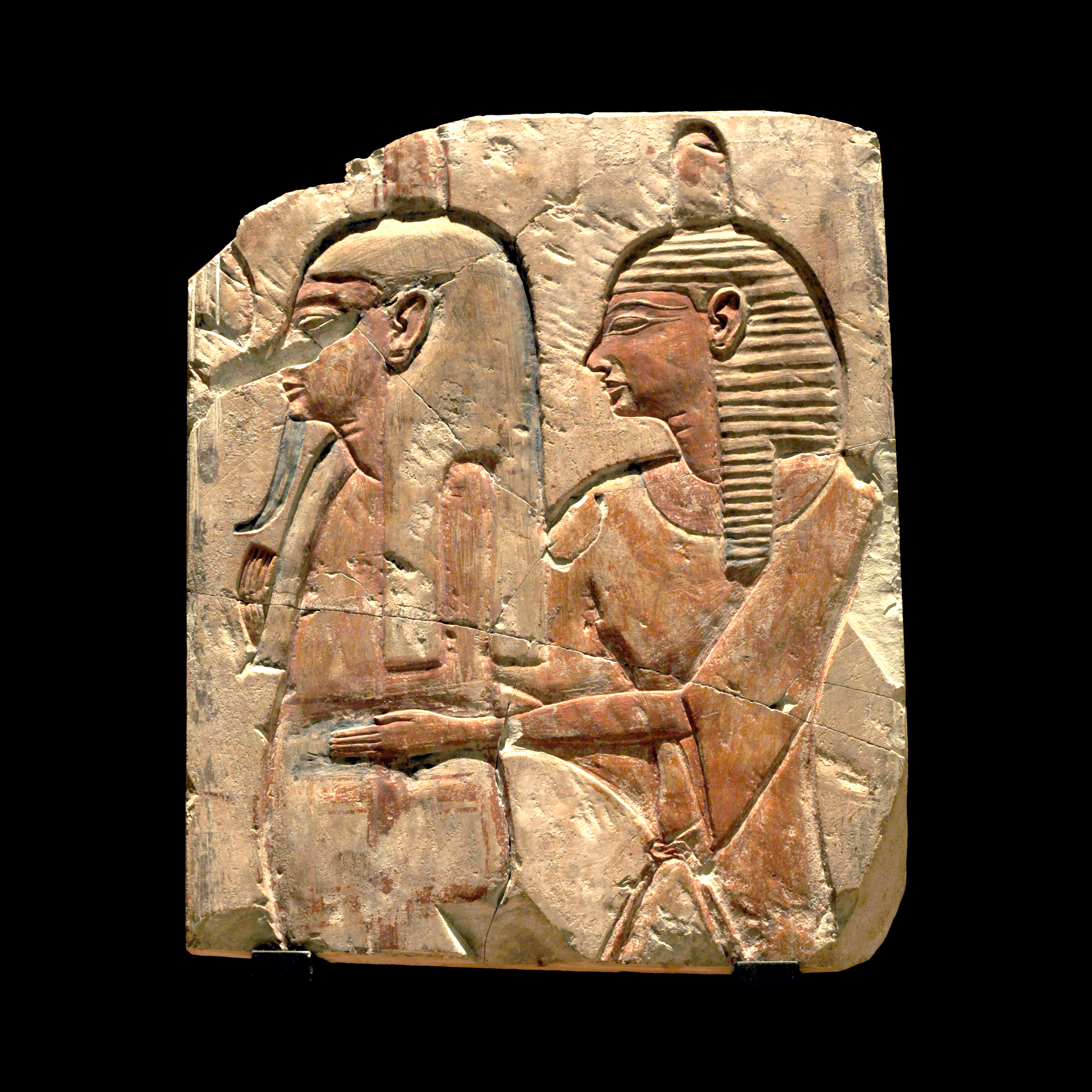
Fragment of the funerary bas-relief probably from Deir-el-Bahari, 20th Dynasty.

- Room 1 : Life After Death
  The development of funerary practices are explored via a display of Old Kingdom to Late Period coffins, canopic vases, organs, shabtis and 155 amulets on a variety of subjects. There is also a fragment of the tomb of Bakenranef found at Saqqarah, dating to the 26th Dynasty, as well as a Roman-era shroud.

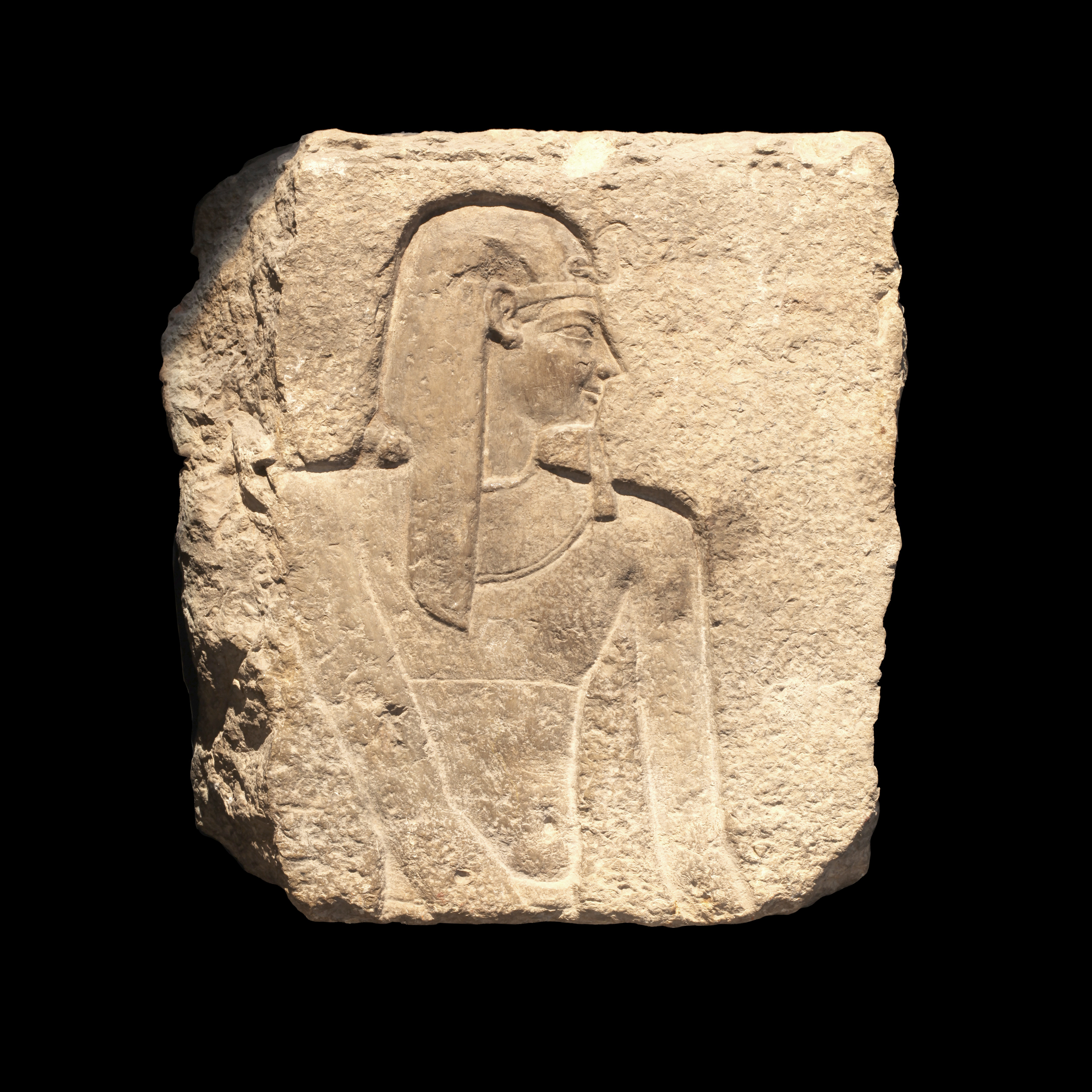
Fragment of a bas-relief from the temple of Cleopatra VII and Caesarion, Koptos, 1st century BC

- Room 2 : The divine and its rites
  Decorations from a temple are recreated along the length of this room, culminating with the gates of Ptolemy III and Ptolemy IV from the late temple at Medamud (the former is fragmentary but retains part of its original polychromy, whereas the latter is nearly complete). The other bas-reliefs in this room come from Koptos - eight are dated to the Middle Kingdom and come from a temple to Min. They were discovered by Adolphe Reinach in 1909 in the foundations of a late building. 11 other fragments come from the end of the Ptolemaic era, and more precisely from the reign of Cleopatra VII. Even if Pharaonic statuary is underrepresented in the museum, the fragment of the statue of Ramses VI in pink granite and the outline of the statue of Commodus as pharaoh document this aspect of Egyptian art.
- Room 3 : The cult of the divine
  Entered through the gate of Ptolemy IV, at the centre of this room is a support from a barque or statue dating to the reign of Ptolemy II. On the walls are three fragments of bas-reliefs from the 28th Dynasty, also found in Koptos.

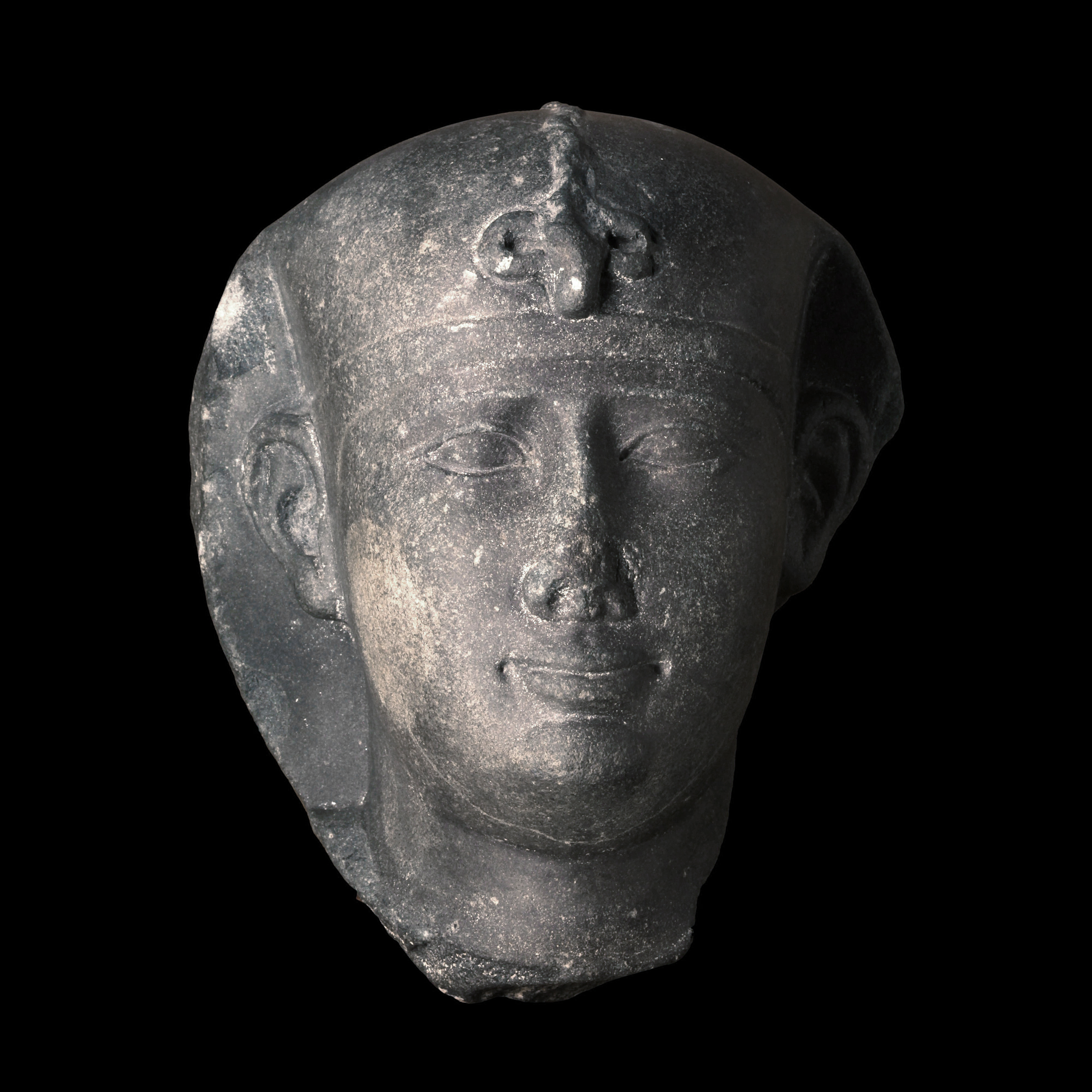
Green sandstone head of a king of Nectanebo II.

- Room 4 : Images and emblems of the divine
  This room's three cases contain a collection of bronze statuettes of Gods from the Egyptian pantheon, with a rare representation of Hapi, god of the Nile, dating from the Late Period. One whole case is devoted to representations of Osiris and another to those of the pharaoh. In this room is the head of a pharaoh of the 30th Dynasty, attributed to Nectanebo II, a Middle Kingdom bust (characterised by its over-large ears), and a scarab with the name of Amenhotep II.
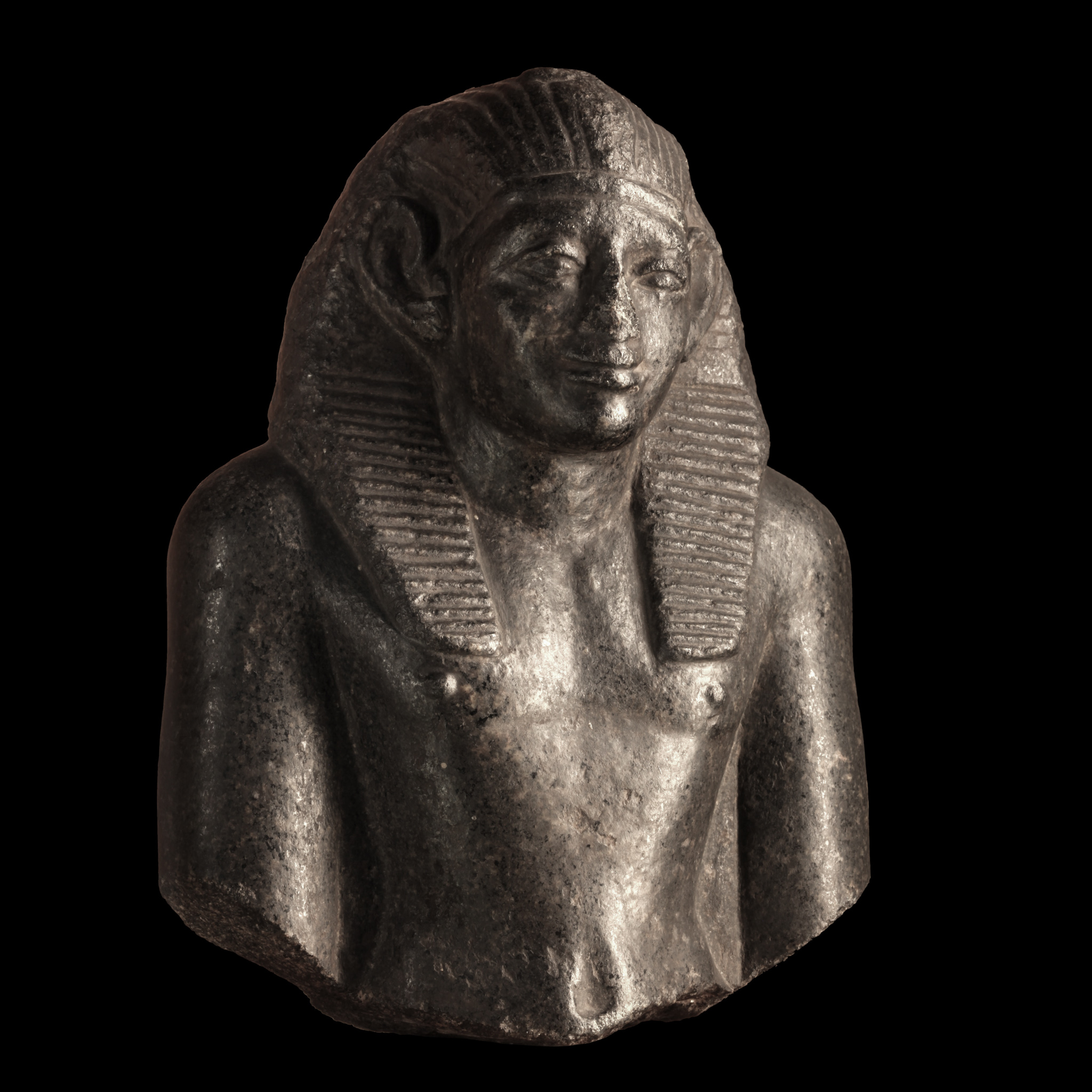
Bust of a pharaoh, Middle Kingdom

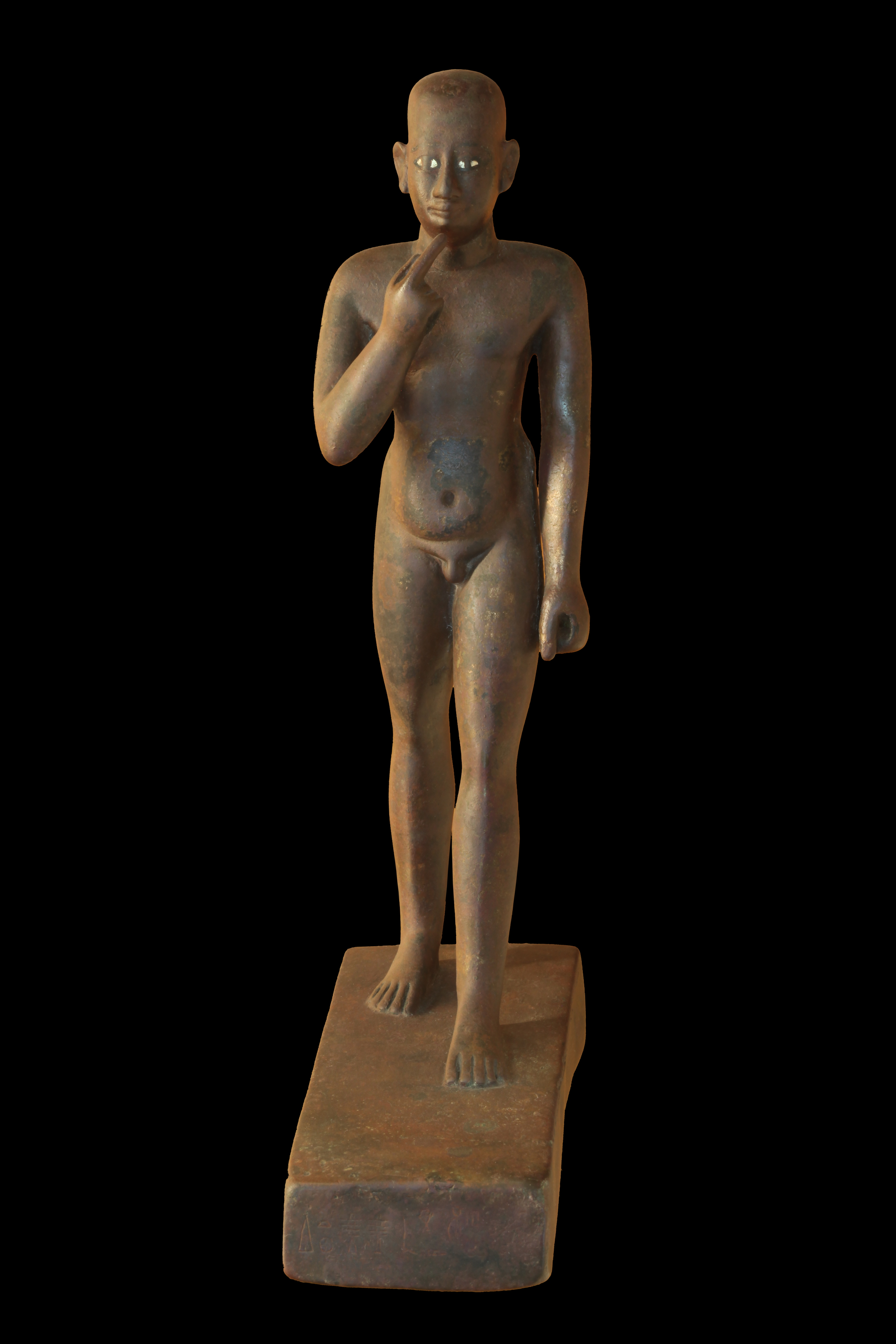
Statuette of the child Horus, Late Period

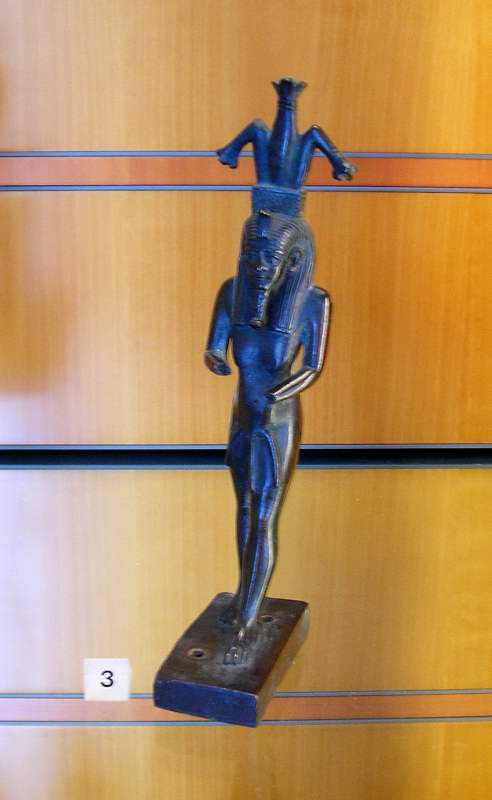
Statuette of the Nile God Hâpy, Late Period

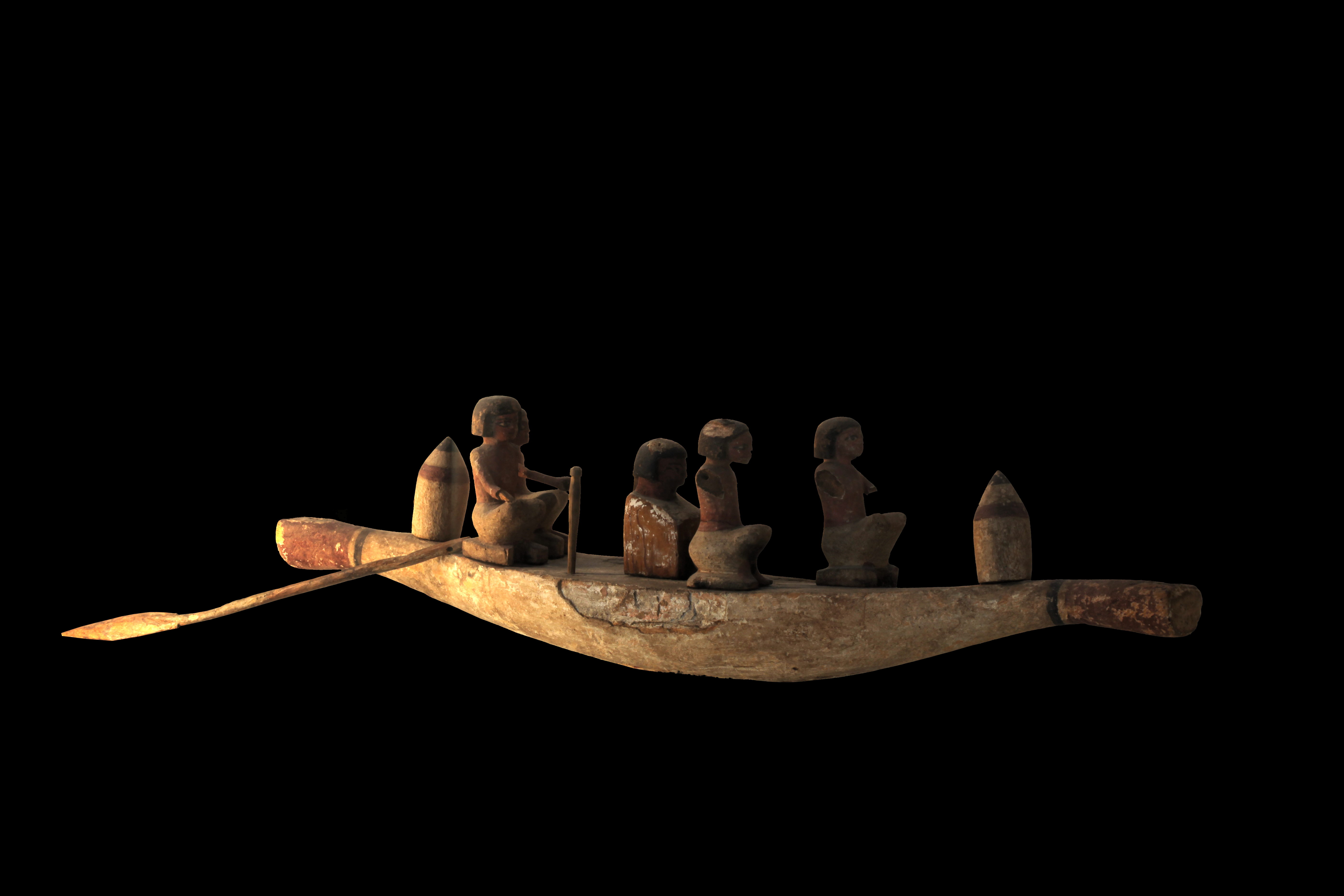
Wooden boat model, Assiout, 12th Dynasty

- Room 5 : Pharaoh and his servants
  In one case are 18 wooden models obtained from tombs from the time of the 23rd Dynasty from Assiout. They represent scenes from everyday life such as grazing cattle, or beer-making. In the opposite case are two displays: one on writing, and the other on the pharaoh's servants. The latter has, among other objects, a limestone statue of an anonymous Old Kingdom couple, a Ptolemaic male bust, and a fragment of a statuette of a kneeling scribe.
- Room 6 : Stelae
  Arranged around a wooden statue of Osiris are four Middle Kingdom stelae, eight New Kingdom stelae, and four from the Roman era. One of the most beautiful is that of Ptahmose, high priest of Amon, vizir of Thebes and chief of works under Amenophis III, which retains traces of its polychromy.
- Room 7 : Everyday life
  One case contains 14 protohistoric and pre-dynastic vases, whilst another shows a selection of vases spanning the New Kingdom to the Late Period. The main display in this room contains many unique pieces, such as the 2nd Dynasty stela of Nes-Henou, or the magnificent wooden male head of the 28th Dynasty, perhaps part of the ornamentation of a harp. It also contains everyday objects like sandals, mirrors, jewellery, and even a stool.
- Room 8 : Egypt and the Greeks - Egypt and Rome
  This room explores Greek and Roman influences on Egyptian art. This is especially prevalent in private works of art such as a series of terracotta figurines of Egyptian Gods with Hellenistic traits, and five 2nd and 3rd century funerary stelae from Koptos showing Palmyrenean influence.
- Room 9 : Egypt and the Roman Empire - Coptic Christianity
  This room houses gold-plated funerary masks from the Roman period; and bas-reliefs, pateras and textiles from the Coptic civilisation, including a fragment of the famous "shawl of Sabina".

==== Near East and Middle East ====
One room contains cylinder seals, clay tablets and bas-reliefs from the Sumerian, Assyrian and Babylonian civilisations, as well as Luristan bronzes, ceramics and statuettes from Cyprus and a fine collection of Syrian objects (including an anthropoid sarcophagus and a marble bas-relief).

==== Ancient Greece and Italy ====
A single room is devoted to the main work in this department, the 6th century BC marble kore from the Acropolis of Athens. A second room is dedicated to ancient Greece, containing a series of Attic vases in black-figure or red-figure, bronzes and terracotta Tanagra figurines. Finally, a small room is devoted to Magna Graecia, with many ceramics and bronze helmets.

Roman sculpture is also presented across several rooms - marble statues (a torso of Venus, a child on a cockerel, statues of draped figures etc.) and also small bronze figurines of Gods from the Roman Pantheon such as Mercury, Venus, Mars etc.

The Gallo-Roman collections of the city of Lyon, previously presented at the Museum of Fine Arts and the Antiquarium, were transferred in 1975 at the Lugdunum museum on the hill of Fourvière near the Roman theatre and Odeon.

=== Objets d’Art ===
This department's collection ranges from the Middle Ages to the 20th century and includes:

- Byzantine ivories
- Limoges enamels
- Renaissance faience and maiolica
- Art Nouveau room by Hector Guimard
- Islamic art
- Far East ceramics
- Chinese, Korean and Japanese stoneware (since 1917) - rare pieces illustrating the tea ceremony, displayed next to the Art Nouveau ceramics they inspired.
- The Death of Polydorus, tapestry
- Silk fabrics produced by Lyon's silk manufacturing trade, including works by Jean-François Bony.

=== Coins and medals ===
Lyon's "médaillier" is the second largest one in France after that in Paris, with nearly 50,000 coins, medals, seals and other objects. It is known at a European level and has held a prominent place in the numismatic world from its beginnings in the 19th century to recent discoveries of the treasuries of the Terreaux and the Célestins.

=== Graphic arts ===
This department was created at the start of the 19th century and includes works on paper - drawings, prints, engravings, watercolours etc. - based on line rather than colour. In all it more than 8,000 works, including ones by Filippino Lippi, Parmigianino, Fra Bartolomeo, Leonetto Cappiello, Nicolas Poussin, François Boucher, Ingres, Théodore Géricault, Eugène Delacroix, Camille Corot, Honoré Daumier, Odilon Redon, Puvis de Chavannes, Edgar Degas, Henri Matisse, Fernand Léger and a remarkable study by Albrecht Dürer.

== Magazine ==
On the initiative of René Jullian, in 1952 the Bulletin des musées lyonnais was created, and 8 years later changed its name to Bulletin des musées et monuments Lyonnais. In 2003 it changed to an annual publication and again changed its name, to Cahiers du musée des Beaux-Arts de Lyon.

== Collection ==
- Cloth of St Gereon, a fragment the museum has in its inventory. It is one of the oldest European tapestries in existence.

== See also ==
Abbey of Saint-Pierre-les-Nonnains
