= Jean Monnet University =

French public university

Coordinates: 45.42672°N 4.39166°E

- Université Jean Monnet
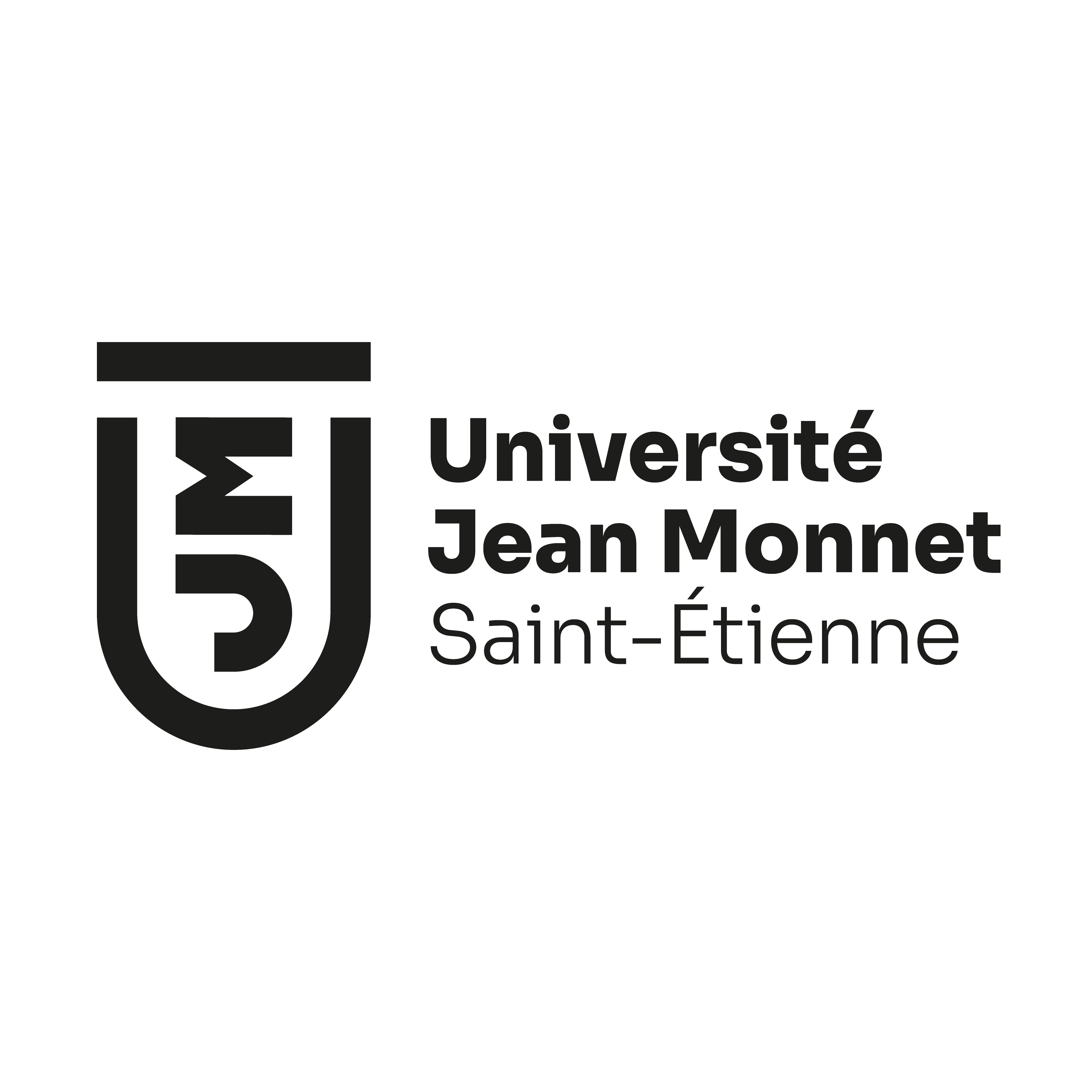
- Type: Public
- Established: 1969
- Budget: 163 M€
- President: Florent Pigeon
- Students: 20,000
- Location: Saint-Étienne Roanne, France
- Campus: Campus Tréfilerie, Campus Manufacture, Campus Santé Innovations, Campus Métare, Campus de Roanne
- Website: Univ-st-etienne.fr

Jean Monnet University (French: Université Jean Monnet, UJM, also known as Université de Saint-Étienne) is a public research university based in Saint-Étienne, France. It is under the Academy of Lyon and belongs to the administrative entity denominated University of Lyon, which gathers different schools in Lyon and Saint-Étienne.

== History ==
The plan to develop a university at Saint-Etienne was first devised in 1960. On March 27, 1969, the University of Saint-Étienne was officially created. From the outset, in tune with its time, it has set up classic university teaching which allows it to present today almost all of the disciplines and professional fields. The beginning of the 1990s saw in particular the creation of an engineering school and a second IUT, in Roanne in addition to that of Saint-Étienne, as well as numerous professional second and third cycle degrees. Also from the outset, it has focused its efforts on permanent training, in terms of research, original niches in the context of the Rhône-Alpes region.

In 1989, it took the name of Jean Monnet, one of the founders of the European Union. Faithful to the latter, in 2003-2004 it brought its diplomas to European time by adopting the LMD system (license, master, doctorate).

On July 23, 2008, it was one of the twenty pilot universities, chosen by the government, to be autonomous. Thus, the university has been managing her budget herself since 1 January 2009.

Since 2017, a plan to merge this establishment with several others based in Lyon has been under discussion. This merger caused tensions since 2019, the lack of preservation of the Saint-Etienne identity being cited by many stakeholders.

== Campus ==
The main campus is located in Tréfilerie, in the city of Saint-Étienne. It houses arts, languages and letters courses, with law, economics and management, human sciences and the Maison de l'Université (administrative building).

Sciences and sports are studied in Metare campus, which is located in a less urbanized place in the city. A University Institute of Technology (IUT) is located in Metare too, providing some short courses over two or three years.

Optic and vision and the engineering school Telecom Saint-Etienne are located in the Carnot campus in the north of the city. The Hubert Curien Laboratory, which is composed of about 90 researchers, professors and assistant professors, 20 engineers and administrative staff, and 130 Ph.D. students and postdoctoral researcher, is devoted to optic, image and computer science, is located there and works in association with the university. This makes it the most important research structure at Saint-Étienne.

Bellevue campus houses the medicine faculty. Another campus is located in the city of Roanne, with a second University Institute of Technology.

The population at Jean Monnet is considered to be traditionally hospitable because of its proximity to the traditional town of Saint-Étienne.

== Organisation ==
The university is organised across five main domains and a subsidiary domain over the different campuses:

Law, Economics and Management

- Faculty of Law
- IAE, Saint-Etienne
- Institute of Work
- Department of Political Studies
- Saint-Etienne School of Economics

Arts, Letters, Languages

- Faculty of Arts, Letters, Languages

Social and Human Sciences

- Faculty of Social and Human Sciences

Sciences, Technologies

- Faculty of Science and Technology
- TELECOM Saint-Etienne

Health

- Faculty of Medicine

Multi-disciplinary Sector

- Roanne Campus
- IUT, Saint-Etienne
- IUT, Roanne
- Service Universitaire de la Formation Continue (SUFC)
- L'Université Pour Tous (UPT)

== Scholarships and financial aid ==
The university offers scholarships to high-achieving international students. Students are given the scholarships to attract them to the Erasmus Mundas Masters Program, with the idea that they will continue with their PhD. The scholarship amounts to 10,000 Euro per student. The scholarship lasts for the duration of the Master's program.

== Academics and research ==
Jean Monnet University offers around 300 national diploma programs from undergraduate to doctorate level in Arts, Letters, Languages, Humanities and Social Sciences, Law, Economics and Management, Athletics, Health, Sciences and Technologies. The university has always been involved in a number of national and international research projects financed through different kinds of organisation, some of which are as follows:

- the EACEA Lifelong Learning Programme

- the EACEA Intensive Programme

- the EACEA Erasmus Mundus Programme, coordinating two Mundus masters : CIMET (www.master-erasmusmundus-color.eu) and MACLANDS (www.maclands.fr) and partner in Action 2 & 3 projects

- the Mediterranean Office for Youth (label awarded for 2 masters)

- the French “Initiative d’Excellence” programmes

The university has a science policy that is shaped by nearly 500 professors and research scholars. 30 teams are active in the principal academic disciplines, 7 cross-disciplinary areas, and 2 very broad thematic areas (Chemistry and Health) Several laboratories are mixed units supported by two of France's national research bodies, CNRS and INSERM. The university has made a commitment to certain priority sectors related to three broad themes: Optics and Vision; Sports and Health technology; and Space, Change, Innovation, and Society.

== Ranking ==
University rankings

Global – Overall
- CWUR World: = 787 (2019)

The Centre for World University Ranking has ranked the university as 787 worldwide.

== Notable people ==
Faculty

- Jean-Luc Perrot (born 1959, in Moulins, Allier) - organist, carillonneur, composer and musicologist
- Frédéric Regard (born 1959) - English Literature
- Ulrich Pfeil (born 1966, in Heide, Germany) - historian
- Abdou Kolley (born 1970) - economist and politician, Gambia

Alumni

- Essaï Altounian (born 1980, in Paris) - French-Armenian singer, songwriter, keyboardist, music producer and actor
- Joëlle Bergeron (born 1949, in Charlieu) - politician and MEP
- Denis Serre (born 1954, in Nancy, France) - mathematician
- Alioune Badara Cissé (1958-2021) - politician, Senegal
- Abdou Kolley (born 1970) - economist and politician, Gambia
- Souad Kassim Mohamed (born 1976), Djiboutian linguist

Honorary degree recipients

- Guy Berthiaume (born 1950) - Librarian and Archivist of Canada

== See also ==
- List of public universities in France by academy
- University of Lyon
- European University Association
- Coimbra Group
- Hubert Curien Laboratory
