= Mascarenhas =

Mascarenhas may refer to:

- Mascarenhas (surname), people named Mascarenhas
- Mascarenhas (footballer), Domingos António da Silva (1937–2015), Angolan footballer
- Mascarenhas, a civil parish of Mirandela, Portugal
- Mascarenhas Islands, or Mascarene Islands, an archipelago in the Indian Ocean

== See also ==
- Mascarenhasia, a plant genus
