= Francisco Mascarenhas =

Francisco Mascarenhas may refer to:

- Francisco de Mascarenhas (1530–1608), Portuguese count
- Francisco Mascarenhas (Governor of Macau), Portuguese nobleman who governed Macau from 1623 to 1626
- Francisco Mascarenhas (footballer) (born 2000), Portuguese footballer
