= The Death of Polydorus =

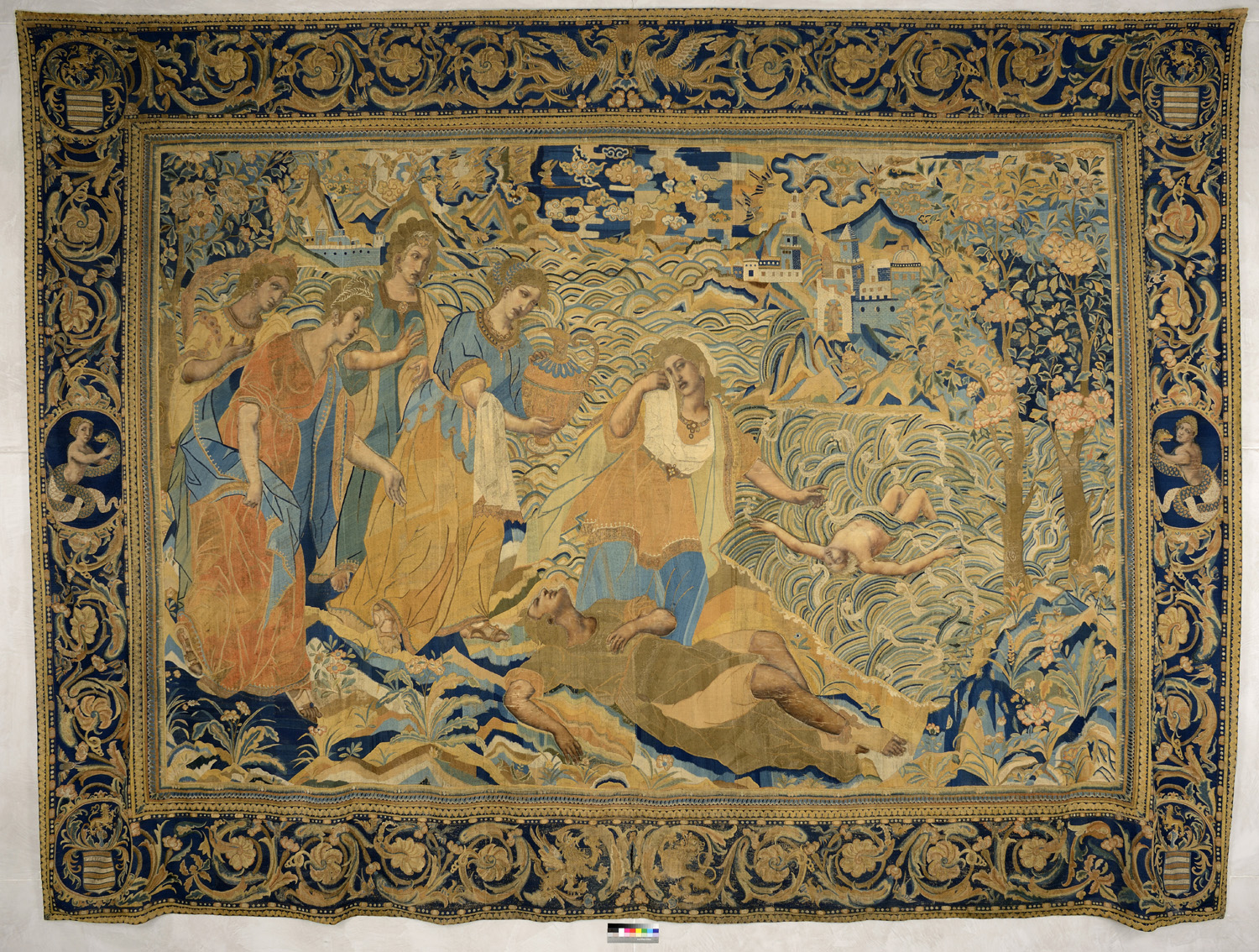
The Death of Polydorus, 1620s

The Death of Polydorus is one of a set of seven tapestries known as The Story of Troy showing a scene from the Iliad by Homer, here the death of Priam's son Polydorus in book VI, link 290 and book XXIV, line 49. It was produced between 1623 and 1626 and is now in the Museum of Fine Arts of Lyon, as is The Vengeance of Hecuba, also from the set (an interior scene whose Chinese motifs are less prominent).

They are technically embroidery rather than being in a tapestry weave, but the images of the faces and flesh parts of the figures are appliqué painted silk satin pieces, reflecting a Chinese technique often used for Buddhist banners. The painting may have been done by Western artists, possibly in Europe. It measures 3.7 by 4.9 metres.

It was commissioned from a Chinese manufacturer, presumably in or near Macao, during the last years of the Ming dynasty by Francisco Mascarenhas, Portuguese governor of the Portuguese Macao from 1623 to 1626, since the medallions bear a female serpent and there is a lion a shield in each corner, the Mascarenhas family arms.

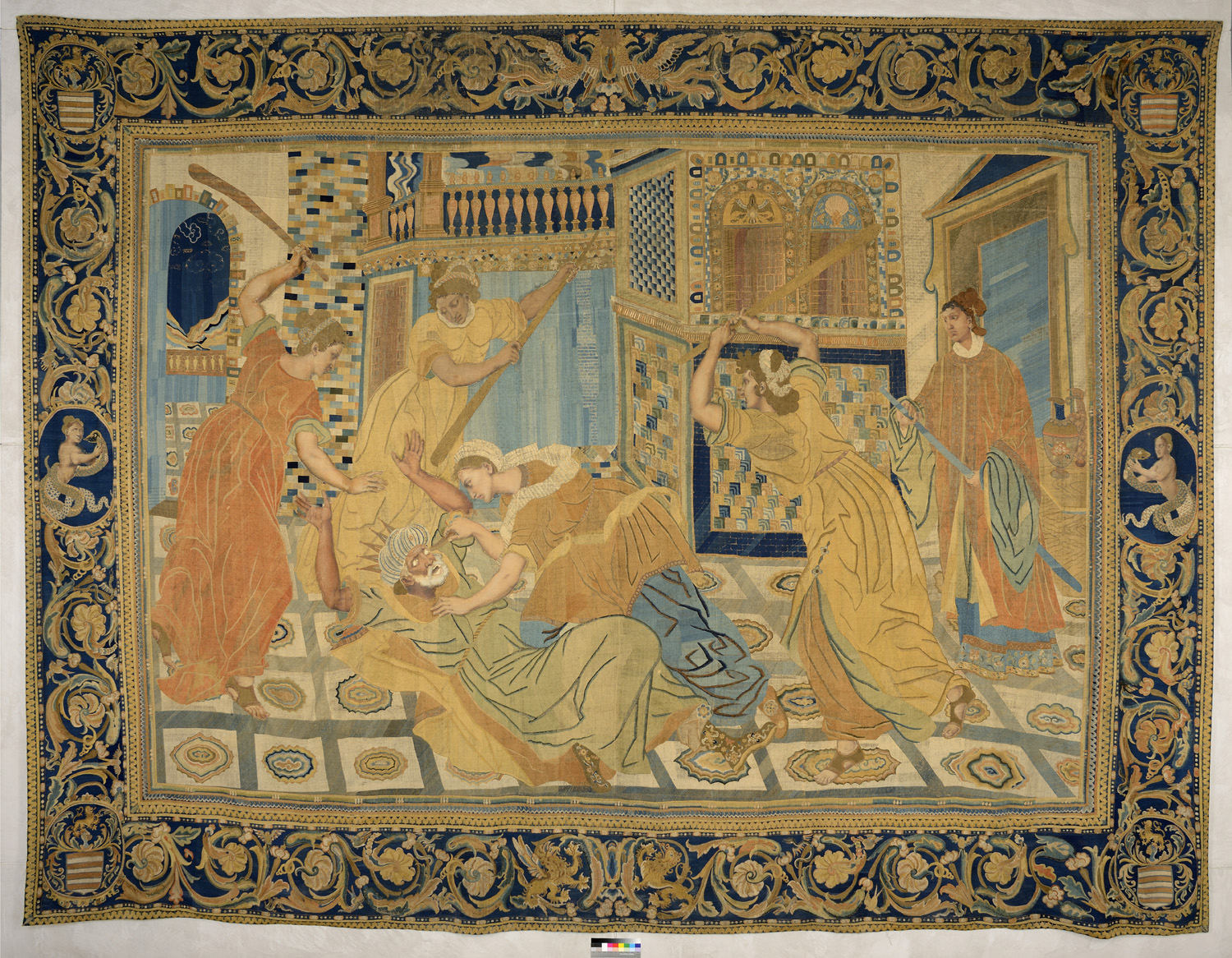
The Vengeance of Hecuba from the same set.

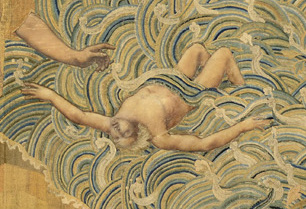
Detail, with Chinese-style waves

The unusual style at first glance resembles a European tapestry of the period, and elements of the composition are drawn from European prints. The landscape, water and sky use Chinese motifs and conventions. The piece uses cotton, wool, silk, and gold thread.
