= Teschemacher =

Teschemacher is a surname. Notable people with the surname include:

- Edward Teschemacher (1876–1940), American lyricist and popular music composer
- Frank Teschemacher (1906-1932), American jazz clarinetist and alto-saxophonist
- Henry F. Teschemacher (1823-1904), American mayor of San Francisco
- James Englebert Teschemacher (1790-1853), English scientist
- Margarete Teschemacher (1903-1959), German operatic soprano
