= The Story of Troy =

17th C. embroidered tapestries

The Story of Troy is a set of seven embroidered tapestries illustrating stories about the Trojan War made by Ming Chinese artisans of Macau in the 1620s. All of the tapestries are connected by a common border design containing Portuguese patterns a pair of phoenixes at the top, a lion and griffin at the bottom, and a triton and serpent on each side. The four corners of each tapestry are adorned with the same coat of arms, identified as an erroneous depiction of the family crest of Francisco Mascarenhas, the first governor of Macau. It is believed, if the identification proves correct, that Mascarenhas commissioned the tapestries to emphasize the legitimacy of the Portuguese presence in Asia represented by Macau after an unsuccessful Dutch attempt to take the city. There are doubts about this identification, however, since it is not known if Mascarenhas would have accepted a product with the wrong family crests, though there are Jingdezhen porcelain bearing inaccurate crests positively attributed to Francisco Mascarenhas.

Despite the classic Western theme, the series of tapestries are laden with Chinese motifs—such as the clouds and waves depicted in the Chinese style, and the presence of lychee, a fruit not native to Europe—reflecting the significant involvement and degree of freedom the Chinese embroiderers had in the work. The hangings make use of cotton, wool, silk, and gold thread, but at some point the gold threads were stripped away for the flesh parts of the figures and replaced with silk satin pieces painted in the Western style. An analysis of the paint revealed that the blue-green pigments were of the type that was often used in European contexts, but not in Asia; conversely, the white pigments from the work were often found in Asian contexts (specifically Japanese) but not European ones. This suggests that the painted portions may have been the work of Chinese artists who had studied Western painting under the Jesuits in Japan, such as Ni Yicheng (倪一誠; christened as Jacobe Niva) and You Wenhui (游文輝; christened as Emmanuel Pereira), students of Giovanni Niccolò.

Four tapestries of the set had belonged to the American art collector Henry G. Marquand until his death, upon which the tapestries were auctioned off. Of the original seven tapestries, three are now in the collection of the Metropolitan Museum of Art in New York, two are in the Museum of Fine Arts of Lyon, while one was considered to be in private hands until it reemerged in 2024 as an exhibit of the Poly MGM Museum in the MGM Macau casino resort. One remains unaccounted for, being last seen in a 1934 auction in Florence.

== The tapestries ==
Illustration and title	Dimensions	Collection	Notes
The Abduction of Helen	362.6 × 487.7 cm	Metropolitan Museum of Art, New York	Based on a woodcut by Bernard Salomon, the piece shows Helen being carried off her feet in the midst of battle away from her husband Menelaus, reflecting a post-classical depiction of the story such as those followed by the school of Marcantonio Raimondi.
The Prophecy of Calchas	374.7 × 497.8 cm	Metropolitan Museum of Art, New York	A scene from the beginning of the Trojan War, where Greek troops gather in Aulis and the seer Calchas offers his prophecy for smooth winds for the voyage to Troy.
Ajax and Ulysses Disputing	—	Unknown	Believed to be depicting the feud between Ajax and Odysseus for the right to claim the armour of Achilles for themselves, this tapestry has not been located since it was sold in the Florentine art market in 1934.
Aeneas and Anchises	370 × 405 cm	Poly MGM Museum, Macau	Also known as Aeneas Escaping from Troy, the work shows a scene from the Aeneid where Aeneas carries his father Anchises away from the burning city of Troy.
The Sacrifice of Polyxena	381 × 523.2 cm	Metropolitan Museum of Art, New York	Polyxena kneels as she is about to be sacrificed to her dead lover Achilles, a scene that does not feature in the Homeric epics but later myths of the Trojan War. Behind her is a seemingly Chinese tree.
The Death of Polydorus	369.5 × 489 cm	Museum of Fine Arts of Lyon, Lyon	Illustrates the scene from the aftermath of the Trojan War, where Hecuba finds her son Polydorus's body washing onto shore. The cities of Macau and Lisbon feature in the background, with the latter represented by Belém Tower and the Jerónimos Monastery.
The Vengeance of Hecuba	369.5 × 489 cm	Museum of Fine Arts of Lyon, Lyon	Hecuba, accompanied by her handmaidens, takes revenge on her son's killer Polymestor by gorging out his eyes.

== See also ==
- The Great History of Troy tapestries (Painted Chamber, Westminster Palace)
