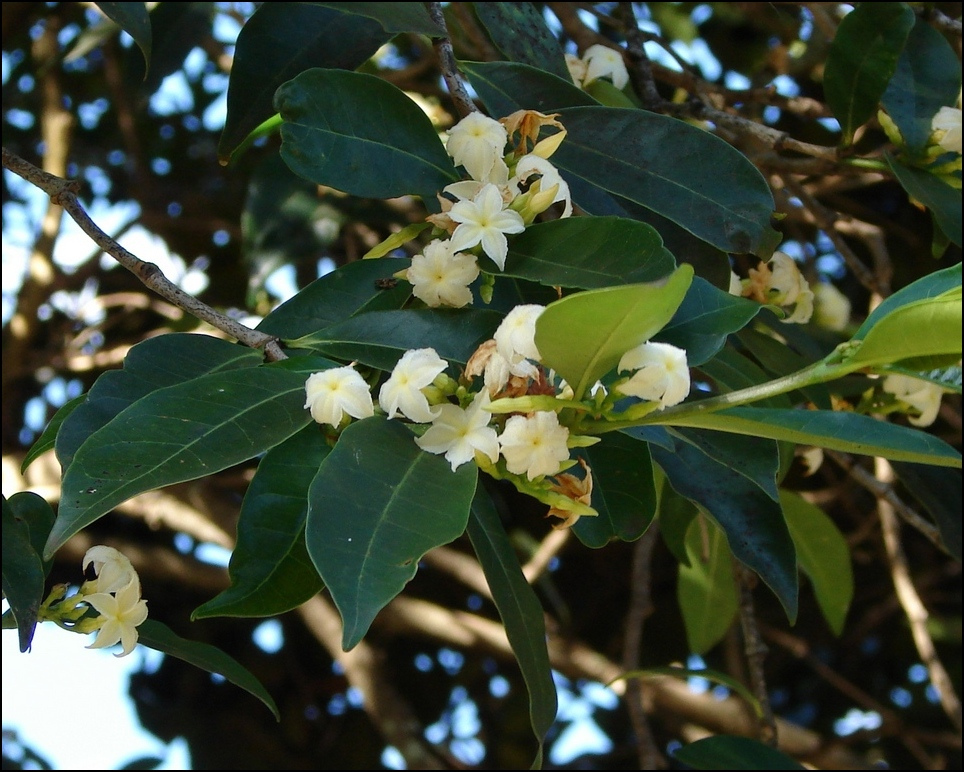
- Mascarenhasia arborescens

Scientific classification
- Kingdom: Plantae
- Clade: Tracheophytes
- Clade: Angiosperms
- Clade: Eudicots
- Clade: Asterids
- Order: Gentianales
- Family: Apocynaceae
- Tribe: Malouetieae
- Genus: Mascarenhasia; A.DC.

Synonyms
- Echitella Pichon; Lanugia N.E.Br.

= Mascarenhasia =

Genus of plants

Mascarenhasia is a genus of plant in family Apocynaceae first described as a genus in 1844. It is native to Africa and a few islands in the Indian Ocean. Several species are endemic to Madagascar.

Species

1. Mascarenhasia arborescens A.DC. - Kenya, Tanzania, Zaire, Malawi, Mozambique, Zimbabwe, Comoros, Madagascar; naturalized in Seychelles
2. Mascarenhasia havetii A.DC. - Madagascar
3. Mascarenhasia lanceolata A.DC. - Madagascar
4. Mascarenhasia lisianthiflora A.DC. - Madagascar
5. Mascarenhasia macrosiphon Baker - Madagascar
6. Mascarenhasia rubra Jum. & H.Perrier - Madagascar
7. Mascarenhasia speciosa Scott-Elliot - Madagascar
8. Mascarenhasia tampinensis Pichon - Madagascar
