= Francisco Mascarenhas (governor of Macau) =

Portuguese nobleman, Governor of Macau 1623–1626

Governor of Macau
- In office 1623–1626
- Monarch: Filipe III
- Succeeded by: Filipe Lobo

Personal details
- Born: Portugal
- Spouse: Margarida de Vilhena
- Parent(s): Nuno Mascarenhas and Isabel de Castro

Chinese name
- Traditional Chinese: 馬士加路也
- Simplified Chinese: 马士加路也
Transcriptions
Yue: Cantonese
- Jyutping: maa5 si6 gaa1 lou6 jaa5

Francisco Mascarenhas was a Portuguese fidalgo who served as the first Captain-General and Governor of Macau from 1623 to 1626. Before Mascarenhas, the Portuguese settlement of Macau on the coast of China was under the authority of the Captain-major of the Japan Voyage and the Macau Senate, the latter of which resisted the powers invested in the new governor. The conflict between Mascarenhas and the entrenched powers of Macau was such that the city erupted in rebellion against him on 10 October 1624, though this uprising proved to be short-lived.

== Early life and career ==
Francisco Mascarenhas was born into the noble Mascarenhas family as the son of Nuno Mascarenhas and Isabel de Castro. He married his niece Margarida de Vilhena, daughter of João Mascarenhas.

Two of his siblings had died in the service of Portugal against the Dutch in the waters of Malacca in 1606, but he himself did not travel to the East until 18 March 1622, when he, as captain of the ship São Joseph, accompanied the fleet of Francisco da Gama, great-grandson of Vasco da Gama, on his way to Goa as the new Viceroy of Portuguese India. On the way there, the fleet was defeated by a combined Anglo-Dutch fleet off Mozambique in July. Mascarenhas did not participate in the action as he was down with a fever at the time and had to be carried ashore in the midst of battle. He and the fleet managed to recover from the setback and continued their voyage to Goa, arriving in the city on 6 May 1623. Once there, Mascarenhas was immediately assigned to be the governor of Macau.

== Governor of Macau ==
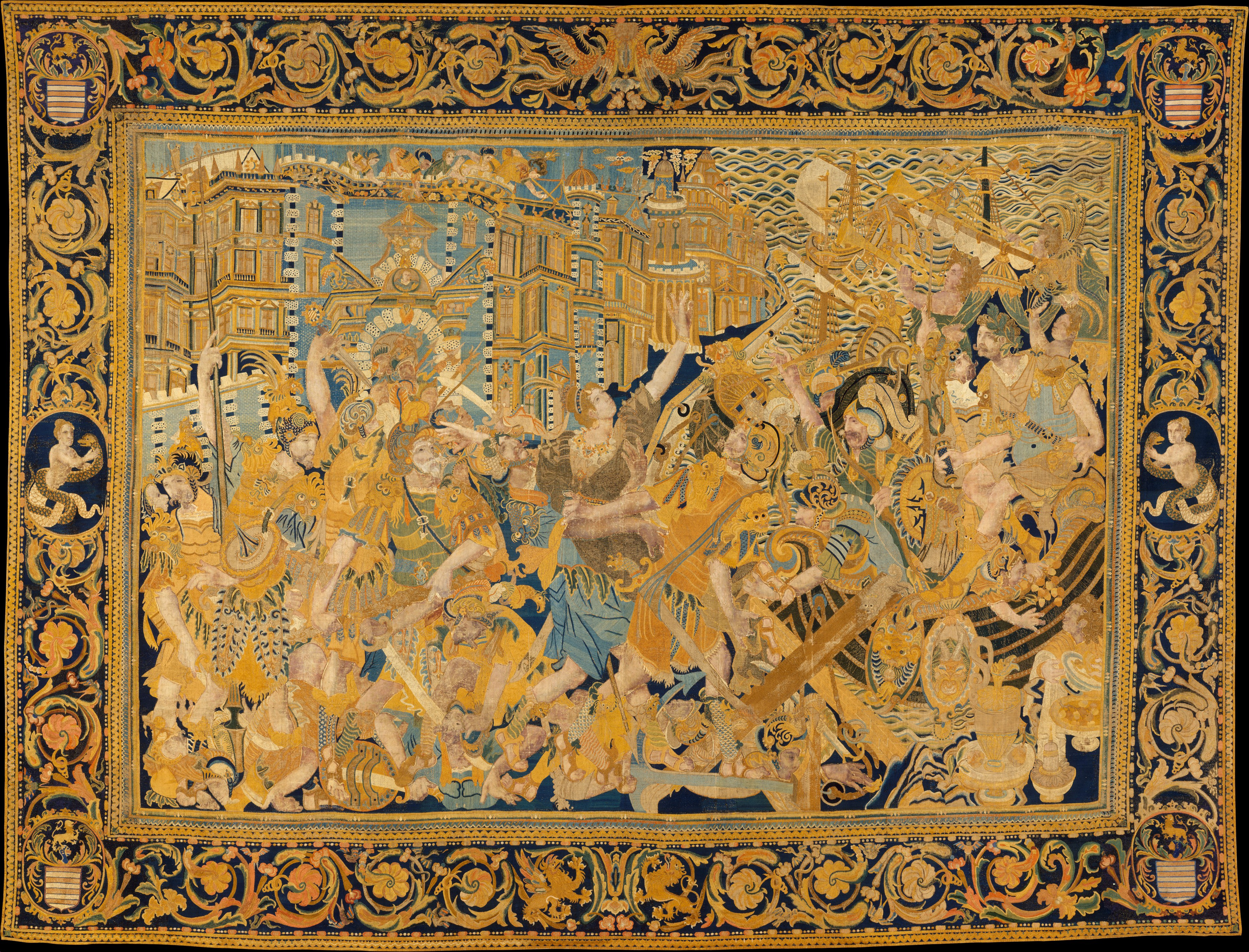
The Abduction of Helen from The Story of Troy tapestries, believed to be commissioned by Francisco Mascarenhas

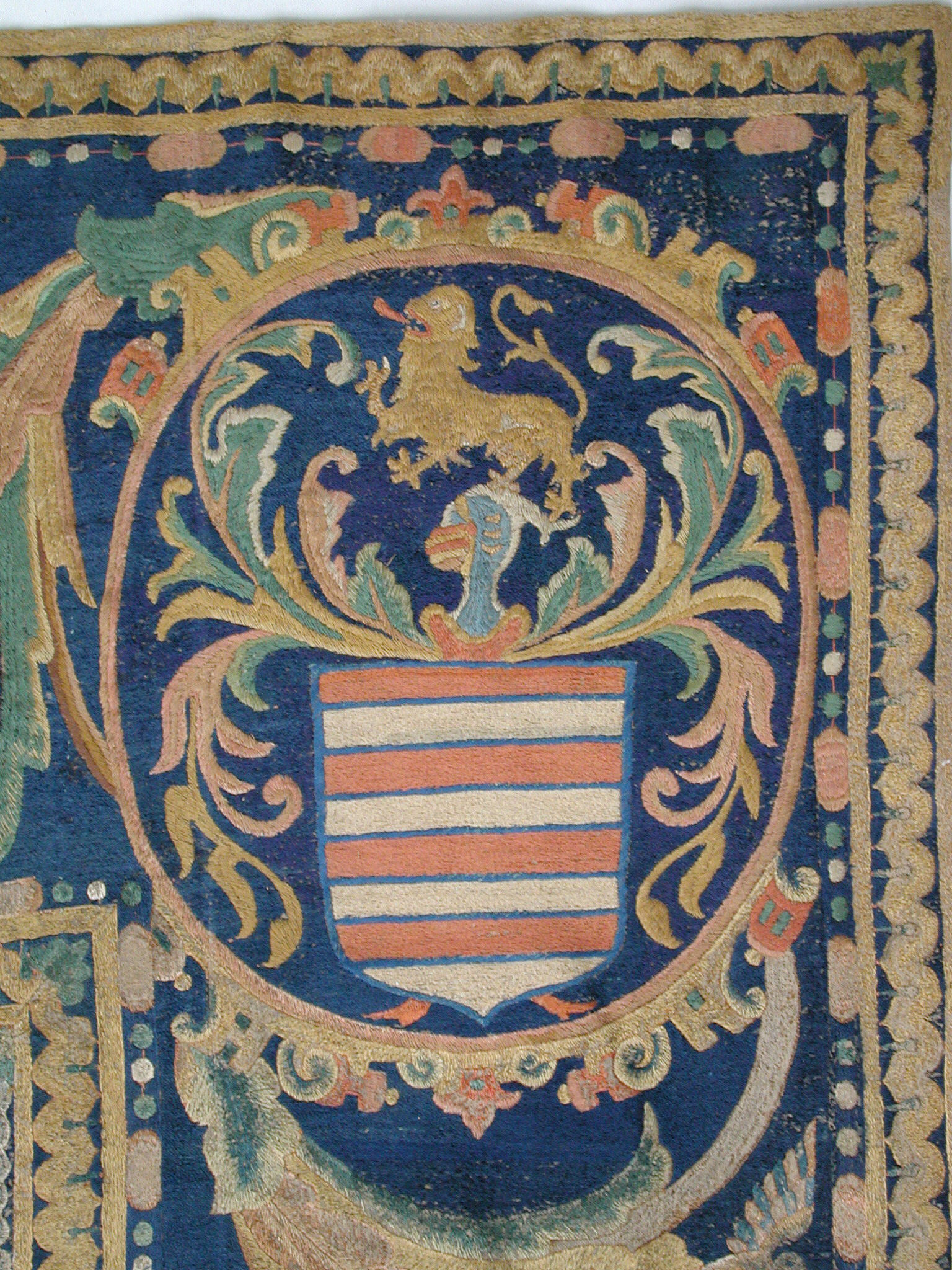
Detail of the (erroneous) Mascarenhas family crest from The Abduction of Helen

Since 1557, the Cantonese mandarins of the Ming dynasty had allowed the Portuguese to settle in what became known as the city of Macau. In time, the city grew into an important staging ground for the lucrative Japan voyage, a trade route terminating in Nagasaki monopolized by the Portuguese from the late 16th to early 17th century. The new city had no governor at the beginning, instead, power was shared between the Captain-major of the Japan Voyage—who had supreme authority while he was in the city—and the Macau Senate representing local Portuguese interests. Due to the Dutch invasion of Macau in 1622, the Senate, who had long resisted challenges to their local authority, became convinced that Macau needed a permanent paramount military figure and petitioned the Viceroy of India for a captain-general to be installed in Macau. The viceroy agreed, and Mascarenhas was to become Macau's first captain-general and governor with full powers over Macau.

Francisco Mascarenhas took office in Macau on 17 July 1623. The Senate was aghast to find out that the viceroy had invested in him supreme authority over the city, including the power to fill all vacant official posts himself and the power to arrest and send to Goa everyone he finds "riotous, mutinous, or disturbers of the peace." The Senate petitioned to deprive Mascarenhas of these powers to no avail, and Mascarenhas, for his part, set about imposing his authority on the city in opposition to the local headmen in Macau.

The first significant conflict between Mascarenhas and the Macanese elites concerned the appointment of the replacement for João Pinto da Piedade as Bishop of Macau. Mascarenhas supported the Dominican candidate António do Rosário while the Senate and the local Jesuits backed Diogo Correia Valente. The diocesan feud between the two parties turned increasingly violent, with priests being beaten on the streets and muskets being fired on both sides, ultimately escalating to a point where the Jesuits shot three cannonballs through the St. Augustine's Church where Mascarenhas had been staying. Mascarenhas reportedly had the cannonballs gilded and sent one each to the viceroy and the king, keeping the last one for himself. The ecclesiastical authorities in Goa eventually ruled in favour of Rosário as acting bishop in 1624.

Mascarenhas initiated many reforms. He introduced measures to curb the influence of the merchants by banning them from earning silver from high interest sea loans, with the knock-on effect being that Macao merchants slowed their investments to the Japanese in Nagasaki, much to the latter's chagrin. He instituted a system that made sure the revenue collected from the Japan voyages went to the king of Portugal. He also ran a census on the city in 1625, revealing that the male Portuguese population numbered 437 and male creoles numbered 403. (The number of women and other races were not recorded.)

To better defend the city against further Dutch attacks, he built walls and fortifications around the city. However, Chinese authorities intervened, objecting to the fortifications facing mainland China. After some negotiation, it was decided that 22,000 taels of silver were to be paid annually from the Portuguese to the provincial authorities in Guangdong for the constructions to be allowed to continue, and that the fortress at Patane aimed at the mainland had to be dismantled. Mascarenhas also established the city's gun foundry in 1623, which was renowned for the quality of its cannons under the supervision of Manuel Tavares Bocarro, future governor of Macau.

Discontent against Mascarenhas reached a point that the city rose up in rebellion against him on 10 October 1624. Local tradition have it that Mascarenhas was killed by an angry mob on this occasion, or that he fled back to India on a ship, but the reality is that he quickly quashed the rebellion and stayed as governor until the end of his term in July 1626. He granted an amnesty to the mutineers 4 days later, which was confirmed by the viceroy in an unconditional pardon in 1626.

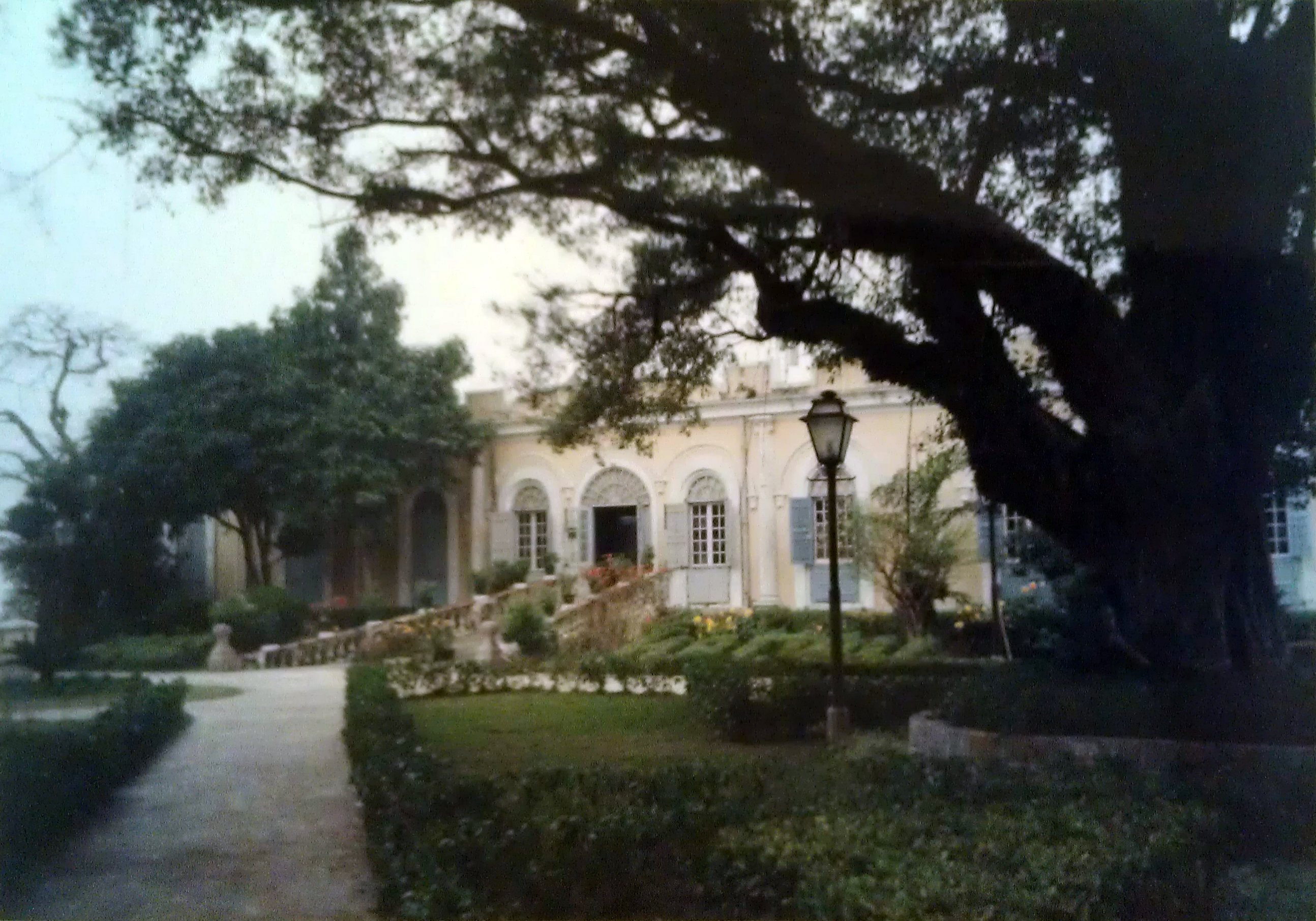
The Fortaleza do Monte that became the governor's residence

Three months after the revolt, Mascarenhas, dissatisfied with his dwellings which he felt to be unbefitting of his station, took control of the Jesuit mountaintop fortress Fortaleza do Monte. He did this through a ruse, first by asking the Jesuit priests to let him into the citadel to have a general view of the city, then he had his personal retinue of soldiers filter into the fort gradually. At nightfall, when the Jesuits informed Mascarenhas that the gates were about to close for the night, Mascarenhas instead evicted them, declaring that the gates would be open again the next morning in the king's name. In this manner the Fortaleza do Monte became the governor's residence, an arrangement that lasted until 1749.

According to heraldry experts, it is likely that Francisco Mascarenhas commissioned the set of seven tapestries known as The Story of Troy from local Chinese workshops while he was the Governor of Macau. The tapestries, representing a classic Western theme (The Trojan War) with Chinese characteristics, are now in the collections of museums such as the Metropolitan Museum of Art in New York, the Museum of Fine Arts of Lyon, and the Poly MGM Museum in Macau.

== Later career ==
When his term in office ended in July 1626, Mascarenhas handed over the governorship of Macau to his successor Felipe Lobo and he sailed back to Europe by way of Goa. During the last leg of the journey in 1627, the authorities at Madrid, unaware that he was coming back to Europe, appointed Mascarenhas as Governor of India. Mascarenhas left Europe again in April 1628 to take this new position, however, contrary winds off the coast of Guinea forced his return. While returning to Lisbon, he caught the nobleman Francisco Pereira Pinto in the act of sodomy and had him burned at the stake in what C. R. Boxer calls "the only instance of an auto-da-fé at sea". This controversial act and the victim's social standing caused Mascarenhas to be imprisoned for a short time while the matter was being investigated, and although he was found to have done no wrong, he was not appointed as Governor of India again. Instead, he was given a position on the Council of Portugal in Madrid. At the outbreak of the Portuguese Restoration War in 1640, he sought to return to Portugal and was thrown into prison for several months as a result. He returned to Lisbon upon his release, where he was assigned to the Council of State by John IV of Portugal. Mascarenhas is credited as an early introducer of the Chinese sweet orange into Europe when he brought orange trees directly from China back to his quinta garden in Xabregas of Lisbon in 1635.

New title	Governor of Macau; 1623–1626	Succeeded by Filipe Lobo
