= Mascarenhas (surname) =

The original coat of arms of the Mascarenhas family.

Mascarenhas (Brazilian Portuguese: [maskaˈɾeɲɐs], European Portuguese: [mɐʃkɐˈɾeɲɐʃ]) is a habitational name taken from the freguesia (civil parish & municipality) of Mascarenhas in the city of Mirandela, Portugal. This name is also found in Brazil, Spain, India (particularly in Goa, Mangalore and Tuticorin) and where it was taken by Portuguese colonists. Recently, this surname may be used by citizens of Australia, the United Kingdom and the United States. It may refer to these persons:

- Dimitri Mascarenhas, Sri Lankan British cricketer
- Francisco de Mascarenhas, 13th vice-regent of Portuguese controlled India, 1581–1584
- Francisco Mascarenhas, first governor of Macau, 1623–1626
- D. Fernando Martins Mascarenhas, Bishop of Faro (16th century)
- D. José de Mascarenhas da Silva e Lancastre, Duke of Aveiro & defendant in the Tavora Affair
- Mascarenhas de Moraes, Brazilian field marshal and commander of the Brazilian Expeditionary Force
- Mascarenhas, Portuguese footballer
- Neville Anthony Mascarenhas, Pakistani journalist and author
- Kate Mascarenhas, English novelist
- Pedro Mascarenhas, Portuguese explorer and colonial administrator
- António Mascarenhas Monteiro, Cape Verdean politician
- Rodrigo Mascarenhas, Cape Verdean basketball player
- Tuna Mascarenhas (1944–2009), Cape Verdean activist
- Brian Mascarenhas, Indian footballer
- Zaneta Mascarenhas, Indo-Australian engineer and politician

== Fictional characters ==
- Charlie Mascarenhas, a fictional character from the film Players
- Joseph Mascarenhas, fictional guitarist from the film Rock On!!

== See also ==
- Administrative divisions of Portugal
