= MGM Macau =

Hotel and casino in Macau, China

Coordinates: 22°11′9″N 113°32′50″E

- 美高梅 (Chinese)
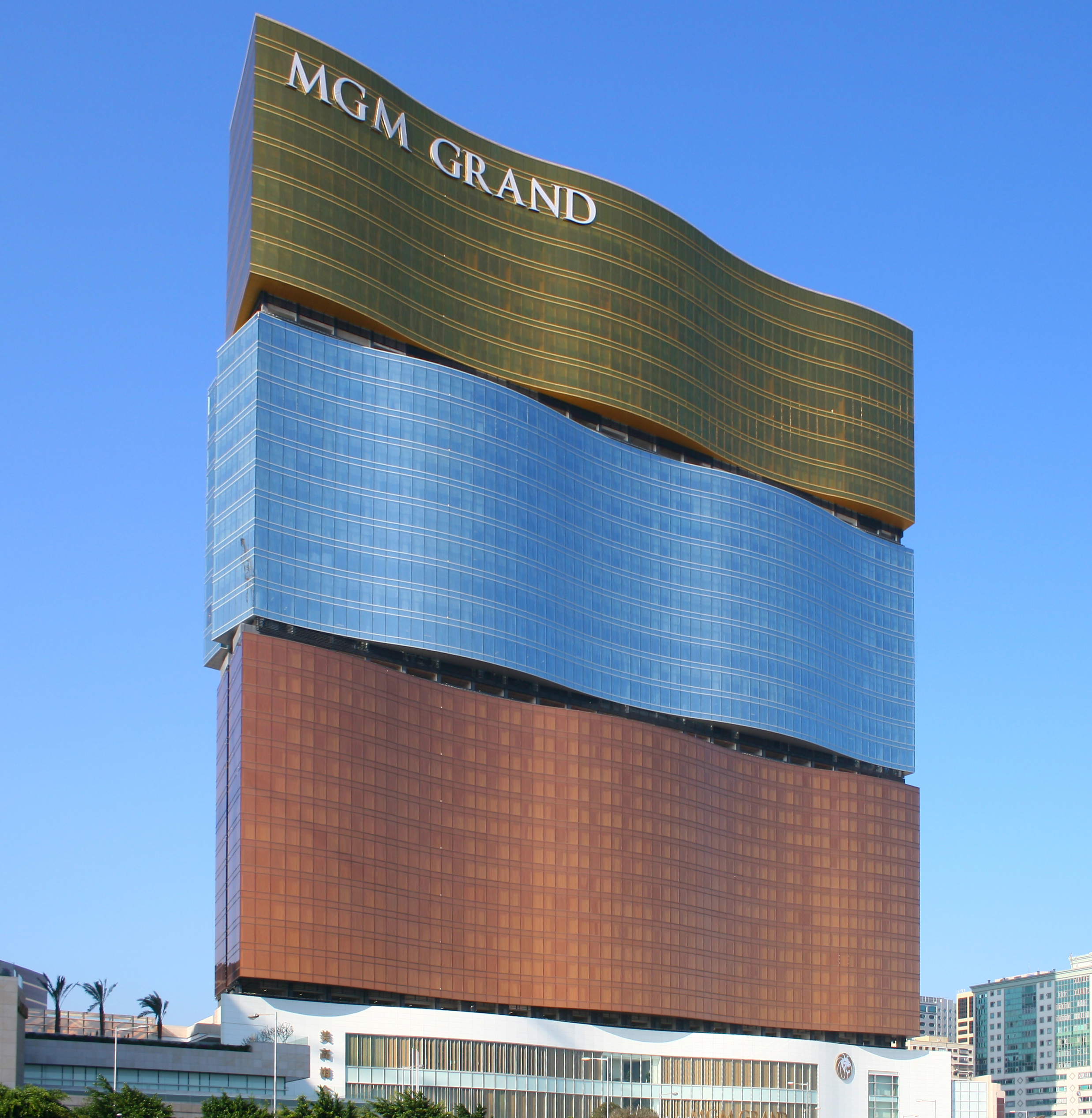
- MGM Macau
- Interactive map of MGM Macau
- Location: Sé, Macau; Avenida Dr. Sun Yat Sen
- Opened: 18 December 2007; 18 years ago
- No. of rooms: 597
- Gaming space: 100,000 sq ft
- Signature attractions: The Grande Praça; Poly MGM Museum
- Notable restaurants: Palette Dining Studio; Wolfgang Puck Cucina; Wolfgang Puck Steak; TAP
- Owner: MGM Resorts International
- Architect: Wong Tung & Partners

MGM Macau (Chinese: 美高梅; formerly known as MGM Grand Macau) is a 35-story, 600-room casino resort in Sé, Macau. Under a sub concession approved by the Macau government, the project is owned and operated as a 50-50 joint venture between MGM Resorts International and Pansy Ho, the daughter of Macau casino magnate Stanley Ho. The sub-concession is one of several examples of new casino construction following the end of the government-granted monopoly held for decades by Stanley Ho.

== History ==
The MGM Grand Macau was opened on 18 December 2007 at a cost of US $1.25 billion.

The property was renamed to MGM Macau, as part of MGM Mirage's 2010 rebranding to MGM Resorts International.

On 18 April 2011, an initial public offering was announced. Under the agreement, Pansy Ho would receive a 29 percent stake in the company, MGM China Holdings Ltd, which was created as a listing vehicle for the IPO. MGM Resorts would hold 51 percent and the public would receive 20 percent. The company raised US $1.5 billion from its IPO on the Hong Kong Stock Exchange at the top price of the range.

== Facilities ==
The property includes a convention space of 1,452 m^{2} (15,630 sq ft), including an area known as the Grand Ballroom spanning 807 m^{2} (8,690 sq ft) for business meetings, social events, and weddings. Additionally, it partners with Six Senses Spa to offer a space of 2,720 m^{2} (29,300 sq ft) that includes 12 treatment areas.

Soon after Wynn Macau's expansion plans became public, the MGM Macau announced its own plans for expansion, only weeks after the project was publicly launched. The expansion added 4,400 m^{2} (47,000 sq ft) to the casino floor's 2nd level.

=== Poly MGM Museum ===
Poly MGM Museum, a museum jointly-established by MGM and the Chinese state-owned Poly Culture Group, opened on the second floor of MGM Macau on November 2, 2024. The museum, nearly 2,000 square metres (22,000 sq ft) in space, was described to be "the first museum of international standing within an integrated resort across the Greater China region". The inaugural exhibition themed around the Maritime Silk Road features over 200 artifacts and pieces of artwork, including four of the Old Summer Palace bronze heads and the 17th-century Chinese tapestry Aeneas and Anchises, part of The Story of Troy set.

== Gallery ==
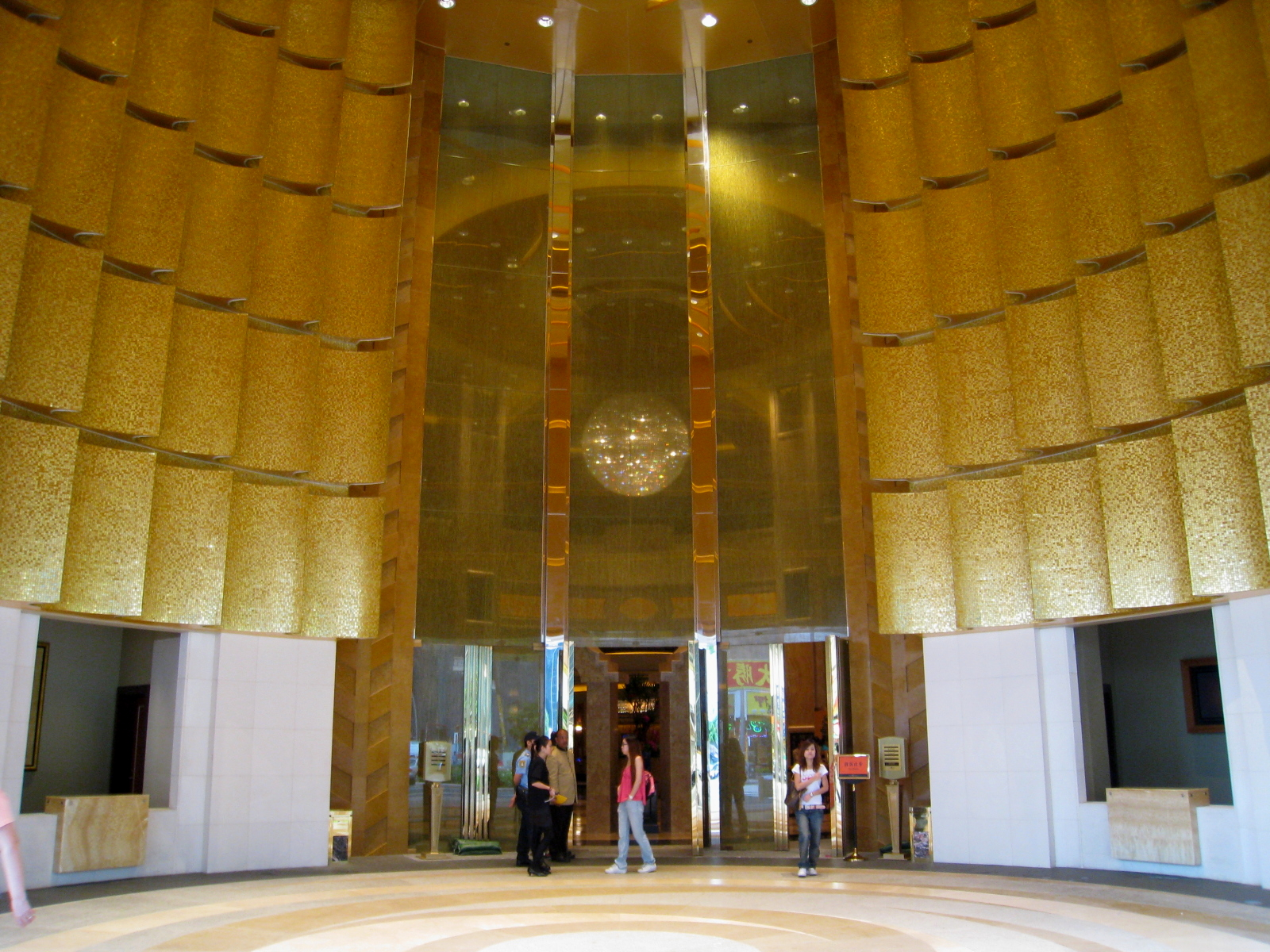
MGM Macau main entrance

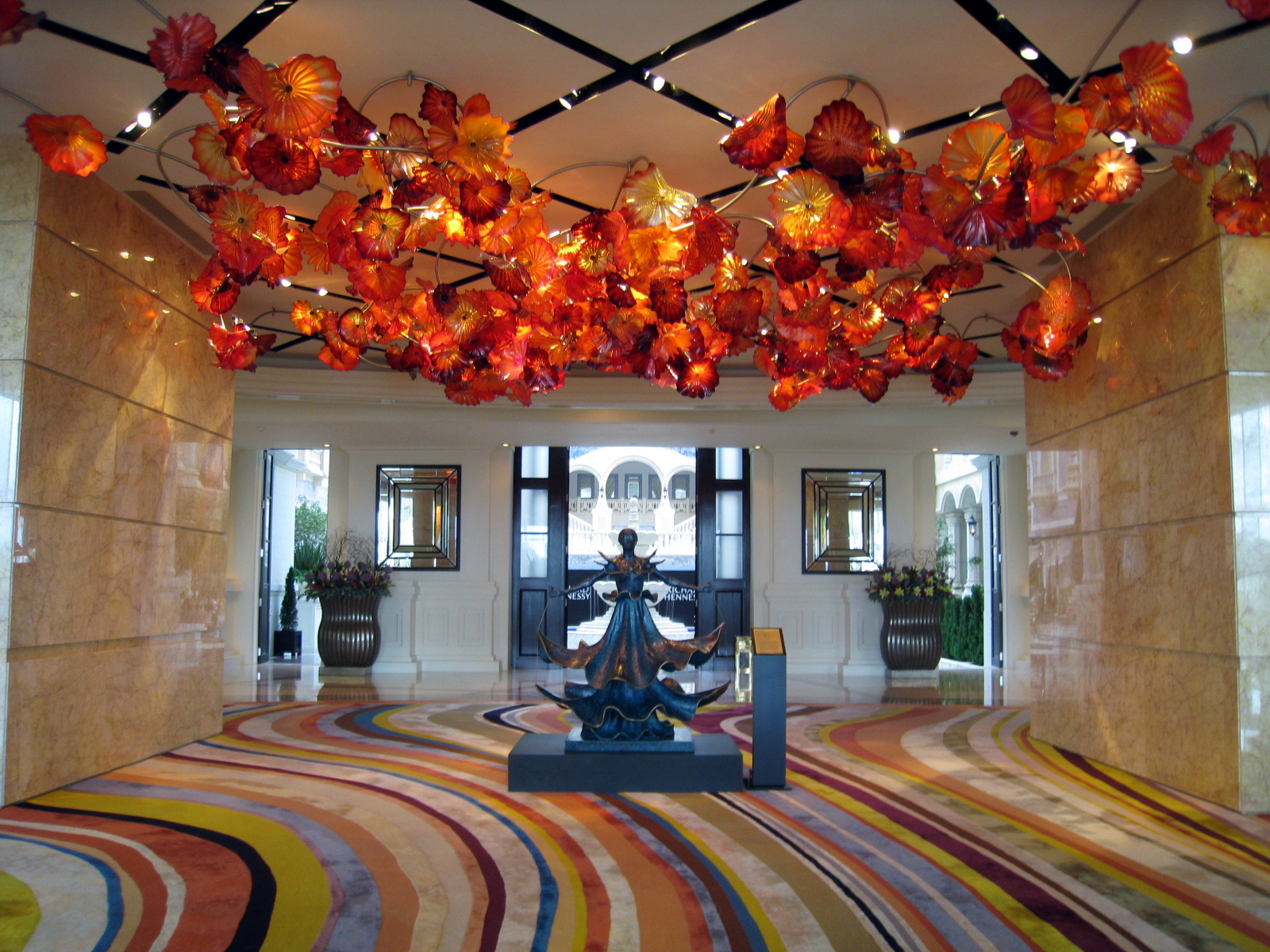
MGM Macau hotel lobby interior

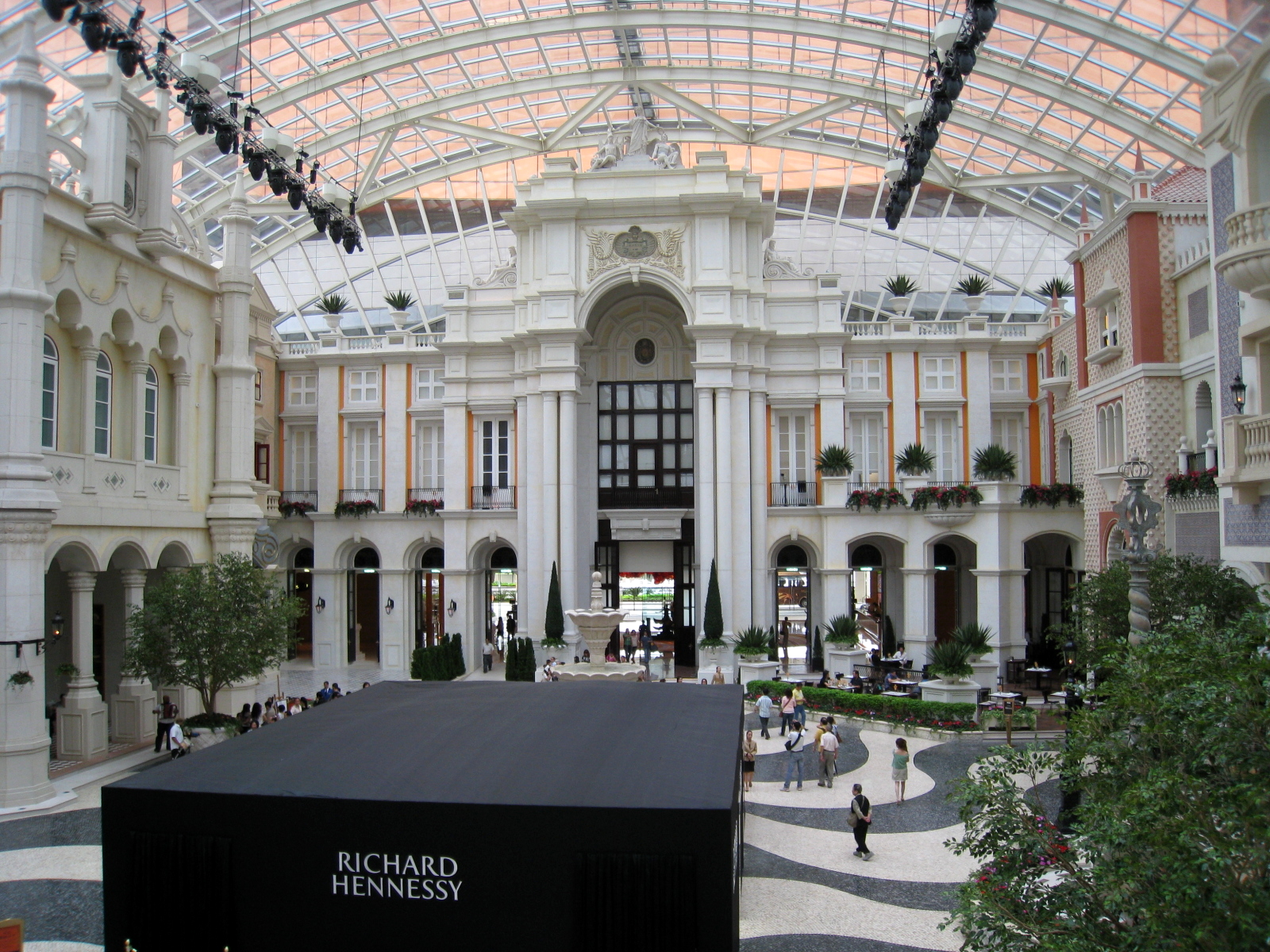
The Grande Praça at MGM Macau

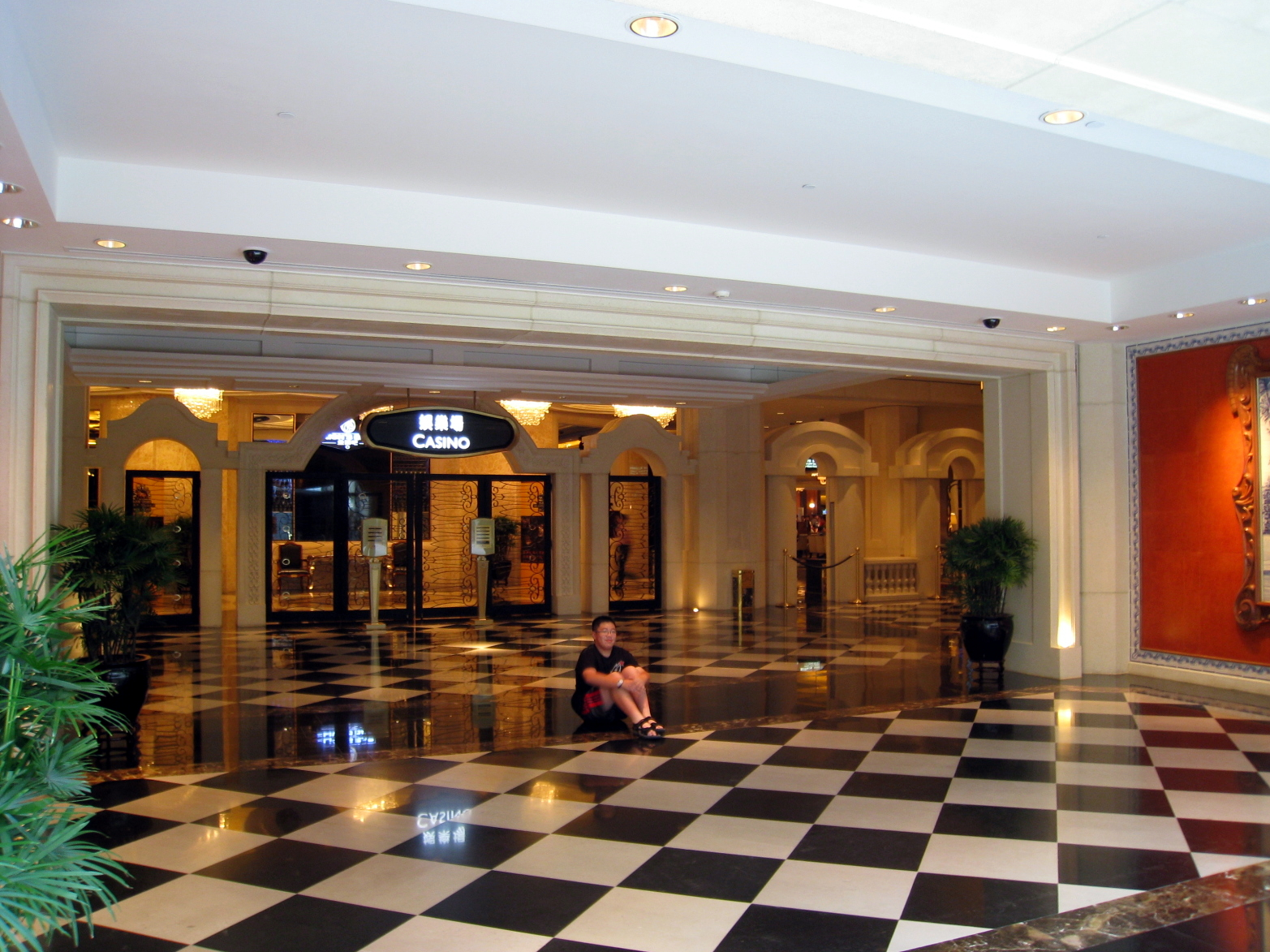
MGM Macau access to casino

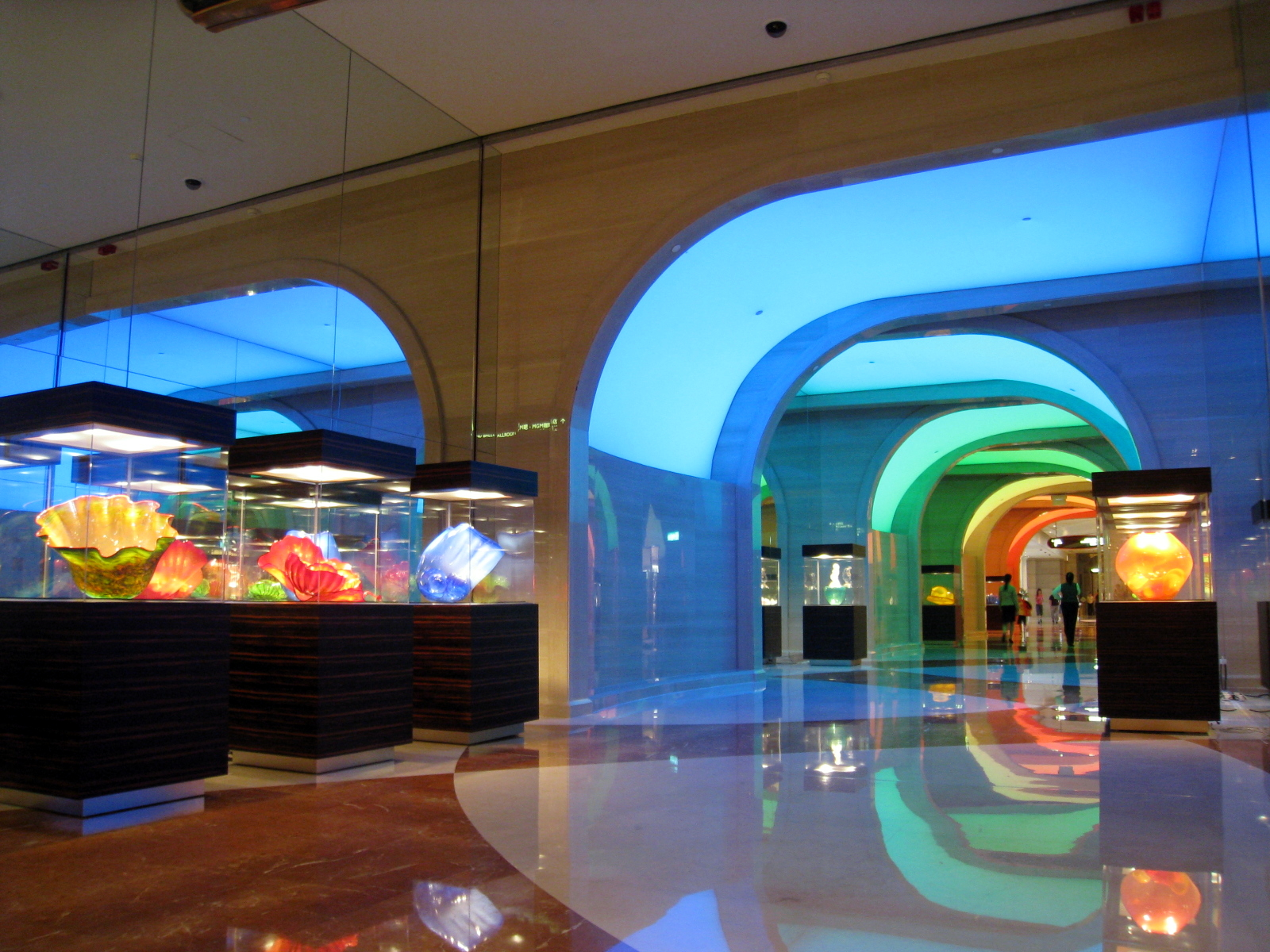
MGM Macau access

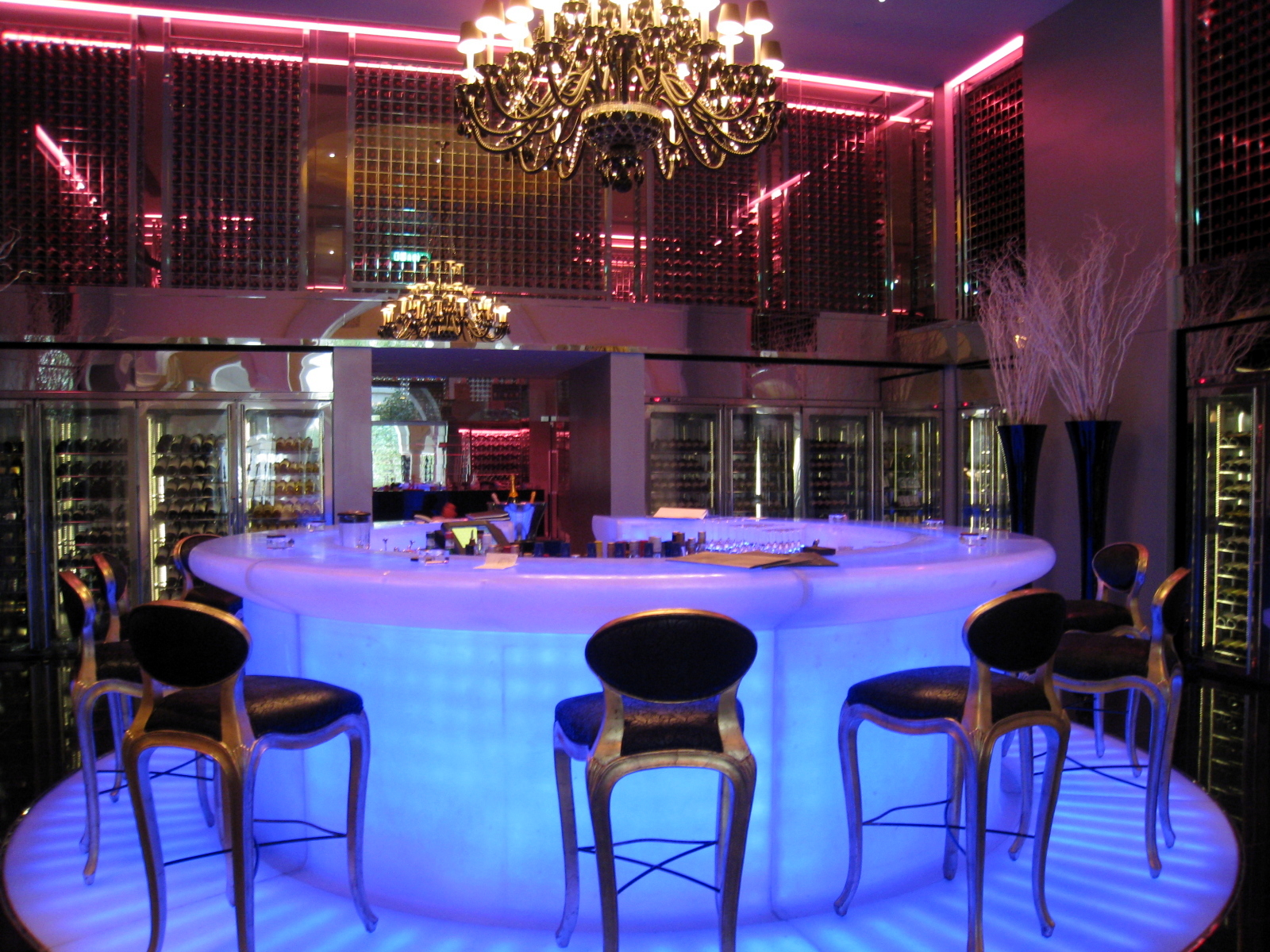
MGM Macau champagne bar

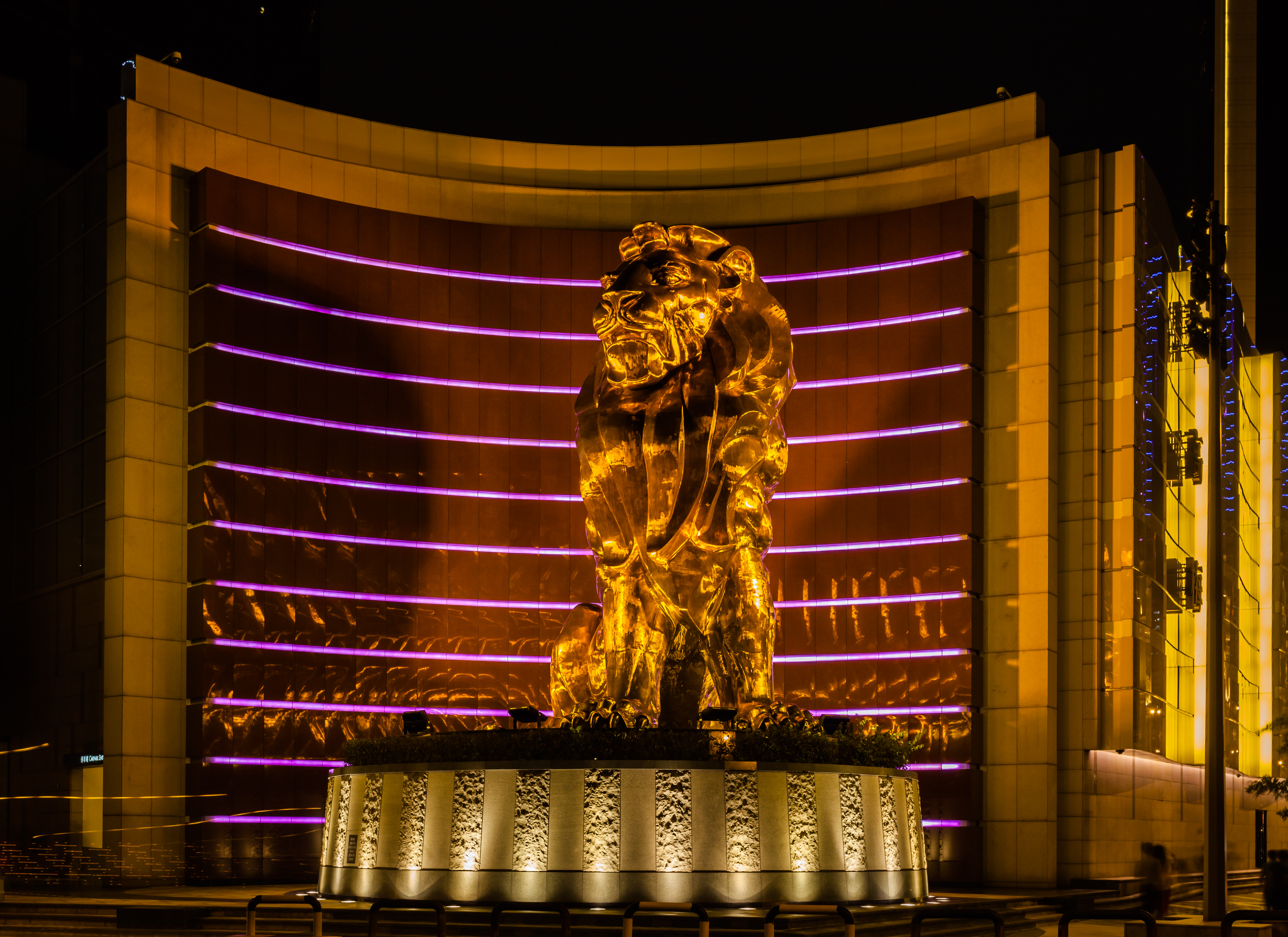
MGM Macau exterior

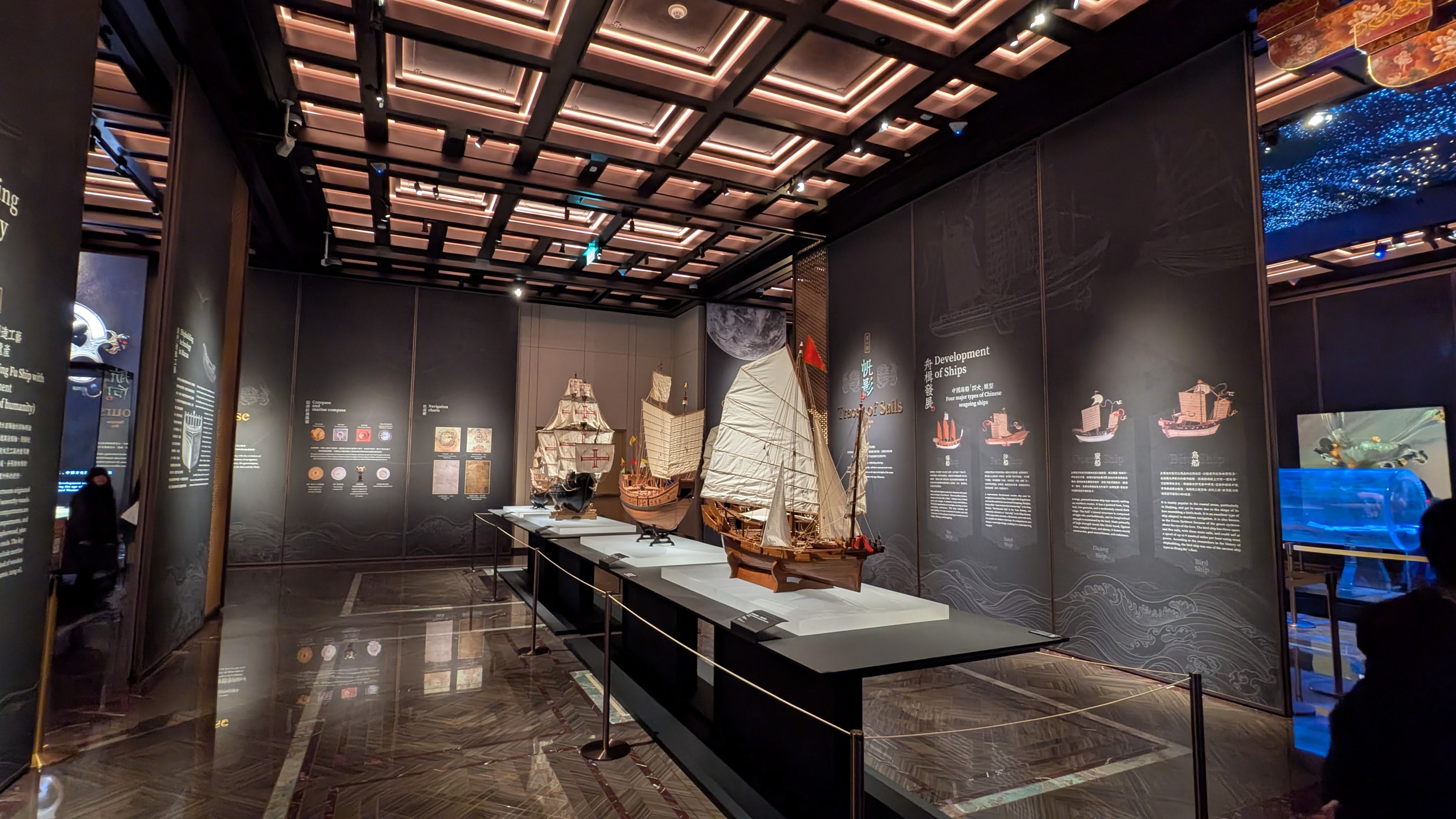
Poly MGM Museum

== See also ==
- MGM Cotai
- Gambling in Macau
- List of integrated resorts
