= James Englebert Teschemacher =

James Englebert Teschemacher (11 June 1790 in Nottingham, England – 9 November 1853 near Boston, Massachusetts) was a scientist. He began a commercial career in 1804 by entering a foreign mercantile house in London, where he showed business talents of a high order. In 1830 he accepted a lucrative offer to go to Cuba, but it proved unsatisfactory when he reached Havana, and he returned to England. He then determined to come to the United States, and reached New York City in February, 1832, after which he settled in Boston, where he engaged in commercial pursuits until his death. Teschemacher devoted his leisure to science, and published about thirty papers on various subjects in chemistry, mineralogy, geology, and botany. These appeared chiefly in the transactions of scientific societies of which he was a member. Besides several addresses, he published Concise Application of the Principles of Structural Botany to Horticulture (Boston, 1840); Essay on Guano (1845); and a translation of Julius Adolph Stöckhardt's Chemical Field Lectures (Cambridge, 1852). He was elected a Fellow of the American Academy of Arts and Sciences in 1841.
