= Tourism in Macau =

Tourism is a major industry in Macau. It is famous for the blend of Portuguese and Chinese cultures and its gambling industry, which includes Casino Lisboa, Macau, Sands Macau, The Venetian Macao, and Wynn Macau.

Macau is known as the “Monte Carlo of the Orient” and the “Las Vegas of the East”, which is attributed to the large volume of casinos that are found within the city. In fact, Macau is the only location in China where gambling is legal, and as such, gambling tourism is the city’s greatest source of revenue, and, the greatest revenue from gambling generated in the world. Further to this, Macau also boasts a huge number of hotels, from budget to luxury, along with which comes a myriad of food options, activities and historical sights to explore. Given such a "densely populated small area, the flows of tourists to Macau have been impressive".

== Background ==
=== Governance and regulation ===
Tourism in Macau is managed and regulated by a governmental body named the Macao Government Tourism Office, currently headed by Maria Helena de Senna Fernandes.

=== Geography ===
Map of Macau

Due to land reclamation in Macau, the islands of Taipa, Cotai and Coloane are "more like one big island these days". Evident from its name, Cotai is located between Taipa and Coloane, created by infilling marsh in-between the two islands. Taipa is a popular destination, where tourists may choose to head to the narrow streets of old Taipa Village for dinner and shopping. Notable places to visit in Taipa are the Taipa Houses–Museum and the Museum of Taipa and Coloane History.

Cotai is extremely famous for gambling, as it contains some of the largest casinos in the world, including: Wynn Palace, The Parisian Macao, The Venetian Macao, MGM Macau, and Casino Lisboa (Macau). The largest casino in Macau is located inside The Venetian Macao, which boasts 376,000 square feet of gaming space, 640 gaming tables and 1,760 slot machines, which are specifically geared towards an Asian market.

Coloane, on the other hand, is popular for beach getaways and long Portuguese lunches. Coloane is also home to the popular Chapel of St. Francis Xavier, Macao Giant Panda Pavilion, and A-Ma Temple.

In Northern Macau is the Macau Peninsula, which houses many of the older, smaller casinos. This is the old city centre, home to a blend of old colonial ruins and bespoke new boutiques. Here, tourists can find budget guesthouses, such as San Va Hospedaria. Other popular places in Macau Peninsula include Ruins of Saint Paul's, Lou Lim Ieoc Garden, and Guia Fortress.

=== Currency ===
Tourists should note that the Macanese pataca (MOP$) is Macau's currency, however, the Hong Kong dollar (HK$) can also be withdrawn from ATMs in Macau and is accepted widely throughout the area.

=== Language ===
Tourists should note that the official languages of Macau are Cantonese and Portuguese, though Cantonese is the more widely spoken of the two. Additionally, English and Mandarin are relatively well understood in Macau.

=== Food and drink ===
There is a wide variety of distinct cuisine for tourists to try in Macau, including Macanese cuisine, Portuguese cuisine and Chinese cuisine. Macanese cuisine is a blend of Portuguese and Chinese cuisines. Listed below are popular dishes for visitors to try in Macau.

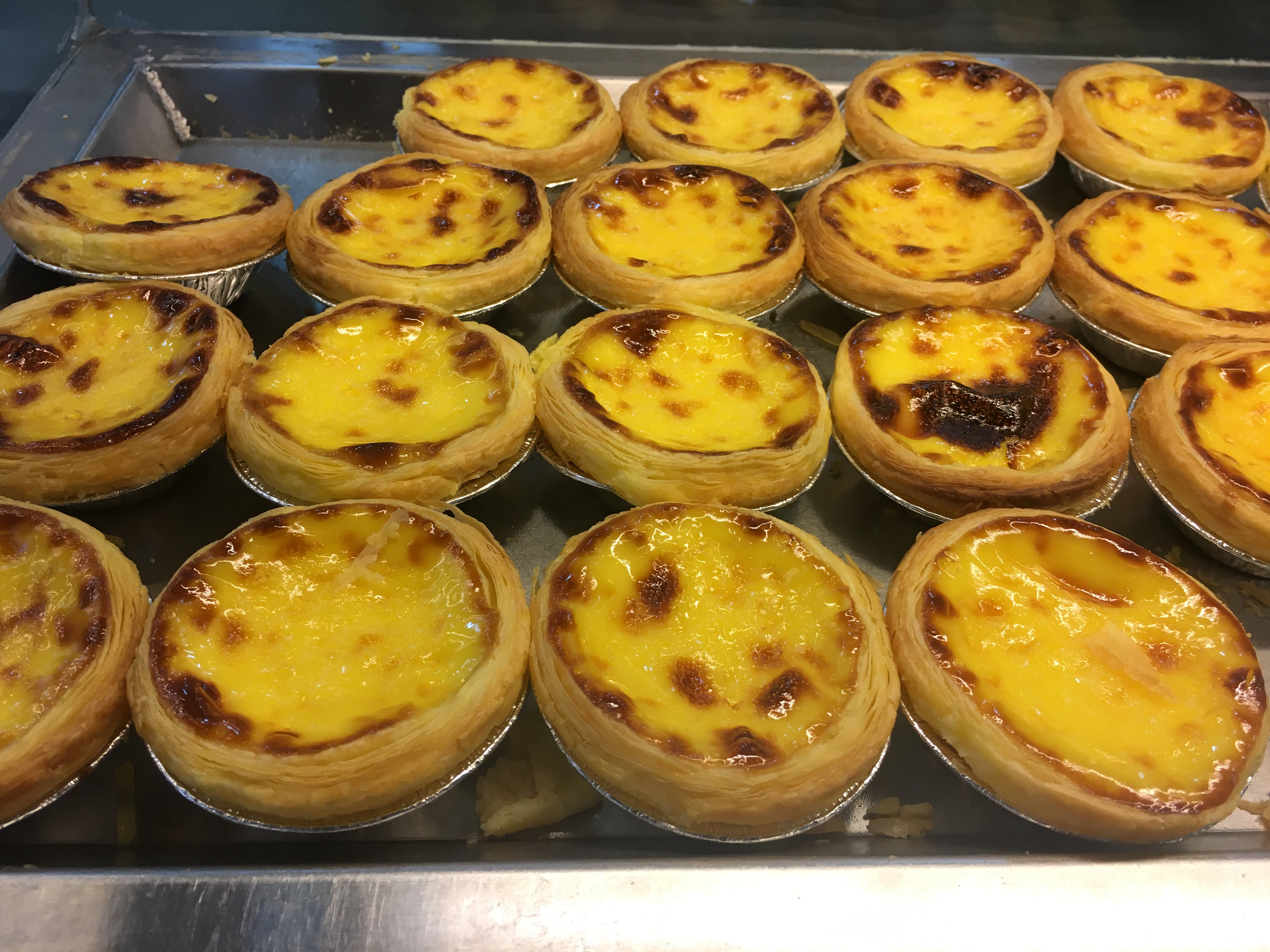
Famous Portuguese egg tarts

==== Popular Macanese & Portuguese dishes ====
- Portuguese green vegetable soup
- Grilled Portuguese sausage
- Bacalhau cakes
- African chicken
- Roast suckling pig
- Minchee
- Portuguese egg tart
- Serradura
- Molotof

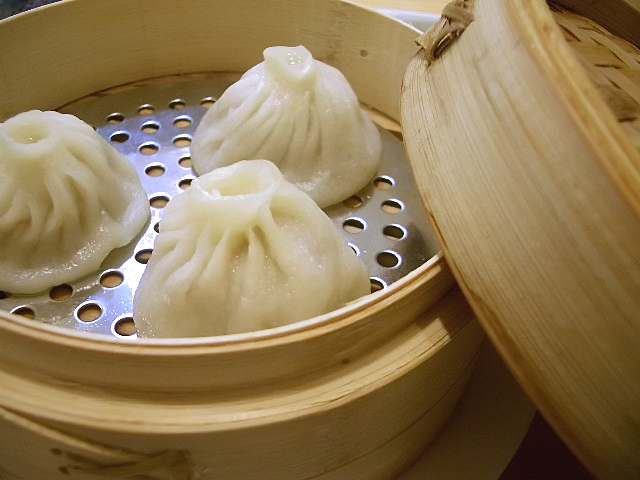
Xiao long bao, Shanghai-style dumplings

==== Popular Chinese Dim Sum & dishes ====
- Pork siu mai
- Xiao long bao
- Turnip cake
- Steamed beef balls
- Cha siu bao
- Rice noodle roll
- Sea cucumber
- Sweet and sour pork
- Egg custard bun
- Pumpkin cake

=== Climate ===
Ranging from around 20 °C (68 °F) to 26 °C (79 °F), the annual average temperature in Macau is approximately 23˚C (73˚F). Tourists should note that humidity levels are high in the city, averaging around 80% annually, but often rising much higher. Located in the subtropical climate zone, the rainy season in Macau falls between May and September each year. During this time of year Macau is hot and humid, and has been known to experience tropical storms (known as Typhoons).

According to the Macao Government Tourism Office, the most pleasant time of year to visit Macau is from October to December, at which time Macau experiences warm autumn days and lowered humidity levels. Macau's winter season is from January to March, with cold sunny days. In summer (June to August), it is recommended for visitors to wear light cotton clothes, whilst during the winter months (January to March) woollen clothes and a thick jacket are suggested. Further to this, cardigans and sweaters are recommended during spring (March to May) and autumn (September to December).

== Attractions and facilities ==
=== Accommodation ===
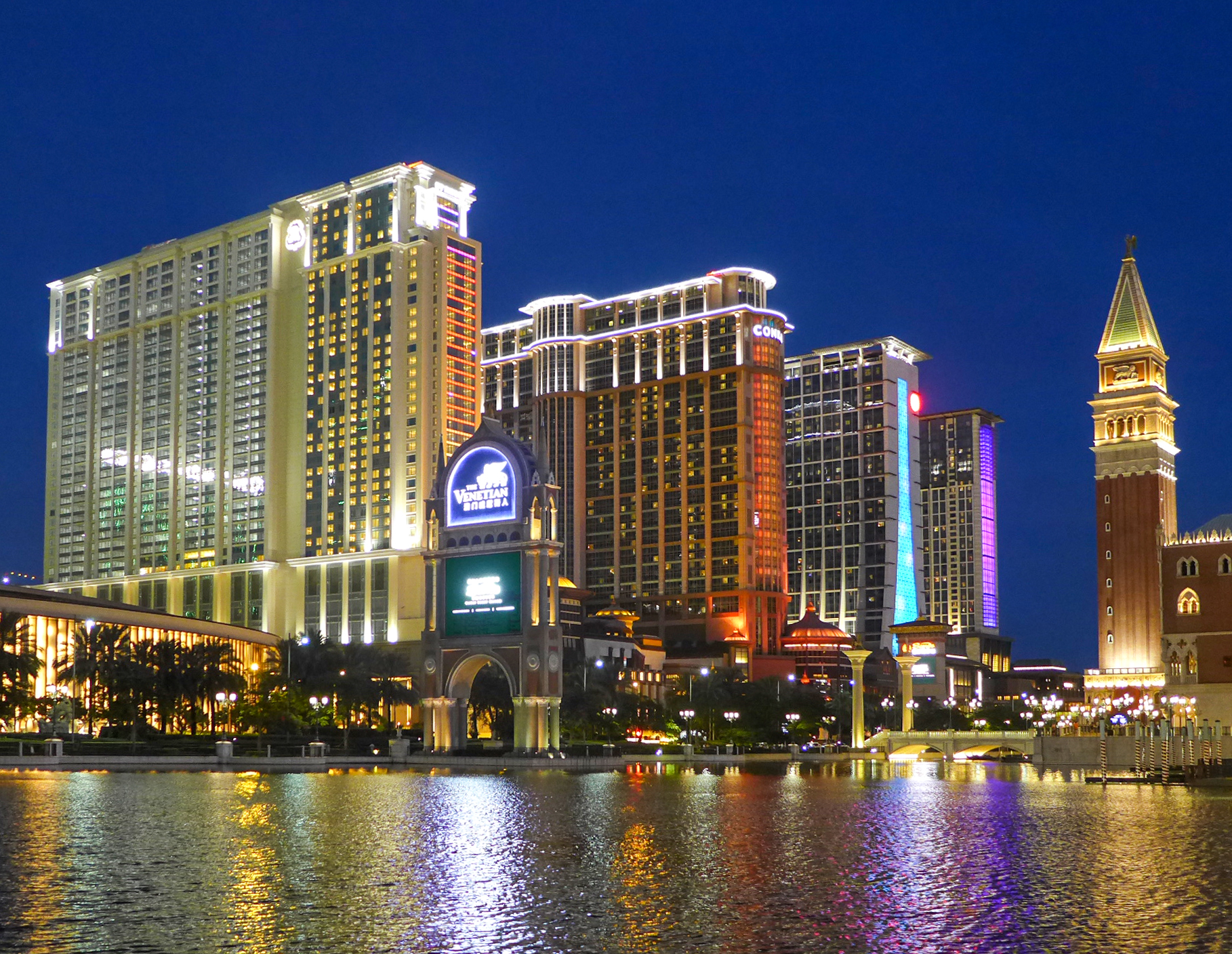
Cotai Strip, Macau

As a city, Macau caters to the various needs and budgets of visitors; offering 5-star luxury accommodation, affordable hostels, and guesthouses. Macau Peninsula has a myriad of accommodation options ranging from low priced guest houses to internationally known luxury hotel brands, such as the Mandarin Oriental, Macau. Cotai boasts a collection of large, brand-new casino hotels, many of which offer weekday deals for visitors. These hotels form the brightly-lit Cotai Strip, and include: Galaxy Macau, City of Dreams, Studio City, and Sheraton Grand Hotel. Coloane, on the other hand, is home to hostels and smaller inns, such as Grand Coloane Resort and Pousada de Juventude de Cheoc Van. In Taipa, there is a range of medium-sized hotels like Asia Boutique Inn. Overall, the greatest range of hotel options in terms of price and style can be found in Cotai, as this area experiences the greatest amount of tourism traffic in all of Macau.

=== Historical sites ===
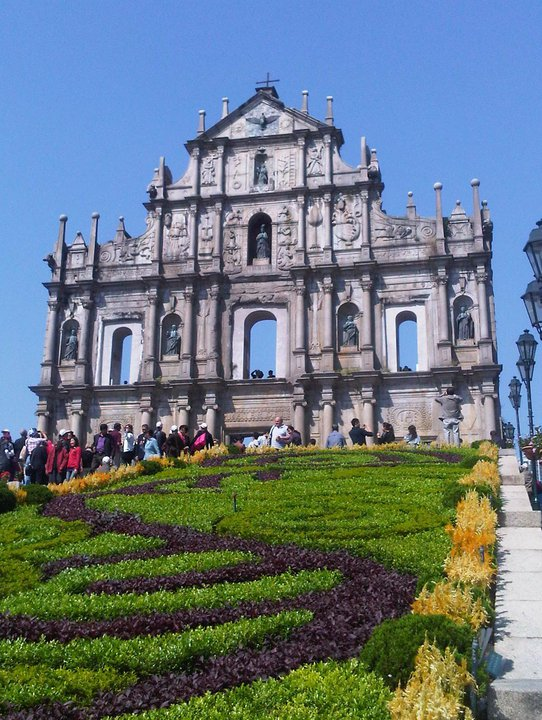
Ruins of Saint Paul's, Macau

There is a multitude of historical sites for tourists to see when visiting Macau, most of which are located in Macau Peninsula. These include churches, temples, gardens, fortresses, museums, galleries and more.

Considered by many as "the most treasured icon in Macau", the Ruins of Saint Paul's is located in Central Macau Peninsula. This tourism sight is the remains of an early-17th-century Jesuit church completed in 1602 by early Japanese Christian craftspeople and Chinese craftspeople, and originally designed by an Italian Jesuit. A fire erupted in the kitchen of the barracks in 1835, destroying everything except for what can still be seen today. Atop of remaining structure is a dove, which symbolises the Holy Spirit, encompassed by stone carvings of the moon, stars and sun.

Also located in Macau Peninsula is A-Ma Temple, which is thought to have already been standing when the Portuguese arrived in Macau in the 16th century. In fact, the name of Macau was derived from A-Ma, who is also known as 'Tin Hau', the goddess of the sea. It is said that when the Portuguese arrived and requested the name of where they were, they were told 'A-Ma Gau' (A-Ma Bay). Upon visiting A-Ma Temple, visitors will find the Gate Pavilion, Memorial Arch, Prayer Hall, Halls of Benevolence and Guanyin, and Zhengjiao Chanlin (a Buddhist pavilion). Inspired by a multitude of different belief systems, including Confucianism, Taoism and Buddhism, A-Ma Temple is a representation of Chinese culture; considered "unique" in its inclusion of various pavilions dedicated to the worship of a variety of deities within one complex.

The following locations are the main areas in Macau with historical sites for tourists to visit.

==== Macau Peninsula ====
- Ruins of Saint Paul's
- A-Ma Temple
- Senado Square
- St. Joseph's Seminary and Church
- Church of St Augustine
- Church of St Dominic
- Lou Kau Mansion
- Tap Seac Square
- Street of Happiness
- Penha Hill
- St Lazarus Church District
- Guia Fortress
- Casa Garden
- Flora Garden
- Lou Lim Ieoc Garden
- Luís de Camões Garden

==== Taipa ====
- Rua do Cunha
- Our Lady of Carmel Church, Macau

==== Coloane ====
- Chapel of St. Francis Xavier
- Tin Hau Temple
- Kun Iam Temple
- Tam Kung Temple

=== Retail ===
Retail in Macau's tourist areas is generally targeted towards tourists from elsewhere in China. Because Macau benefits from favorable taxation rules, it is a favored location for Chinese tourists to purchase luxury goods like cosmetics, jewelry, and designer fashion goods.

=== Activities (non-gambling) ===
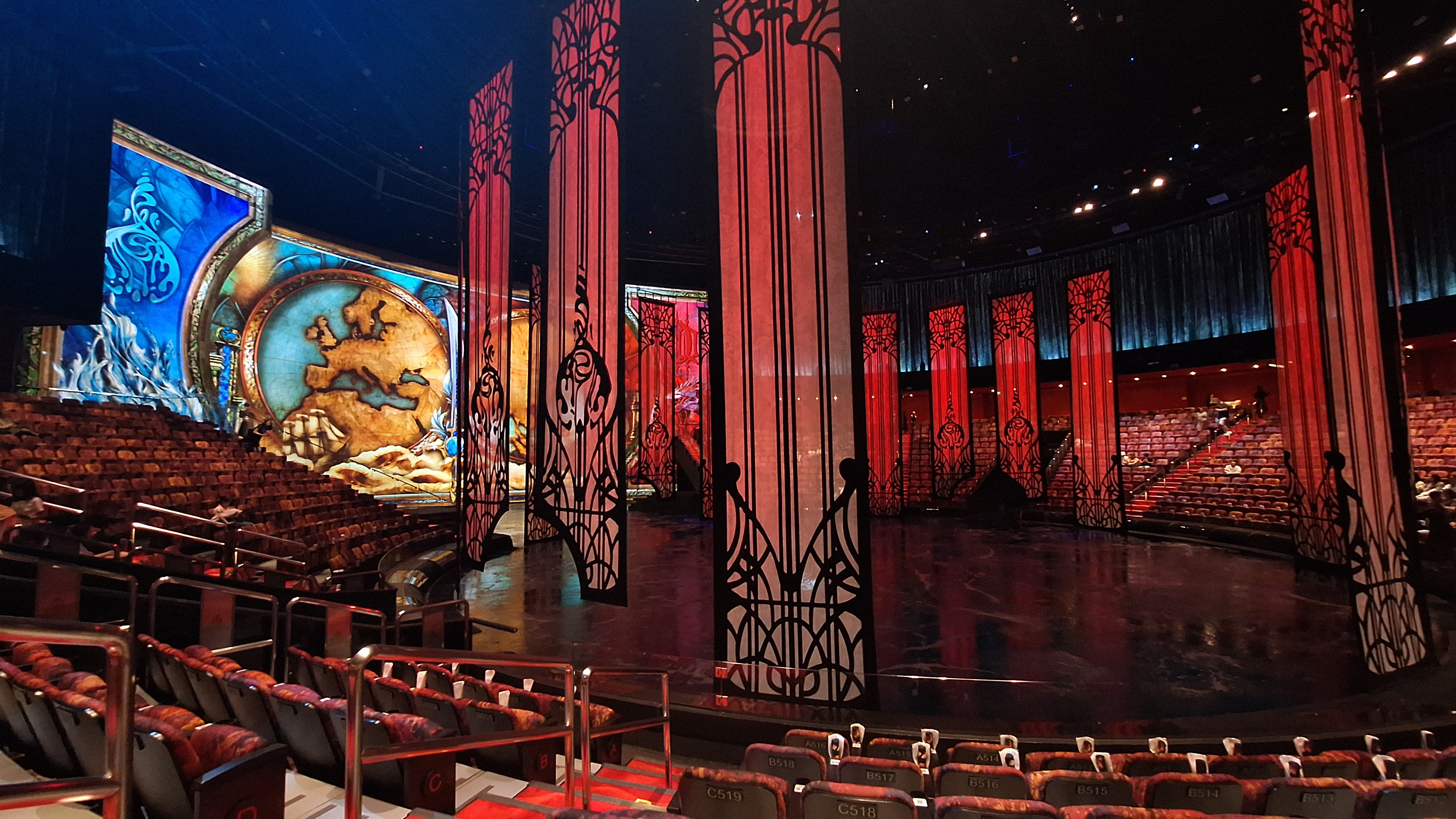
The House of Dancing Water theatre, Macau

There are various activities for tourists to do in Macau other than gambling. These include visiting museums, libraries, cultural centres, and more. Macau has also been home to large scale live productions, such as Cirque du Soleil's Zaia which closed in 2012, and City of Dreams' current The House of Dancing Water.

The House of Dancing Water is dubbed "Macau's most expensive show", consisting of "water stunts, acrobatics, aerial arts and theater". US$250 million was invested into the production of this show, which claims to appeal to the Chinese market as a "modern East-meets-West fable". The purpose-built theatre for this production is located within the City of Dreams. Tourists can expect to pay anywhere from HK$478 - HK$1,498 for tickets.

Another activity Macau offers for visitors is the Macau Tower Bungy Jump. This jump earned the Guinness World Record for the "Highest Commercial Bungy Jump in the world" at 233m (or 764 ft). Tourists can expect to pay HK$3,688 for their first jump, and a lower price of HK$1,675 for their second jump.

Listed below are further places to visit in Macau:

- Macau Museum of Art
- Sir Robert Ho Tung Library
- Macao Giant Panda Pavilion
- Museum of Macau
- Senate Library
- Maritime Museum
- Macao Cultural Centre
- Taipa Houses–Museum
- Museum of Taipa and Coloane History

== Gambling ==
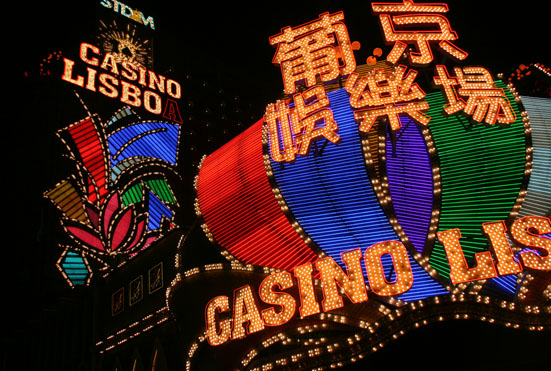
Casino Lisboa, Macau

Macau has been known as "Monte Carlo of the Orient" and "Las Vegas of the East", which is attributed to the vast number of Casinos throughout the location. It is understood that visitors to Macau greatly focus on gambling, with an average stay of 1.5 nights. Gaming tax contributes to a large portion of the Macau SAR's total fiscal revenue. In fact, the gaming industry "accounts for about half of Macau’s annual economy, and in 2007 Macau surpassed Las Vegas, Nevada, as the world leader in total annual gambling revenue". With over 30 major brick-and-mortar casinos, Macau includes both the "traditional gambling stalwarts from [its] glittery past and the new resorts that have appeared from western companies". As Macau relies heavily on the gaming industry for revenue, it "has been striving to diversify its economy" with business owners blaming "visitors lack of interest in anything apart from gambling". With the emergence of integrated casinos, a huge influx of tourists have been attracted to Macau. And so, there has been study into the "emerging but understudied phenomenon in tourism and hospitality: casino tourism".

The legal gambling age in Macau is 21, and a passport or Hong Kong identity card is accepted as a proof of age. In casinos, dress codes are variable and range from conservative-formal to casual. Tourists should take note that the local tender in Macau is the Hong Kong Dollar, not the Macanese Pataca.

As of at least 2015, 90% of tourist revenue in Macau is derived from gambling.

== Accessing Macau ==
=== Statistics ===
Most visitors arriving to Macau in 2014–2019, came from:

Rank	Country/Region	2019	2018	2017	2016	2015	2014
1	Mainland China	27,923,219	25,260,556	22,196,203	20,454,104	20,410,615	21,252,410
2	Hong Kong	7,354,094	6,327,925	6,165,129	6,419,839	6,534,543	6,426,608
3	Taiwan	1,063,355	1,060,968	1,060,107	1,074,525	988,059	953,753
4	South Korea	743,026	812,842	874,253	662,321	554,177	554,521
5	Philippines	423,106	312,072	307,139	287,025	276,806	262,853
6	Japan	295,783	325,798	328,990	300,613	282,217	299,849
7	Malaysia	206,277	227,854	218,301	222,809	229,102	250,046
8	United States	199,800	201,810	186,378	190,885	182,532	181,457
9	Indonesia	169,957	173,836	197,139	182,467	163,353	189,189
10	Thailand	151,521	181,379	198,222	236,169	180,836	175,906
11	India	127,351	147,870	148,121	165,278	167,578	167,216
12	Singapore	115,742	134,840	143,068	155,763	158,814	196,491
13	Australia	84,030	90,914	88,988	93,286	92,404	105,914
14	Canada	75,060	74,268	74,287	75,173	70,973	70,601
15	United Kingdom	59,284	58,319	57,121	61,301	59,985	60,756
	Total	39,406,181	35,803,663	32,610,506	30,950,336	30,714,628	31,525,632

=== Hong Kong-Zhuhai-Macau Bridge ===
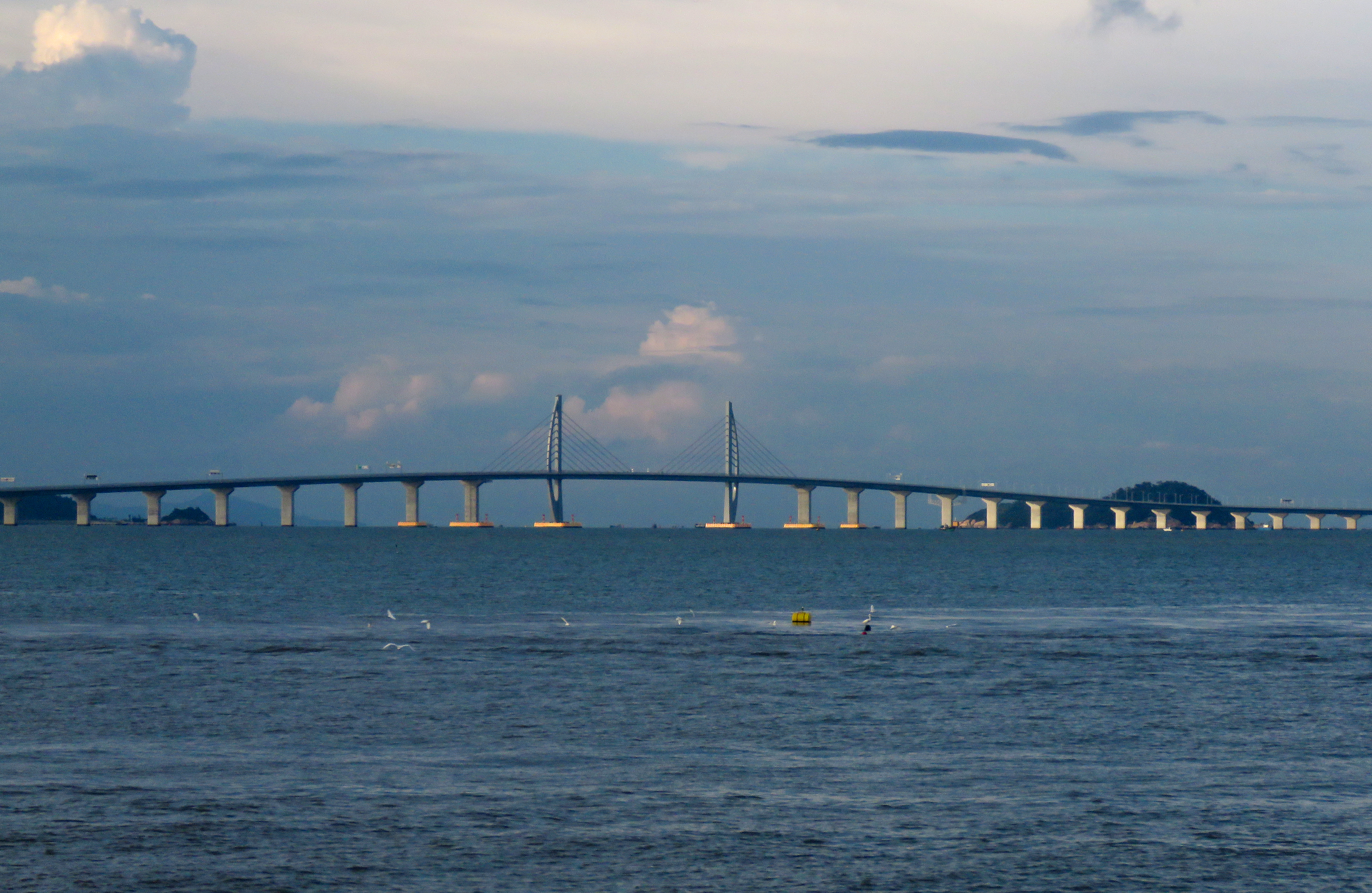
West section of Hong Kong–Zhuhai–Macau Bridge

Completed in 2018, the Hong Kong–Zhuhai–Macau Bridge connects Hong Kong, Zhuhai and Macau through "a series of bridges, sub-sea tunnels, viaducts and artificial islands". It is "the world's longest sea-crossing bridge" at 55 kilometres. The bridge was built with the intention of meeting increasing demands for passengers travelling between Hong Kong, Mainland China and Macau via the establishment of a new transportation link between the East and West banks of the Pearl River Delta.

There are two bus lines that run on this bridge, Hong Kong-Zhuhai and Hong Kong-Macau. Busses run frequently throughout the day from Hong Kong to Macau, and visitors can expect to pay HK$65 - HK$70 for a one-way ticket. The other option for travellers from Hong Kong is the ferry, which is more expensive with tickets priced around HK$170 - HK$200.

== See also ==
- Visa policy of Macau
- Individual Visit Scheme
- List of museums in Macau
- Media of Macau
- Macau travel guide from Wikivoyage
