= Tap Seac Square =

Public square in São Lázaro, Macau

Coordinates: 22°11′53″N 113°32′50″E

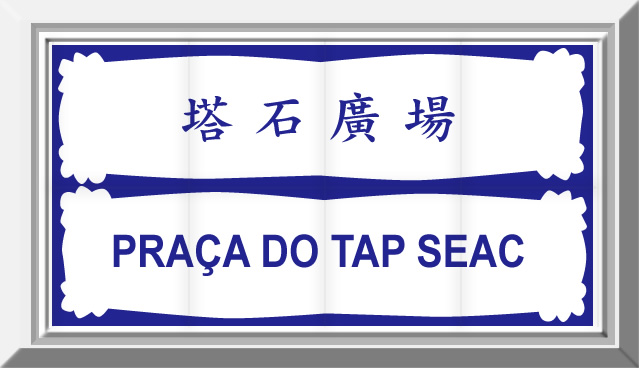
- Traditional Chinese: 塔石廣場
- Simplified Chinese: 塔石广场
Transcriptions
Standard Mandarin
- Hanyu Pinyin: Tǎshí Guǎngchǎng
Yue: Cantonese
- Jyutping: taap3 sek6 gwong2 coeng4

Tap Seac Square (Chinese: 塔石廣場; Portuguese: Praça do Tap Seac) is a major public square in São Lázaro, Macau. It stood on the site of a former stadium and was completed in 2007. Amongst others, the buildings of the Macau Central Library, the Cultural Institute and the Macau Historic Archives are located around the square.

== Gallery ==
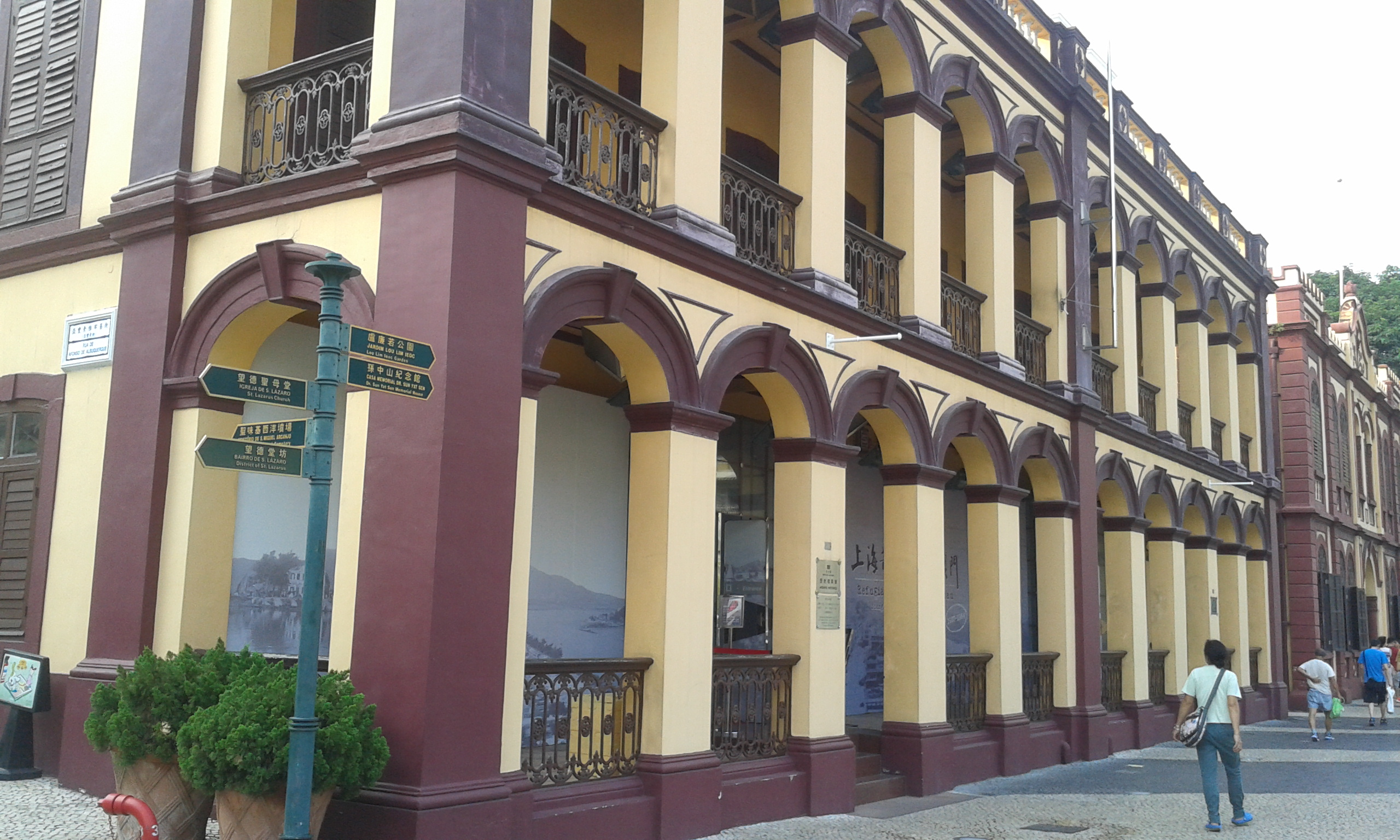
Archives of Macao

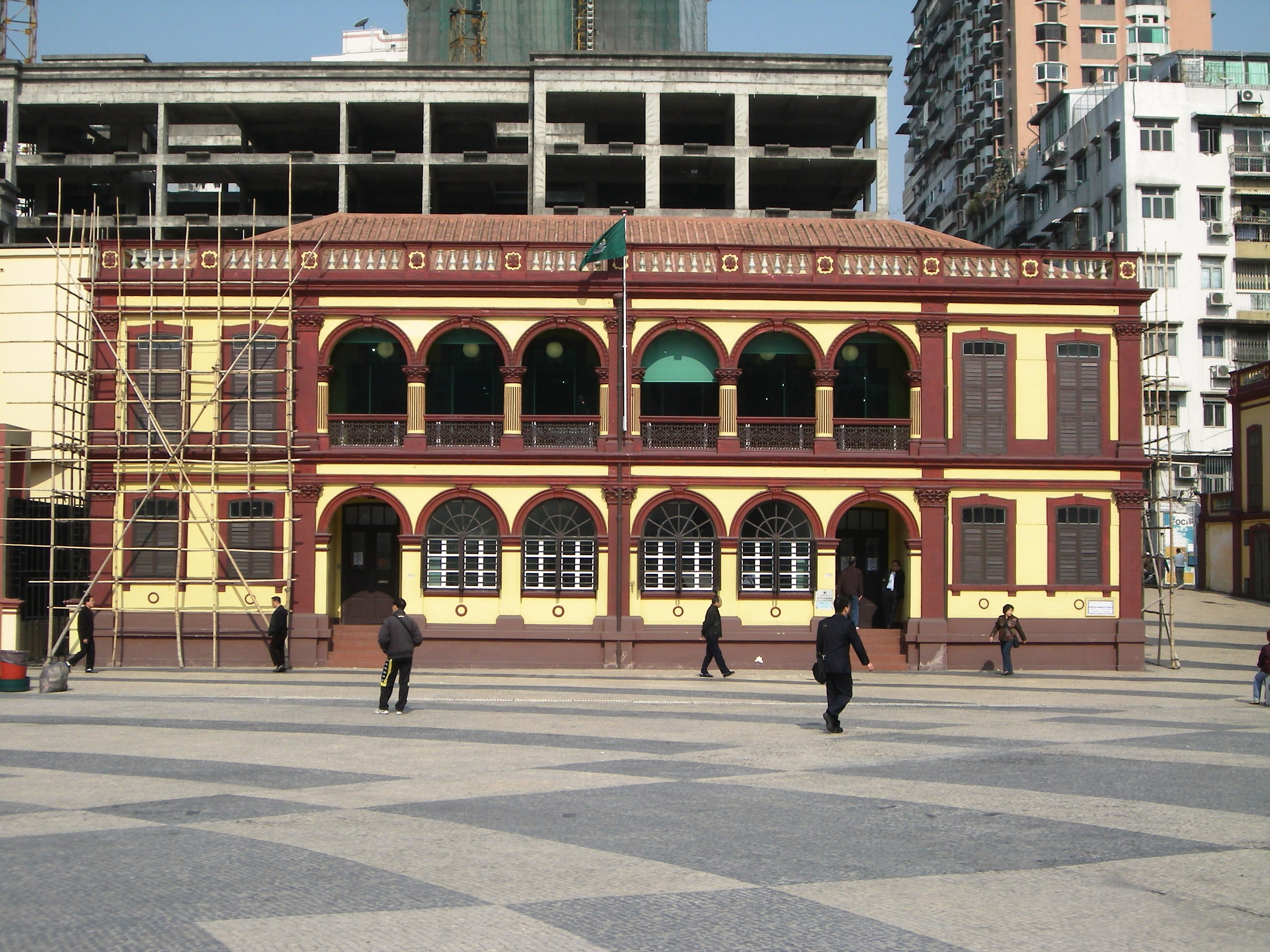
Macau Central Library and Civic and Municipal Affairs Bureau

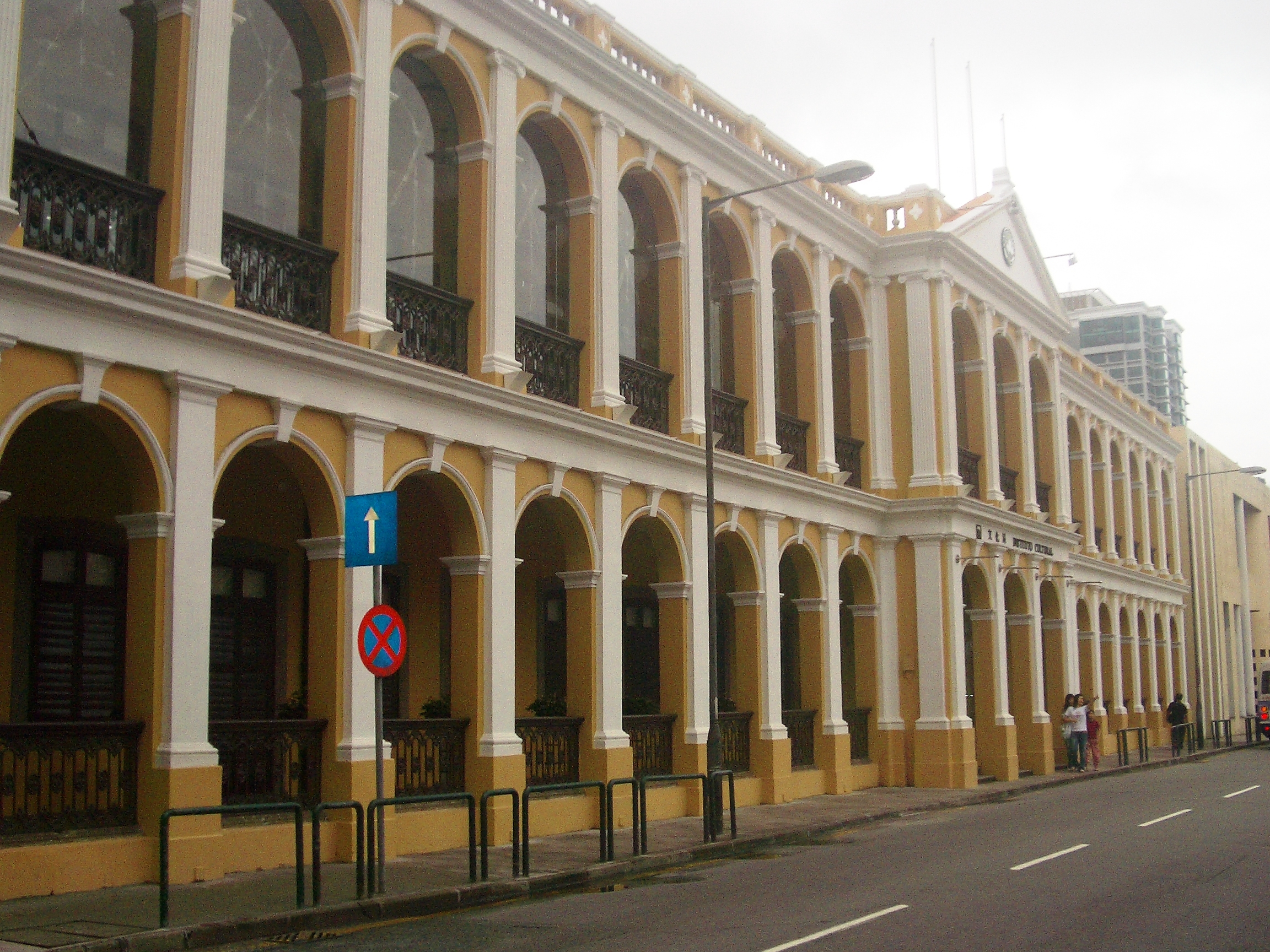
Cultural Institute

== See also ==
- List of tourist attractions in Macau
