= Macau Tea Culture House =

Museum in São Lázaro, Macau, China

Macao Tea Culture House
- 澳門茶文化館 (Chinese); Casa Cultural de Chá de Macau (Portuguese)
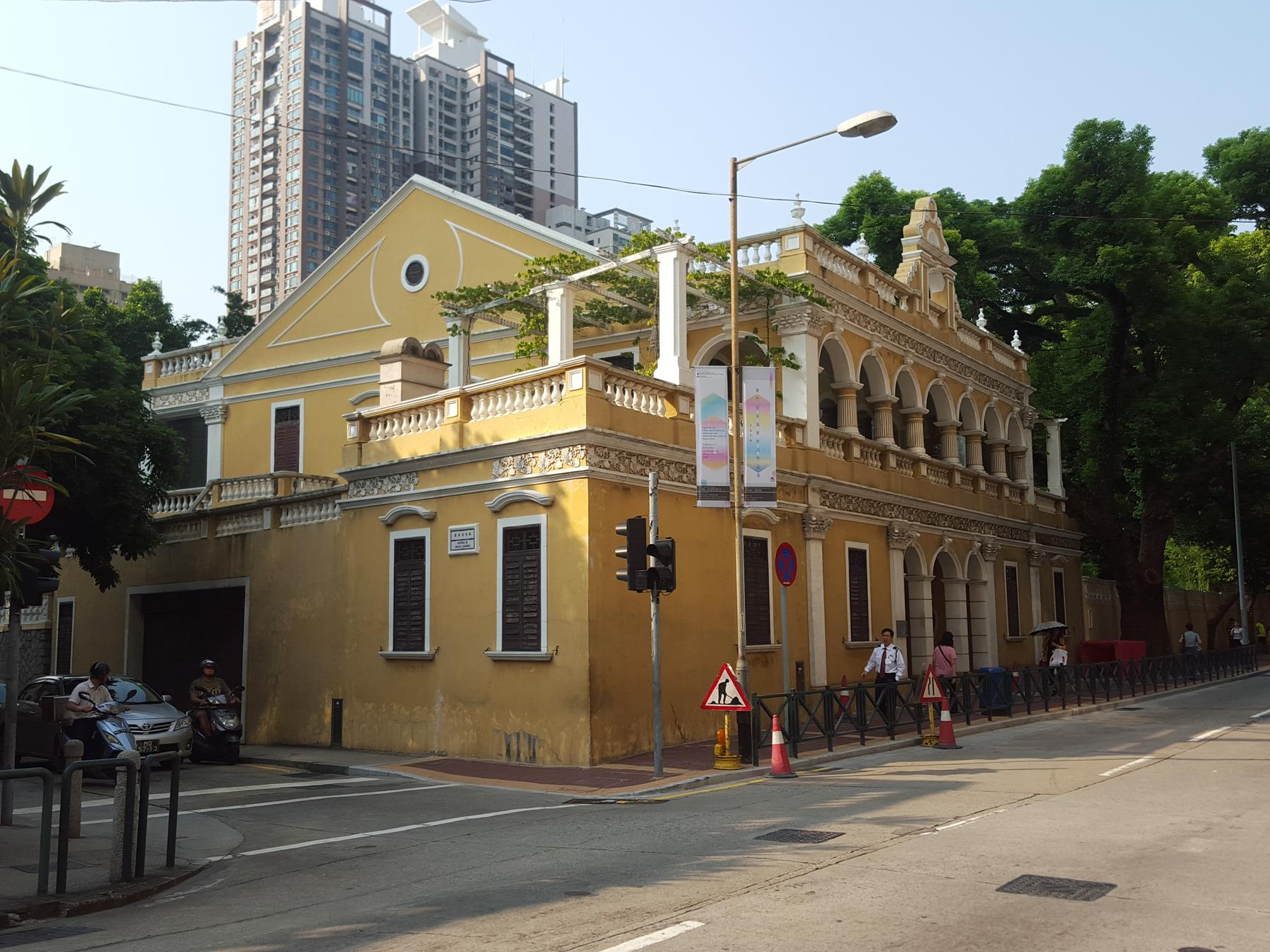
- Established: 1 June 2005
- Location: São Lázaro, Macau, China
- Coordinates: 22°11′59.2″N 113°32′52.0″E
- Type: museum
- Architect: Carlos Alberto dos Santos Marreiros

Macau Tea Culture House

Chinese name
- Traditional Chinese: 澳門茶文化館
- Simplified Chinese: 澳门茶文化馆
Transcriptions
Standard Mandarin
- Hanyu Pinyin: Àomén Chá Wénhuàguǎn
Yue: Cantonese
- Jyutping: ou3 mun4*2 caa4 man4 faa3 gun2

Portuguese name
- Portuguese: Casa Cultural de Chá de Macau

The Macao Tea Culture House (Chinese: 澳門茶文化館; Portuguese: Casa Cultural de Chá de Macau) is a museum about tea in São Lázaro, Macau, China.

== History ==
The museum building was originally part of Lou Lim Ioc Garden. The museum was opened on 1 June 2005.

== Architecture ==
The museum building features southern European architectural style with Chinese tiled roof which spreads over an area of 1,076 square metres (11,580 sq ft).

== Exhibitions ==
The museum features tea cultures and history of Macau, Mainland China and the Western world.

== See also ==
- List of museums in Macau
