= Red market =

Red market may refer to:

- Organ trade, the trading of human organs, tissues, or other body products
- The Red Market, a book by Scott Carney about economic transactions around the human body
- "Red Market" in counter-economics, meaning market of violence and theft not approved by the State
- Red Market (building), in Santo António, Macau, China

== See also ==
- Qırmızı Bazar ('Red market'), a village in Azerbaijan
