= Macao Public Library =

Public library in Macau, China

Coordinates: 22.19240°N 113.54032°E

Chinese name
- Traditional Chinese: 澳門公共圖書館
- Simplified Chinese: 澳门公共图书馆
Transcriptions
Standard Mandarin
- Hanyu Pinyin: Àomén Gōnggòng Túshūguǎn
Yue: Cantonese
- Jyutping: ou3 mun4*2 gung1 gung6 tou4 syu1 gun2

Portuguese name
- Portuguese: Biblioteca Pública de Macau

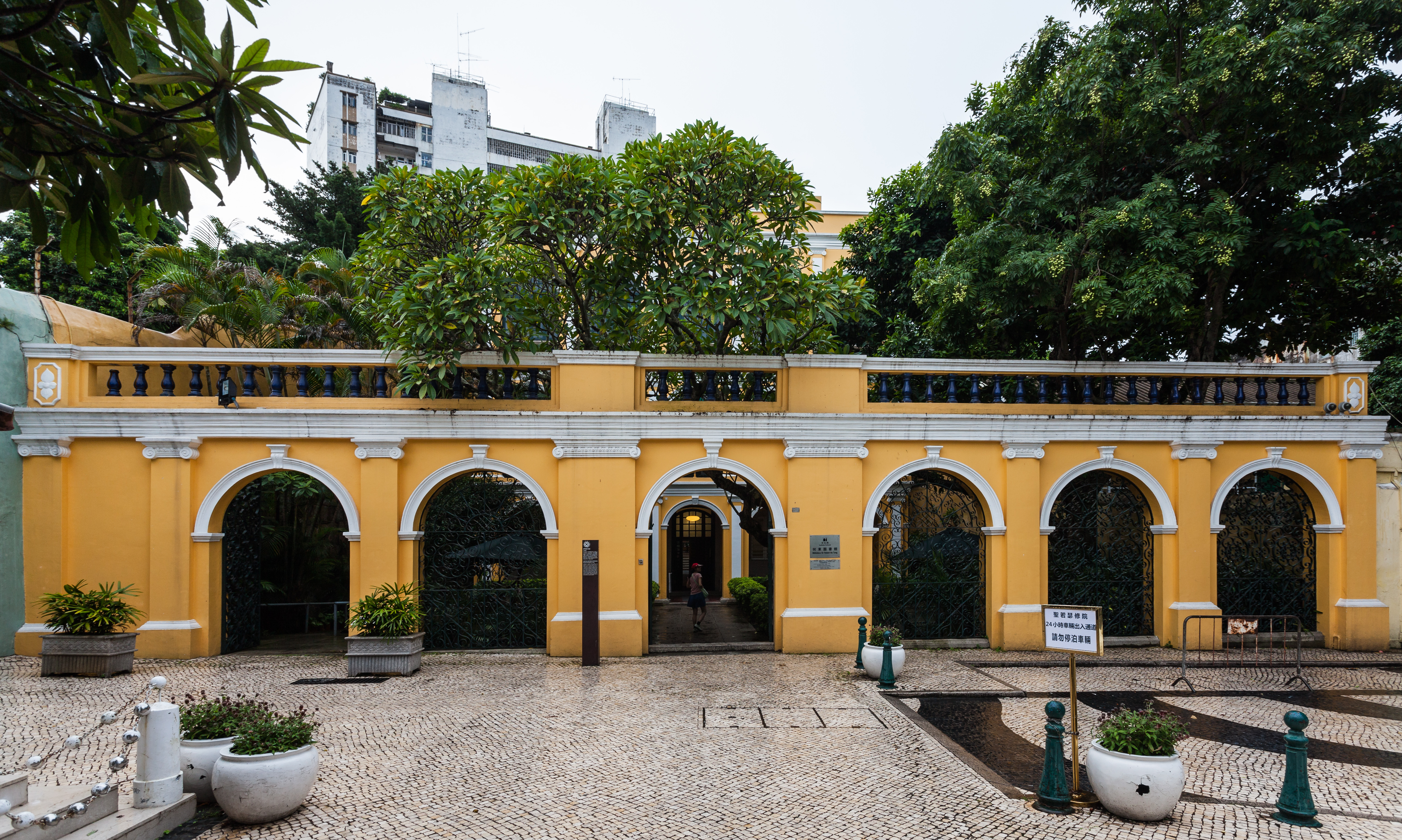
Sir Robert Ho Tung Library, which houses the head office of the library system

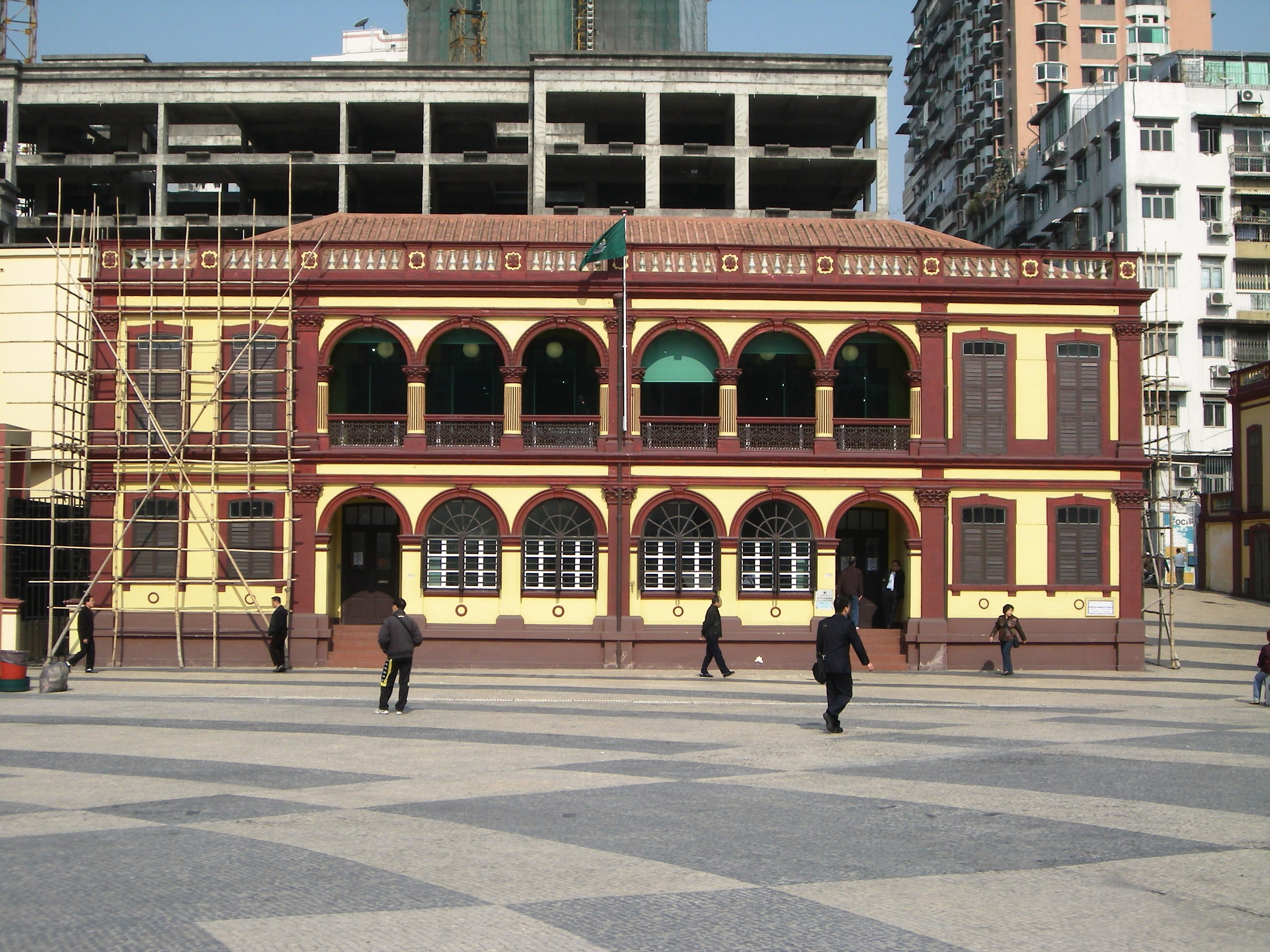
Macao Central Library

The Macao Public Library (Chinese: 澳門公共圖書館; Portuguese: Biblioteca Pública de Macau), formerly known as Macao Central Library; founded in 1895, is a public library system under the Cultural Affairs Bureau of the Macao Special Administrative Region Government.

There are 15 branch libraries including Macao Central Library in the Macao Public Library network, as well as a special library. In 2023, the public library system had approximately 2.54 million library visitors, and more than 550,000 books will be borrowed.

The head office is on the ground floor of the old building of the Sir Robert Ho Tung Library in São Lourenço.

== History ==
On 24 September 2019, the Seac Pai Van Library opened. It is located at the Community Complex of the Seac Pai Van public housing estate in Coloane.

The Wong Ieng Kuan Library in Taipa (氹仔黃營均圖書館; Biblioteca de Wong Ieng Kuan da Taipa), which opened in 2005, closed on 1 January 2022. It was located inside the Luís de Camões Garden.

== Libraries ==
The libraries of the Macao Public Library system include the following:

Central District:

- Macao Central Library – São Lázaro
- Library in Ho Yin Garden (何賢公園圖書館; Biblioteca do Jardim Comendador Ho Yin) – Sé

North District (all in Nossa Senhora de Fátima):

- Bairro da Ilha Verde Library (青洲坊圖書館; Biblioteca da Bairro da Ilha Verde Library)
- Mong Há Library (望廈圖書館; Biblioteca de Mong Há)
- Wong Ieng Kuan Library in Areia Preta Urban Park (黑沙環公園黃營均圖書館; Biblioteca de Wong Ieng Kuan no Jardim da Areia Preta)
- Wong Ieng Kuan Children's Library in Areia Preta Urban Park (黑沙環公園黃營均兒童圖書館; Biblioteca Infantil Wong Ieng Kuan no Jardim da Areia Preta)
- Wong Ieng Kuan Library in Dr. Sun Yat-Sen Municipal Park (紀念孫中山公園黃營均圖書館; Biblioteca de Wong Ieng Kuan no Parque Dr. Sun Yat Sen)

Southern District (all in São Lourenço):

- Sir Robert Ho Tung Library
- S. Lourenço Library (下環圖書館; Biblioteca de S. Lourenço)

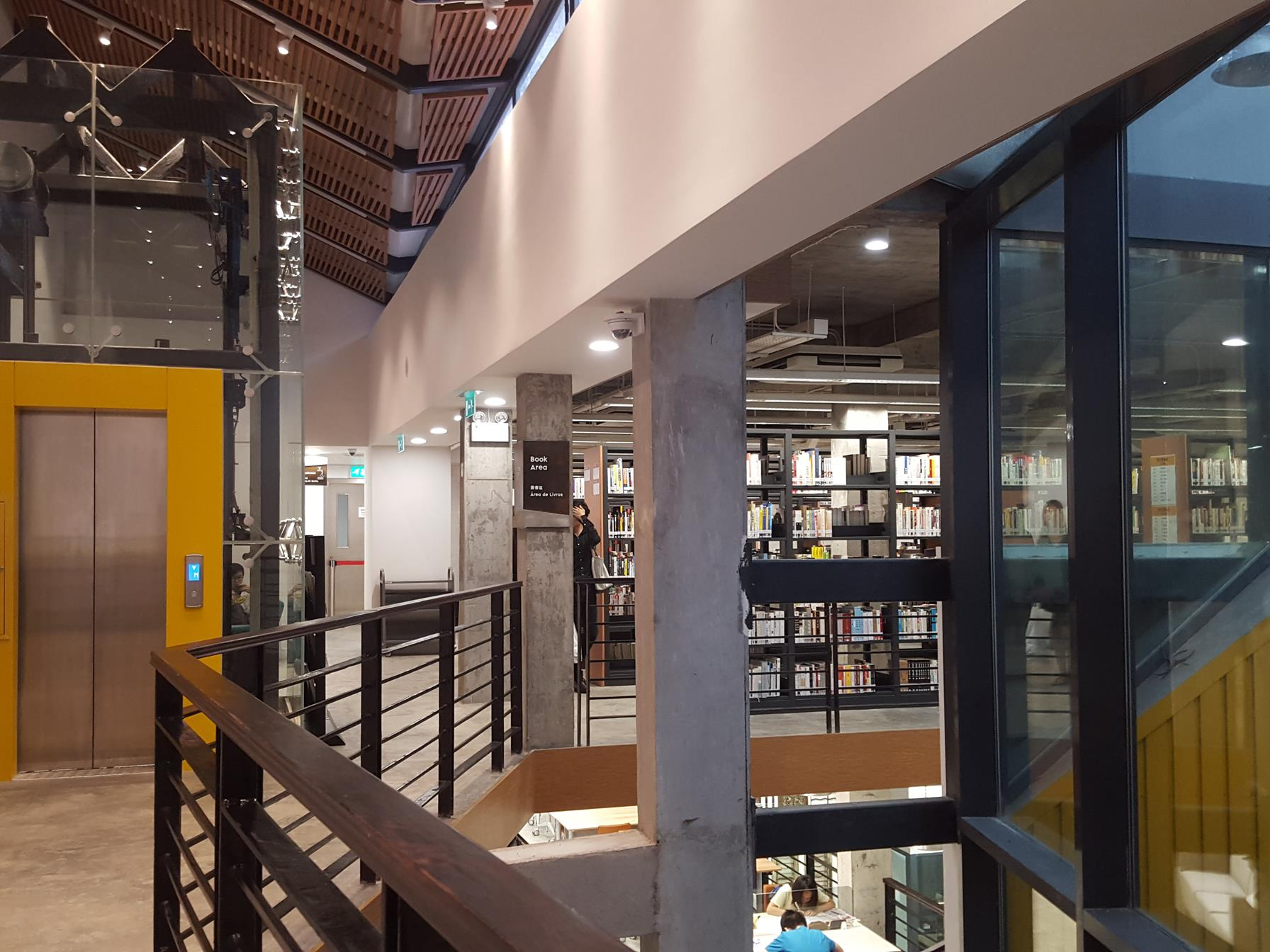
Inside of Patane Library

Western District (all in Santo António):

- Patane Library (沙梨頭圖書館; Biblioteca do Patane)
- Red Market Library (紅街市圖書館; Biblioteca do Mercado Vermelho)
- Wong Ieng Kuan Library in Luis de Camões Garden (白鴿巢公園黃營均圖書館; Biblioteca de Wong Ieng Kuan no Jardim Luis de Camões)

Taipa and Coloane:

- Taipa Library (氹仔圖書館; Biblioteca da Taipa)
- Coloane Library (路環圖書館; Biblioteca de Coloane)
- Seac Pai Van Library (石排灣圖書館; Biblioteca de Seac Pai Van)

== See also ==
- List of libraries in China
