= Avenida Horta e Costa =

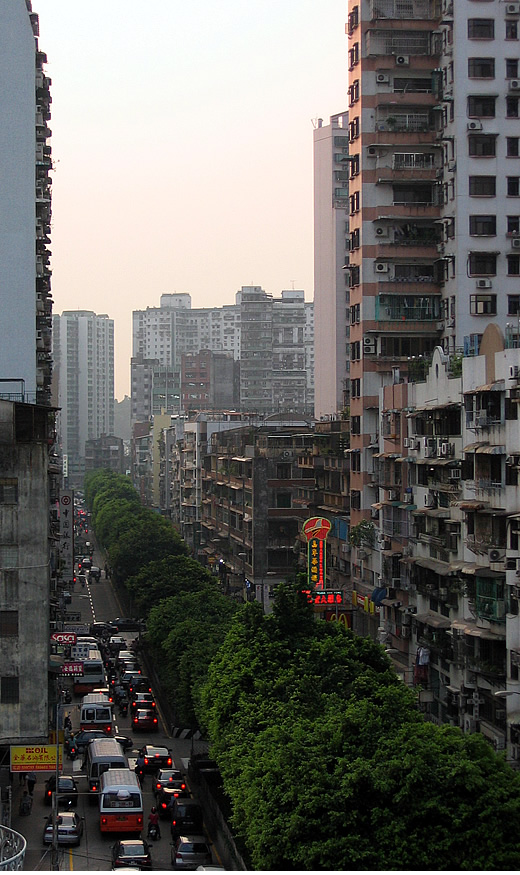
- A look down on Avenida de Horta e Costa
- Native name: 高士德大馬路 (Chinese)
- Length: 750 m (2,460 ft)
- Location: Macau Peninsula, Macau, China

Avenida Horta e Costa
- Traditional Chinese: 高士德大馬路
Transcriptions
Standard Mandarin
- Hanyu Pinyin: Gāoshìdédà mǎlù
Yue: Cantonese
- Jyutping: gou1si6dak1daai6 maa5lou6

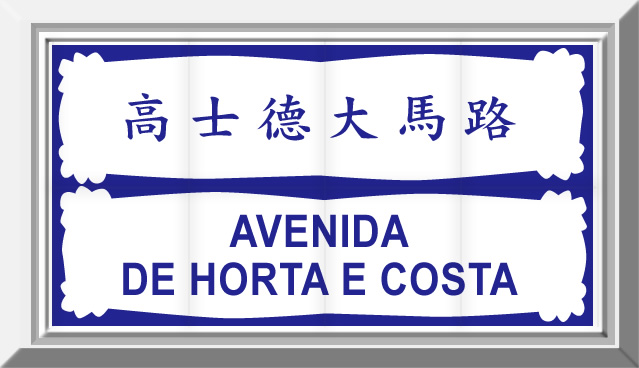
Street sign of Avenida Horta e Costa

Avenida Horta e Costa (Chinese: 高士德大馬路) is a major thoroughfare in Macau.

== Naming ==
The road was named after José Maria de Sousa Horta e Costa, twice appointed governor of Macau.

== Famous buildings ==
The Red Market of Macau is located at one end of the road, as is the Music Conservatory of Macau.

== See also ==
- List of roads in Macau
