= Red Market (building) =

Wet market in Macau, China

- 紅街市大樓
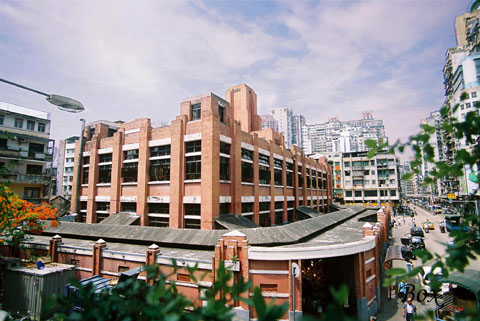

- Location within Macau
- Alternative names: Edifício do Mercado Vermelho

General information
- Type: Brick Type
- Location: Macau Peninsula, Macau, Avenida do Almirante Lacerda
- Coordinates: 22.2054°N 113.5448°E
- Completed: 1936

Height
- Top floor: 3

Design and construction
- Architect: Júlio Alberto Basto

The Almirante Lacerda Municipal Market (Chinese: 提督街市; Portuguese: Mercado Municipal Almirante Lacerda), popularly known as the Red Market (Chinese: 紅街市; Portuguese: Mercado Vermelho), is a three-story wet market building in Santo António, Macau, China.

== History ==
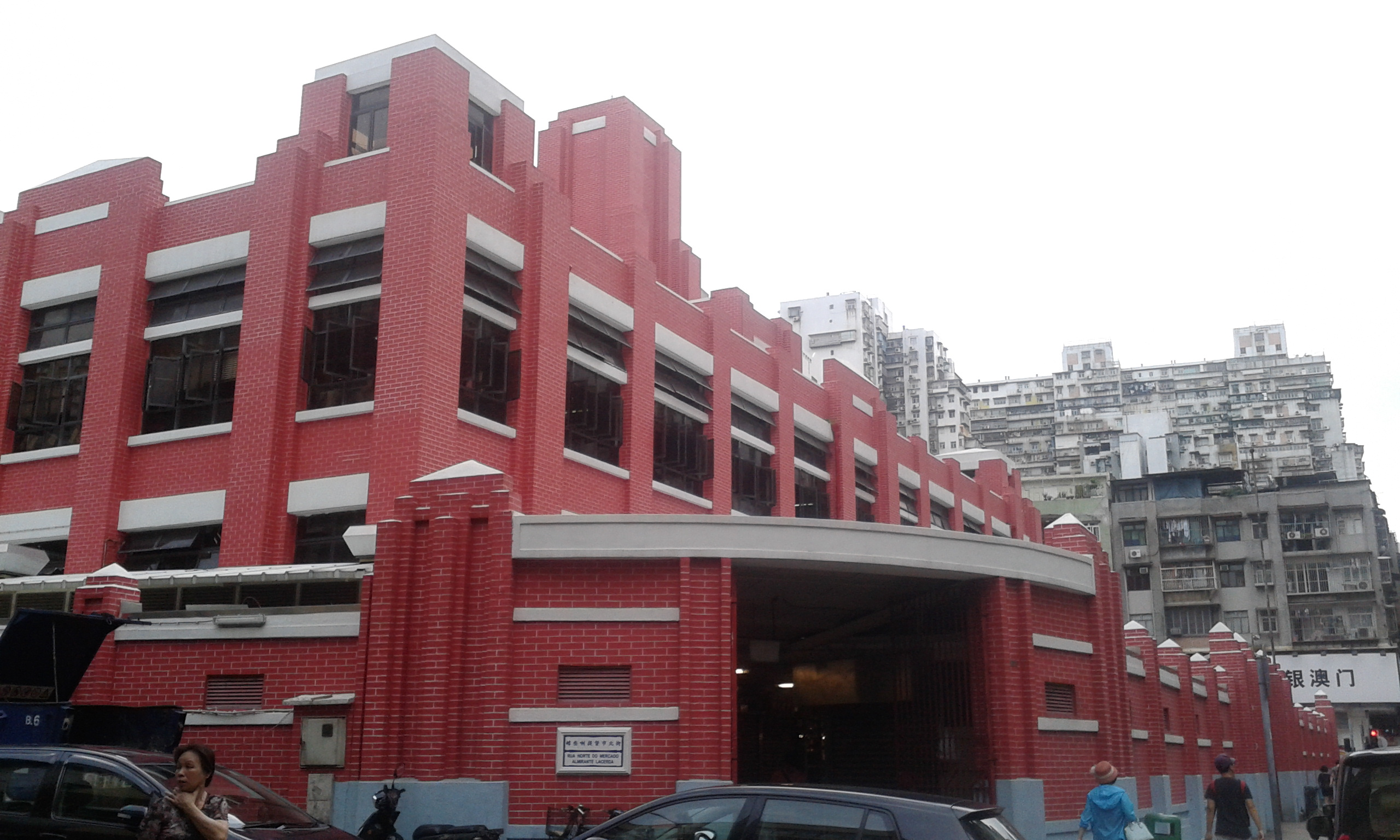
Red Market

It was planned by the architect Júlio Alberto Basto in 1934 and finally erected in 1936 and derives its name from the red bricks used in construction. The market is located at the intersection of Avenida Almirante Lacerda and Avenida Horta e Costa on the Macau Peninsula and is one of the most popular markets in Macau.

The building is symmetrical in layout and has a clock tower in the middle and a watchtower in each corner. It was gazetted by the Government of Macau as an architectural heritage site (Decree No.83/92/M). In olden times, the market was situated next to the waterfront from where the sellers bought its goods directly from the docks. The surrounding street, Red Market Pedestrian Street, is known for its flowers-selling kiosks.

A rich variety of seafood produce is available twice daily from mainland China or locally. In addition, meat (third floor), fish (second floor), poultry, vegetables (ground floor), dried food, fresh fruits, flowers and other perishable products (outside at the Red Market Pedestrian Street) are available too. The Red Market opens daily from 07:30 - 19:30hrs.

Nearby, heading towards the Flora Garden at Guia Hill and Avenida de Horta e Costa is another main shopping area known as the Three Lamps District. Along the streets and nearby alleys are a variety of shops that sell clothing, shoes, jewelry and small electronic parts at affordable prices.

== See also ==
- Economy of Macau
