= Vasco da Gama Garden =

Garden in São Lázaro, Macau, China

- Chinese: 華士古達嘉馬花園; Portuguese: Jardim de Vasco da Gama
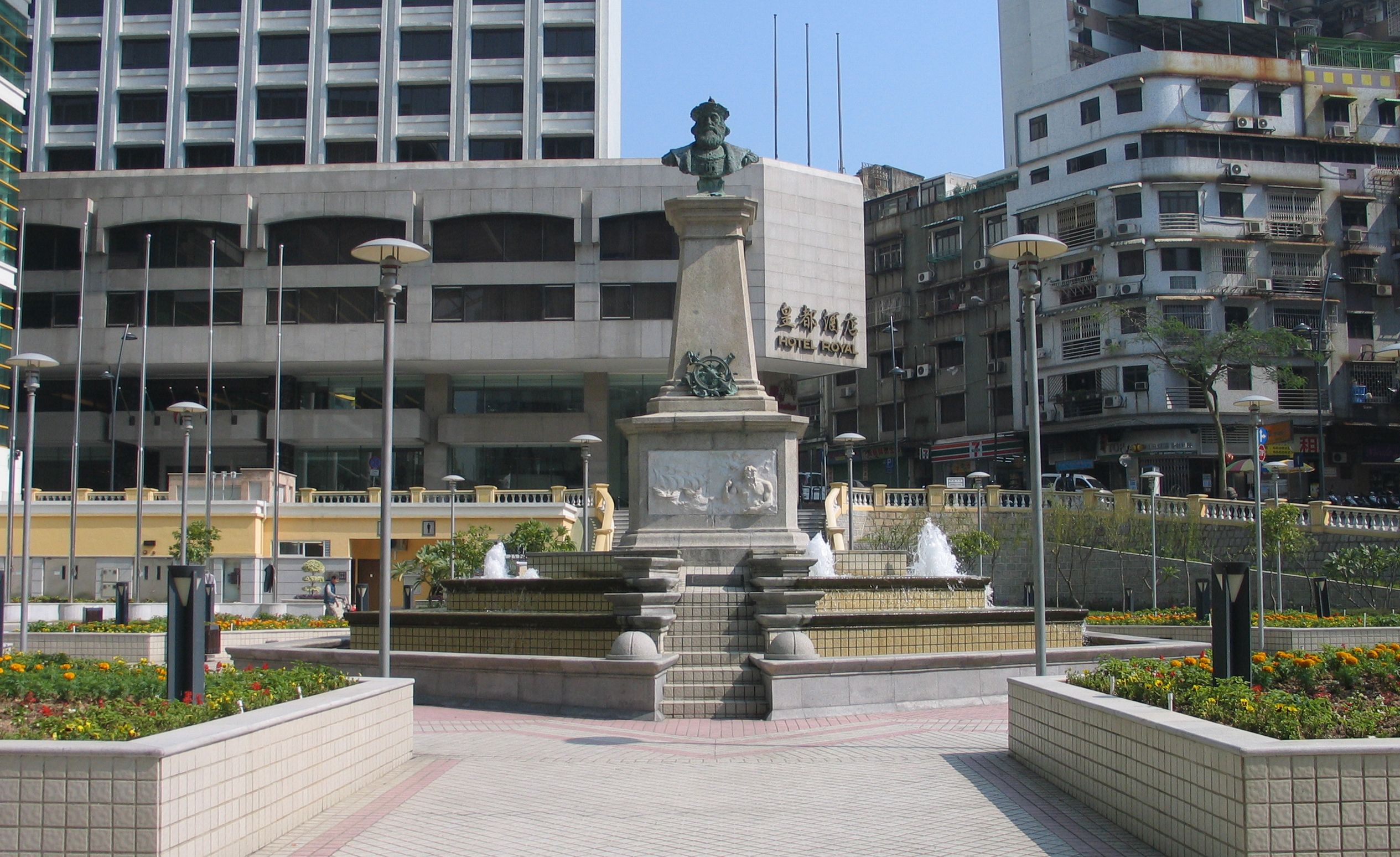
- Interactive map of Vasco da Gama Garden
- Type: garden
- Location: São Lázaro, Macau, China
- Coordinates: 22°11′46.4″N 113°32′47.4″E
- Area: 0.5 hectares (1.2 acres)
- Created: 19th century

Vasco da Gama Garden

Chinese name
- Traditional Chinese: 華士古達嘉馬花園
- Simplified Chinese: 华士古达嘉马花园
Transcriptions
Standard Mandarin
- Hanyu Pinyin: Huáshìgǔ Dá Jiāmǎ Huāyuán
Yue: Cantonese
- Jyutping: waa4 si6 gu2 daat6 gaa1 maa5 faa1 jyun4*2

Portuguese name
- Portuguese: Jardim de Vasco da Gama

The Vasco da Gama Garden (Chinese: 華士古達嘉馬花園; Portuguese: Jardim de Vasco da Gama) is a garden in São Lázaro, Macau, China. It is located between Rua de Ferreira do Amaral, Calçada do Gaio and Estrada da Vitória.

== History ==
The garden was created in the 19th century in Portuguese Macau. Along with Victory Garden, the Vasco da Gama Garden was part of the Vasco da Gama avenue built in 1898. In 1911, the bust of Vasco da Gama was erected. In 1997, the garden underwent renovation where fountains and barrier-free access were built on the lower-level of the garden and a small pond on the upper-level. In 2004, the garden underwent another renovation where an underground car park was constructed beneath it.

== Geology ==
The park is situated between Rua de Ferreira do Amaral, Calçada do Gaio and Estrada da Vitória. The garden spans over an area of 5,000 square metres (54,000 sq ft). It features a wave-shaped lake on the lower level of the garden and a fountain with waterspouts. It has a length of 500 meters and a width of 65 meters which consists of two plots of land.

== See also ==
- List of tourist attractions in Macau
