= Tai Fung Tong Art House =

Art center in São Lázaro, Macau, China

- 大瘋堂藝舍
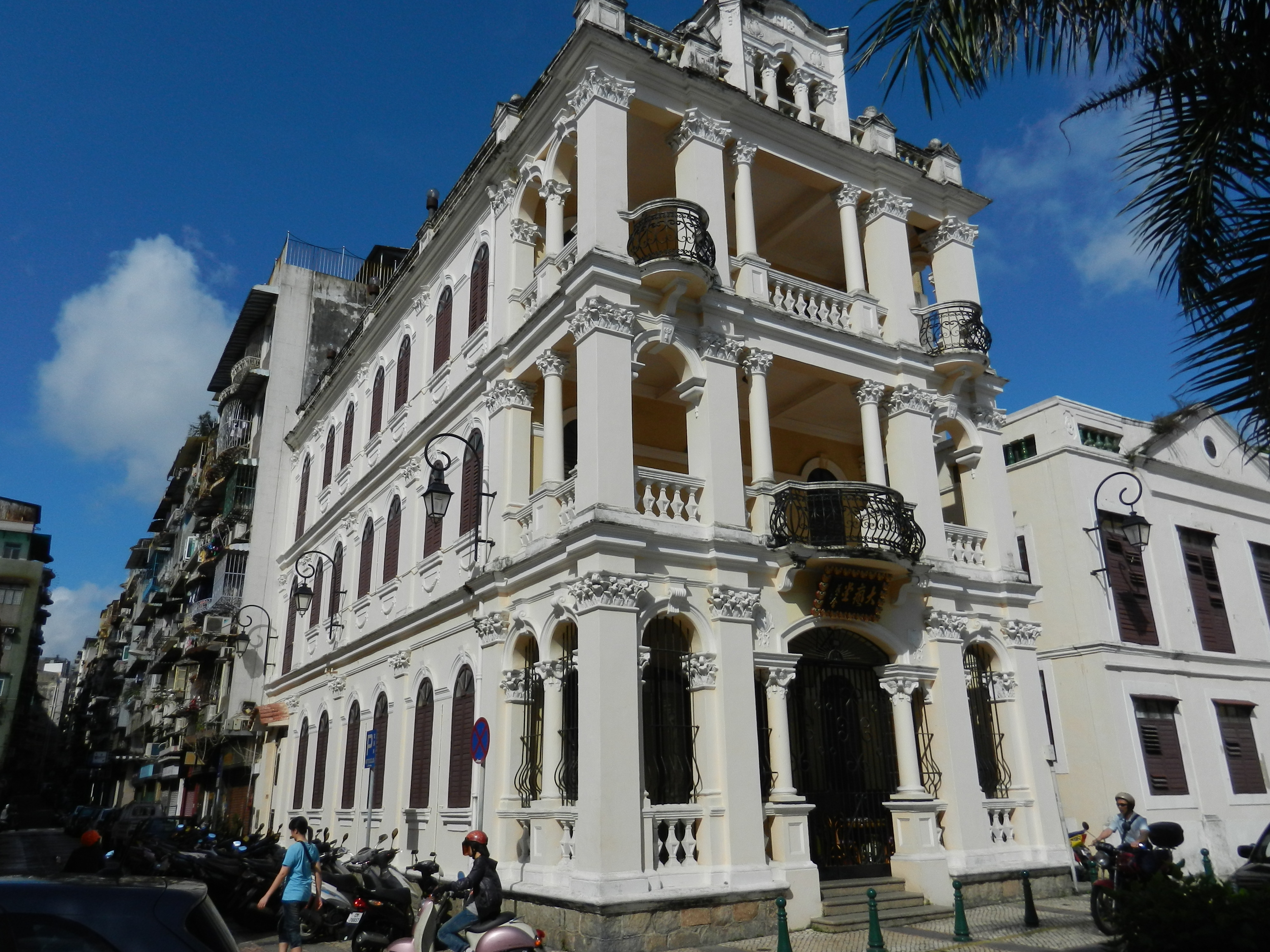
- Interactive map of the Tai Fung Tong Art House area

General information
- Type: arts center
- Location: São Lázaro, Macau, China
- Coordinates: 22°11′49.1″N 113°32′41.4″E
- Completed: 1918

Technical details
- Floor count: 5
- Floor area: 45,000 m^{2}

Website
- Official website (in Chinese)

Tai Fung Tong Art House
- Traditional Chinese: 大瘋堂藝舍
- Simplified Chinese: 大疯堂艺舍
Transcriptions
Standard Mandarin
- Hanyu Pinyin: Dàfēngtáng Yìshè
Yue: Cantonese
- Jyutping: daai6 fung1 tong4 ngai6 se3

The Tai Fung Tong Art House (traditional Chinese: 大瘋堂藝舍; simplified Chinese: 大疯堂艺舍) is an arts center in São Lázaro, Macau, China.

== History ==
The art house is located at Choi Lok Chi Mansion which was constructed in 1918 by Choi Lok Chi, the director of Kiang Wu Hospital and Macao Chamber of Commerce and the president of Macau Tung Sin Tong Charitable Society. The mansion once housed a catholic school.

== See also ==
- List of tourist attractions in Macau
