= São Lázaro =

São Lázaro 望德堂區 Saint Lazarus
- Freguesia
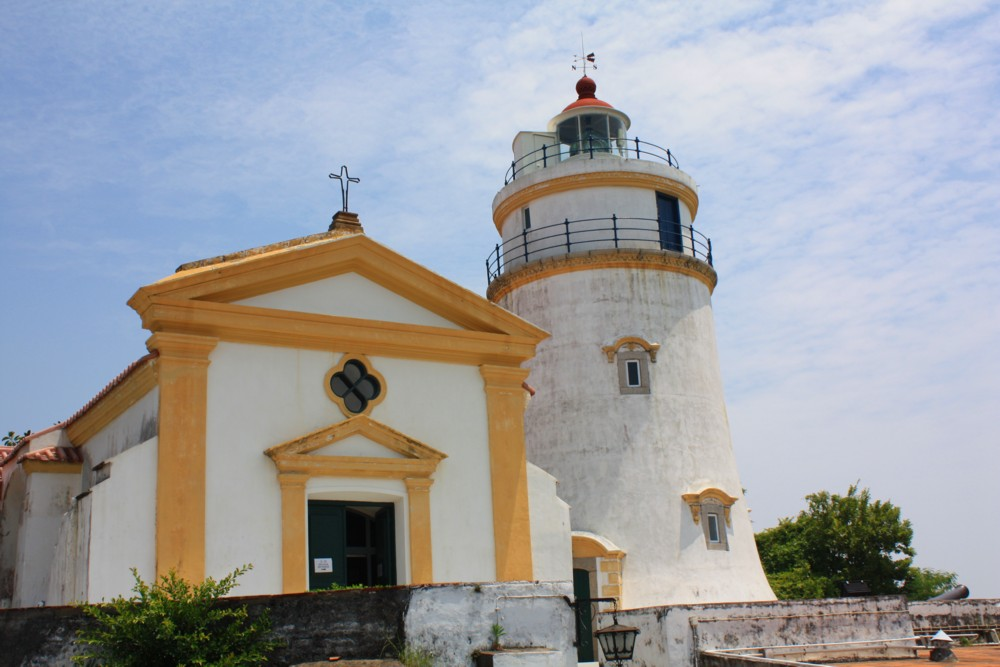
- Guia Fortress

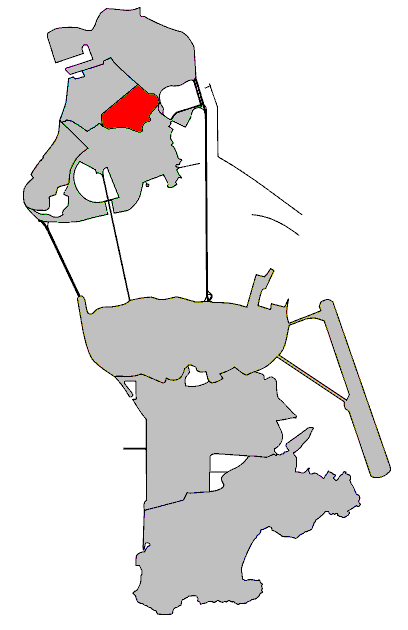
- Freguesia de São Lázaro in Macau
- Coordinates: 22°11′55″N 113°32′55″E
- Country: Macau
- Concelho: Concelho de Macau

Area
  - Total: 0.64 km^{2} (0.25 sq mi)

Population (2013)
  - Total: 33,100
  - Density: 52,000/km^{2} (130,000/sq mi)
  - Rank: 2
- Time zone: UTC+8 (Macau Standard)

São Lázaro

Chinese name
- Traditional Chinese: 望德堂區
- Simplified Chinese: 望德堂区
- Jyutping: Mong^{6} Dak^{1} Tong^{4} Koe^{1}
- Hanyu Pinyin: Wàngdé Tángqū
Transcriptions
Standard Mandarin
- Hanyu Pinyin: Wàngdé Tángqū
- Yale Romanization: Wàngdé Tángchyū
- IPA: [wâŋtɤ̌ tʰǎŋtɕʰý]
Yue: Cantonese
- Yale Romanization: Mohngdák Tòhngkeu
- Jyutping: Mong^{6} Dak^{1} Tong^{4} Koe^{1}
- IPA: [mɔ̀ːŋtɐ́k tʰɔ̏ːŋkʰœ́ː]

Portuguese name
- Portuguese: Freguesia de São Lázaro

São Lázaro is the smallest civil parish of Macau, located in the central-east region of the Macau Peninsula. It is surrounded by the parishes of Nossa Senhora de Fátima, Santo António, and Sé.

This parish was one of five in the former Municipality of Macau, one of Macau's two municipalities that were abolished on 31 December 2001 by Law No. 17/2001.(Portuguese: Colina da Guia, 松山 or 東望洋山). 3% of factories in Macau are located in the district.

== Education ==
Tertiary education:

- United Nations University Institute on Computing and Society

=== Primary and secondary schools ===
Public schools:

- Macao Conservatory - Headquarters and school of Music
  - The school of music is designated as a public secondary school programme.
- Escola Secundária Luso-Chinesa de Luís Gonzaga Gomes
- Escola Primária Oficial Luso-Chinesa "Sir Robert Ho Tung" (何東中葡小學) - Preschool, primary school, and special education
- Escola Primária Luso-Chinesa da Flora (二龍喉中葡小學)

Private tuition-free schools:

- Chan Sui Ki Perpetual Help College - Primary and secondary school
- Yuet Wah College - Preschool through secondary school
- Escola Kai Chi (啟智學校) - Special education

Private non-free schools:

- Pui Ching Middle School - Preschool through secondary school
- Jardim de Infância "D. José da Costa Nunes" (魯彌士主教幼稚園) - Preschool

=== Public library ===
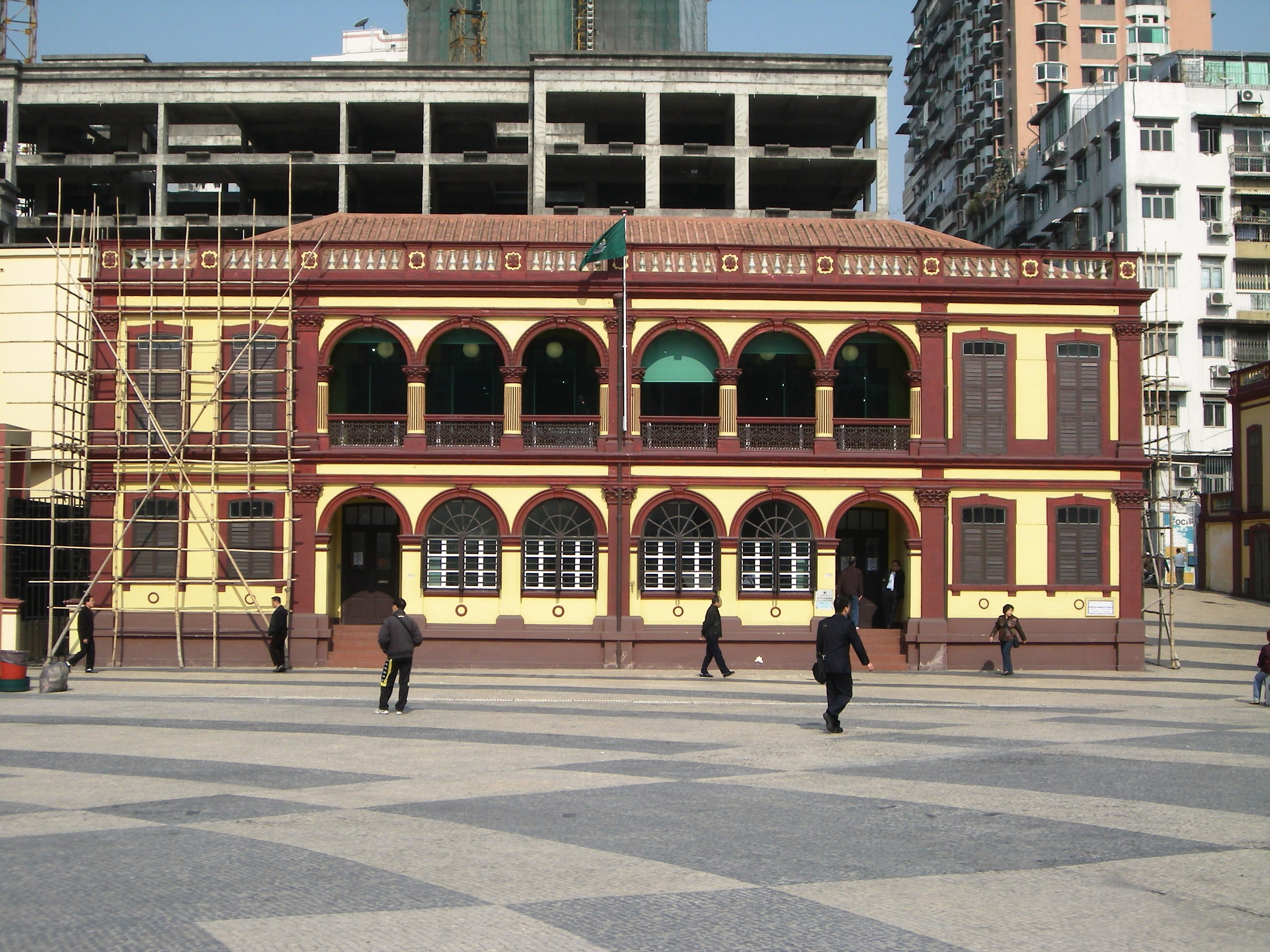
Macao Central Library

The parish is home to Macao Central Library, the main library of the Macao Public Library system.

== Healthcare ==
The Macau government operates the Centro de Saúde Macau Oriental (塔石衛生中心) in Tap Seac.

== Tourist attractions ==
=== Museums and facilities ===
- Archives of Macao
- Guia Fortress
- Macau Tea Culture House
- St. Lazarus' Church
- Sun Yat Sen Memorial House
- Tai Fung Tong Art House
- Tap Seac Multi-sports Pavilion

=== Garden and squares ===
- Tap Seac Square
- Vasco da Gama Garden
- Lou Lim Ieoc Garden
- Victory Garden
- Guia Municipal Park(松山市政公園)
- Guia Cable Car
- Jardim da Flora
- Guia Tunnel

=== Street ===
- Estrada de Cacilhas
- Avenida do Conselheiro Ferreira de Almeida

== See also ==
- Parishes of Macau
