= Museum of Taipa and Coloane History =

Museum in Taipa, Macau, China

- 路氹歷史館; Museu da História da Taipa e Coloane
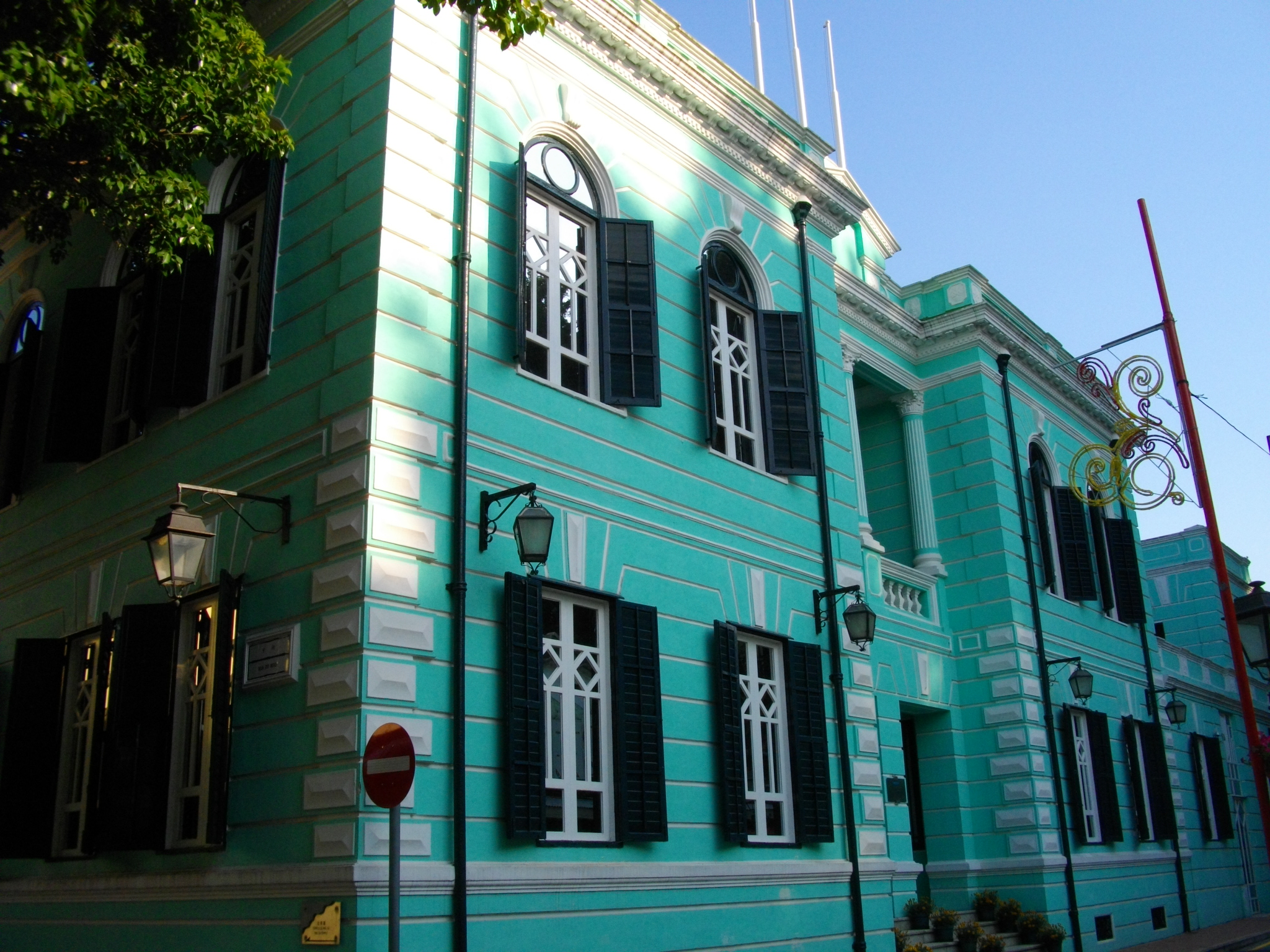
- Established: 7 May 2006
- Location: Taipa, Macau, China
- Coordinates: 22°12′11.8″N 113°33′17.6″E
- Type: museum

Museum of Taipa and Coloane History

Chinese name
- Traditional Chinese: 路氹歷史館
- Simplified Chinese: 路氹历史馆
Transcriptions
Standard Mandarin
- Hanyu Pinyin: Lù Dàng Lìshǐ Guǎn
Yue: Cantonese
- Jyutping: lou6 tam5 lik6 si2 gun2

Portuguese name
- Portuguese: Museu da História da Taipa e Coloane

The Museum of Taipa and Coloane History (Chinese: 路氹歷史館; Portuguese: Museu da História da Taipa e Coloane) is a museum in Taipa, Macau, China.

== History ==
The museum building used to be a public administration building named Island Municipal Council Building. It used to serve as the administrative center of the government of Portuguese Macau and played an important role in developing the area. In 2002, the building was renovated. Excavations were being done until 2004 around the building area. Basic preparation for exhibitions were done in 2005 and the renovation was finally completed in March 2006. The museum was opened on 7 May 2006.

== Architecture ==
The museum building is a 1920s green Portuguese building.

== Exhibitions ==
There are nine galleries in total inside the museum. On the first floor, the museum displays excavated relics and other artifacts. On the second floor, there are religious objects, handicrafts and architectural models.

== See also ==
- List of museums in Macau
