= Sir Robert Ho Tung Library =

Library in São Lourenço, Macau, China

Coordinates: 22°11′33″N 113°32′16″E

- Biblioteca Sir Robert Ho Tung 何東圖書館
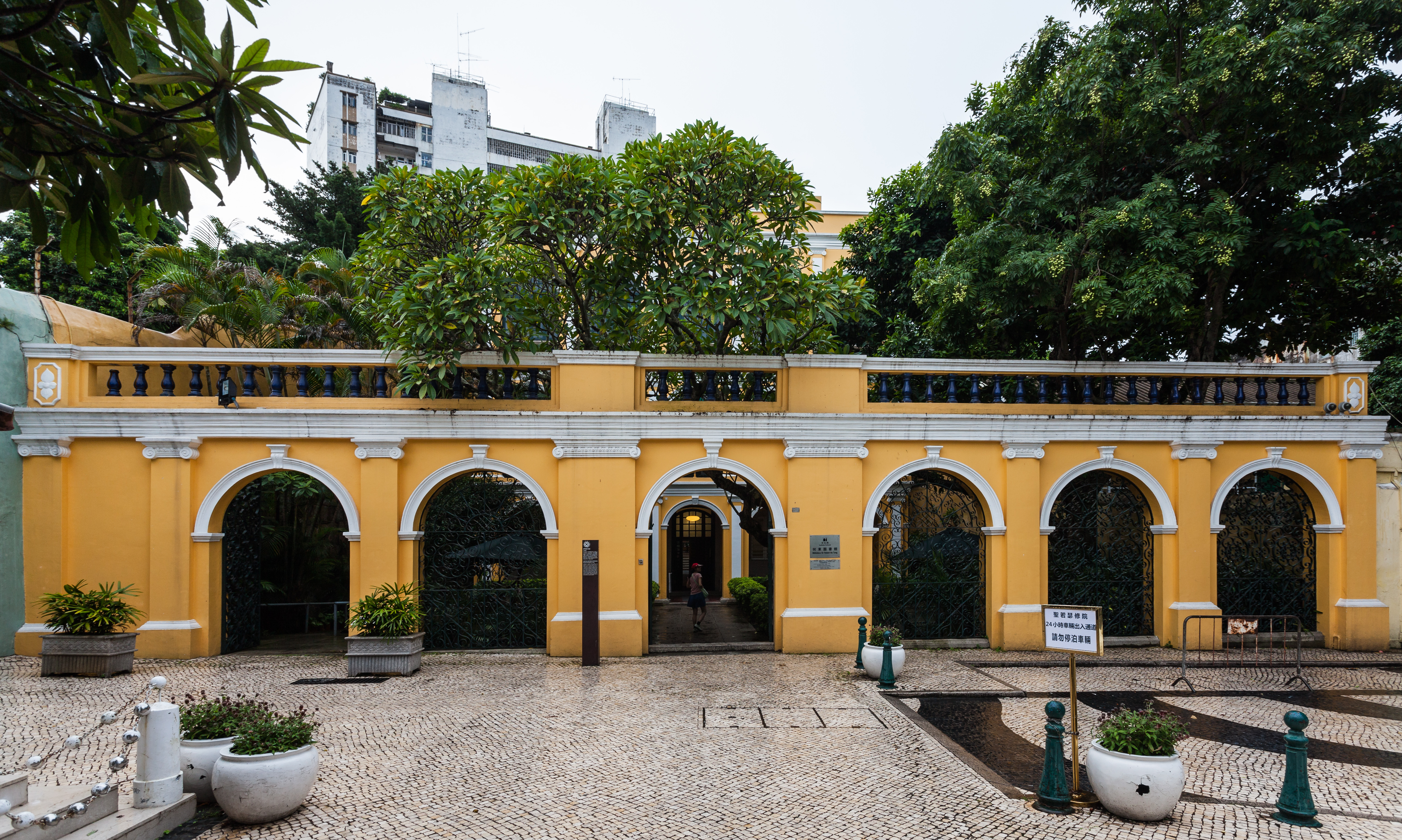
- Location: São Lourenço, Macau, China
- Type: Library
- Established: 1958

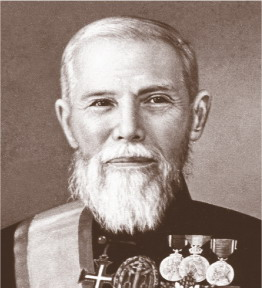
Sir Robert Ho Tung

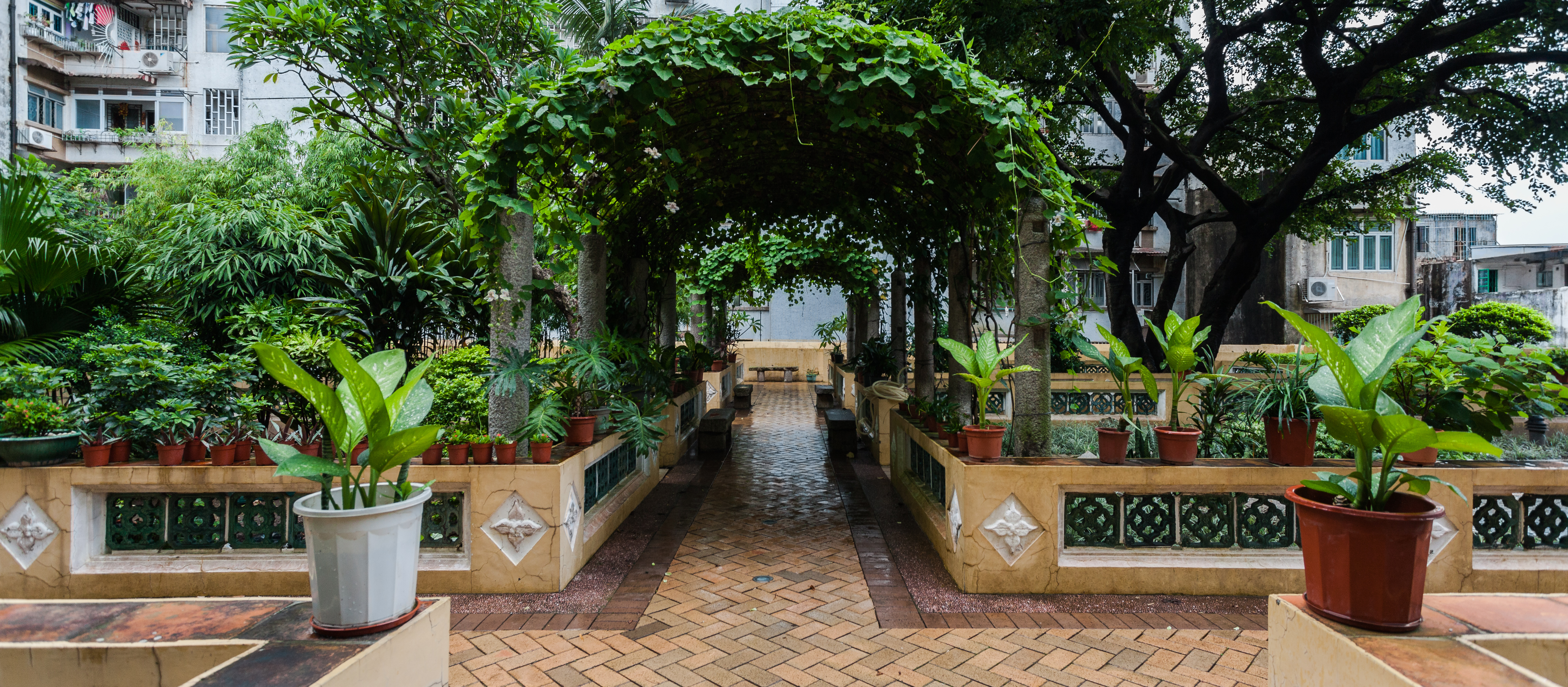
Gardens of the library.

Sir Robert Ho Tung Library

Chinese name
- Traditional Chinese: 何東圖書館
- Simplified Chinese: 何东图书馆
Transcriptions
Standard Mandarin
- Hanyu Pinyin: Hé Dōng Túshūguǎn
Yue: Cantonese
- Jyutping: ho4 dung1 tou4 syu1 gun2

Portuguese name
- Portuguese: Biblioteca Sir Robert Ho Tung

The Sir Robert Ho Tung Library (Portuguese: Biblioteca Sir Robert Ho Tung; Chinese: 何東圖書館) is a public library in São Lourenço, Macau, China. A part of the Macao Public Library system, is located in St. Augustine's Square in the Historic Centre of Macau, a UNESCO World Heritage Site. The library is housed in a mansion that has good historical, cultural and architectural value. The old building has the head office of the library system, located on the ground floor, and the offices of the Macao ISBN Agency, located on the second floor.

== History ==
The building was constructed before 1894 and was owned by Dona Carolina Cunha. Later the mansion was purchased by Hong Kong businessman Sir Robert Ho Tung in 1918 as a retreat and he lived there between 1941 and 1945 during the Japanese occupation of Hong Kong as the Japanese respected Portuguese neutrality in Macau. He died in 1955 and the building was presented to the Government for conversion to a public library in accordance with his will.

Sir Robert Ho Tung Library was officially opened in 1958 to the general public. In 2005, a new building was constructed near the back garden of the mansion, making the library the biggest public library in Macau.

== See also ==
- List of oldest buildings and structures in Macau
- List of libraries in China
