= Archives of Macao =

General archive in São Lázaro, Macau

- 澳門檔案館 (Chinese); Arquivo de Macau (Portuguese)
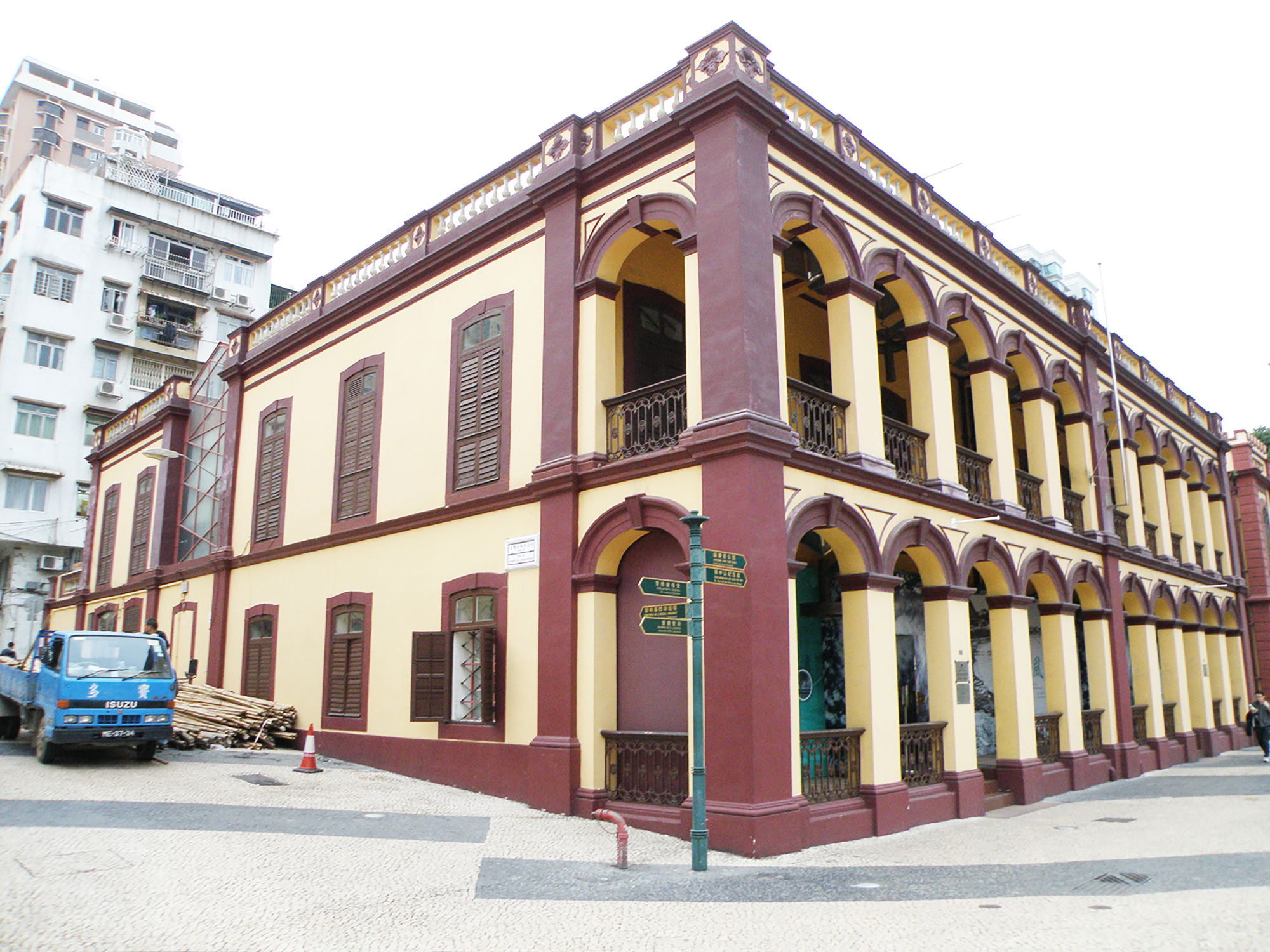

General information
- Type: Archive
- Location: São Lázaro, Macau, China
- Coordinates: 22°11′55.5″N 113°32′49.2″E
- Opened: 1952

Website
- Official website

Archives of Macao

Chinese name
- Traditional Chinese: 澳門檔案館
- Simplified Chinese: 澳门档案馆
Transcriptions
Standard Mandarin
- Hanyu Pinyin: Àomén Dàng'ànguǎn
Yue: Cantonese
- Jyutping: ou3 mun4*2 dong2 on3 gun2

Macao General Archives
- Traditional Chinese: 澳門總檔案室
- Simplified Chinese: 澳门总档案馆
Transcriptions
Standard Mandarin
- Hanyu Pinyin: Àomén Zǒng Dàng'ànguǎn
Yue: Cantonese
- Jyutping: ou3 mun4*2 zung2 dong2 on3 gun2

Historical Archives of Macao
- Traditional Chinese: 澳門歷史檔案室
- Simplified Chinese: 澳门历史档案馆
Transcriptions
Standard Mandarin
- Hanyu Pinyin: Àomén Lìshǐ Dàng'ànguǎn
Yue: Cantonese
- Jyutping: ou3 mun4*2 lik6 si2 dong2 on3 gun2

Portuguese name
- Portuguese: Arquivo de Macau (Formerly Arquivo Geral de Macau and Arquivo Histórico de Macau)

The Archives of Macao (Chinese: 澳門檔案館; Portuguese: Arquivo de Macau) is a general archive in São Lázaro, Macau. It collects, processes, protects and make available records pertaining Macau.

== History ==
The Archives of Macao was founded as Macao General Archives (Arquivo Geral de Macau; 澳門總檔案室) on 28 June 1952. In 1979, it was renamed as Historical Archives of Macao (Arquivo Histórico de Macau; 澳門歷史檔案室). In 2016, it was renamed to Archives of Macao.

== Architecture ==
The archive is housed in a mansion with colonial style architecture. It was then restored by the Government of Macau.

== Collections ==
The archive has more than 50,000 files, 70,000 photos and 10,000 publications.

== See also ==
- List of tourist attractions in Macau
- History of Macau
