= Macao Central Library =

Library of the Macao Public Library system, in São Lázaro, Macau

Coordinates: 22.19868772663515°N 113.54730582246437°E

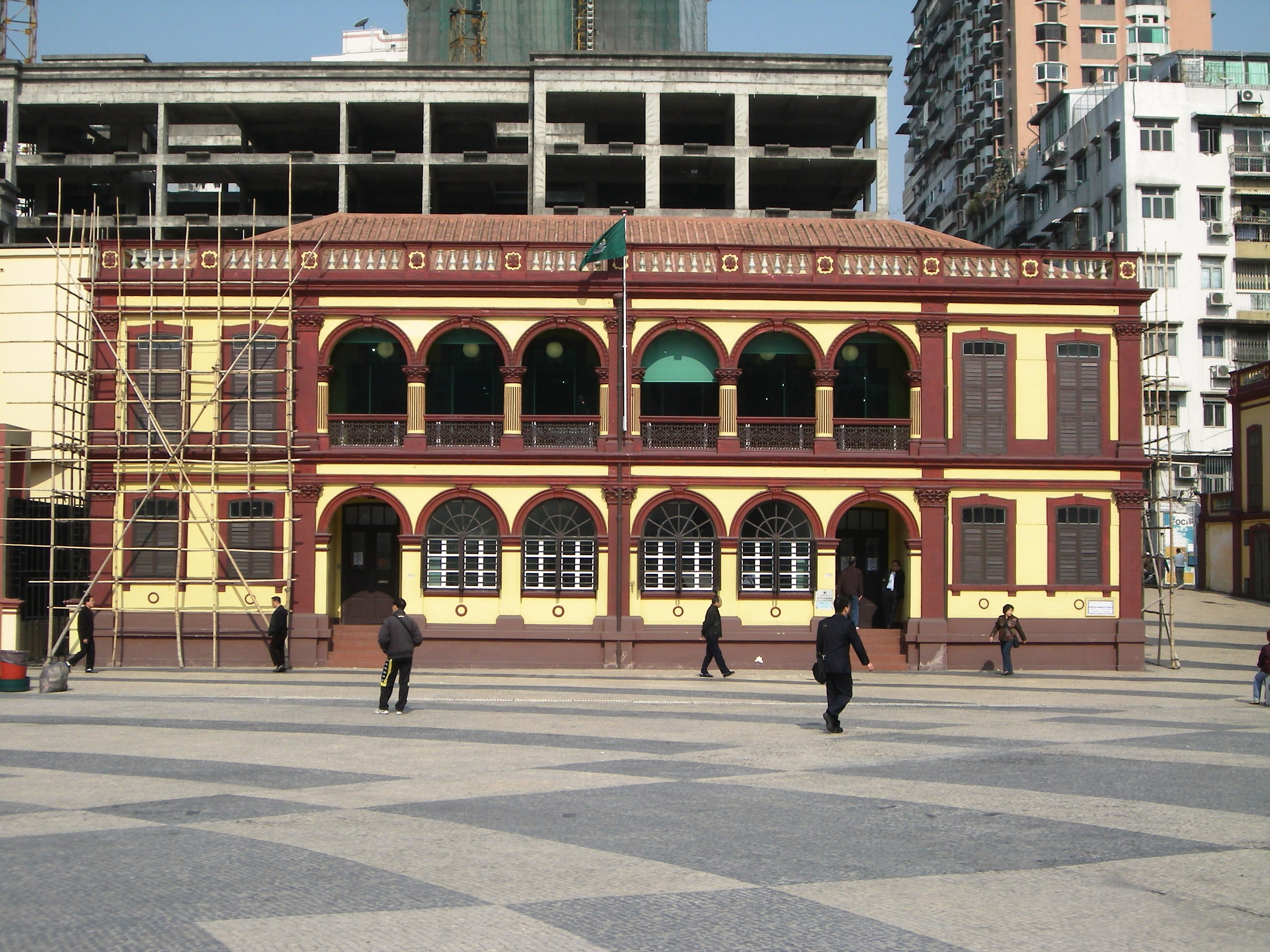

Chinese name
- Traditional Chinese: 澳門中央圖書館
- Simplified Chinese: 澳门中央图书馆
Transcriptions
Standard Mandarin
- Hanyu Pinyin: Àomén Zhōngyāng Túshūguǎn
Yue: Cantonese
- Jyutping: ou3 mun4*2 zung1 joeng1 tou4 syu1 gun2

Portuguese name
- Portuguese: Biblioteca Central de Macau

The Macao Central Library (Chinese: 澳門中央圖書館; Portuguese: Biblioteca Central de Macau) is a library of the Macao Public Library system, in São Lázaro (Saint Lazarus Parish), Macau.

== History ==
On 28 September 1895, the National Library of Macau, initially a part of the Liceu de Macau, the Lusophone high school of Portuguese Macau, was first established in St. Augustine's Church. The Portuguese government had announced two years earlier that it wished to establish a library facility in Macau.

The Cultural Affairs Bureau stated that initially "the Library existed in name only and was often relocated" since there were scant resources; in 1917 the library was transferred to the St. Joseph's Seminary, and it subsequently moved to the Hotel Bela Vista and the Shelter for the Disabled at Tap Seac.

In 1929 the library moved again, to two rooms, inside the IACM Building, then known as the Leal Senado Building. It moved to its Avenida do Conselheiro Ferreira de Almeida site in 1983. It received its current name in 1994, and that site received an interior renovation in the beginning part of 2007. That year, the Macau government announced that a replacement facility would be built.

In 2018 the company MAA Marreiros Architectural Atelier Limited, owned by Carlos Marreiros, won the government contract to build the new central library, which was to be built at the old 1951 courthouse. The estimated cost would be 18.68 million patacas. Several publications accused Marreiros of copying the design of the auditorium of Leon, Spain. Marreiros denied the accusation.

In 2020 the plan to convert the old courthouse into the new central library was reported to be abandoned. Instead, the site of the new central library is planned to be the former Hotel Estoril at Tap Seac Square. In 2021 it was announced that the Dutch architecture firm Mecanoo would be designing the new library.

== Facility ==
The 1,371-square-metre (14,760 sq ft), two storey facility is located on Avenida do Conselheiro Ferreira de Almeida. It has about 92,606 volumes and seating for 271 patrons.

A new eleven storey central library was scheduled to be built on the block at the intersection of Avenida da Praia Grande and Rua Central, which would replace the former Judicial Police head office and hang over the existing 1951 courthouse, which was to be preserved. The planned building was to have a seating capacity for 1,120 patrons in the primary reading areas and 800 patrons in exhibition and meeting areas, theatre areas, and other supplementary portions. However, it was reported in 2020 that the plan to convert the old courthouse into the new central library was abandoned.

== See also ==
- List of libraries in China
