= Flora Garden =

Park in São Lázaro, Macau

- Jardim da Flora
- 二龍喉公園
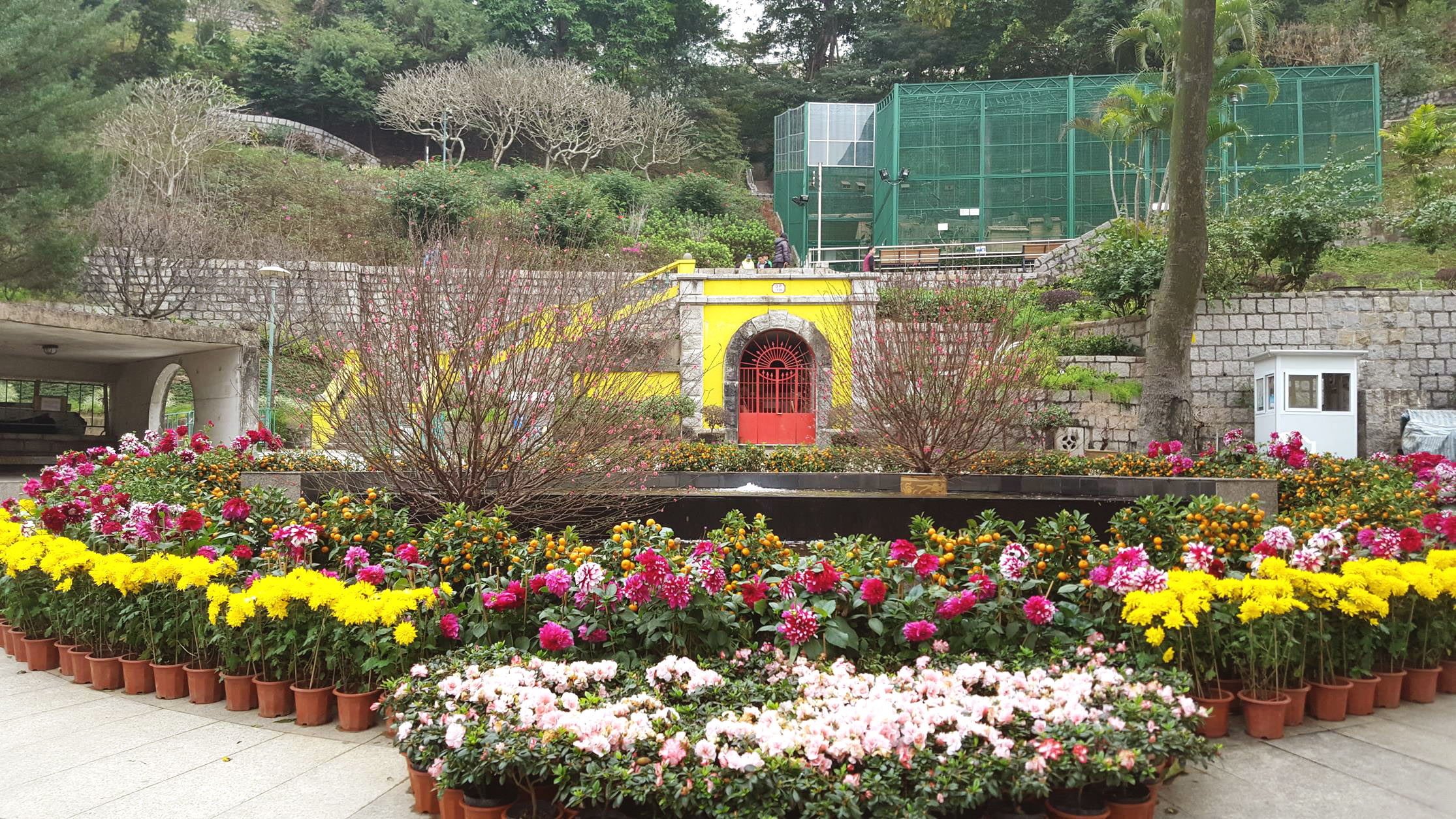
- Interactive map of Flora Garden
- Type: flower garden
- Location: São Lázaro, Macau
- Coordinates: 22°12′01.0″N 113°33′5.2″E

Flora Garden

Chinese name
- Traditional Chinese: 二龍喉公園
- Simplified Chinese: 二龙喉公园
Transcriptions
Standard Mandarin
- Hanyu Pinyin: Èrlónghóu Gōngyuán
Yue: Cantonese
- Jyutping: ji6 lung4 hau4 gung1 jyun4*2

Portuguese name
- Portuguese: Jardim da Flora

The Flora Garden (Chinese: 二龍喉公園; Portuguese: Jardim da Flora) is a flower garden in São Lázaro, Macau. The garden is located at the foothill of Guia Hill. It is Macau's largest public park.

== History ==
The garden used to be the ground for Flora Palace, a mansion during the Portuguese Macau era.

== Attractions ==
The garden consists of an aviary, small zoo and patio. It also has flowerbeds, small waterfalls and belvedere.

== See also ==
- List of tourist attractions in Macau
