= Luís de Camões Garden =

Public park in Macau, China

Coordinates: 22.2005°N 113.5393°E

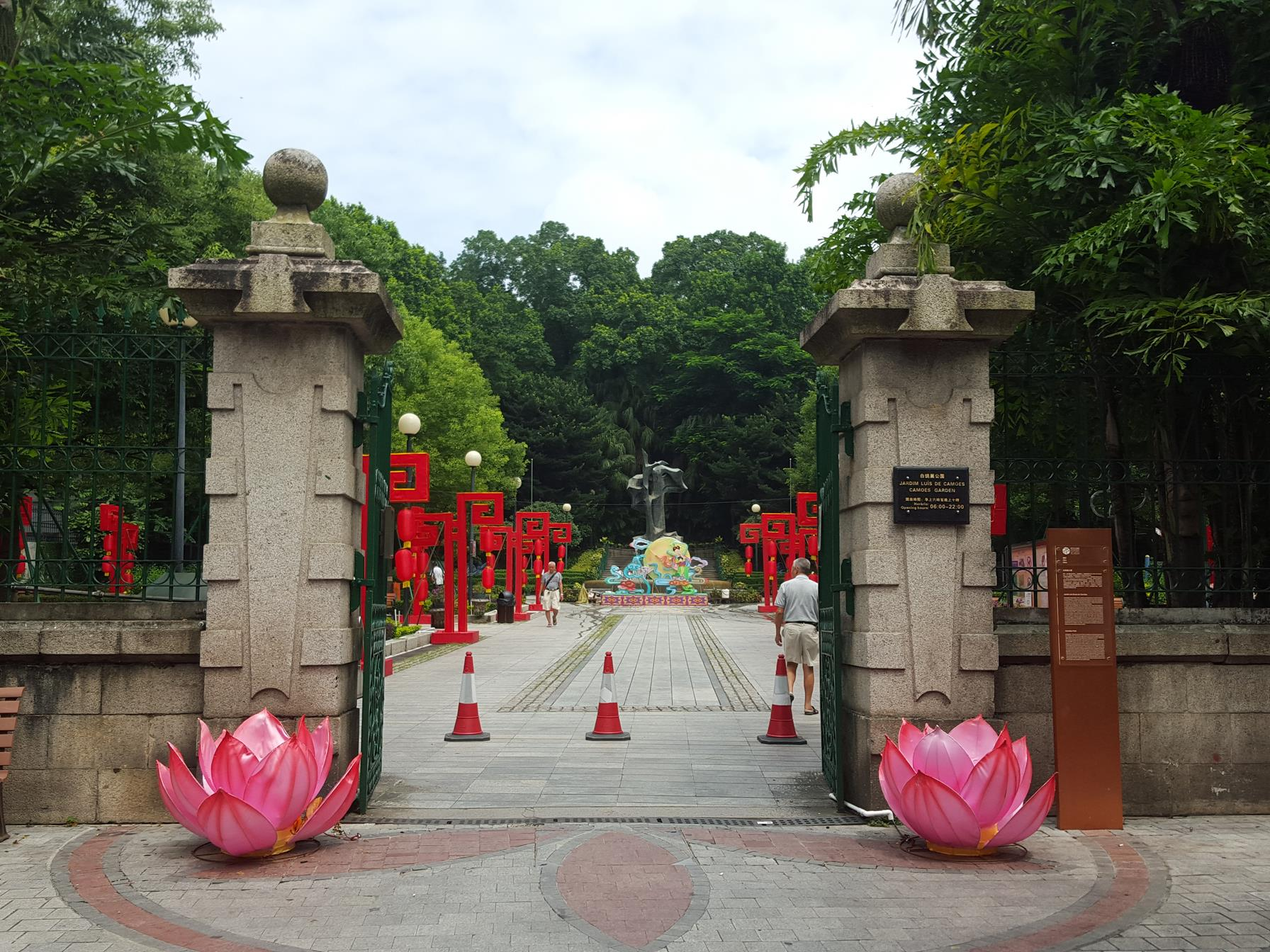
- Entrance of Camões Garden

Chinese name
- Traditional Chinese: 白鴿巢公園
- Simplified Chinese: 白鸽巢公园
- Literal meaning: (White) Pigeon/Dove Nest Park
Transcriptions
Standard Mandarin
- Hanyu Pinyin: Báigēcháo Gōngyuán
Yue: Cantonese
- Jyutping: baak6 gap3 caau4 gung1 jyun4*2

Portuguese name
- Portuguese: Jardim de Luís de Camões

Luís de Camões Garden (Chinese: 白鴿巢公園, Portuguese: Jardim de Luís de Camões) is a public park in Santo António, Macau. Established in the 19th century on the grounds of a former 18th-century estate, the garden spans over 26,063 square metres (280,540 sq ft). Once home to the British East India Company's Macau headquarters, it was later converted into a public park featuring a grotto dedicated to the Portuguese poet Luís de Camões. Adjacent landmarks include Casa Garden and the Old Protestant Cemetery, both part of Macau's UNESCO World Heritage Site.

== Overview ==
Covering an area of approximately 26,063 square metres (280,540 sq ft), the garden is open daily from 06:00 to 24:00 with free admission. It is accessible via public bus routes and serves as a green space in the densely urbanized environment of Macau. Referred to as a "small oasis" or the "lungs of the city", the garden offers a tranquil environment for leisure and reflection. Among the 34 public gardens in Macau, it is the oldest park in the territory.

== History ==
The site's origins trace back to the 18th century, when it formed part of the estate of a wealthy Portuguese merchant. By the late 18th century, the property was leased to East India Company, serving as the residence of the president of its Select Committee. The garden flourished during this period, and notable figures such as Lord George Macartney, who led a diplomatic mission to China in 1793, were among its guests.

The English vacated the site in 1835. Shortly thereafter, the Portuguese owner installed a grotto dedicated to the poet Luís de Camões. The government of Macau purchased the property in 1885 for 35,000 patacas, transforming it into a public garden the following year. The acquisition was supported by João Scarnichia, then Captain of the Port of Macau, and approved by Governor Tomás de Sousa Rosa.

Historically, the site was known as Colina da Fénix ("Phoenix Hill"). Among the Chinese population, it was referred to as Pak Kap Chau (Chinese: 白鴿巢). Adjacent to the garden is Casa Garden, formerly the residence of the East India Company administrator. It later housed the Luís de Camões Commercial and Ethnographic Museum (1937–1989) and now serves as the headquarters of the Fundação Oriente and an art gallery. Together with the Old Protestant Cemetery, it forms part of Macau's UNESCO World Heritage Site.

== See also ==
- List of oldest buildings and structures in Macau
