= Lou Lim Ioc Garden =

Garden in São Lázaro, Macau

Coordinates: 22.200026°N 113.547440°E

- Chinese: 盧廉若公園; Portuguese: Jardim de Lou Lim Ioc
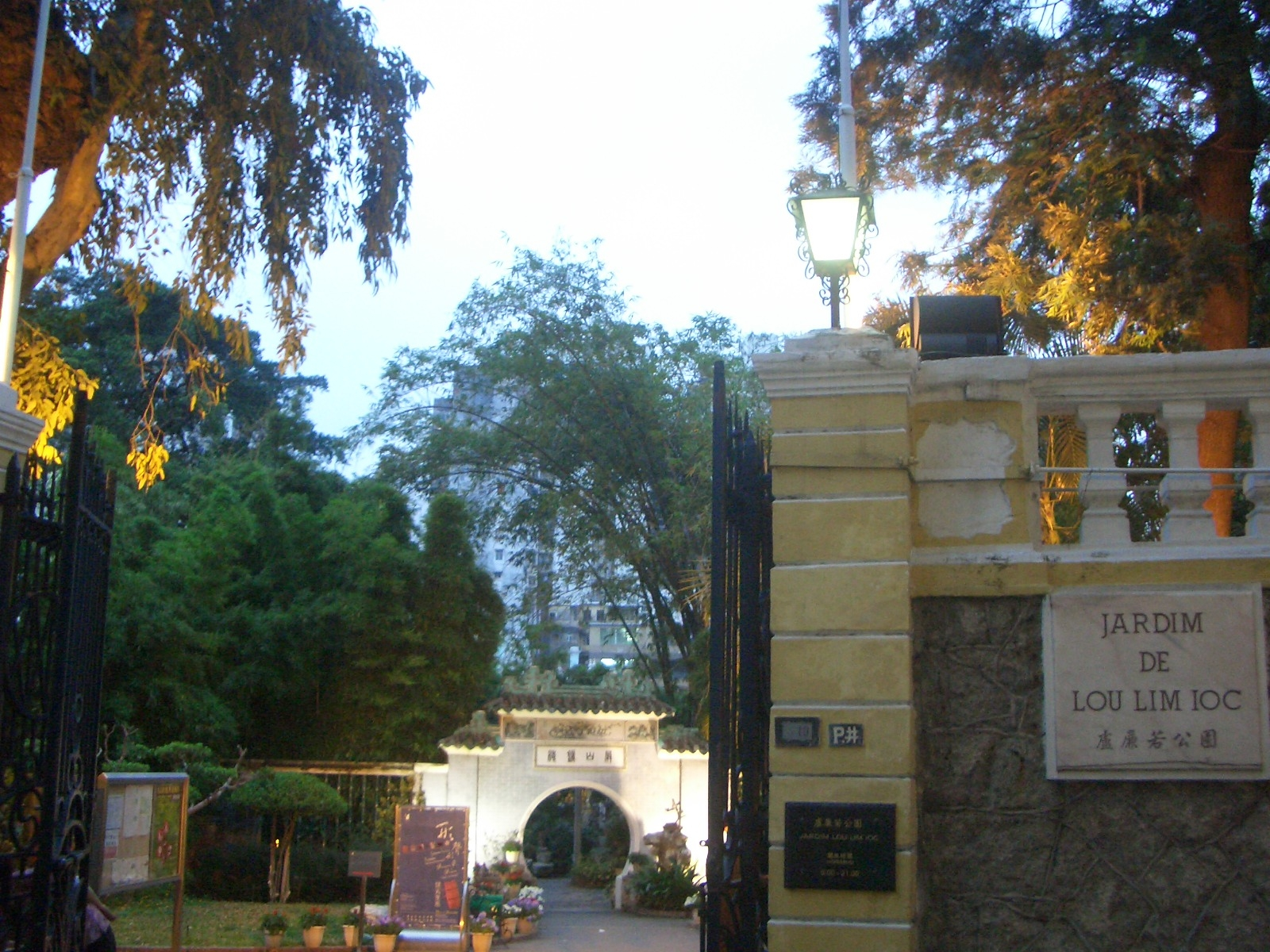
- Interactive map of Lou Lim Ioc Garden
- Type: Garden
- Location: São Lázaro, Macau, China
- Created: 1906
- Owner: Government of Macau

Lou Lim Ioc Garden

Chinese name
- Traditional Chinese: 盧廉若公園
- Simplified Chinese: 卢廉若公园
Transcriptions
Standard Mandarin
- Hanyu Pinyin: Lú Liánruò Gōngyuán
Yue: Cantonese
- Jyutping: lou4 lim4 joek6 gung1 jyun4*2

Portuguese name
- Portuguese: Jardim de Lou Lim Ioc

Lou Lim Ioc Garden (Chinese: 盧廉若公園; Portuguese: Jardim de Lou Lim Ioc) is a garden in São Lázaro in Macau. Built in 1906 by local merchant Lou Kau as part of his residence, the garden has a design that follows the well-known Suzhou Gardens. It was turned over to the Macau government in 1974 as a public park, which is popular with local inhabitants.

== See also ==
- List of tourist attractions in Macau
