= Landscape crisis of the Guia Fortress =

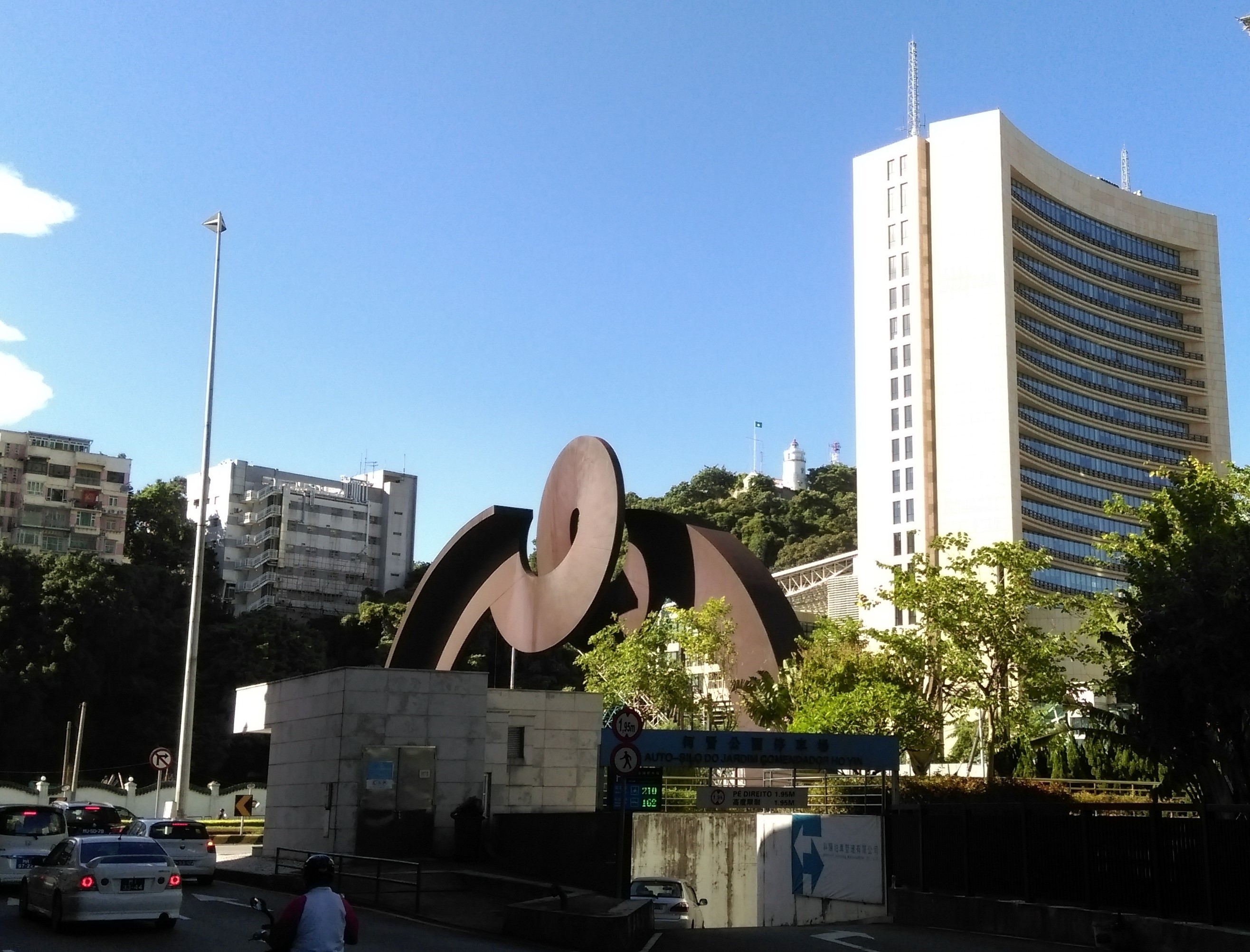
The Guia Fortress obstructed by the Liaison Office of the Central People's Government in the Macao Special Administrative Region Building (Lot 136), 2017

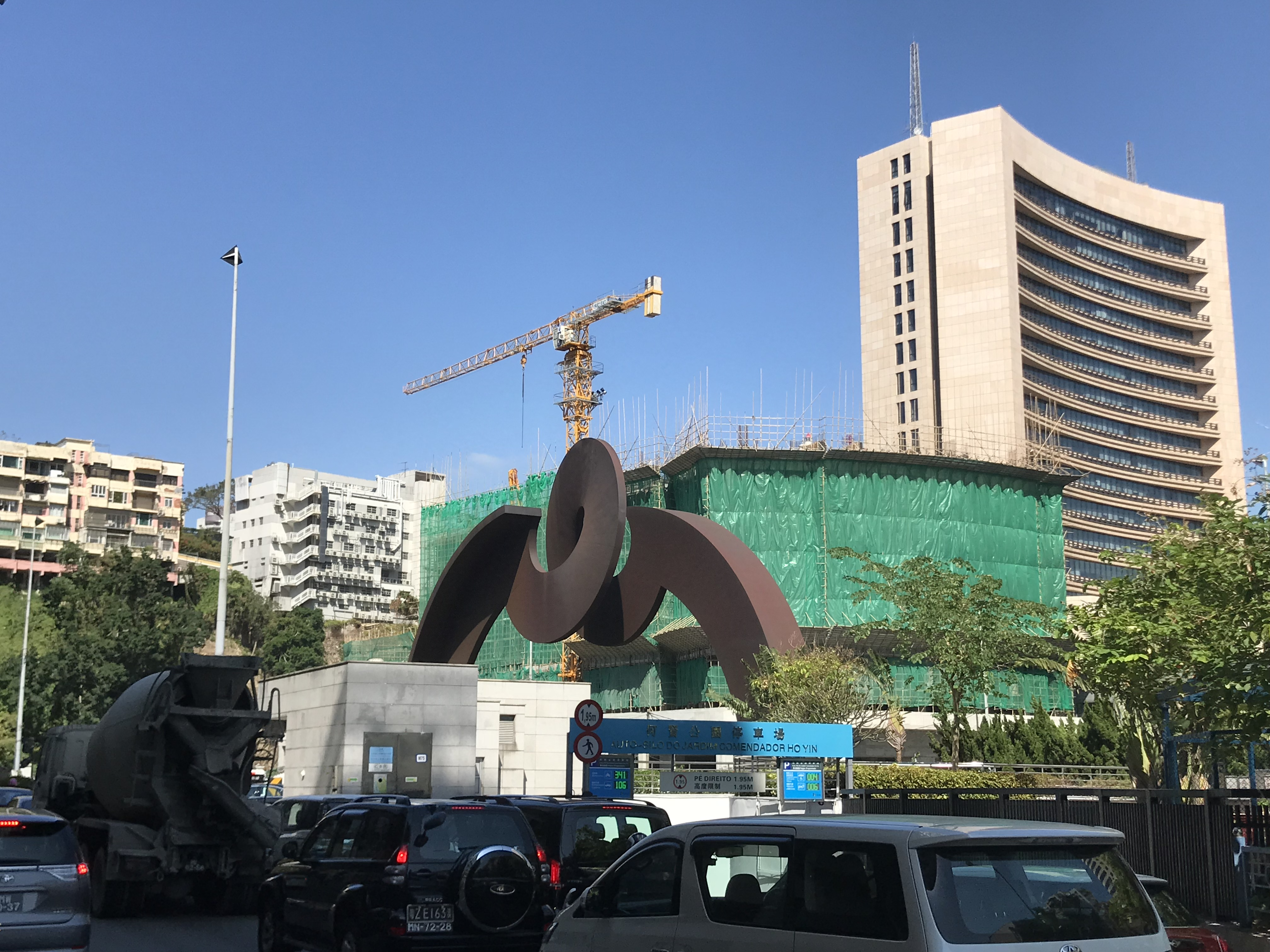
In 2018, in the same direction, the fortress has been completely blocked by the Liaison Office building (Lot 136) and the high-rise project under construction (Lot 135, land granted to Standing Committee of the National Committee of the Chinese People's Political Consultative Conference, member of the Executive Council of the Macao Special Administrative Region and Chancellor of the Macau University of Science and Technology, Lio Chak Wan)

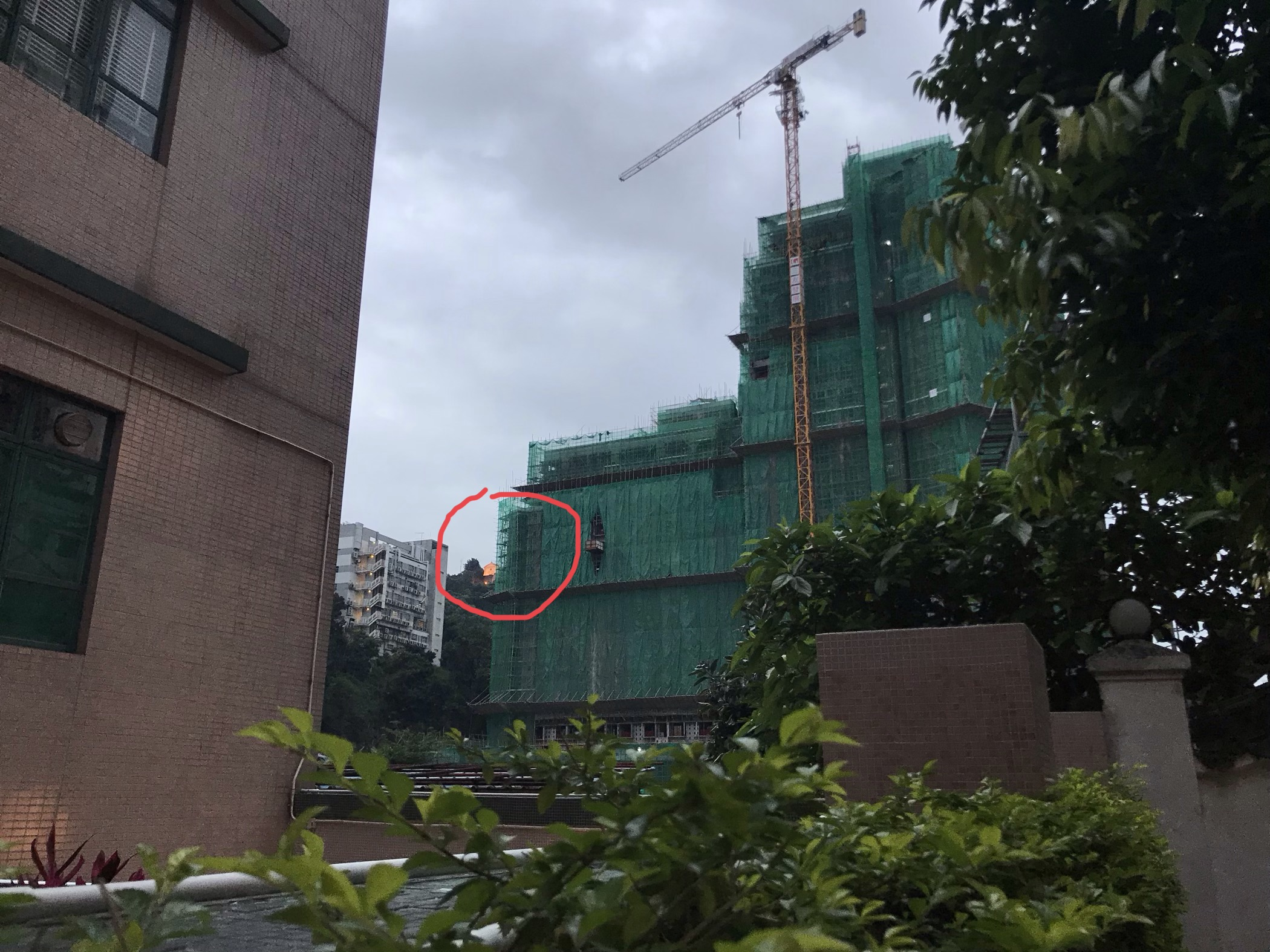
In 2019, an extensive "fence" of 90 meters in height is being formed near the Guia Fortress (about 90 meters above sea level).

The landscape crisis of the Guia Fortress refers to the landscape conservation crisis of the Guia Fortress, a part of the Historic Centre of Macau and a symbol of the city. This current crisis represents a threat to Macau's World Cultural Heritage.

In 2005, the Guia Fortress was inscribed on the World Heritage Site as part of the Historic Centre of Macau. In the same year, the Macau Special Administrative Region (MSAR) of the People's Republic of China repealed "The Outer Harbor and New Land Reclamation Urban Planning Charter" and "The Bylaws of South Bay Reorganization", two ordinances for the protection of the local World Heritage Site, which designate the area around the Penha Hill as free land for development and approve the construction of tall buildings around the Guia Fortress causing damage to the landscape, some of which will be much taller than Penha Hill when completed, undermining the Fortress' World Heritage status. The incident has aroused concern from all walks of life, and some civil groups have initiated a series of activities to stop the construction of super-tall buildings around Penha Hill. As of 2018, except for the Macau Liaison Office building, which was completed, other controversial projects are either in the planning stage, under construction, or on hold.

The Government of Macau has been criticized for its handling of the issue, and the incident has drawn the attention of the UNESCO World Heritage Committee, which has intervened in the investigation and issued a warning to the Macau authorities, while some voices in the community have criticized the Liaison Office for taking the lead in destroying the world's cultural heritage. In 2007, Macau residents sent a letter to UNESCO, pointing out that the construction of the Liaison Office building, among other projects, was damaging the view of the Guia Fortress, a World Heritage Site. UNESCO subsequently issued a warning to the Macau government, and the former Macau Chief Executive Edmund Ho later signed the Chief Executive's Instruction No. 83/2008 (commonly known as the "Height Restriction Instruction") which restricted the height of the buildings around the Guia Fortress. However, compared to the Macau-Portugal period before "The Outer Harbor and New Land Reclamation Urban Planning Charter" and "The Bylaws of South Bay Reorganization" were repealed by the MSAR, the height restriction was actually expanded. It was criticized that the height of buildings within the 2.8 square kilometers of the fortress area was enlarged, with more than half of the height restriction area covered by buildings above the 75-meter height. In addition, although the Liaison Office conceded to lower the planned height of 99.9 meters to 88 meters, the view of the fortress was also severely damaged (according to the "height restriction instructions", the height restriction of the Liaison Office building is 90 meters), which led the property developers to follow and do the same.

With the rapid economic development and the exuberant real property market in Macau, many new buildings have been constructed, which have damaged the environment and landscape of the World Heritage Site to varying degrees. The Guia Fortress on Penha Hill is now surrounded by many high-rise buildings below the hill, and if various uncompleted high-rise projects are completed in the future, the view of the Guia Fortress will be further damaged. In contrast to many scenic spots outside of Macau that have adopted building height restrictions to preserve the original landscape of the area, the Macau government has been criticized for doing the opposite, violating the public's expectation of preserving the scenic beauty of the World Heritage Site, and making people question the Macau Cultural Affairs Bureau for being afraid to speak up for fear of the powerful. The case of Guia Fortress is proof that the Government of Macau has neglected the protection of cultural heritage in urban planning, as commented by Chen Mingkou, a professor at Stanford University, and Yu Yong Yi, a professor at the University of Macau.

== Historical background ==
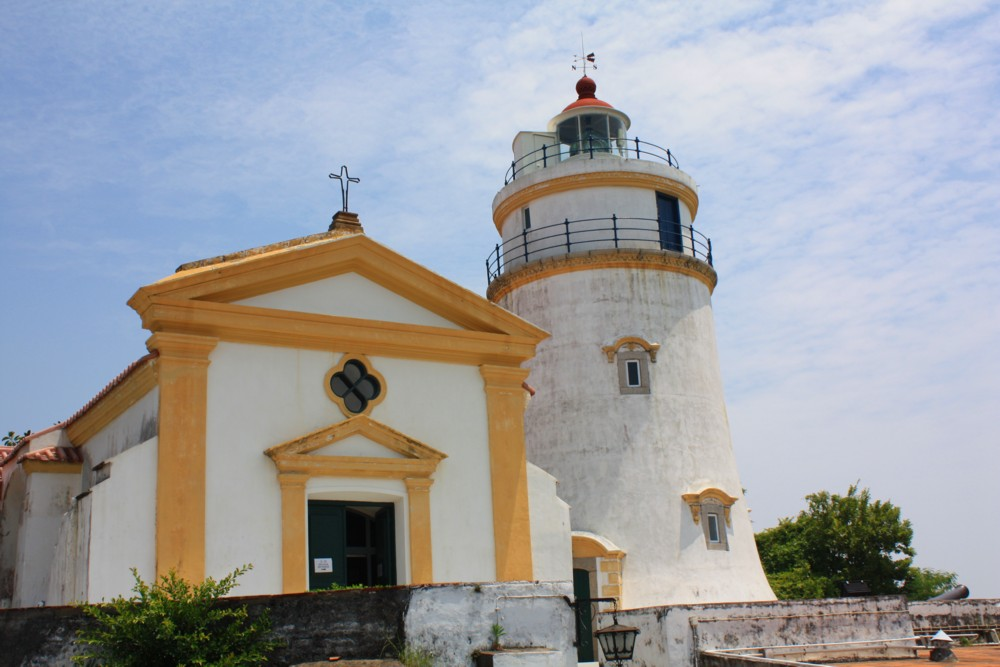
Guia Fortress is one of the symbols of Macau

The Guia Fortress (commonly known as Penha Hill Lighthouse) is located on the hilltop of Penha Hill in the Macau Peninsula. It was built in 1864 during the third year of the Tongzhi era of the Qing dynasty and designed by Carlos Vincente Da Rocha, a native Portuguese of Macau. It is the oldest lighthouse in the coastal region of China and is a symbol of Macau as it is located on the world map.

In 1992, Guia Fortress was selected as one of the "Eight Views of Macau" and in 2005, it was inscribed on the World Heritage Site as part of the Historic Centre of Macau.

== Landscape features ==
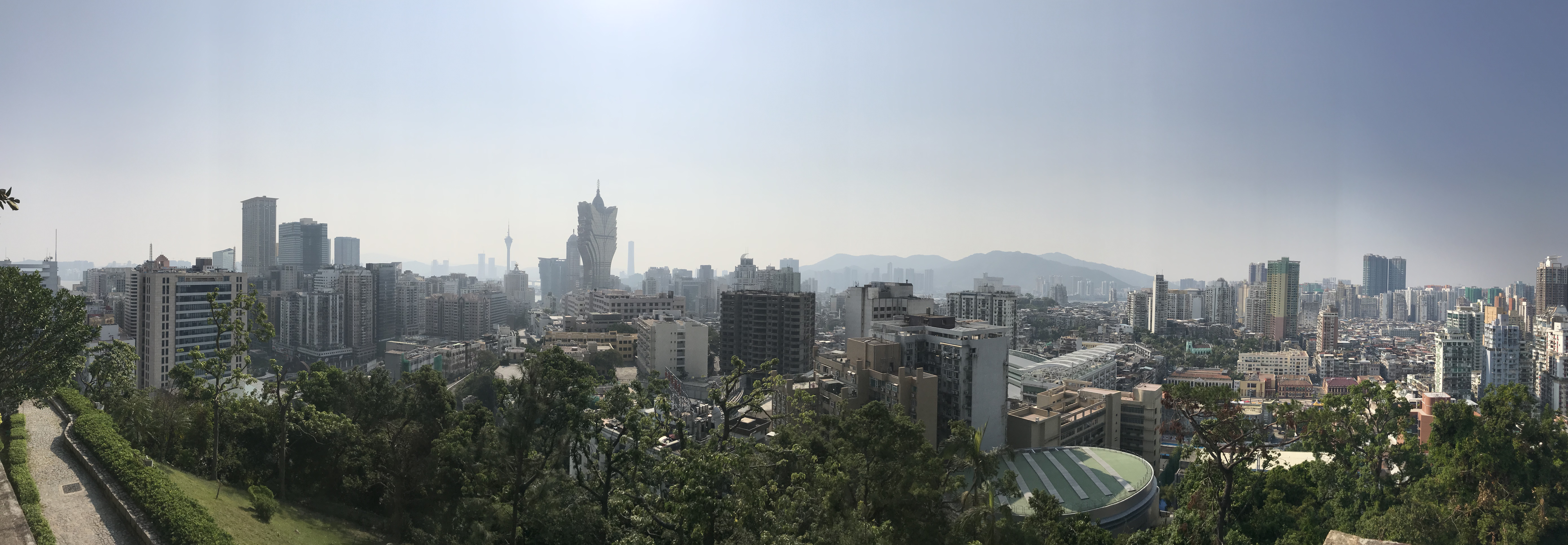
From Penha Hill, you can overlook almost the entire Macau Peninsula

Guia Fortress and Lighthouse are located at the highest point of Penha Hill, the highest peak of the Macau Peninsula, from where you can see almost the entire peninsula. According to Lui Chak Keong, a member of the Macau Cultural Heritage Committee and a qualified architect of the List of World Heritage Sites in France, a building under landscape protection involves two types of views: "the view from the base of the building to the exterior" and "the view of the building from a viewpoint of special significance located outside the building". He points out that one of the features of European medieval and Renaissance town design is the specific visual connection between the military fortress and the city streets, that visual connection is mainly due to military defense and urban surveillance, and that the historical Macau city also has the above-mentioned European town design features. The Guia Lighthouse and Guia Fortress, which are located far away from the city, still maintain an important visual connection before the modern expansion of the city. He also pointed out that in the preservation of the historic city district, in addition to restrictions on the height of the surrounding buildings, "view corridors" should also be developed.

Some of the more important viewpoints are around Avenida do Doutor Rodrigo Rodrigues to the south of the Guia Fortress, the Tap Seac Square to the north of the fortress, and the Lotus Square to the southeast, where the view of the Guia Fortress from Avenida do Doutor Rodrigo Rodrigues at the foot of the southern hill is connected to the mountain and the front façade of the sanctuary of Our Lady of the Snows next to the lighthouse, which lacks other visual connections, but this unique viewpoint has been almost destroyed by the new high-rise buildings around Avenida do Doutor Rodrigo Rodrigues.

The 29th World Heritage Committee meeting in 2005 commented that "Macau is an example of an outstanding architectural complex that has witnessed the development of the East meets West civilization over the past 450 years, and the successful integration of urban space and architectural complexes has demonstrated the footprints of history." In particular, the Committee recommended that Macau "should make every effort to develop a management system that preserves the existing structural and visual integrity as well as protects the primary vision of the nominated area in a modern context".

== Landscape crisis ==
In the same year the Guia Fortress was inscribed on the World Heritage Site, the Macau government, without any public consultation and explanation, repealed Order 68/91/M "The Outer Harbor and New Land Reclamation Urban Planning Charter" and Order 69/91/M "The Bylaws of South Bay Reorganization", allowing the construction of a cluster of super-tall buildings with a minimum height of 90 meters on seven lots in the area of Avenida do Dr. Rodrigo Rodrigues at an altitude of only 91 meters above sea level, damaging the view of the Fortress and causing concern and warnings from various sectors, including the United Nations Educational, Scientific and Cultural Organization.

=== Monitoring indicators ===
According to the World Heritage Centre, all its inscriptions after 1998 must list the relevant monitoring elements of the World Heritage Site. This measure has prompted the States Parties to pay attention to the fixed and variable monitoring indicators implied by the different heritage types in their countries, and the key indicators for assessing the state of conservation of the "Historic Centre of Macau" are as follows (one of the monitored variables, "changes in the surrounding environment", has been discontinued):

- The state of maintenance of historical authenticity
- External modifications and changes
- Structural stability
- Infiltration
- Climate
- Partial or total replacement or damage
- Historical authenticity of restoration materials
- Changes in the surrounding environment

Some civic groups have criticized that not only has the landscape around the city not been maintained and improved, but on the contrary, since the Macau government withdrew the orders that had a protective effect on the World Heritage Site, high-rise buildings have been built around the Guia Fortress that affect the view of it, and according to the UNESCO report, two factors are affecting Macau's World Heritage: "the potential negative impact of construction works in the area surrounding the buffer" and "the lack of a proper management system".

=== Super high-rise controversy ===
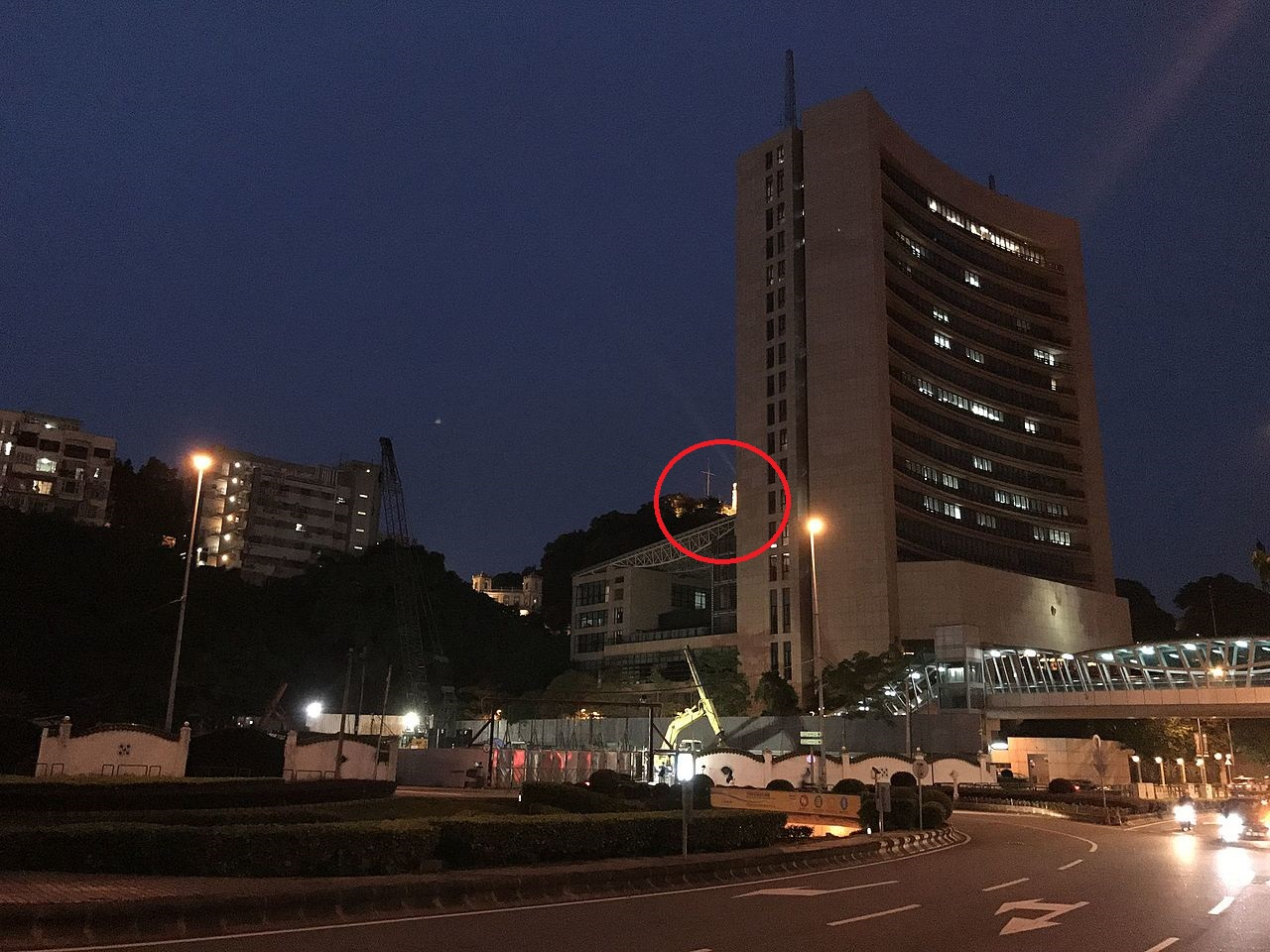
In the 2017, the view of the Guia Fortress from Avenida do Doutor Rodrigo Rodrigues was almost blocked by the Macau Liaison Office building (Lot 136), and the construction of the 85.20-meter tall building (Lot 135) next to the building will further damage the view of the lighthouse.

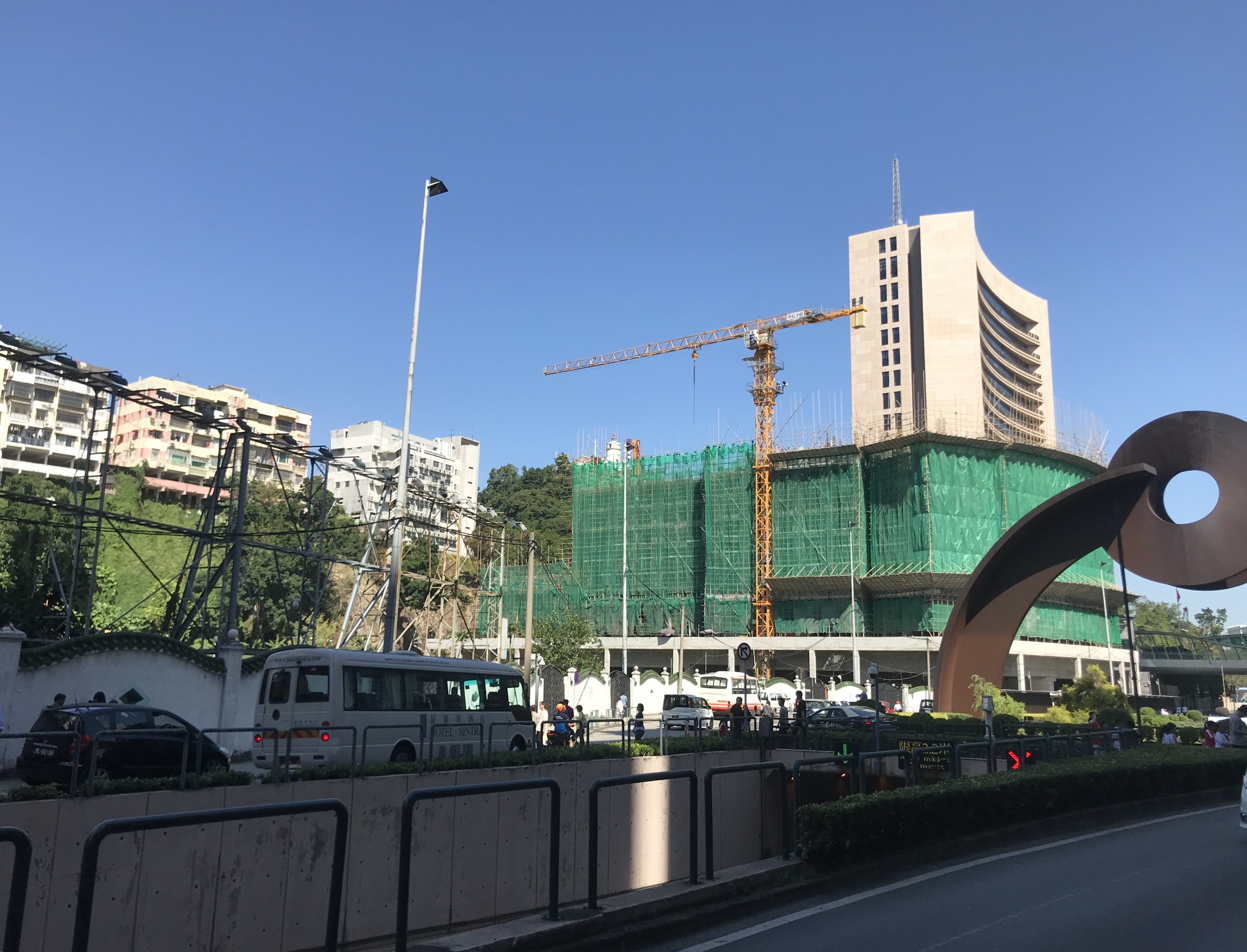
The view in 2018, the then Chief Executive of Macau Edmund Ho signed the Chief Executive's Instruction No. 83/2008 in 2008 (commonly known as the "height restriction instruction") still did not prevent the Guia Fortress's view from being further damaged.

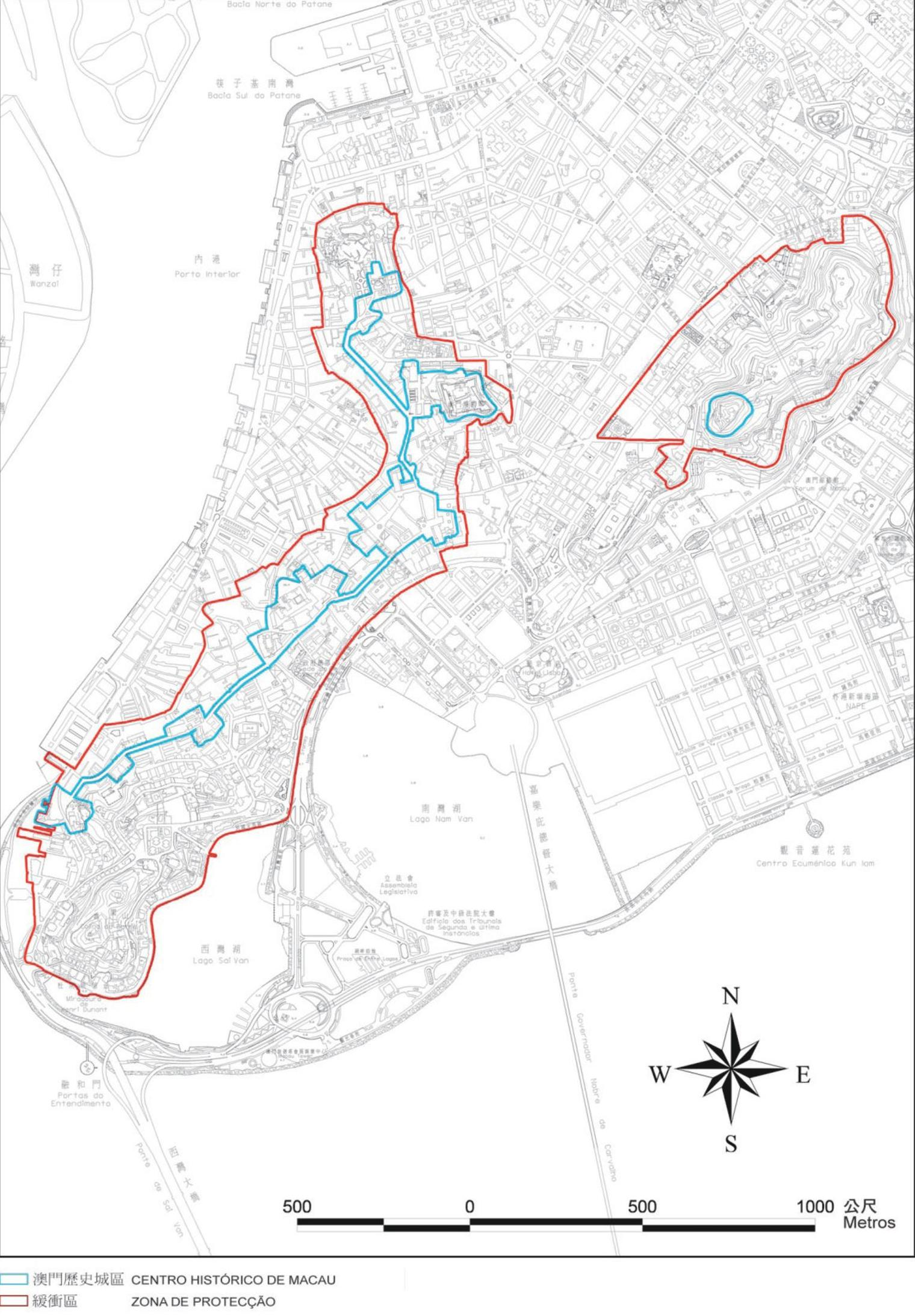
Macau's World Heritage site is surrounded by height restriction protection plans

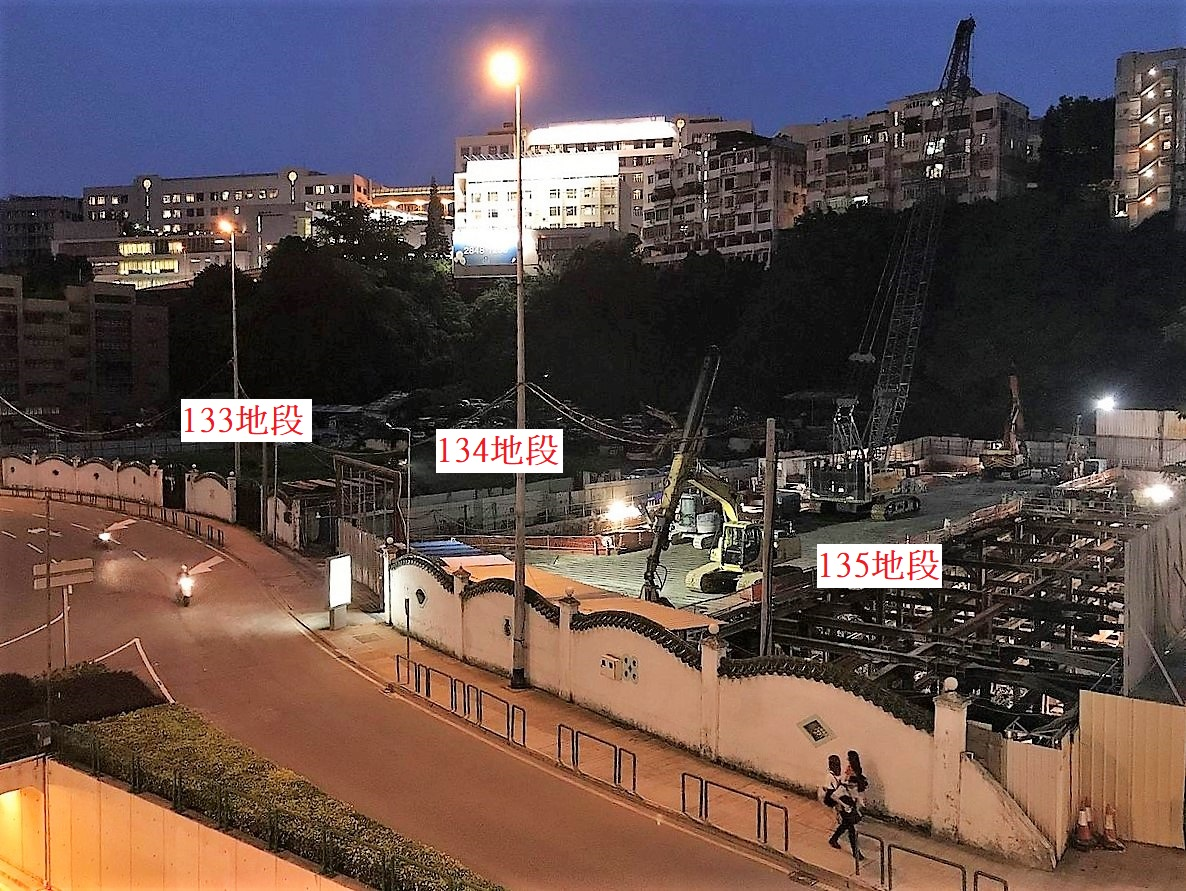
The condition of lots 135, 134 and 133 next to the Liaison Office building in 2016. A 33-story building is being constructed on lot 135, of which 5 floors are basement for residential, commercial and parking purposes, the height of which is said to further damage the view of the lighthouse

==== Lot 136 (completed joint office building) ====
In August 2006, the authorities announced the remediation plan for the area around Avenida do Doutor Rodrigo Rodrigues, the new port of the Macau Peninsula. The proposal showed that the building height restriction was significantly eased for various lots on the hillside of Avenida do Dr. Rodrigo Rodrigues, with the height of Lot 134 being changed to 135 meters above sea level and the building height of various lots next to it being changed to a range of 99.9 meters to 99 meters. The proposal makers agreed that "the height of the building is restricted due to the altitude and the main sightline of the Fortress", but at the same time allowed the "appropriate relief" considering that Lot 134 was not within the main sightline of the lighthouse, with Lot 136 being granted to the Macau Liaison Office in the MSAR for the construction of a 99.9-meter-tall office building. The construction of the Liaison Office building was the first and only one to be completed in a series of newly approved super-tall buildings at the foot of Penha Hill, which was approved by the Chinese government and formally approved by the State Ministry of Finance. When the Liaison Office building was still in the foundation construction stage, there were voices pointing out that even if the concerned heritage conservation groups dared to "tear up" the Liaison Office, it was impossible to stop the project from proceeding.

Macau Legislative Assembly member Au Kam San pointed out that after the repeal of the two orders, the authorities plan to widen the building height around the new border crossing of Avenida do Dr. Rodrigo Rodrigues from 90 meters to even 135 meters. Once this series of high-rise buildings are completed, it will be like a large circular concrete wall enclosing Penha Hill from the direction of the new border crossing, and the beautiful appearance of the small city will be replaced by a "concrete forest" from now on.

In 2007, the Concern Group for the Protection of the Guia Fortress, a local civil society organization, submitted a letter entitled "World Heritage Site: The Historic Centre of Macau is in danger" to the World Heritage Centre, stating:

...... At its 2005 meeting in Durban, the World Heritage Committee resolved to inscribe the Historic Centre of Macao on the World Heritage List after a series of rigorous examinations and recommended that "a management system be fully developed to preserve the existing structural and visual integrity of the heritage area in a modern context and to preserve the main landscape lines of the heritage area. The proposal is "to develop a management system that preserves the existing structural and visual integrity of the area in a modern setting and retains the main landscape lines of the area. ...... Unfortunately, multi-story super tall buildings are being built in the south and south-west slopes of the Guia Fortress, an important scenic area of the "Historic Centre of Macao". The existing structure and visual integrity of the fortress area will not be preserved and the main view line will be damaged. ...... hopes that UNESCO will take the matter seriously and immediately send an expert team to Macau to study the serious threat to the Guia Fortress, meet with representatives of various concerned organizations, advise the Macau government to take effective measures to reduce the height of the above-mentioned super tall buildings that will seriously damage the structure and visual integrity of the Guia Fortress, and propose to expand the protection zone and buffer zone to the south and southwest of the Guia Fortress.

Although the Liaison Office made a concession after the protest and lowered the planned height from 99.9 meters to 88 meters, the view of the fortress was severely damaged anyway (the height limit at the location of the Liaison Office building is 90 meters according to the "height restriction order"), which led the property developers to follow and do the same.

==== Lot 135 (building under construction) ====
In 2015, the Secretary for Transport and Public Works, Mr. Luo Li Man, approved the application for the reuse of the land next to the building of the Liaison Office of the Central People's Government in Macau (Lot 135 of the New Boundary Reclamation Area, currently No. 527-553 of Avenida do Dr. Rodrigo Rodrigues), where a 33-story commercial and residential building will be built. As the land is located in the height restriction area around the fortress, it is likely to block the view of the fortress, which Secretary for Cultural Affairs, Wu Weiming, said that the height of the building has been consulted with the Cultural Affairs Bureau, and the height limit of 90 meters is in line with the World Heritage standard and laws. He also said that the height of the buildings around Penha Hill is very sensitive, but with the progress of society, it is necessary to strike a balance between cultural conservation and development and that the Cultural Affairs Bureau has done its best.

In 2016, Macau Community Police Liaison Officer Chan Tak Seng criticized the decision to approve the construction of another high-rise building: "How can [the official in charge] have so much power? Who is the master behind it, do you need to say? ...... The Liaison Office of the Central People's Government in Macau is responsible for the chaos in Macau and Hong Kong."

==== Lots 133 and 134 ====
In 2006, it was announced that lots 134 and 135 between the Liaison Office building and St. Rose of Lima Girls' High School (English Section) were approved for the construction of over 130 meters tall buildings, just like the Liaison Office building, which would seriously damage the view of the Guia Fortress. After the protest of the civil society, the authorities promulgated "No. 83/2008" to suppress the height limit of the buildings in the area, and the fortress crisis was temporarily increased. Some members of the Town Planning Board pointed out that after the completion of the building, the public will not be able to see the fortress in the district, and criticized the approving authority for still ignoring public opinion and easily disregarding the opinion of the Town Planning Board.

In 2016, the Independent Commission Against Corruption (ICAC) revealed that three of the 16 "released idle lots" (land that has not been developed for a long time) in Macau have expired and must be resumed according to the new Land Law. According to the government communiqué, Lot 134 and Lot 135 were granted in 1982 and 83 respectively, and have passed 25 years since the expiration of the land grant, however, no resumption action has been taken by the authorities.

The Works Bureau later responded that Lot 133 with an area of 3,520 square meters and Lot 134 with an area of 7,802 square meters were granted in the 1940s and 1950s, and were converted into definite grants in 1991 and 1998, but the lots had been left vacant, and the Bureau also relied on aerial photographs and Housing Bureau registration numbers from 1980 to prove that buildings had been constructed in the two lots. The land grantor of Lot 134, Executive Council member Liao Zewan, said that the long-term vacancy is due to the impact of building height restrictions near the Guia Fortress after buying the land in 2004, although the original plan to build 135 meters lowered to 90 meters, has not received government response, so for more than 10 years can not be developed, and they have lost about MOP 1.6 billion.

However, a media report pointed out that according to the Government Gazette, the lot in question was only a villa site at that time, with a developable land area of only 71 m^{2}, and most of the land granted could only be used as a garden (3820 m^{2}). In 1983, the developer requested to convert the site into a commercial and residential building, but due to planning problems, it was not approved by the Portuguese and Australian governments that year. Since then, the government has never announced that the use of the lot could be changed, nor has it stated the amount of land premium to be paid for the redevelopment of high-rise residential buildings. After the media checked the relevant literature, the lot was built with the "Tai Yip Villa" owned by the Ko Ko Ning family. The villa was then 2.5 stories high and was abandoned in the late 1980s, and was once used as a junkyard after demolition in 1995. According to the Land Law, even if the land has been transferred to a definite grant, subsequent redevelopment, raising or change of land use must be gazetted and premiums must be calculated. The two lots were granted street line plans in 2011 and 2013 respectively, allowing the construction of 90-meter-tall commercial and residential buildings.

In June 2020, the "Avenida Dr. Rodrigo Rodrigues 465–513 (134th Street, New Boundary Reclamation)" project was again controversial. The government's response to the question raised by directly elected member Sulu Sou in the Legislative Council was that the Secretary for Transport and Public Works, Raimundo Arrais do Rosário, responded, "I think we all know that this is not a secret, Macau real estate developers are giving the government a lot of pressure ...... they want to play to the end, this is a characteristic of Macau." He also said there is no way that the 135 lots have been built, and for the 134 lots, he said the government will certainly comply with the height restriction around the fortress, but "as everyone knows", the developer will certainly "play to the end".

In response to questions from the public, the Cultural Affairs Bureau stated that "the planning conditions and building height are in line with the requirements of the approval, so there is no foreseeable need to start the heritage impact assessment". The local conservation group, the Guia Fortress Concern Group, issued an urgent appeal to UNESCO on June 10, asking for UNESCO's assistance, and the Concern Group also mentioned that the current regulations are totally inadequate to maintain the visual integrity and main view of the Guia Fortress. A number of architects and stakeholders also expressed their opinion on the Guia Fortress landscape crisis: architect Lui Chak-keung, a member of the International Council on Cultural Monuments and Historic Places, said that the government should have stricter restrictions and that the height of the building has a certain impact on the Fortress landscape, and that an assessment or EIA should be conducted on the impact of the building on the landscape. Maria José de Freitas, an architect who is also a member of the International Committee for Cultural Monuments and Historic Places, also published an article questioning the draft; Mário Duque, an architect, said that considering the function of the lighthouse, the lighthouse must be visible, and the Guia Fortress is a cultural heritage with important meaning and value, and said that although the function of the lighthouse has become secondary in modern navigation if it is heavily surrounded by tall buildings, it will weaken its cultural and historical significance. The architect João Palla said that the landscape of Macau is under threat and that the government should be more sensitive to the different opinion of the public and the different perspectives of the city, and that the view of the Guia Fortress is related to Penha Hill, and should be protected to preserve the story of Macau's mountains. Sandy Lam, a master's student in history and heritage studies at the University of Saint Joseph, thinks that the Cultural Affairs Bureau's explanation is unreasonable, pointing out that the photos show that the new construction from 1996 to the present has had a significant impact on the landscape of Penha Hill.

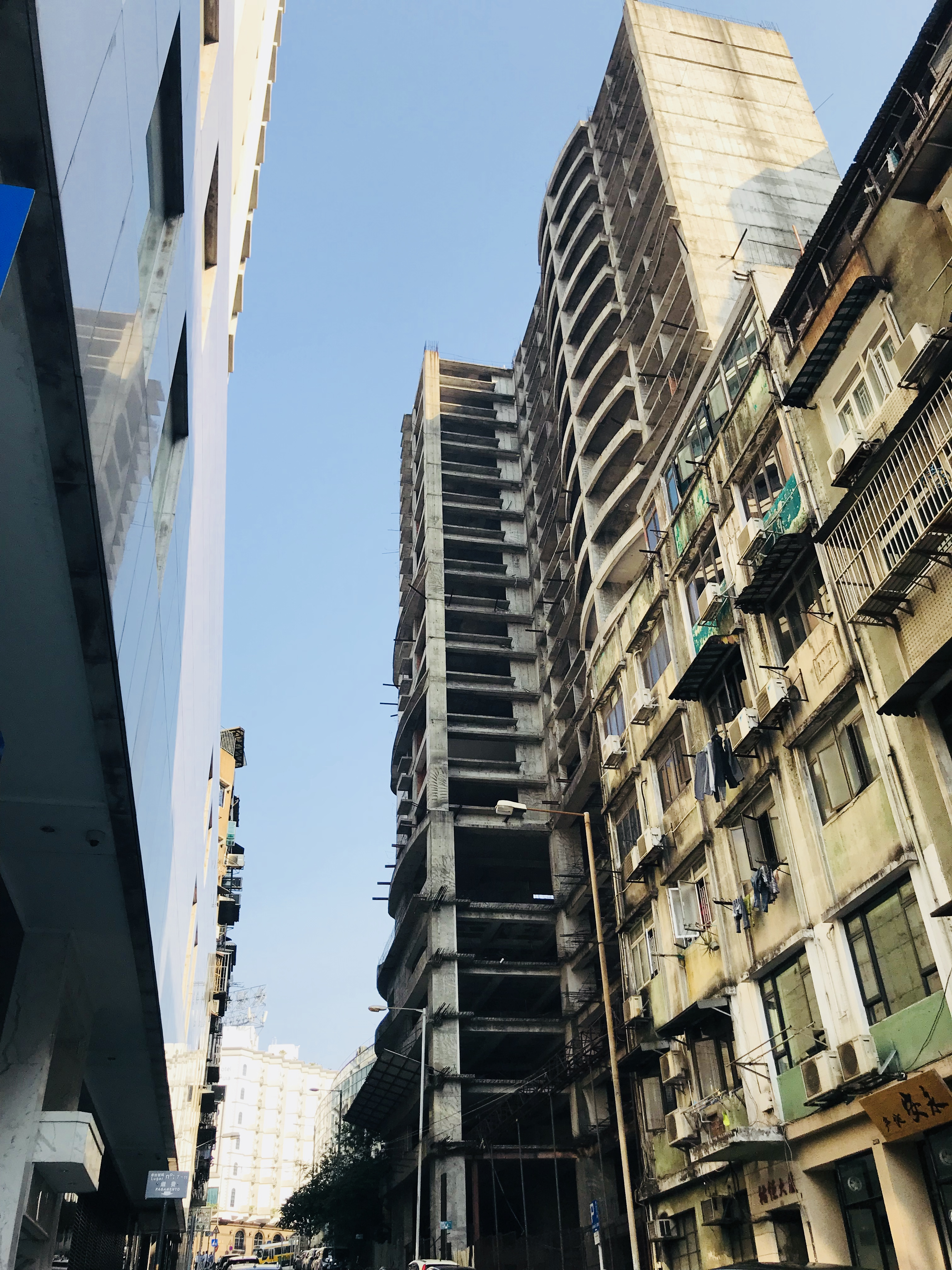
The original plan to build super tall building on Guia Lane has reached 81 meters, exceeding the limit of 52.5 meters as approved by No. 83/2008.

=== Guia slope lane super high rise project ===
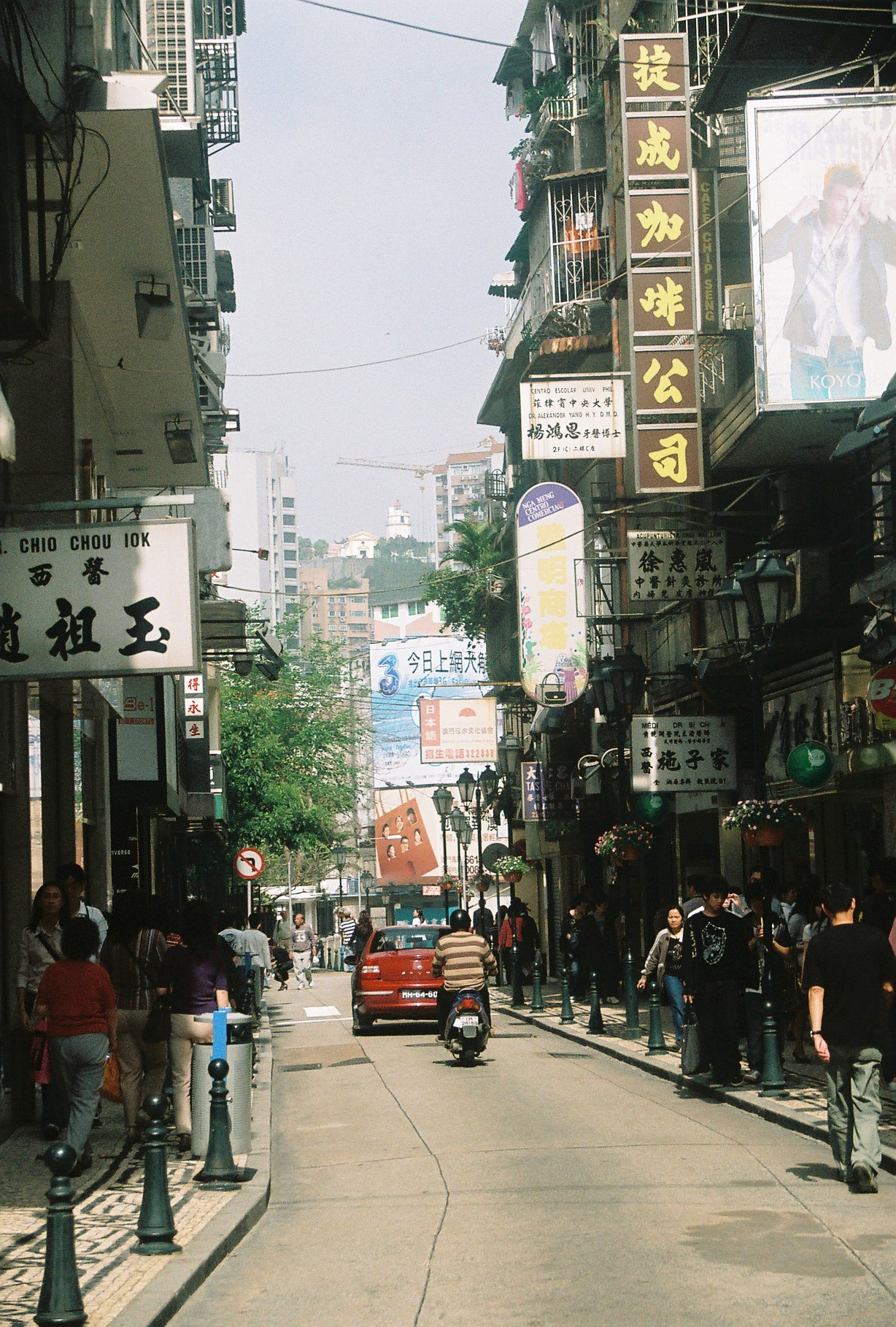
In 2008, the complete Guia Fortress can be clearly seen from Director Burdock Street.

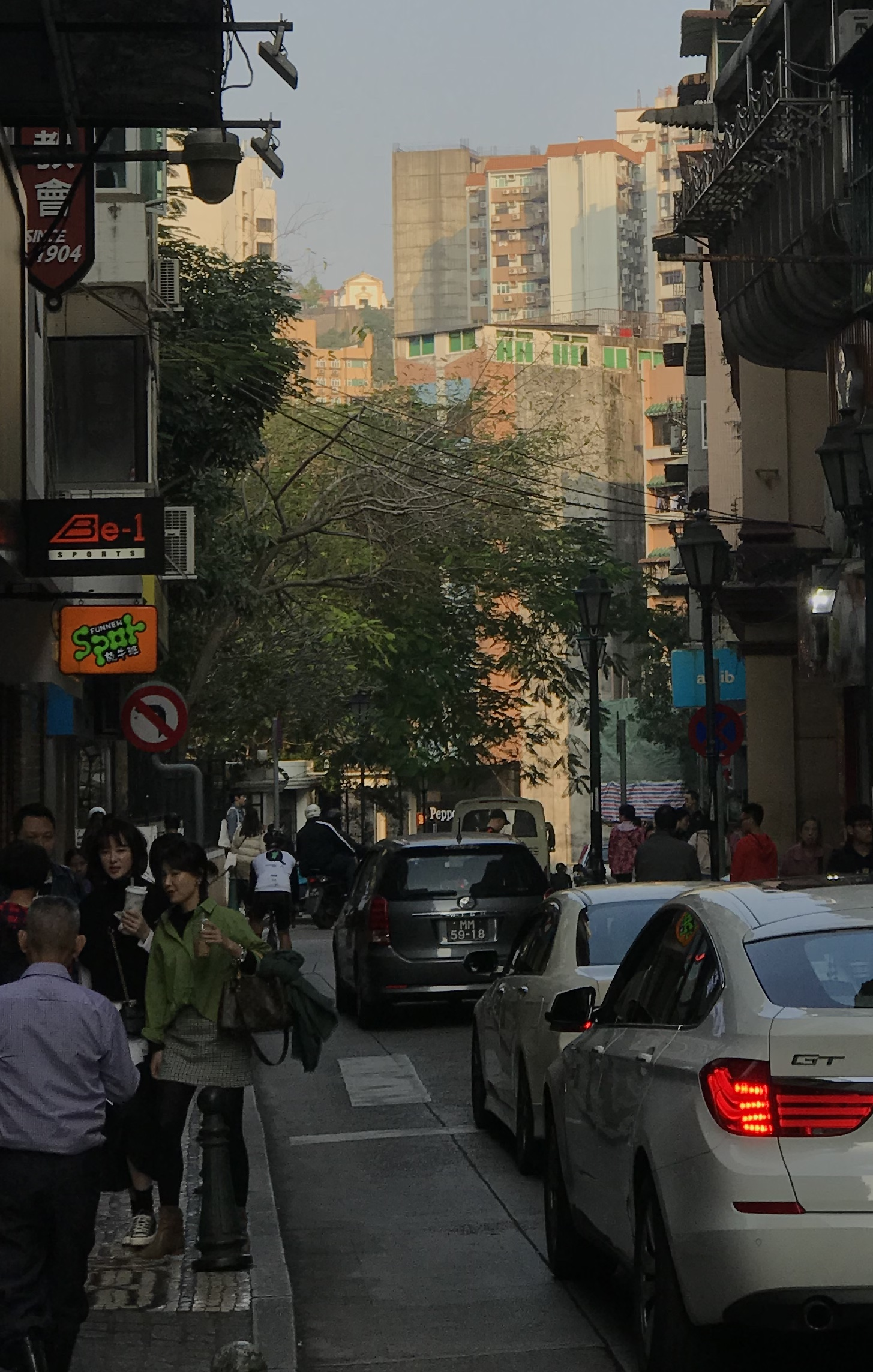
At present, the Guia Fortress, which is blocked by the super tall buildings on Guia Lane, is only visible by the lighthouse Our Lady of the Snows Temple.

Before 2008, the MSAR considered the area around Penha Hill as a "white zone" (land that could be developed at will) and arbitrarily approved the construction of 100-meter tall buildings, far higher than the height of Penha Hill, causing damage to the landscape and undermining the status of the World Heritage Site. In 2007, after complaints from Macau residents, the World Heritage Organization immediately sent its staff to Macau to inspect and verify the complaints, and then pursued the Central Government of China, and subsequently the then Chief Executive of Macau, Edmund Ho, signed Chief Executive's Instruction No. 83/2008 (commonly known as the "Height Restriction Instruction"), which restricted the height of the buildings around the Guia Fortress. The project, which was approved by the former Secretary for Transport and Public Works, Mr. Ao Man Long, who had been imprisoned for bribery, money laundering, and abuse of power since 2012, was then halted.

In August 2016, the Concern Group for the Protection of Guia Fortress, a civil society organization for heritage conservation, issued an early warning: according to the Chief Executive's Order No. 83/2008, the over 100-meter tall building in Guia Lane is located in Height Restriction Zone 6, Sub-area 6–3, with a permitted building height of 52.5 meters. However, after the announcement of approval No. 83/2008, the department concerned still allowed the "problematic super-tall building" on Guia Lane to proceed, resulting in the construction of four more floors to an altitude of 80 meters above sea level, much higher than the height limit of 52.5 meters. The "Concern Group" said that one mistake cannot be repeated and the incumbent Chief Executive has the responsibility to take the lead in complying with the Chief Executive's Instruction No. 83/2008 to reduce the height of the above building to comply with the height limit. The group said: "Any arrangement that allows the height limit to be exceeded will have a serious negative impact on the Guia Fortress, causing the Macau public, the international community, and UNESCO to once again doubt the sincerity of the current Chief Executive in protecting the World Heritage Site, and affecting the rating of Macau as a World Heritage Site."

On October 25, 2016, the government allowed the construction of the super-tall building on Guia Lane, which had been halted for eight years, after a secret "negotiation" with the property developer. The developer has prepared a building plan based on this height, which is being approved by the government. A group plans to write to UNESCO again to complain, and Macau Town Planning Committee member Chan Tak Seng criticized the government for taking the lead in breaking the law and destroying the spirit of the rule of law in Macau. He pointed out that in 2004, the local government of Cologne Cathedral in Germany approved the construction of a number of 140-meter-high buildings on the opposite side of the Rhine River, one kilometer outside the church, which was almost removed from the World Heritage Site. After a warning from UNESCO, all the buildings were demolished within a month, asking, "Do other governments use the thought of 'build it and forget it'?

Macau Councillor Au Kam San raised a written question to refute the claim of the then Secretary of the Cultural Affairs Bureau of Macau, Francis Ng, that "before the approval of the Chief Executive No. 83/2008 came into effect, the government had already approved the building height of 126 meters for the project, and after the construction reached 81 meters, the government requested to stop the construction, and the current height is also an objective fact." The reality is that the developer did not comply with the 52.5-meter height requirement after the Chief Executive's Order 83/2008 came into effect, but instead took advantage of the government's slow response to speed up the construction until it was ordered to stop. That's how the 81-meter height came about. In fact, the height of 81 meters is the product of an illegal act. Can we not strictly comply with the height restriction of CE's Order No. 83/2008 just because it is reasonable and should be recognized? He also pointed out that the height restriction of the buildings around Penha Hill by the Chief Executive's Instruction No. 83/2008 is a legal requirement forced by the government in response to the criticism of the World Heritage Organization, the "concern" of the Central Government and the opposition of the Macau citizens.

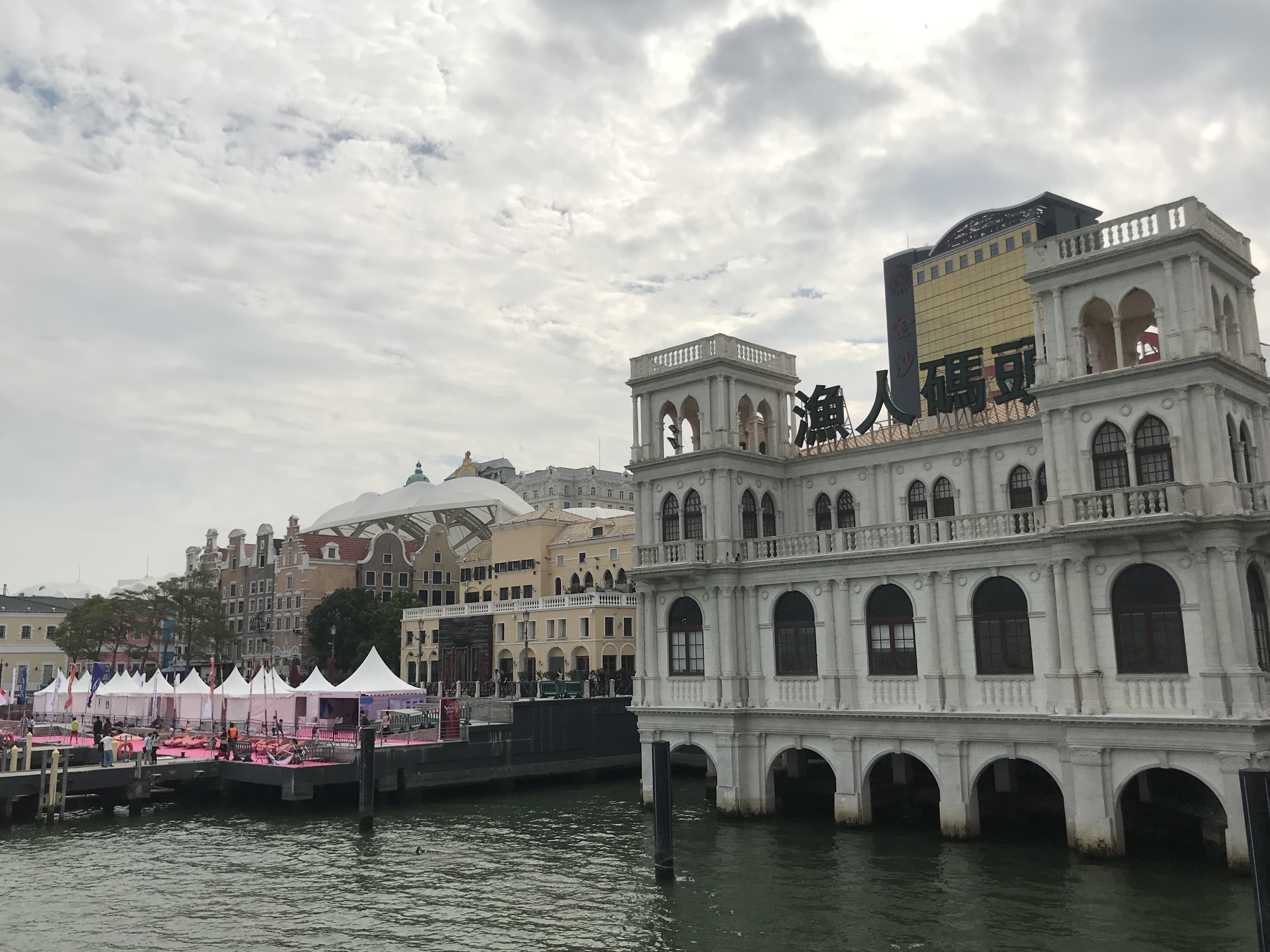
The hotel project at Macau Fisherman's Wharf was named by the UNESCO World Heritage Centre for its high-rise development, which is said to be damaging to the World Heritage Site, including the Guia Lighthouse

On June 13, 2020, the Cultural Affairs Bureau stated in a press release that it had commissioned the Chinese Academy of Cultural Heritage, with the assistance of the National Cultural Heritage Administration, to complete a Heritage Impact Assessment (HIA) in accordance with the World Heritage Centre's guidelines, which concluded that the project should be maintained at its current level and that the HIA report had been submitted to the World Heritage Centre. Lui Chak Keong and João Palla expressed surprise that the Cultural Affairs Bureau had commissioned the Chinese Heritage Institute, as they believed that there were professionals in Macau who could conduct the assessment.

On June 7, 2022, the Cultural Heritage Committee of the Cultural Affairs Bureau held a full meeting to discuss the new design of the long-stalled super-tall buildings at 18–20 Guia Lane as part of its agenda. The owner of the building submitted a revised design proposal to change the façade to a glass design while maintaining the existing height of 81.32 meters. The Secretary for Cultural Affairs, Ms. Leung Wai-man, said that the design is "basically" in line with the UNESCO resolution, and the Bureau will continue to follow up in accordance with the relevant regulations and coordinate with the surrounding environment as much as possible. On the other hand, the Concern Group for the Protection of Guia Fortress did not accept the decision, and spokesman Chan Tak-sing criticized the authorities for "breaking eyes and talking big", and pointed out in 2018, when UNESCO replied to the Concern Group's inquiry, it had already expressed concern about the landscape protection and building height around the Guia Fortress, and requested the government to do a good job in protecting heritage, especially in improving the protection of the 360-degree view of the Guia Fortress. Former Legislative Councillor Sulu Sou also criticized the authorities for the factual inconsistency of the statement, pointing out that the New Macau Association sent someone to UNESCO headquarters in 2016 to reflect on the situation of the super-tall building on Guia Lane. At that time, the World Heritage Centre made it clear that it did not agree to the Guia Lane super-tall building project because it would cause irreversible damage to the view of the fortress.

In April 2023, the construction of the super-tall building resumed, and according to the project permit issued by the authorities, the project is valid from February 9, 2023, to January 10, 2026. The Guia Fortress Concern Group, which has been concerned about the view of the Guia Fortress, wrote to UNESCO again to ask them to stop the project. In the letter, the Concern Group said, "In order to avoid any irreversible damage to the visual integrity of the heritage, we request UNESCO to advise the State Party not to grant any permits for the project until the height and design of the building have been approved by UNESCO's advisory bodies."

=== Fisherman's wharf project ===
The Macau Fisherman's Wharf is located in the area around the Guia Fortress, and in 2014, when the Town Planning Board (TPB) discussed the Fisherman's Wharf Lot A project, more than a dozen public comments questioned why the Works Bureau only approved 60 meters. The then Director of the Department of Town Planning, Mr. Liu Yung, said at the meeting that "the new development is only 48 meters high, 60 meters was the planning proposal of the previous street line plan, and the non-binding opinion of the Cultural Affairs Bureau was also 60 meters." At that time, both the Cultural Affairs Bureau and the Works Bureau's Department of Urban Planning unanimously insisted on the proposed height limit of 60 meters. However, 9 months later, the above-mentioned opinion was nullified and the planning was overturned. The Works Bureau published the street line plan of Fisherman's Wharf Lot A. The buildable height was suddenly increased from the original 60 meters to 90 meters, which was 1/3 higher than the planning proposal discussed by the TPB in August 2014, and the plot ratio was increased from the original 1.7 times to 2.6 times, the coverage rate increased from 42% to 55%, and the estimated buildable floor area increased by nearly half. The Cultural Affairs Bureau did not express any opinion on the second draft plan.

The "three releases" of the Fisherman's Wharf Lot A Planning Conditions Plan by the Works Bureau haVE caused great controversy among the public. However, after being repeatedly questioned by the media, he admitted that he had submitted the proposal of a "90 meters height limit" to the TPB, and said that his opinion was based on Order No. 83/2009, and that "Macau is a society under the rule of law, so we have to respect the requirements of the Order". Asked whether the Cultural Affairs Bureau was under pressure to put the fishing head higher and whether it would run counter to the original idea of "preserving the landscape of the World Heritage Site"? Wu Wei Ming said he was not sure of the details, and said that the views submitted by the Cultural Affairs Bureau to the TPB were not binding and that the final proposal "would be more suitable to be explained by the responsible department (Works Bureau)".

On August 11, 2015, TPB member Wu Iok Pui pointed out that on page 22 of the 2014 Annual Report of the Grantor (LCH Group, the holder of Macau Fisherman's Wharf), it is mentioned that important projects will be developed, including an "LCH Hotel", where it is stated that "the application for increasing the height of the hotel has been submitted to the Macau government for approval": "I would like to raise the consideration of the approval process, is the order of priority reversed? At that time, the elevation of Lot A was 60 meters, the plot ratio was 1.7, and the maximum permitted coverage was 42%. But now the two development intensity indicators have been hastily raised significantly. Or are there things that are not clear to members and the public?"

On August 30, 2015, Mr. David Chow, the CEO of Lai Chun Construction Limited Company, said in an interview with Australia TV that it was legal and reasonable to increase the height of the Fisherman's Wharf project to 90 meters. He said that the application to increase the height from 60 meters to 90 meters was because "a Works Bureau official suggested that this was only a 'procedure' not a 'relaxation'". He also said that the lighthouse is to guide the course of ships at sea, not for people on land to see, saying that people who oppose the height increase "should not distort history".

TPB member Chen Desheng said: "On behalf of the residents in the vicinity, I am firmly opposed to the height of Fisherman's Wharf Lot A to 90 meters." I don't understand, after the first discussion, is it because many people requested 90 meters that the Works Bureau made the decision of 'three releases'? The Works Bureau said many people opposed it, so why can 18 people (only 7 out of 18 submissions were first publicized in 2014 asking for a higher height) decide our fate?" He said that 90 meters are the legal limit, questioning whether all coastal high-rise buildings must be built to 90 meters to meet the requirements of the Chief Executive's instructions and whether it is indirectly "pushing the Chief Executive to the front as an arrow target," adding that " adding that, the Chief Executive made this instruction (Regulation No. 83/2008) in good faith at the time, and UNESCO warned Macau that it was formulated in a very hasty manner, so I won't say whether it was right or wrong. He also said that the Liaison Office was willing to lower the height of the building by 10 meters, so he questioned why the case could not be lowered.

On February 27, 2018, Fisherman's Wharf President May Chan said that she plans to change the height limit of the Fisherman's Wharf Lot A project back to 60 meters to address the community's concerns. Chan expressed her approval of the move, adding that once the government allows Fisherman's Wharf to build a super tall building, it will result in the light from the Guia Lighthouse not shining directly onto the sea, but onto the building, which will "degrade UNESCO's recognition and support."

=== Unesco's response ===
In 2015, the New Macau Association filed a complaint about the protection of the World Heritage site and submitted a report to UNESCO headquarters in Paris, stating that the Liaison Office building obstructed the view of the Guia Fortress, a World Heritage Site. A year after the report was submitted, a UNESCO spokesperson said they were still waiting for a response from the Chinese side. UNESCO's last visit to Macau was in 2007.

In June 2017, the World Heritage Site published a draft resolution after analyzing the report on the state of conservation in Macau, severely pointing out the problems of the Macau government in the protection of the World Heritage Site, strongly concerned about the damage caused by high-rise buildings to the landscape of the Guia Fortress and other World Heritage sites, and naming the hotel construction project at the Macau Fisherman's Wharf. The draft was submitted to the 41st General Assembly of the World Heritage Committee in early July of that year for consideration, and the Macau government was required to send representatives to attend and explain the draft, and the MSAR was required to submit a "management plan" on December 1, 2018, and to submit information on reclamation and town planning at the same time.

In response to UNESCO's criticism, the Cultural Affairs Bureau of Macau went to Beijing in June of the same year to seek assistance from the State Administration of Cultural Heritage (SAC), which, according to its director, Leong Hiu Meng, considered the concern of the UNESCO World Heritage Centre to be a normal procedure, "a good thing" and better than having to remedy the situation afterward. In response to UNESCO's criticism of Macau's "dereliction of duty", the Cultural Affairs Bureau said that the person in charge of the National Cultural Heritage Administration provided the authorities with advice in favor of increasing the height of the Guia superstructure, which was agreed upon by the state department, saying that he was also "a bitter tear". The draft resolution of the World Heritage Centre is relatively strong on the Macau side, such as concerns about the height of buildings around the World Heritage City, urban planning, etc., Francis Leung said that the concerns raised in the draft are the normal procedure of the meeting, but also pointed out that every year there are a large number of similar issues, he also cited the example of the "lighthouse incident" that occurred in Macau, which was more serious and was once placed on the UNESCO watch list, the two are different in nature.

On June 7, Wu Weiming, the former director of the Cultural Affairs Bureau, resigned as a member of the Cultural Heritage Committee for personal reasons. During his tenure, he was criticized for ignoring the controversy over the destruction of the World Heritage Site and allowing the construction of the Guia super-tall building to continue at a height of more than 80 meters. Some media believe that the concern of the World Heritage Site is "a good thing", but in fact, the problem is very serious because it means that the Historic Centre of Macau has been given a "yellow card" by UNESCO. This not only affects the reputation of the MSAR but also the reputation of China. If the site is not rectified by December 1, 2018, in accordance with the requirements of the World Heritage Site, it may be given a "red card" or even removed from the list, which is a very serious lesson.

In July of the same year, the 41st General Assembly of the World Heritage Committee was held and formally passed, without dissent, a resolution warning the Macau government of the ineffective conservation of the World Heritage Site, which called for:

- Macau government to expeditiously complete the delayed "Plan for the Conservation and Management of the Historic Centre"
- "Heritage Impact Assessment" for future construction projects
- Develop a "Reclamation Master Plan" for future land reclamation projects

The above three points must be submitted to the World Heritage Site for prior review to ensure that the Historic Centre of Macau is not damaged by any vicious development. It is also requested that a report on the state of conservation of the Historic Centre of Macau and the progress of implementation of the above-mentioned tasks be submitted to the World Heritage Site by December 2018 for consideration by the 43rd General Assembly in 2019.

In March 2018, the New Macau Institute submitted to the UNESCO World Heritage Site the "Civilian Observatory Report on the Conservation of Macau's World Heritage Sites", which highlighted the repeated threats to the Penha Hill scenery. The Director of the centre, Mechtild Rössler, wrote back to assure that he would closely follow up on the conservation of Macau's World Heritage, including the Macau Master Plan and the report on the work of the conservation plan to be submitted by the end of 2018. In addition, the New Macau Institute pointed out that the Macau government has not taken concrete measures to lift the threat of the high-rise, questioning the authorities for delaying and hoping to start the construction of the high-rise again after the public has forgotten the incident.

== See also ==
- List of World Heritage in Danger
- World Heritage Site
