= Guia Fortress =

Lighthouse in Macau, China

Guia Lighthouse
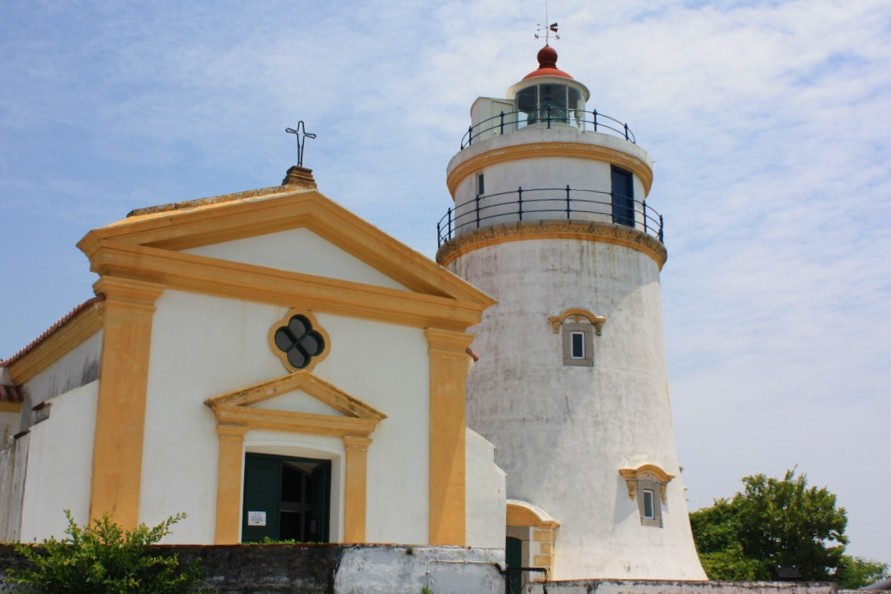
- Capela de Nossa Senhora da Guia and Guia Lighthouse at the Guia Fortress
- Location: Guia Fortress, São Lázaro, Macau, People's Republic of China
- Coordinates: 22°11′47″N 113°32′59″E

Tower
- Constructed: 1865
- Construction: concrete-clad stone tower
- Height: 13.5 metres (44 ft)
- Shape: massive cylindrical tower with double balcony and lantern
- Markings: white tower, gold trim, red lantern roof
- Power source: mains electricity
- Operator: Macau Heritage (Guia Fortress)
- Heritage: Heritage of Portuguese Influence, World Heritage Site

Light
- Deactivated: 1874-1910
- Focal height: 108 m (354 ft)
- Range: 16 nautical miles (30 km; 18 mi)
- Characteristic: Fl(2) W 10s

Guia Fortress

Chinese name
- Traditional Chinese: 東望洋炮台
- Simplified Chinese: 东望洋炮台
Transcriptions
Standard Mandarin
- Hanyu Pinyin: Dōng Wàngyáng Pàotái
Yue: Cantonese
- Jyutping: dung1 mong6 joeng4 paau3 toi4

Portuguese name
- Portuguese: Fortaleza da Guia

The Guia Fortress (Portuguese: Fortaleza da Guia; Chinese: 東望洋炮台) is a 17th-century colonial military fort, chapel, and lighthouse complex in São Lázaro, Macau. The complex is part of the UNESCO World Heritage Site Historic Centre of Macau.

The view of the fortress and the lighthouse has been blocked by the Macau Liaison Office since 2010, which is seen by local citizens and scholars as an example that the conservation of heritage in urban planning was ignored by the Macao government.

== Architecture ==
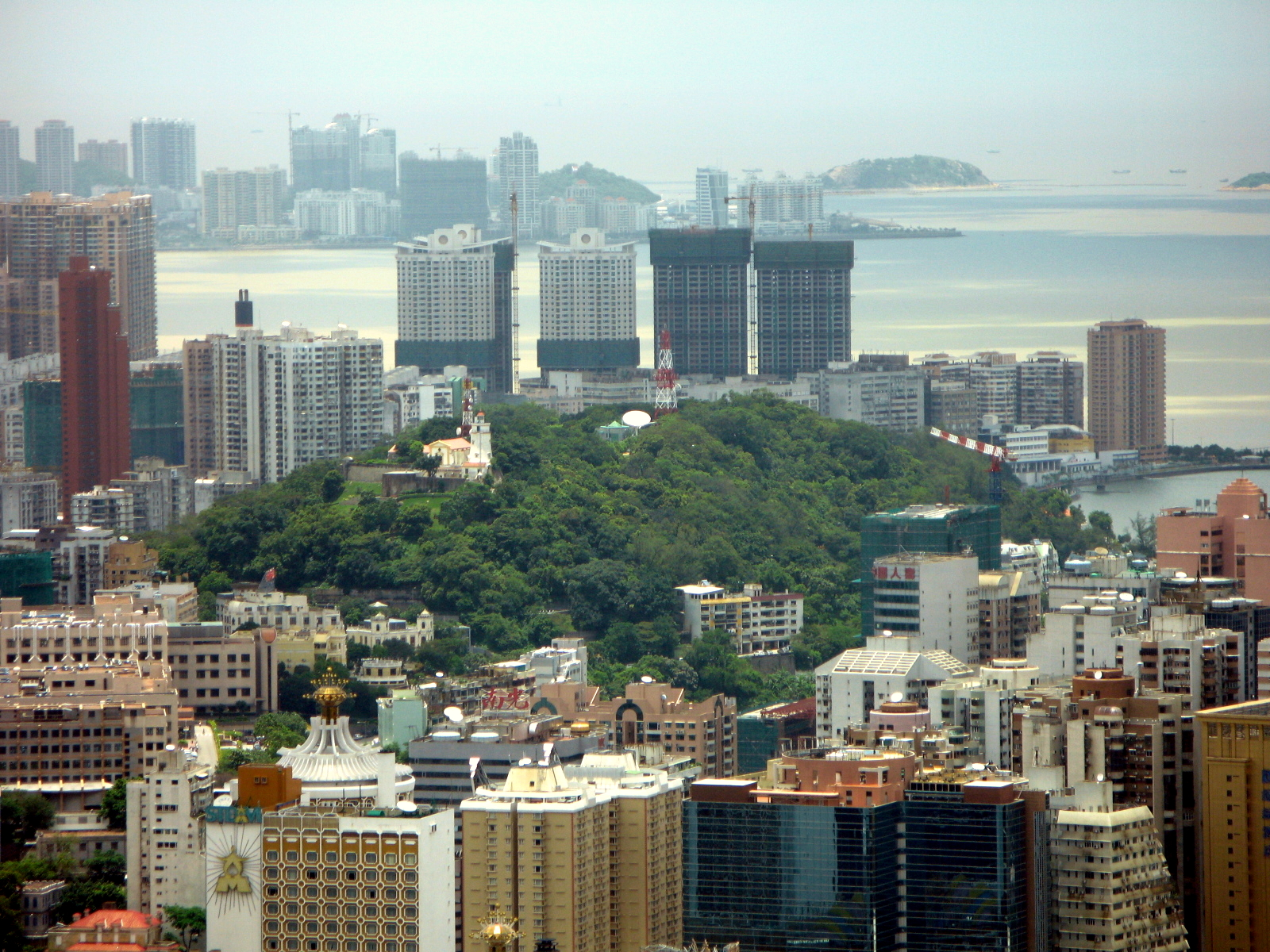
Distant view of Guia Hill and Guia Fortress (center left of the picture).

The fort and chapel were constructed between the 1622 and 1638. The fort was already partly built during the unsuccessful attempt by the Netherlands to capture Macau from Portugal, providing an advantageous firing position for defending against naval attacks.

=== Lighthouse ===
The lighthouse was constructed between 1864 and 1865, the first western style lighthouse in the Far East, southeast Asia or on the China coast. The lighthouse stands at Guia Hill, which stands at 91.4 metres (300 ft) tall, and has a light visible for some 20 miles (32 km) in clear weather conditions. The complex was built upon the highest point on the Macau peninsula, Guia Hill, and named after the same location. Today, the site is a tourist destination.

=== Chapel ===
The chapel (Capela de Nossa Senhora da Guia, 聖母雪地殿教堂) was built around 1622 inside the Guia Fortress.

In 1998, frescoes were uncovered in the chapel during routine conservation work, representing both western and Chinese themes.

== Threat ==
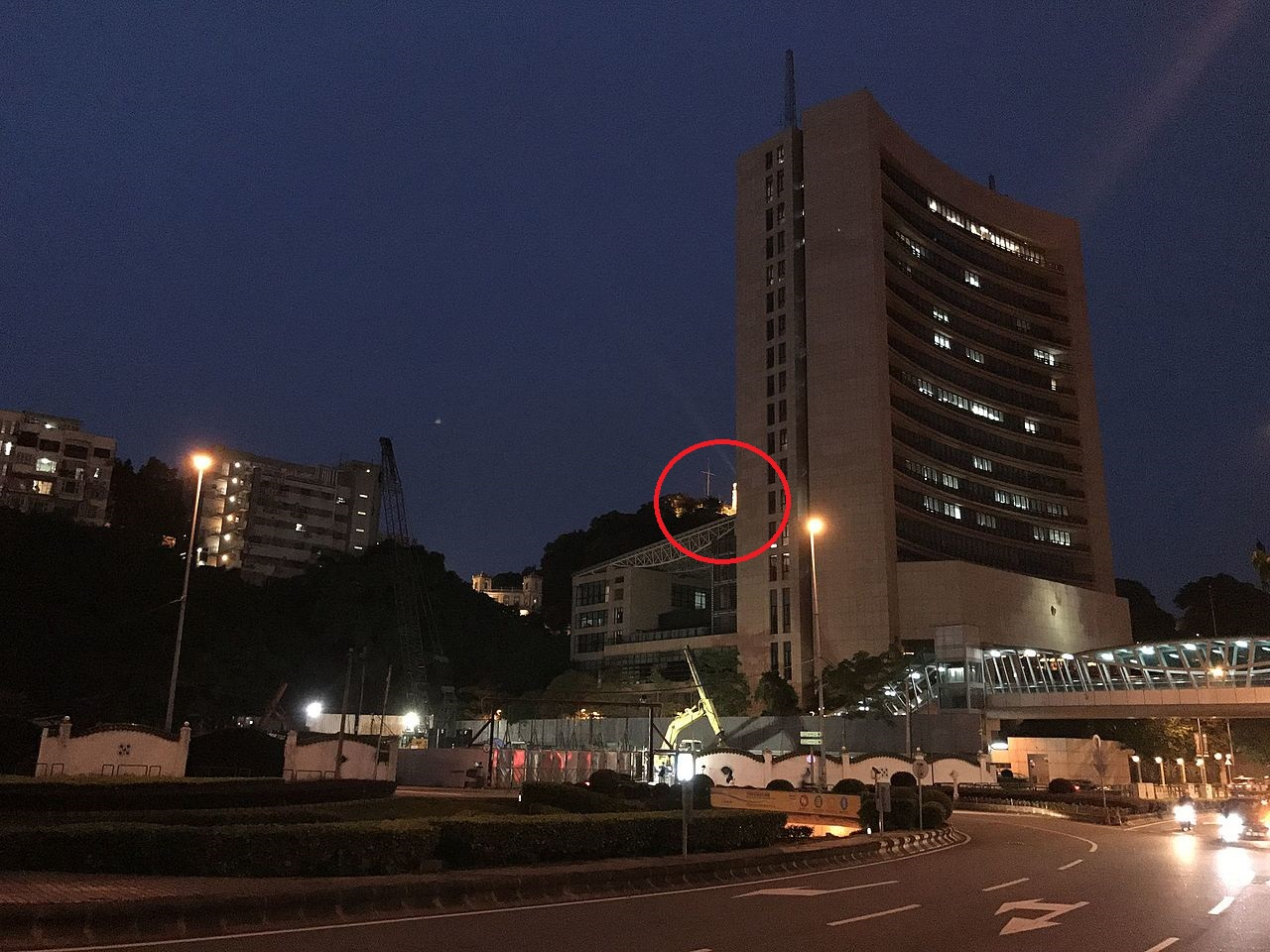
The view of Guia Fortress (center of the picture) is blocked by the building of the Liaison Office of the Central People's Government in the Macao Special Administrative Region.

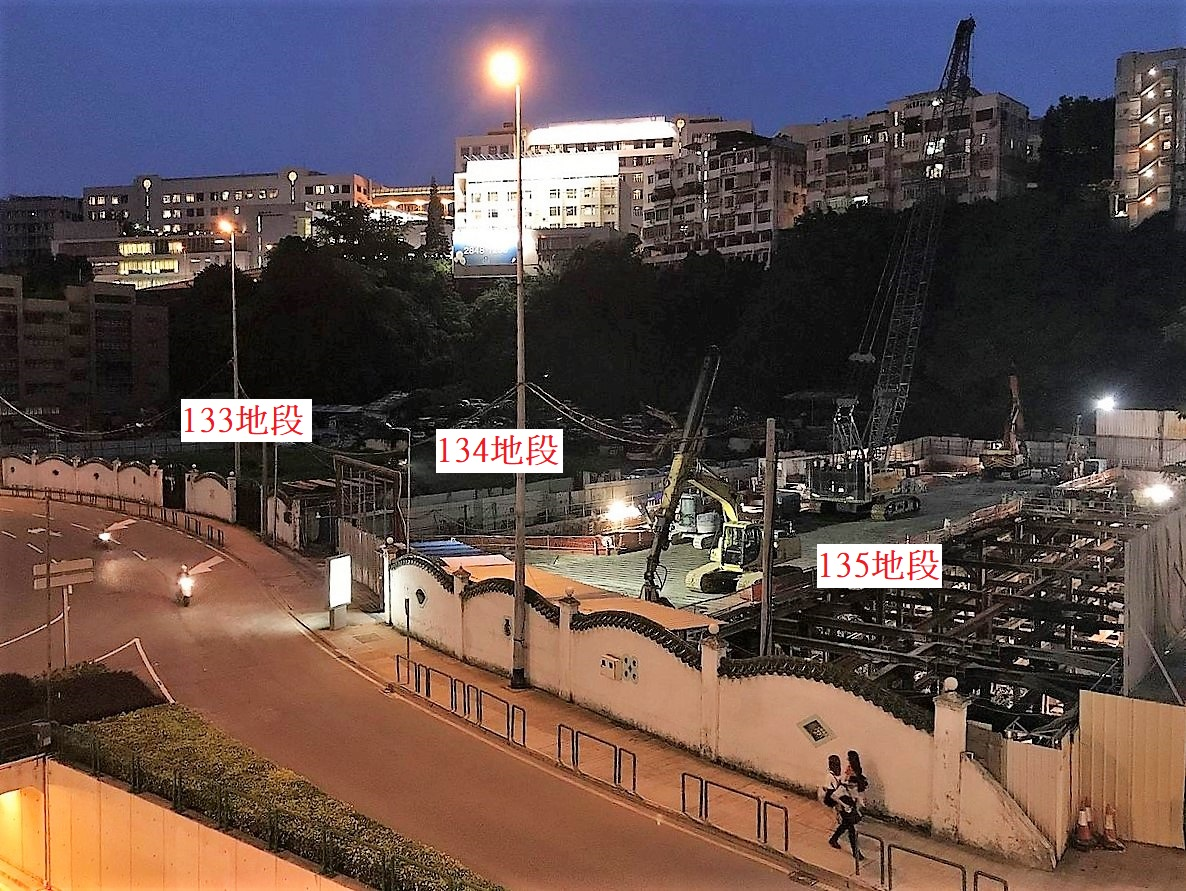
Constructions on the foothill of Guia Hill in 2017.

In 2007, local residents of Macao wrote a letter to UNESCO complaining about construction projects around the World Heritage Site Guia Lighthouse (focal height 108 metres (354 feet)), including the headquarter of the Liaison Office of the Central People's Government in the Macao Special Administrative Region (91 metres (299 feet)). UNESCO then issued a warning to the Macau government, which led former Chief Executive Edmund Ho to sign a notice regulating height restrictions on buildings around the site.

In 2015, the New Macau Association submitted a report to UNESCO claiming that the government had failed to protect Macao's cultural heritage against threats by urban development projects. One of the main examples of the report is that the headquarter of the Liaison Office of the Central People's Government, which is located on the Guia foothill and obstructs the view of the Guia Fortress (one of the world heritages symbols of Macao). One year later, Roni Amelan, a spokesman from UNESCO press service, said that the UNESCO has asked China for information and is still waiting for a reply.

In 2016, the Macau government approved an 81-metre (266-foot) construction limit for the residential project, which reportedly goes against the city's regulations on the height of buildings around world heritage site Guia Lighthouse.

Stanford University professor Ming K. Chan (陳明銶) and University of Macau professor Eilo Yu (Chinese: 余永逸) commented the Guia Lighthouse case proved that the Macao government had ignored the conservation of heritage in urban planning.

== See also ==
- Fortaleza do Monte, another Portuguese fort in Macau
- List of lighthouses in Macau
- List of oldest buildings and structures in Macau
- Landscape crisis of the Guia Fortress
