= Avenida do Doutor Rodrigo Rodrigues =

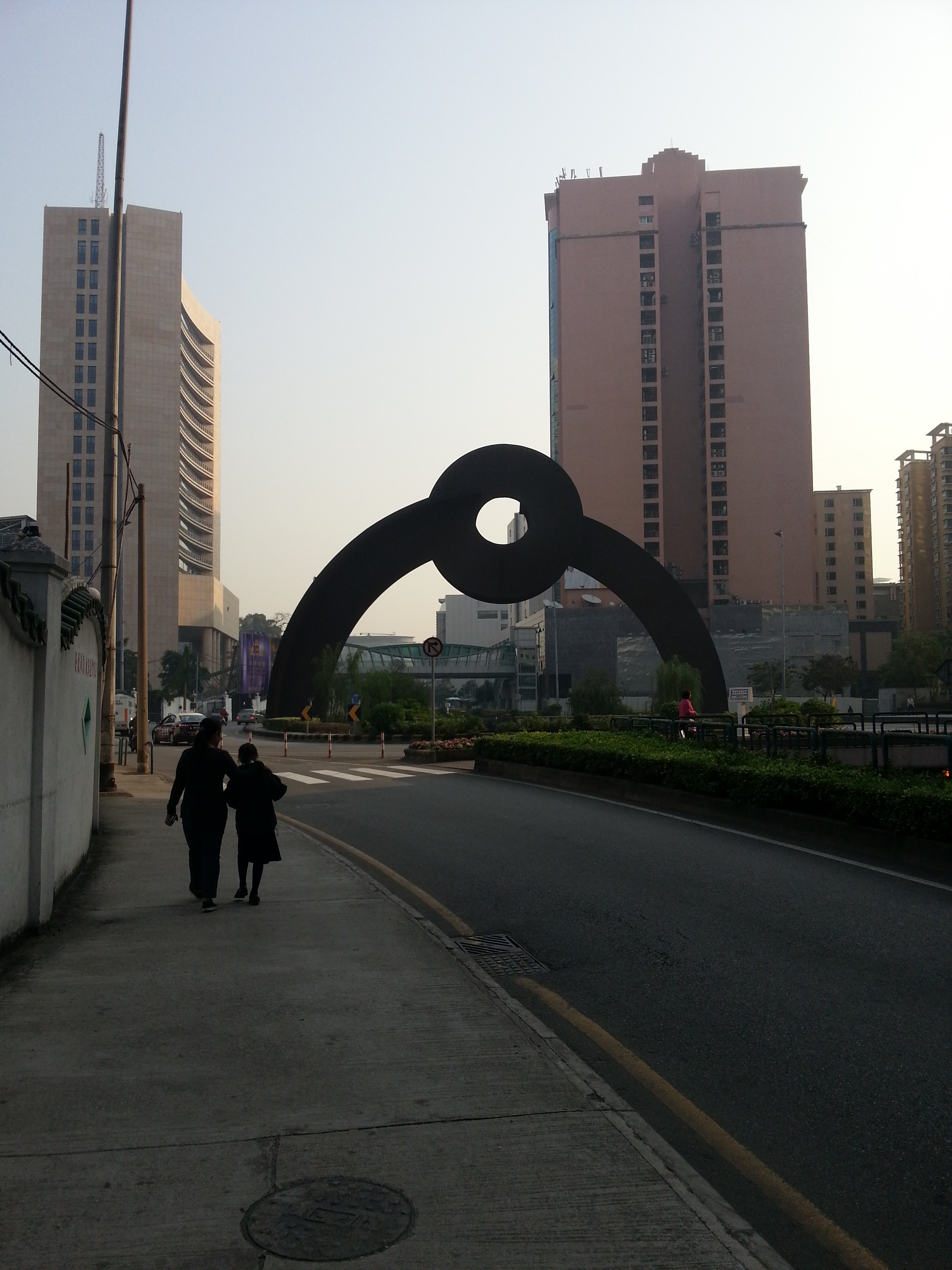
- The monument at the roundabout in the middle section of Avenida do Dr. Rodrigues Rodrigues.
- Native name: 羅理基博士大馬路 (Chinese)
- Length: 1,280 m (4,200 ft)
- Location: Macau, China
- From: Praça Ferreira Amaral
- To: Outer Harbour Ferry Terminal

Avenida do Doutor Rodrigo Rodrigues
- Traditional Chinese: 羅理基博士大馬路
Transcriptions
Standard Mandarin
- Hanyu Pinyin: Luó lǐ jī bó shì dà mǎ lù
Yue: Cantonese
- Jyutping: lo4 lei5 gei1 bok3 si6 daai6 maa5 lou6

Avenida do Doutor Rodrigo Rodrigues (Chinese: 羅理基博士大馬路) is a multi-lane street at the South of the Macau peninsula starting close behind Grand Lisboa and Club Militaire and ending close to the Outer Harbour Ferry Terminal station.

== Naming ==
The street Avenida do Doutor Rodrigo Rodrigues was named after Rodrigo José Rodrigues who was governor of Macau from 1923 to 1925.

== Major buildings ==
Amongst others, the Casa Real Hotel and Casino and the Hotel Beverly Plaza are located at the Avenida do Doutor Rodrigo Rodrigues.

== See also ==
- List of roads in Macau

== Gallery ==
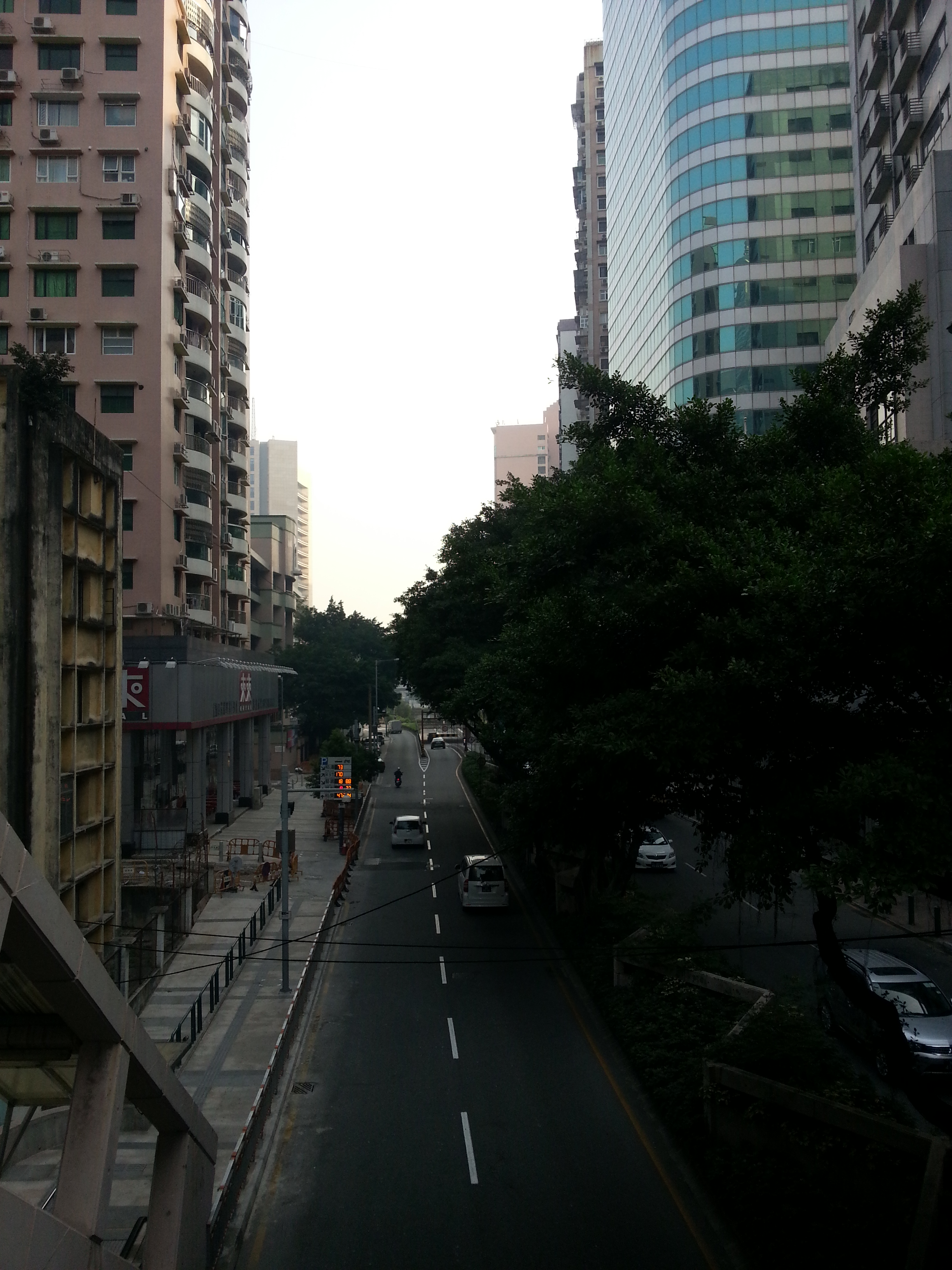
Western view on the avenue.

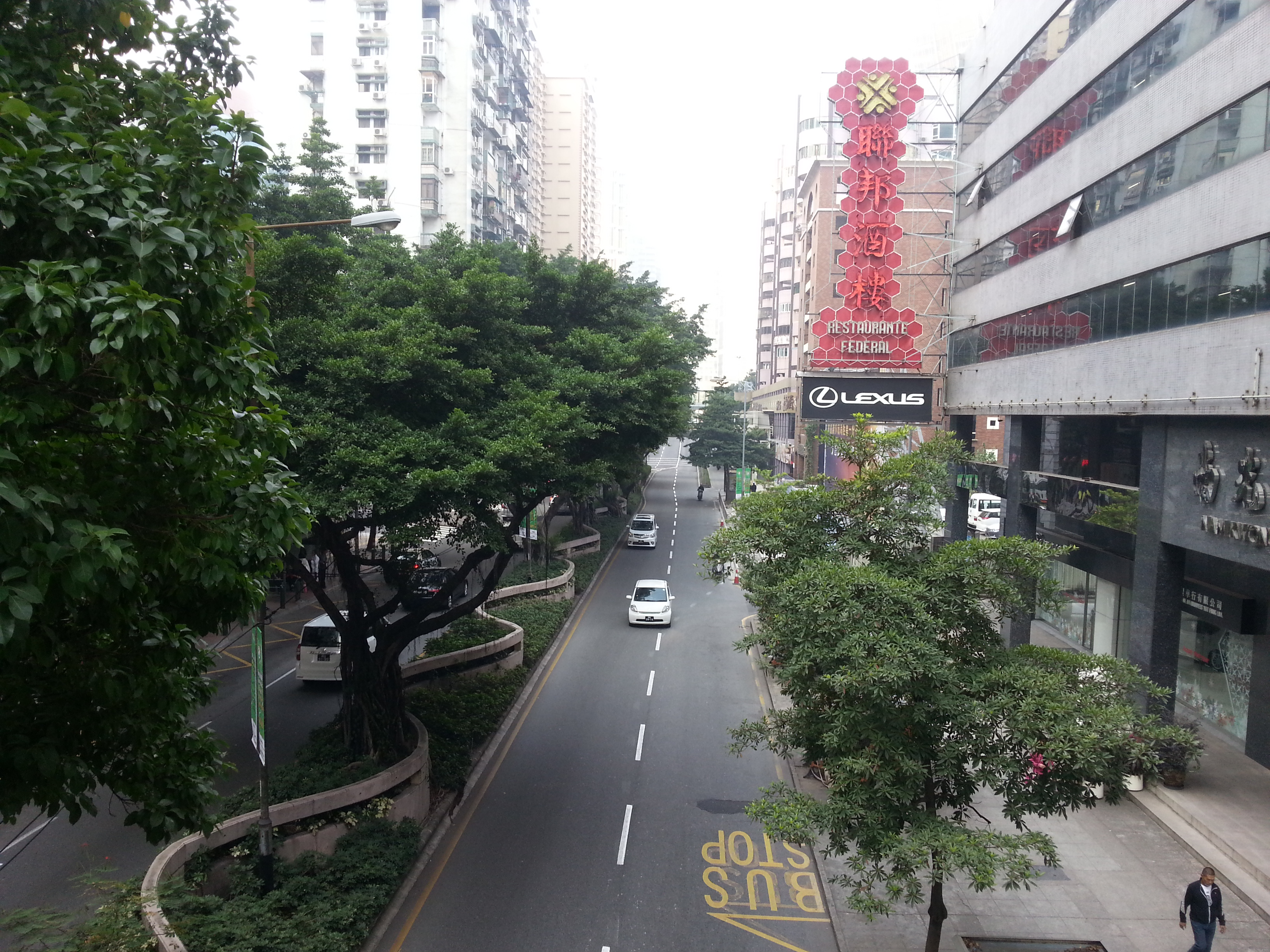
Photo taken from walkover looking towards eastern end of the avenue.
