= List of hypermarkets =

Hypermarket availability around the world Hypermarkets available Hypermarkets planned Hypermarkets were available previously No information/no hypermarkets

This is a list of hypermarket chains sorted alphabetically by continent and country. A hypermarket is a superstore carrying a wide range of products under one roof, and may aim to allow customers to satisfy all their shopping needs in one trip.

== Africa ==
=== Algeria ===
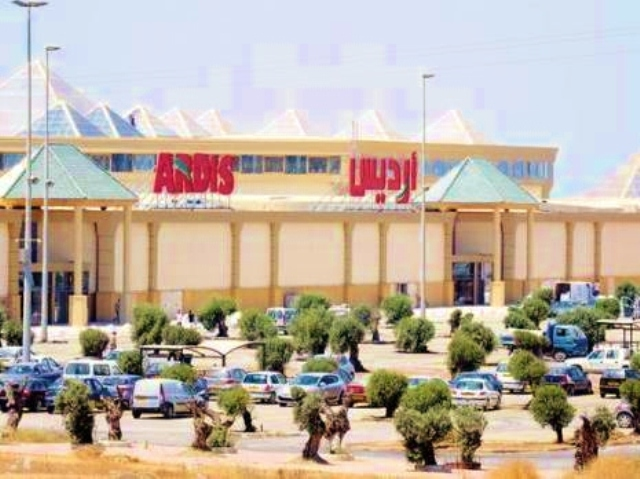
Ardis hypermarket in Mohammadia, Algiers, Algeria

The Algerian chain Ardis (owned by Algerian group Arcofina) is currently operating one hypermarket in the city of Mohammadia, just outside Algiers. In the future Ardis will open 19 hypermarkets in the country; the next will open near Oran in Bir El Djir. Carrefour ended their partnership with the Algerian group Arcofina on February 19, 2009. "The concept of mass distribution does not work in Algeria," added Carrefour. Before that, Carrefour had still only one store opened as of 2009 of 18 hypermarkets planned by 2012. The private group Arcofina explained that there was a delay because of difficulties in finding available land for hypermarkets. Arcofina is now focusing on opening hypermarkets in the future under the Ardis brand.

- Ardis
- Carrefour (defunct, but returned in 2015)
- Cevital

=== Benin ===
- Erevan (Système U)

=== Egypt ===
- Carrefour
- Spinneys
- LuLu Hypermarket

=== Gabon ===
- Géant – Mbolo

=== Ivory Coast ===
- Carrefour

=== Kenya ===
- Carrefour
- Game
- Naivas
- Nakumatt
- Tuskys
- Uchumi

=== Mauritius ===
- Hyper U
- Shoprite

=== Mayotte ===
- Cora
- Super U

=== Morocco ===
There are several hypermarkets operating in the country. The biggest are Marjane, Aswak Assalam and Carrefour. The Acima brand, which belongs to the same retail group with Marjane, are stores that cannot qualify as hypermarkets because they are smaller.

- Aswak Assalam
- Carrefour
- Marjane

=== Réunion ===
- Carrefour
- Cora
- Géant Casino
- Hyper U

=== Rwanda ===
- Nakumatt
- Simba Supermarket
- T2000

=== South Africa ===
- Checkers Hyper
- Choppies
- Game
- Makro
- Pick n Pay Hypermarket
- ShopriteHyper
- SUPERSPAR
- USave Superstore

=== Tunisia ===
- Auchan – scheduled to open in 2012
- Carrefour
- Géant

=== Zimbabwe ===
- Spar Megastore

== Asia ==
=== Armenia ===
- Carrefour

=== Bangladesh ===
- Aeon
- Keells
- Lotte Mart
- Lulu Hypermarket
- Spinneys

=== Bahrain ===
- Al Muntazah
- Carrefour
- Géant
- Lulu Hypermarket

=== Brunei ===
- Giant Hypermarket

=== Cambodia ===
- Aeon

=== China ===
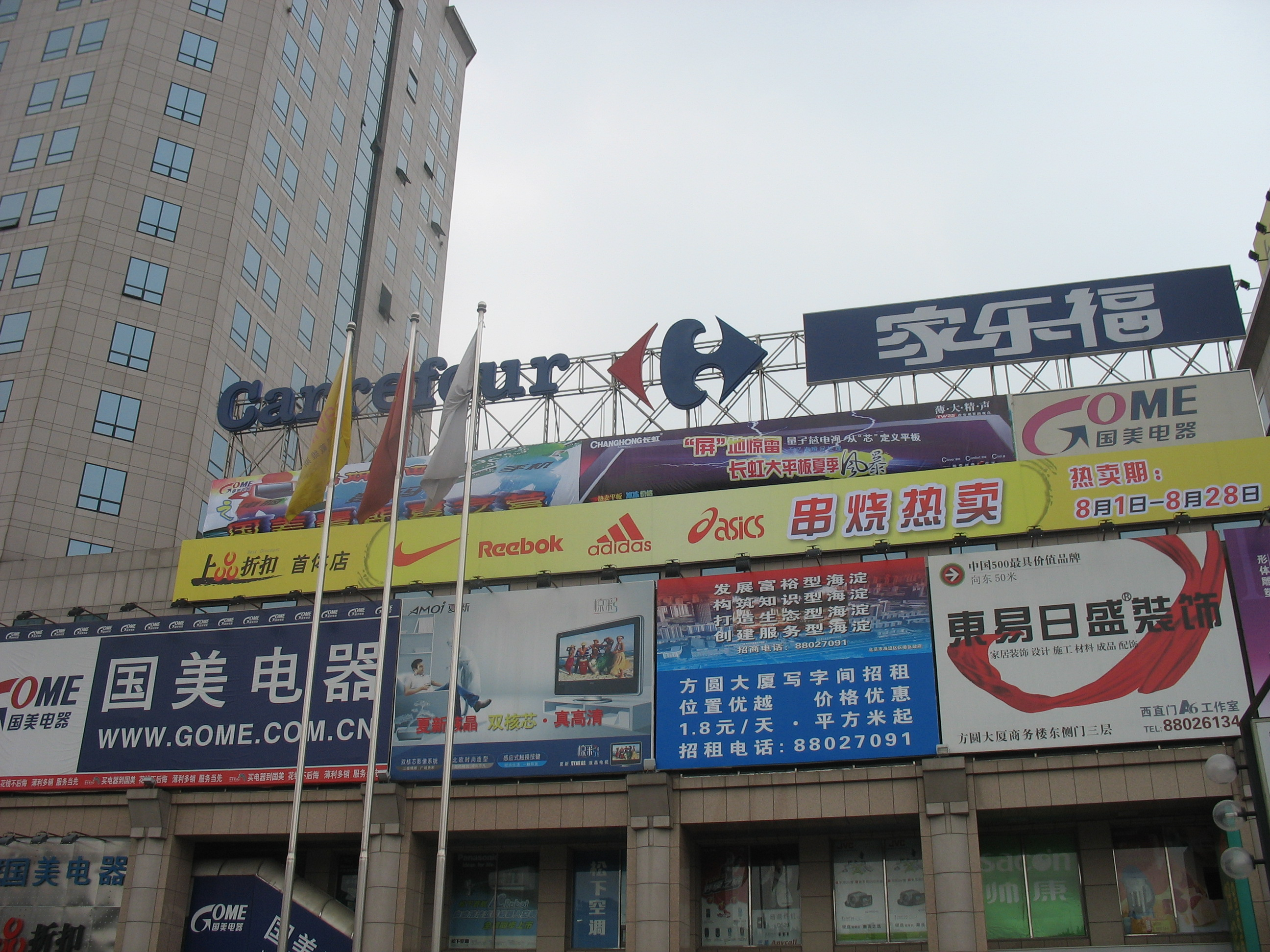
Carrefour in Beijing, China

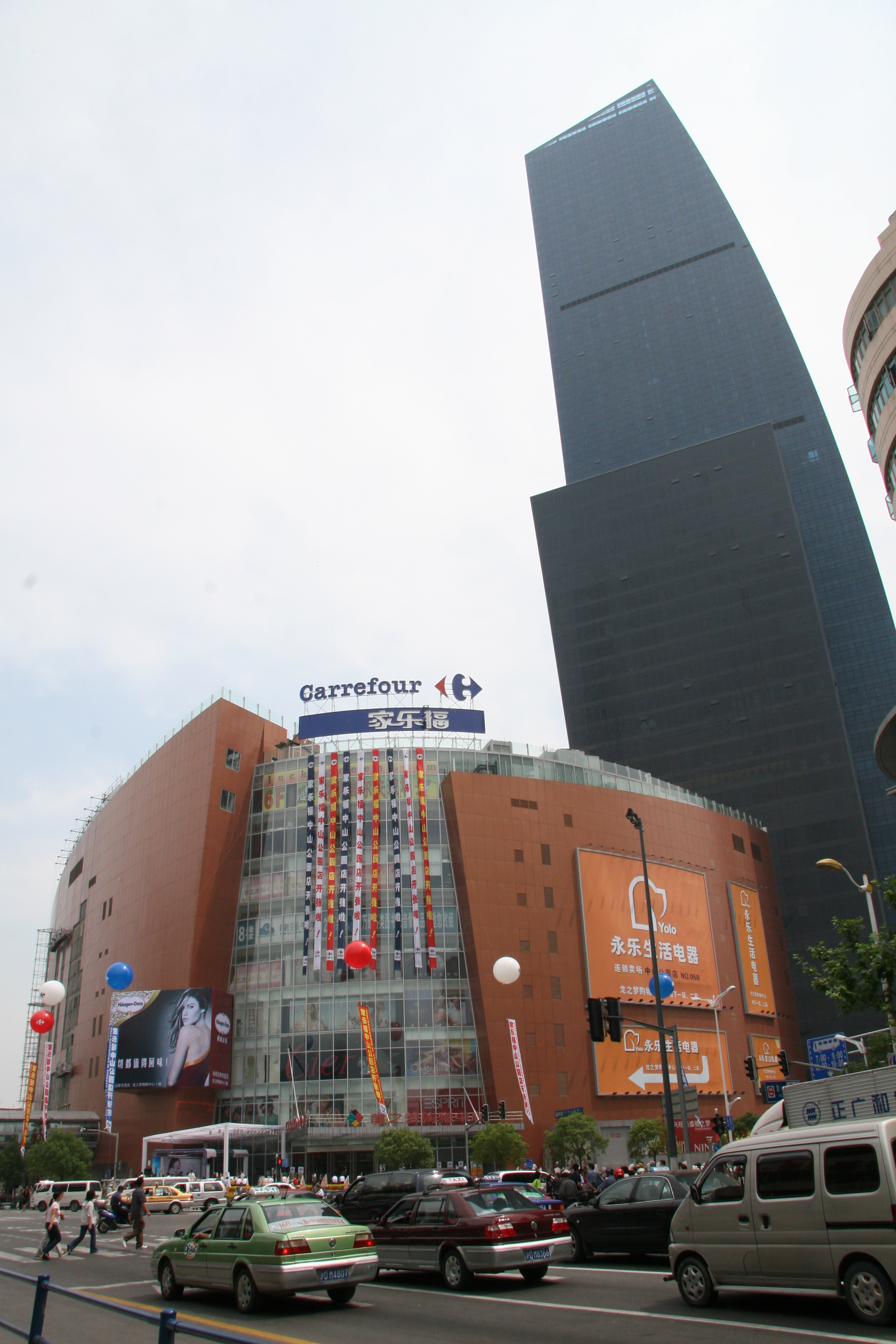
Carrefour in Shanghai, China

- Auchan
- Carrefour
- Hualian
- JUSCO
- Walmart
- Wumart

Defunct

- Tesco

=== Georgia ===
- Carrefour
- Spar Hypermarket

=== Hong Kong ===
There were some hypermarkets owned by Carrefour, which were closed down by 2000.

As of July 2011, there were five Æon JUSCO hypermarkets, 19 Wellcome superstores, and 43 PARKnSHOP superstores there.

- Aeon
- JUSCO
- PARKnSHOP
- Wellcome superstores

Defunct chains

- Carrefour

=== French Polynesia ===
- Carrefour
- Géant

=== India ===
- D-Mart
- Lulu Hypermarket
- Reliance Fresh
- Nesto
- Smart Bazaar
- More
- Spar Hypermarket
- Spencer's Hyper
- Trent

Defunct

- Carrefour
- Auchan

=== Indonesia ===
- Aeon
- Hero
- Lotte Mart
- LuLu Hypermarket
- Hypermart
- Super Indo
- Ranch Market
- Transmart
- The Foodhall
- Grand Lucky
- Indogrosir

Defunct

- Carrefour (taken over by Transmart)
- Makro (taken over by Lotte Mart)
- Metro
- Giant
- SPAR
- Sogo Supermarket (taken over by The Foodhall)
- Walmart

=== Iran ===
- Iran Hyper Star
- Padideh
- Proma Hypermarket
- Refah

=== Iraq ===
- Carrefour

=== Israel ===
The hypermarket format in Israel was not a success because retail chains abandoned hypermarkets and later converted them into smaller discount stores. Carrefour opened in the country in 2023, currently having more than 100 branches, with plans to open more.

- Carrefour
- Hyper Dudu

=== Japan ===
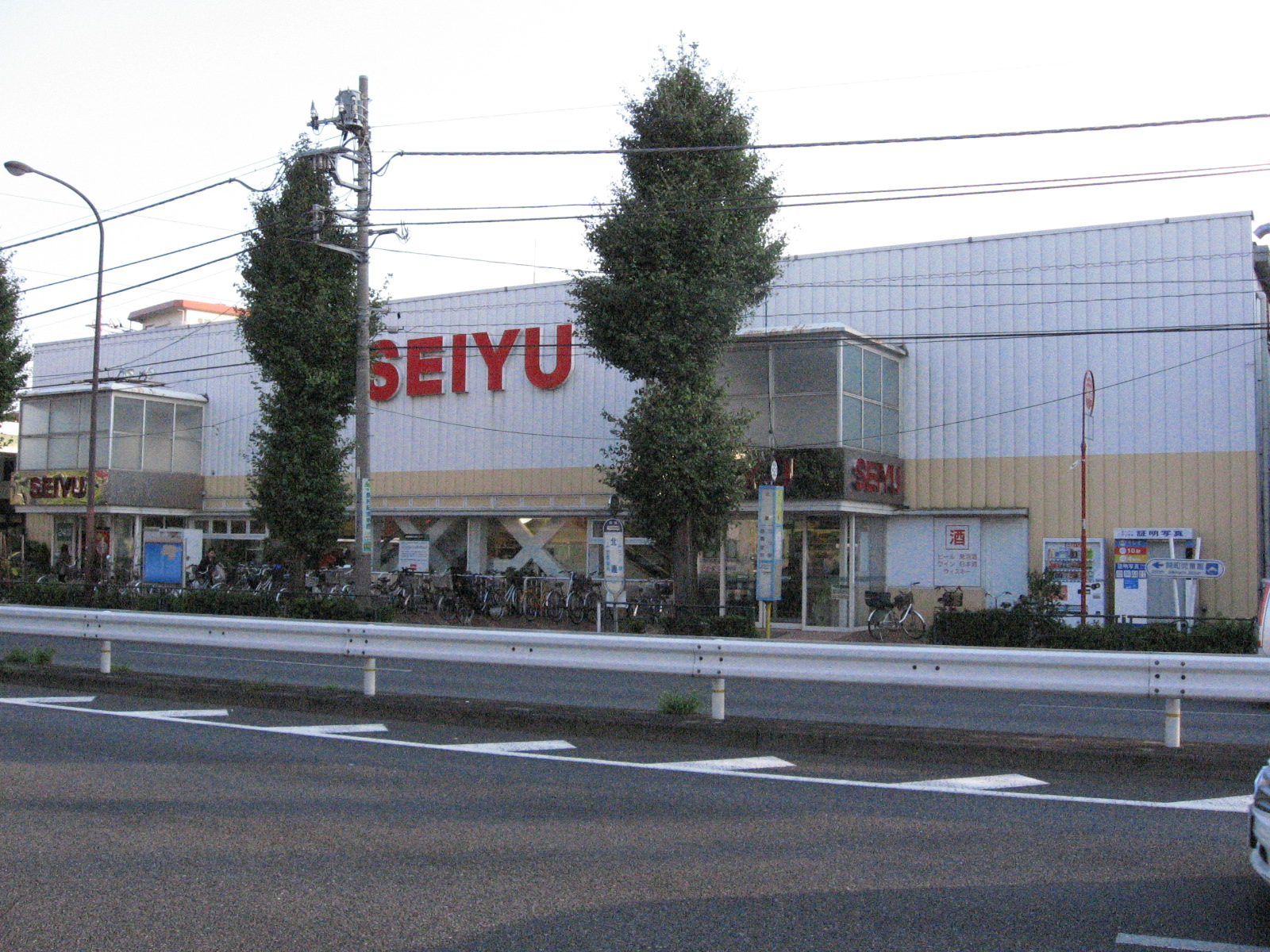
Seiyu hypermarket owned by Walmart in Nerima, Tokyo in Japan

- Aeon
- Daiei
- Ito-Yokado
- SEIYU (Walmart)
- UNY

Defunct

- Carrefour
- Tesco

=== Jordan ===
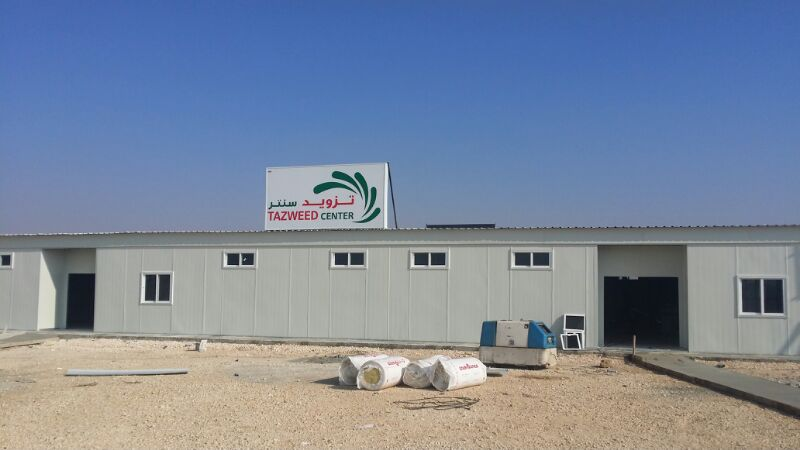
Tazweed Center, Zaatari refugee camp, Mafraq

In Jordan, Carrefour has one branch in Amman (a joint venture between Majid Al Futtaim Group and Carrefour France) and has an area of 11,000 square meters. Hypermarkets also exist in the Zaatari refugee camp in Mafraq as part of the WFP initiative, which led the project to establish the stores.

- C-Town
- Carrefour
- Cozmo
- Spinneys
- Tazweed Center

=== Kazakhstan ===
- Kazmart DIY
- MEGA Astana
- Ramstore Hyper

=== Kuwait ===
The hypermarkets operating in Kuwait are Grand Hyper division Regency Group Dubai, which operates six hypermarkets in Kuwait, in Fahaheel, Watiya, Hawally, Jleeb al Shuwaikh, Khaithan and Hassawi, and two Grand Fresh mini supermarkets in Mangaf and Abuhalifa. Géant operates one hypermarket at 360 Mall, and six other supermarkets across the country, such as Carrefour and City Centre. The Sultan Center has 11 locations in Kuwait that target expatriate shoppers. CityCentre has two hypermarkets in Kuwait, in Shuwaikh and Salmiya. Carrefour has one hypermarket at The Avenues, in Shuwaikh, a few minutes out of downtown Kuwait City.

Lulu Hypermarket is the biggest hypermarket chain in GCC, and operates six outlets in Kuwait in Al Rai, Al Qurain, Al Dajeej, Salmiya, Egaila and Fahaheel.

=== Laos ===
- Big C

=== Lebanon ===
- Carrefour
- Spinneys

Defunct brands

- Géant

=== Macau ===
- PARKnSHOP

=== Malaysia ===
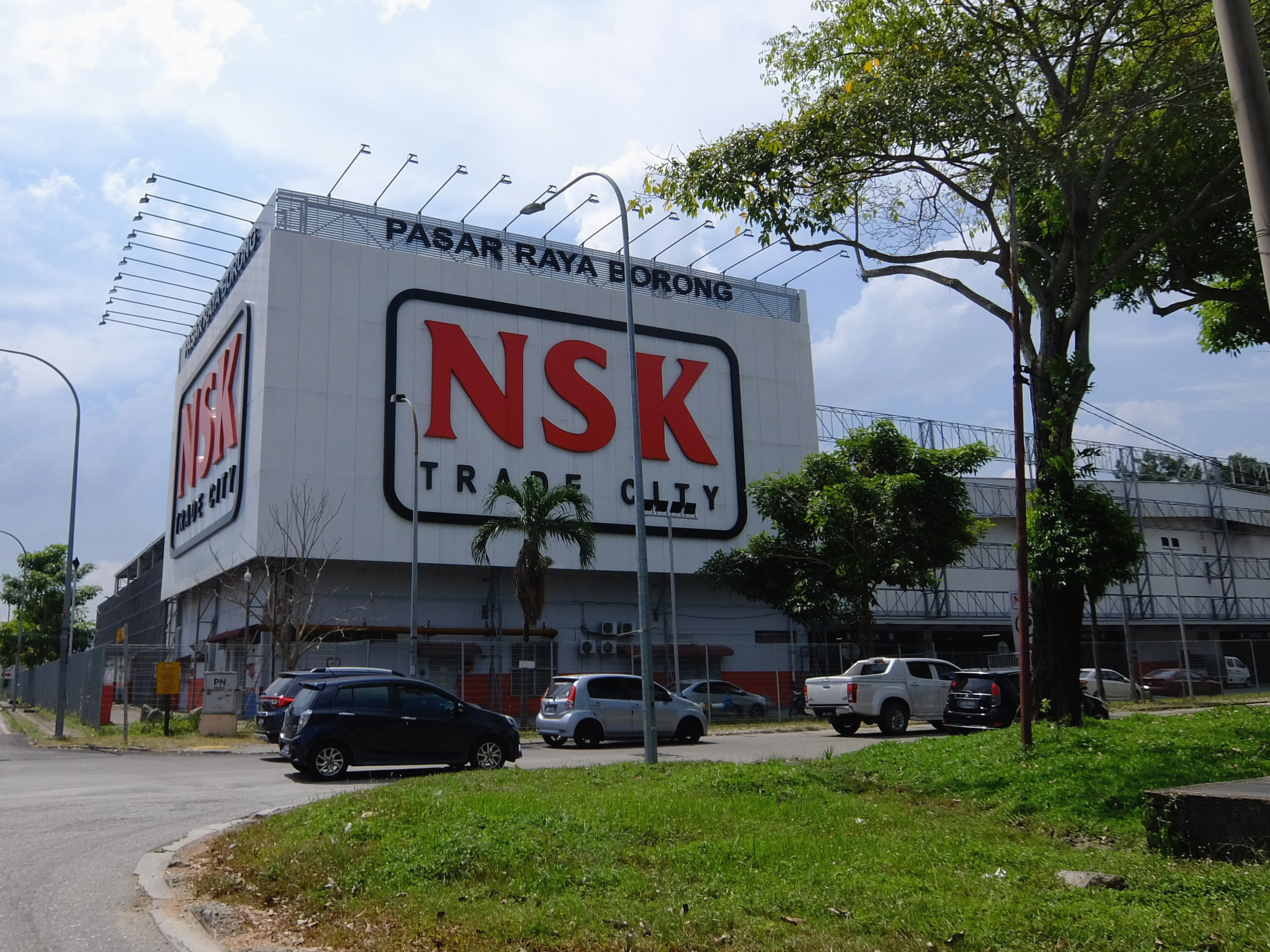
NSK Trade City in Pandan, Johor Bahru.

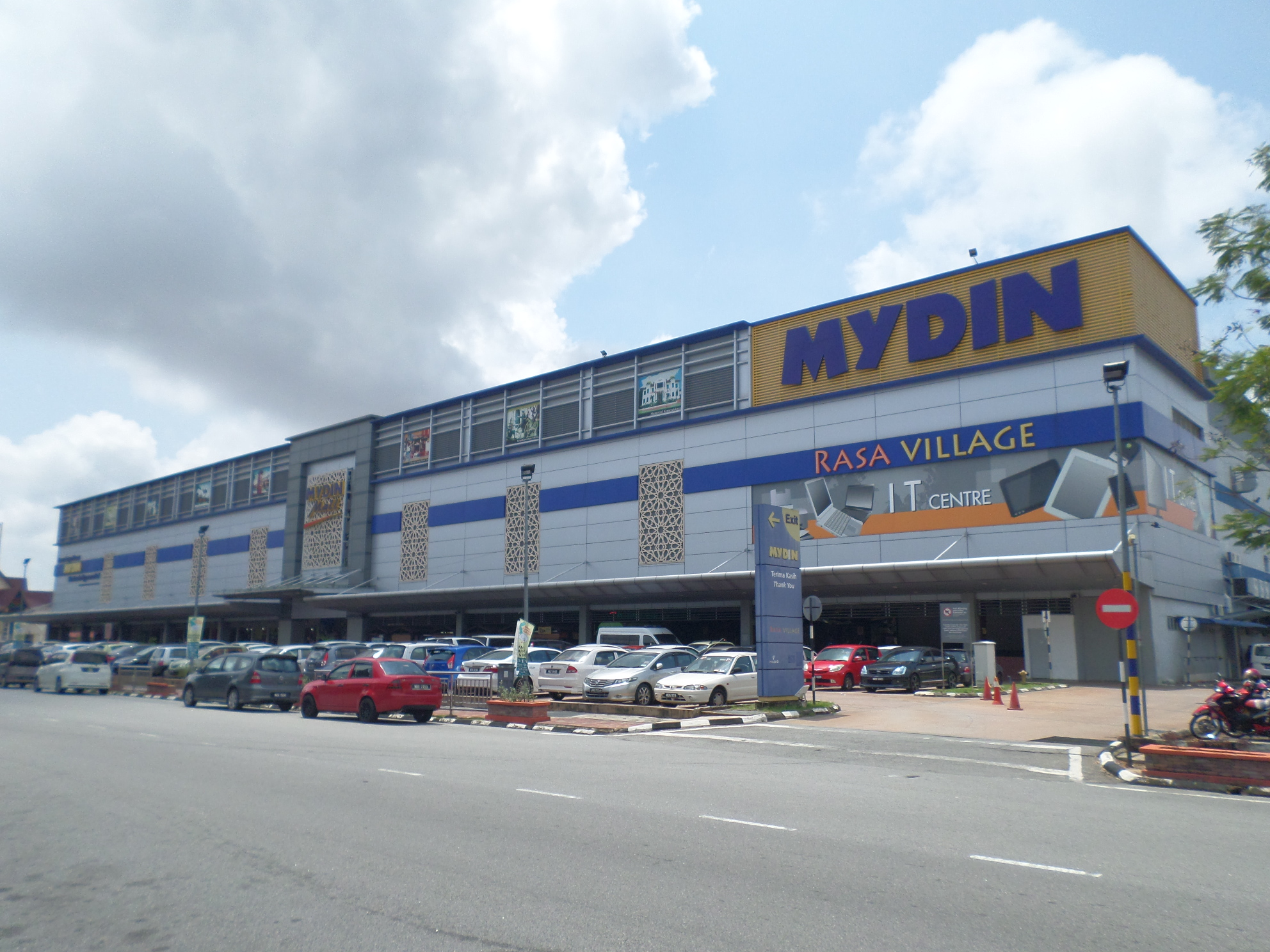
Mydin Wholesale Hypermarket in Malacca, Malaysia

- Aeon
- Jaya Grocer
- Giant Hypermarket
- Lulu Hypermarket
- Mydin Wholesale Hypermarket
- NSK Trade City
- Servay Hypermarket (East Malaysia only)
- Lotus's (formerly known as Tesco)
- Econsave

Defunct:

- Carrefour – taken over by AEON BiG in 2012
- Makro – taken over by Tesco in 2007
- Tesco – taken over by Lotus's in 2021
- Kedai Runcit Usaha Kami - closed in 2019

=== Oman ===
- HyperMax
- Lulu Hypermarket
- Nesto Group

Defunct:

- Carrefour – rebranded as HyperMax in 2025

=== Pakistan ===
- Hyperstar (Carrefour)
- Metro
- Imtiaz supermarket

=== Palestine ===
- Shini Extra (Al Shini Group)
- Mercado Hypermarket

=== Philippines ===
- Puregold
- SM Hypermarket
- Super Metro

=== Qatar ===
- Carrefour
- Géant Casino
- Lulu Hypermarket

=== Saudi Arabia ===
- Al Danube
- Carrefour
- HyperPanda
- Lulu Hypermarket
- Tamimi Group
- Nesto Group

=== Singapore ===
- Cold Storage
- FairPrice Xtra
- Giant Hypermarket
- Sheng Siong

Defunct

- Carrefour (withdrew from the region in late 2012)

=== South Korea ===
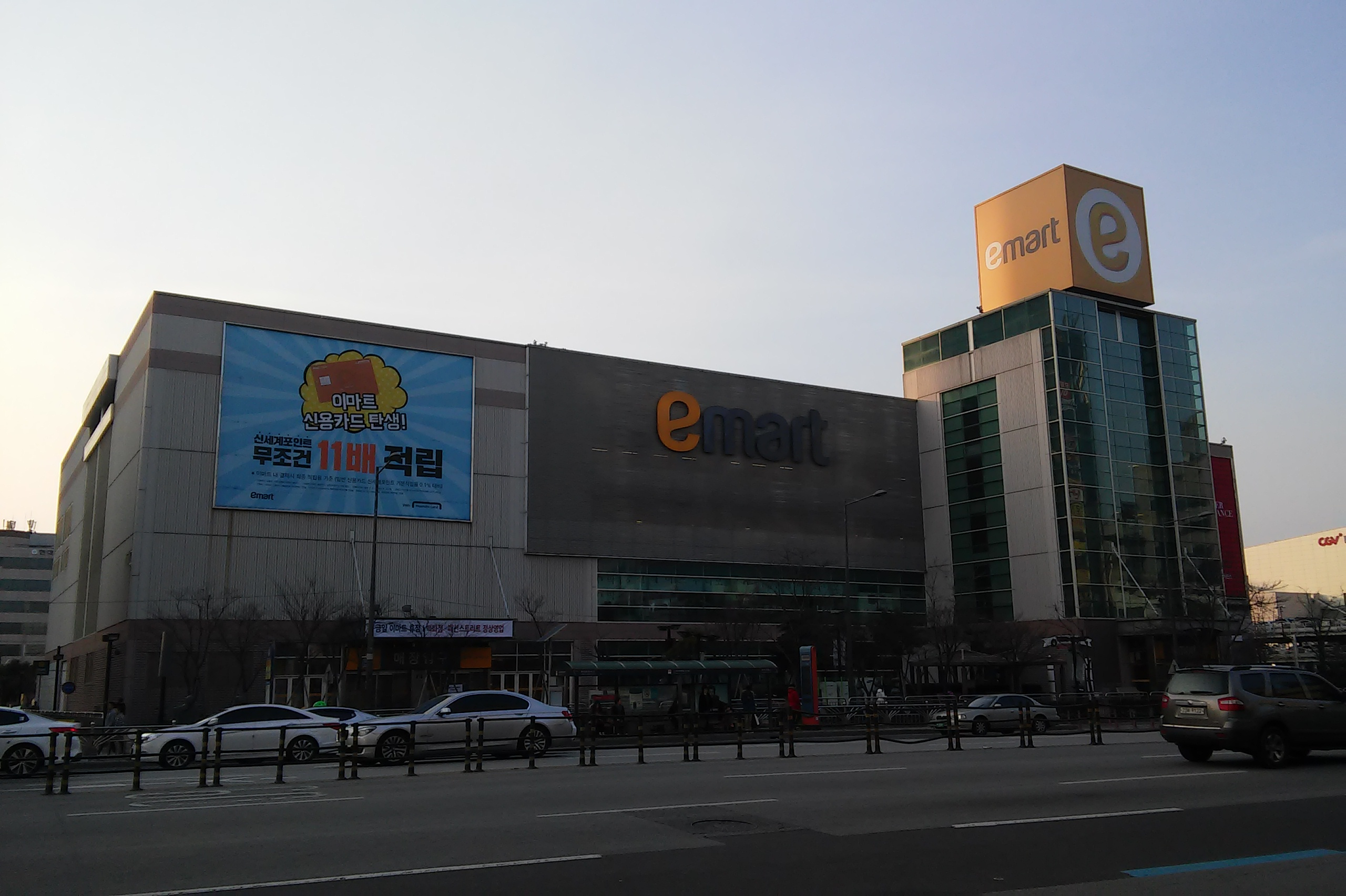
E-mart in South Korea

The largest hypermarket chains are E-Mart (Shinsegae Group), Lotte Mart (Lotte) and Homeplus.

- Costco
- E-Mart
- Homeplus
- Lotte Mart

=== Sri Lanka ===
- Cargills (Ceylon) PLC
- Keells Super
- Arpico Super Centre

=== Taiwan ===
- Carrefour
- Costco
- A.mart
- RT-Mart

=== Thailand ===
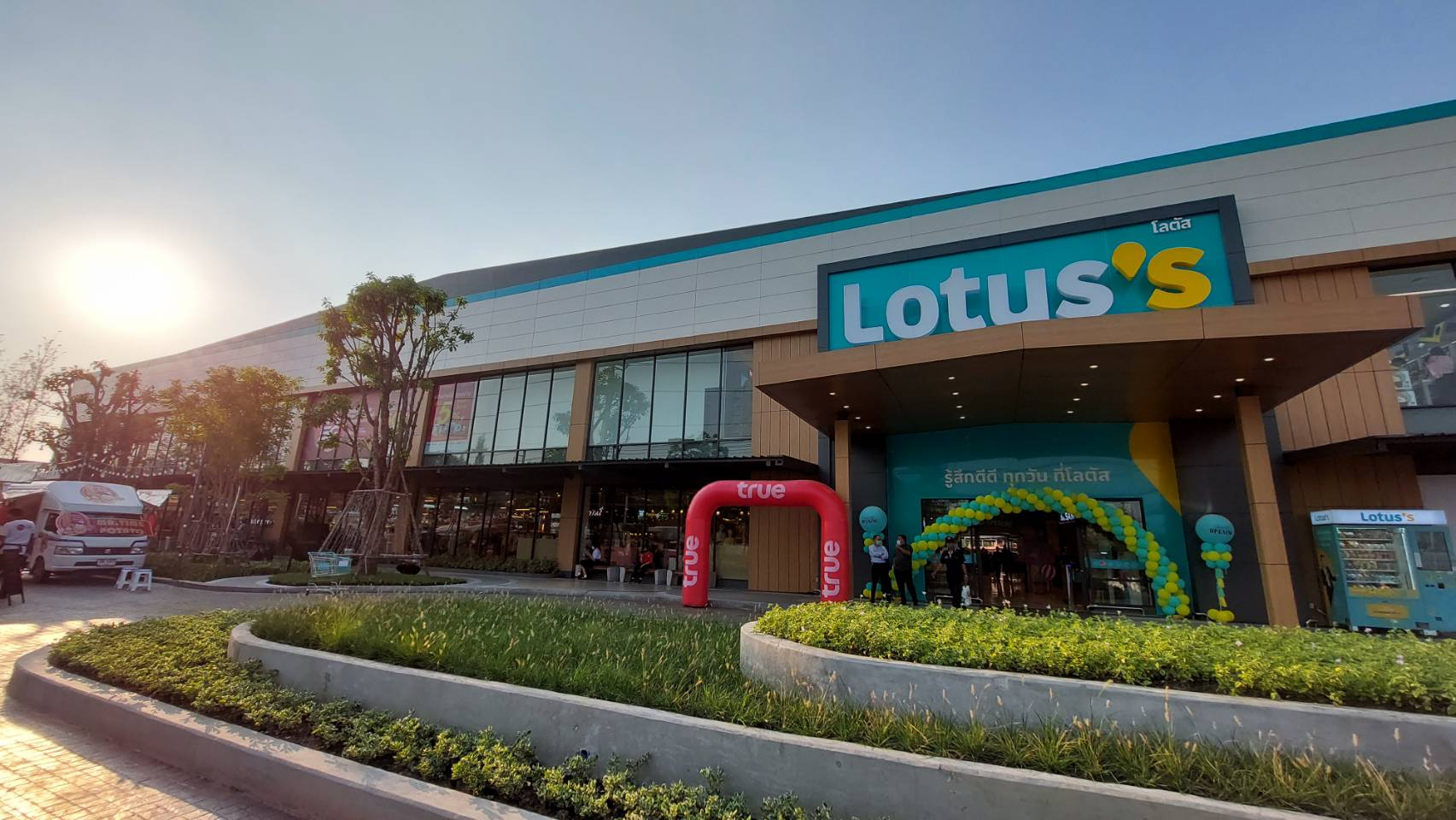
Lotus's in Nonthaburi, Thailand

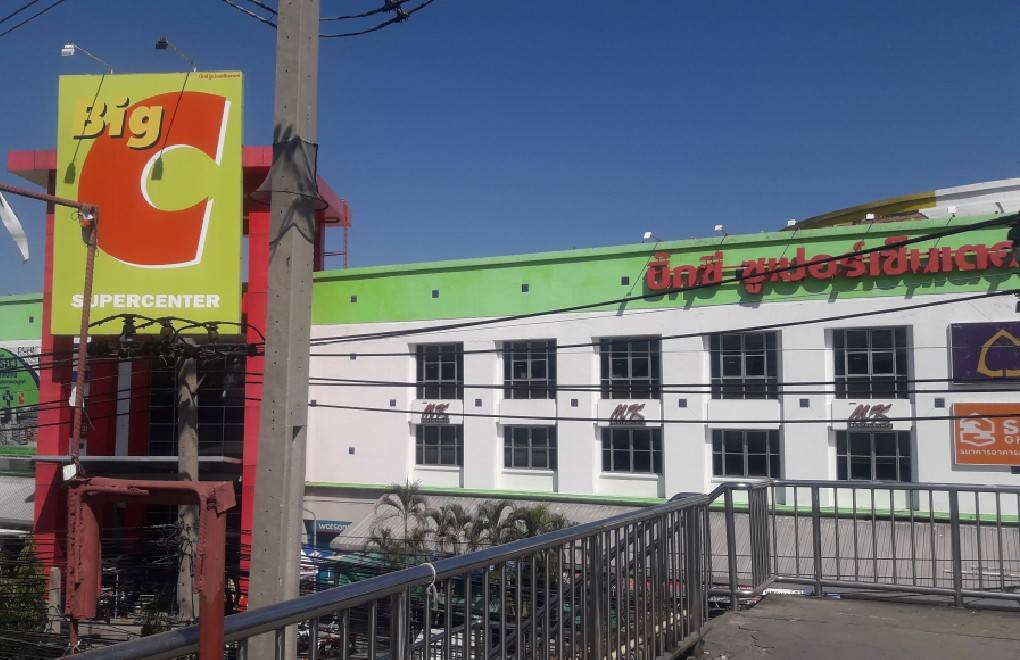
Big C in Bangkok, Thailand

- Big C
- Makro
- Maxvalu Tokai
- Lotus's
- Tops Supermarket

=== Turkmenistan ===
The country's first hypermarket will be in a 100,000 square meter shopping center, in the capital Ashgabat, scheduled to open in 2014. The complex will include the hypermarket, offices, a cinema, boutiques and a parking lot that will accommodate around 1400 cars. It is yet unknown to which retailer Turkmenistan's first hypermarket will belong.

=== United Arab Emirates ===
- Carrefour
- Géant
- Lulu Hypermarket
- Nesto
- Spinneys

=== Uzbekistan ===
- Korzinka

=== Vietnam ===
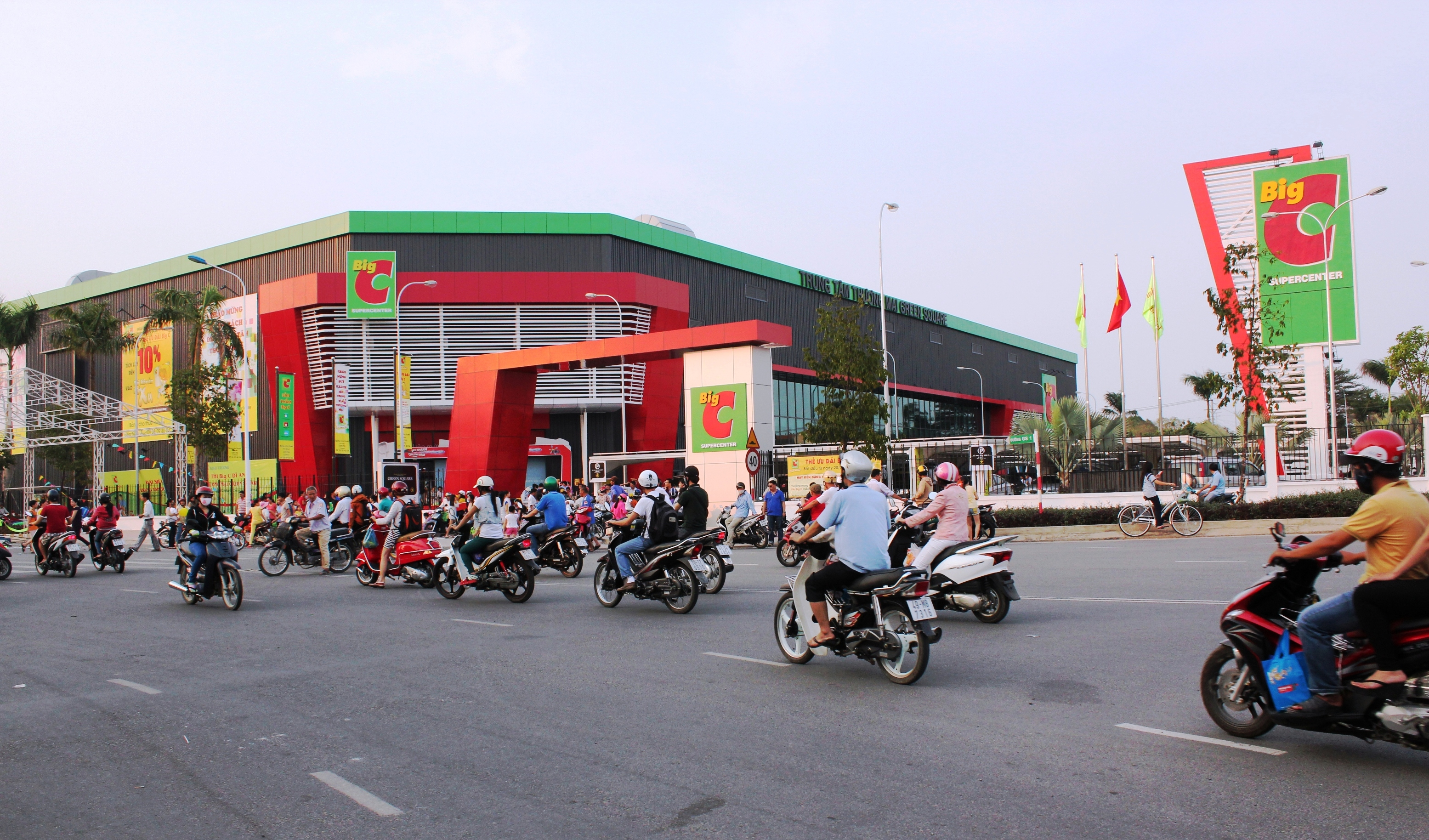
Big C hypermarket in Vietnam

- Aeon
- Auchan
- Big C
- eMart
- Giant
- Lotte Mart
- Metro

=== Yemen ===
- Lulu Hypermarket
- Géant

== Europe ==
=== Albania ===
Defunct

- Carrefour – 1 hypermarket in Tirana
- Mercator – 1 hypermarket in Tirana

=== Andorra ===
- E.Leclerc

=== Austria ===
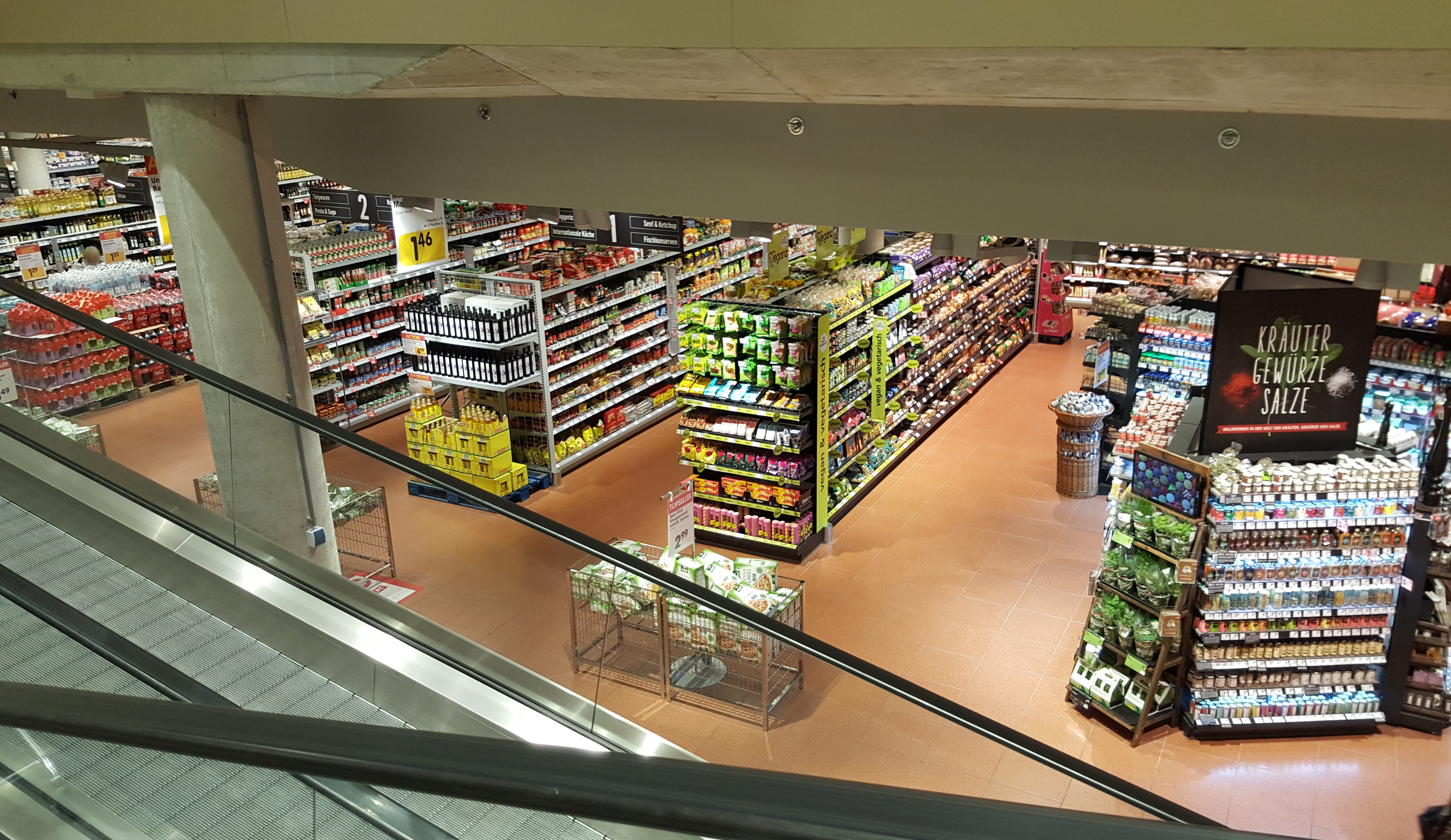
Hypermarket Interspar Austria in Vienna-Floridsdorf

- Interspar

Defunct

- Carrefour

=== Belarus ===
- Almi
- Bigzz
- Euroopt
- Gippo (Гиппо)
- Korona
- ProStore

=== Belgium ===
In the early 1960s, the first Superbazar (later Maxi GB and Bigg's) hypermarkets were created in Belgium in Auderghem, Anderlecht and Bruges.

In 2000, the French Carrefour Group took over the Belgian GB Group, all Maxi GB and Bigg's hypermarket stores were then rebranded Carrefour hypermarkets.

In 2007, there were 63 hypermarkets in the country. In May 2013, there were in total 67, of which were 45 regular Carrefour hypermarkets and 15 were new Carrefour Planet hypermarkets. The Louis Delhaize Group has seven Cora throughout Wallonia and Brussels.

The largest hypermarket in Belgium is the Cora store in Anderlecht (Brussels) with a size of 15 000 m^{2}. The second largest is the Carrefour Planet store in the B-Park shopping center in Bruges (Flanders), which has a size of 14 000 m^{2}.

- Carrefour
- Cora

=== Bosnia and Herzegovina ===
- Bingo
- Konzum
- Mercator

Defunct brands

- Drvopromet DP – renamed Mercator in 2011, then Konzum in 2014, and again Mercator in 2017
- VF-Komerc – renamed Konzum in 2007

=== Bulgaria ===
- HIT
- Kaufland

=== Croatia ===
- Interspar
- Kaufland
- Konzum

Defunct brands

- Hipermarketi Coop – renamed Interspar in 2010
- Mercator – renamed Konzum in 2014

=== Cyprus ===
- AlphaMega
- Sklavenitis

Defunct

- Carrefour – stores taken over by Sklavenitis

=== Czech Republic ===
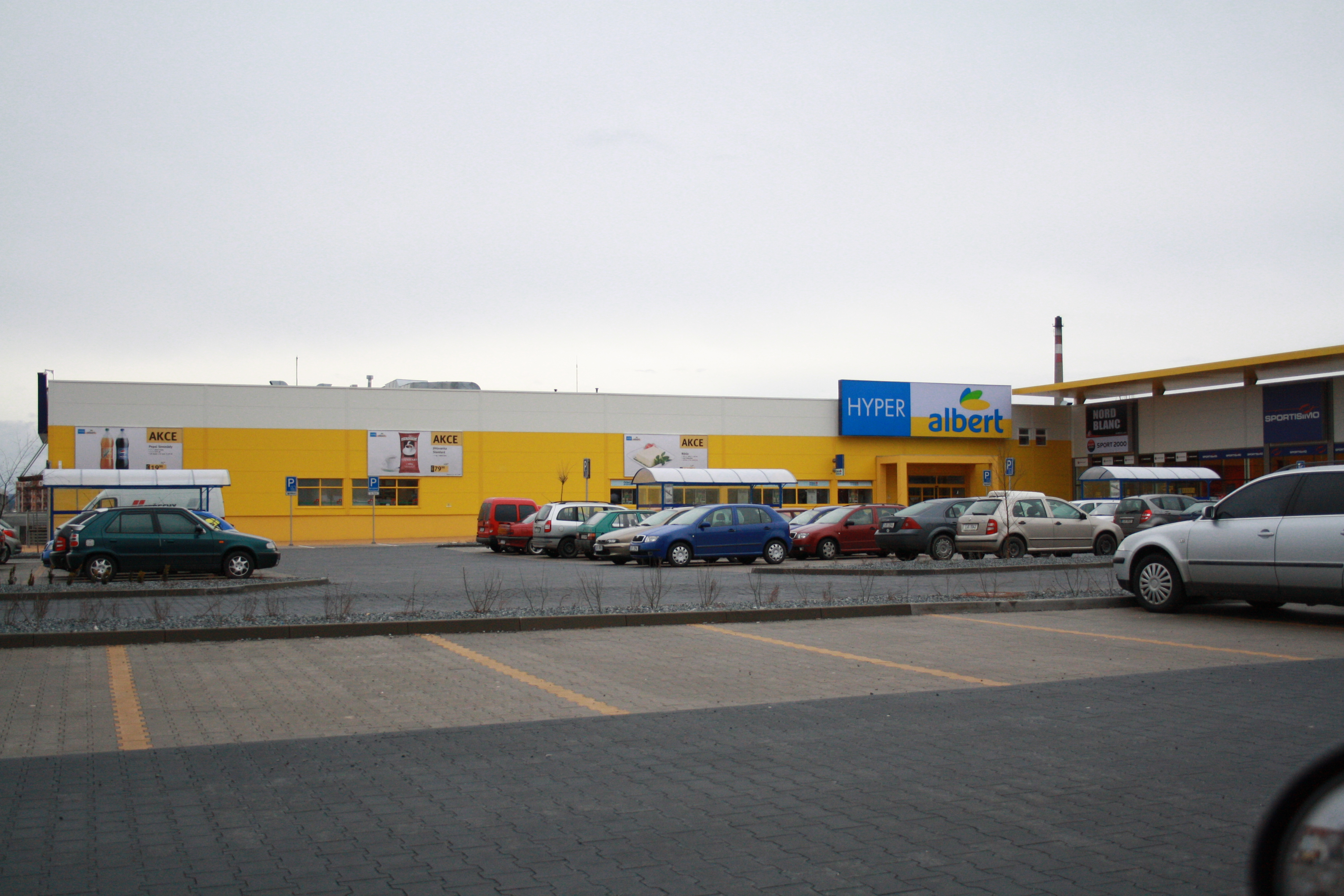
Albert Hypermarket in Třebíč, Czech Republic

- Albert
- Globus
- Kaufland
- Tesco

Defunct

- Carrefour – stores taken over by Tesco
- Interspar (Spar Group) – in 2015, stores taken over by Ahold and rebranded Albert

=== Denmark ===
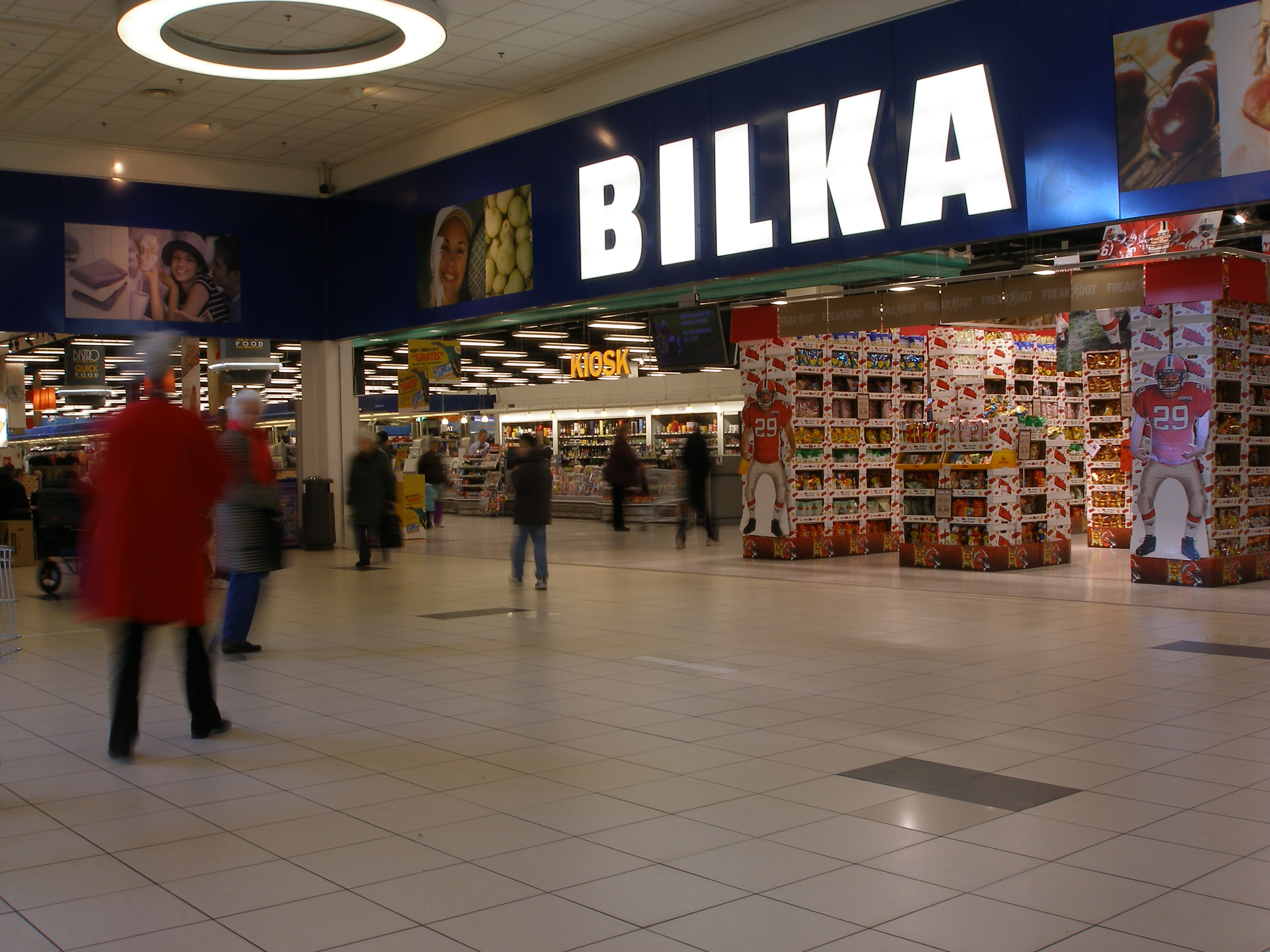
Bilka hypermarket in Ishoj, Denmark

Currently, Bilka is the biggest chain of hypermarkets (operated by Dansk Supermarked); the second biggest chain was Kvickly Xtra, which were converted in 2009 to the regular Kvickly supermarkets. Opening of new hypermarkets has decreased, as of 2010, due to restrictions on store sizes to protect the stores in city centers.

- Bilka

=== Estonia ===
- Maxima
- Prisma
- Rimi Hyper
- Selver

=== Finland ===
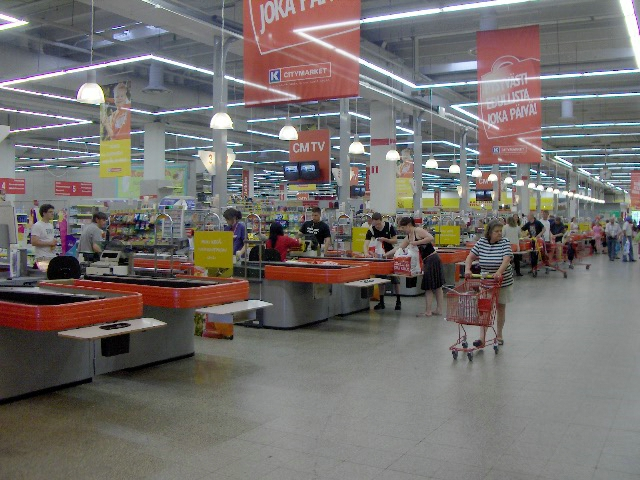
K-Citymarket hypermarket in Helsinki, Finland

- K-Citymarket
- Minimani
- Pick N Pay
- Prisma

Defunct

- Euromarket
- Etujätti
- Maxi (hypermarket)

=== France ===
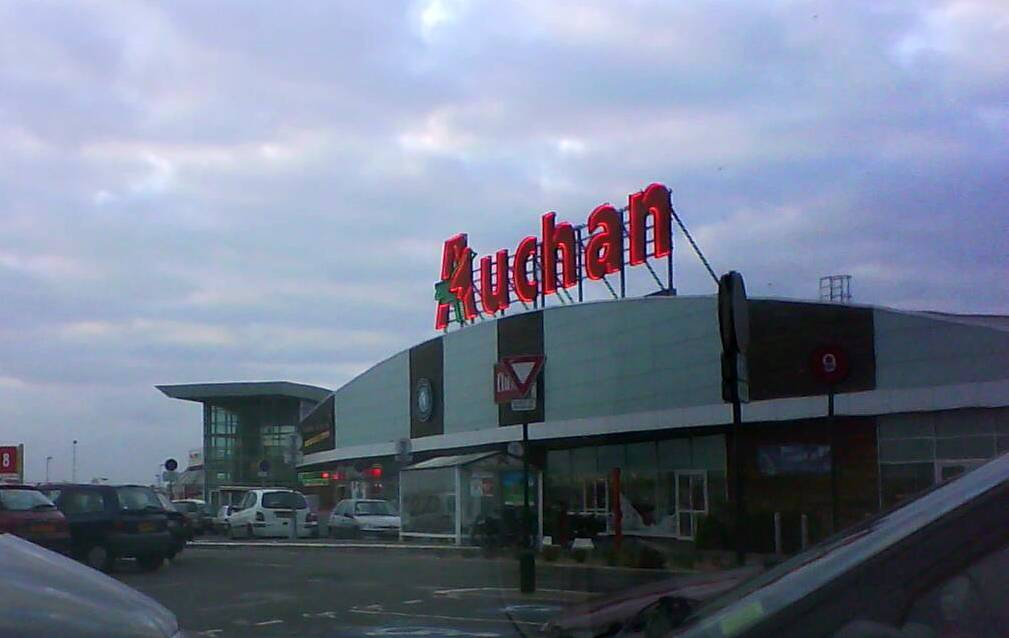
An Auchan hypermarket in Coquelles near Calais, France

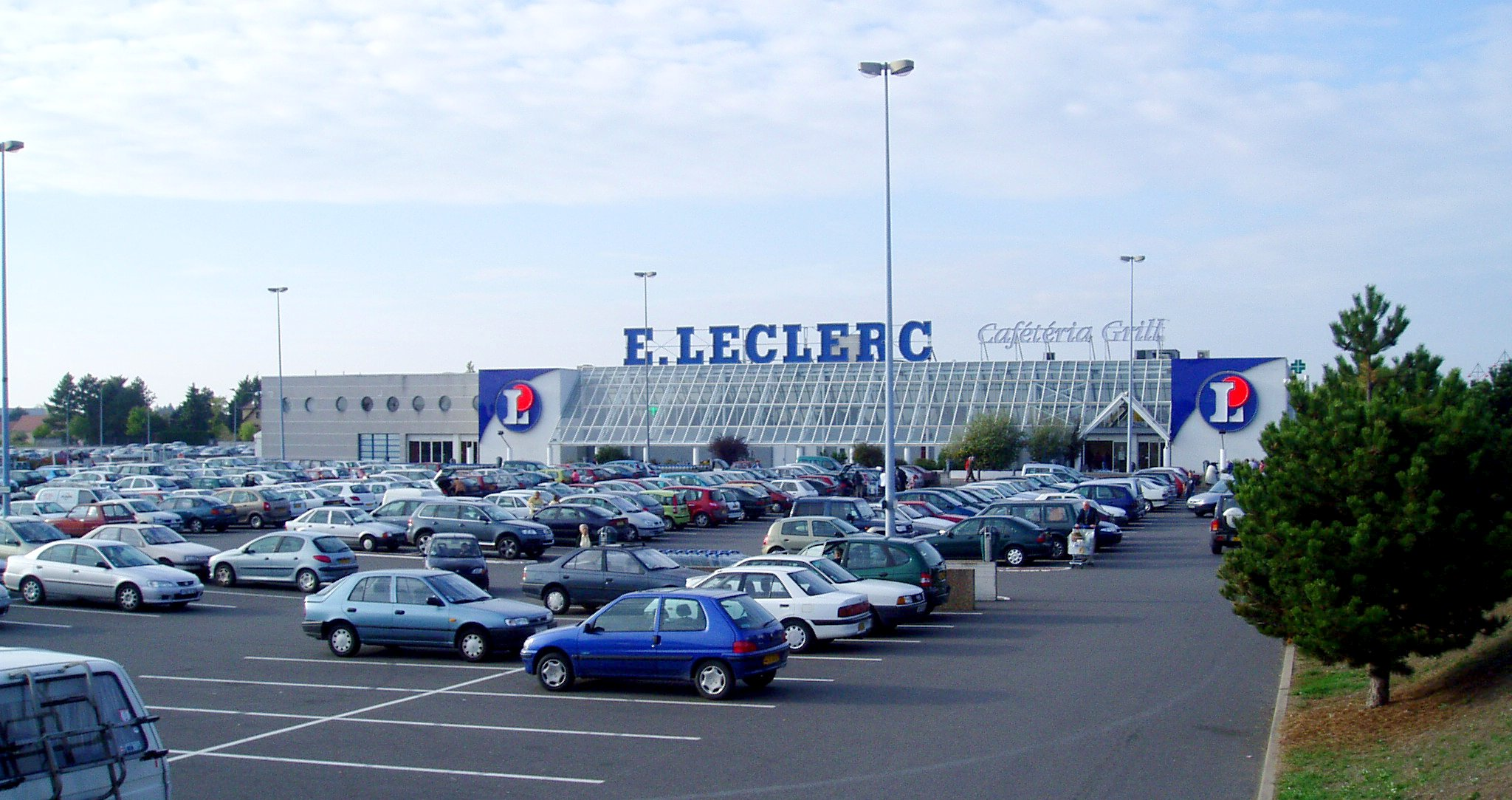
E.Leclerc hypermarket in Allier

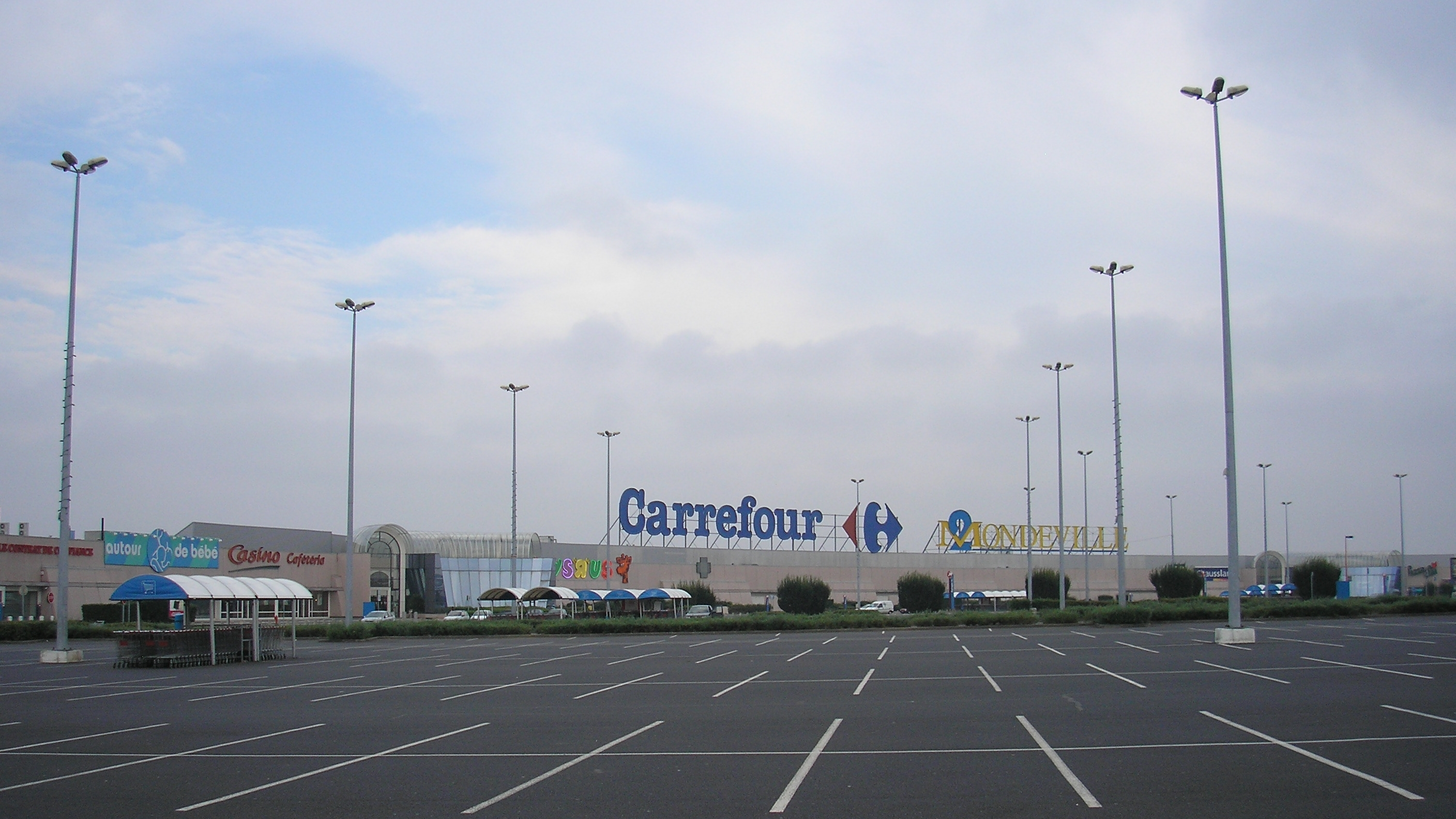
Carrefour at the shopping mall of Mondeville 2 in Normandy, France

In France, hypermarkets are successful, and today, there are over 1000 hypermarkets in the country. Carrefour opened the first French and European hypermarket in 1963, in Sainte-Geneviève-des-Bois near Paris, and has 222 hypermarkets, as of 2013. The largest hypermarket in France is the Carrefour store in Villiers-en-Bière, Seine-et-Marne (77) in the Île-de-France region, with an area of 25 000 m^{2}.

E.Leclerc opened its first hypermarket store in 1964 in Landerneau, near Brest, and is now the dominant hypermarket chain in France, with 489 hypermarkets. Internationally, the French Carrefour is still the largest hypermarket chain in terms of size, and second-largest (after Walmart) in terms of revenue.

The other chains with the most hypermarkets in France are Géant (120 hypermarkets), Auchan (134) and Hyper U (61).

In Corsica, hypermarkets are not as successful as in the rest of France; the only hypermarkets available in Corsica are Carrefour, Hyper U, E.Leclerc, Géant and Casino.

- Auchan
- Carrefour
- E.Leclerc
- Hyper U
- Intermarché Hyper
- Migros MMM

Defunct

- Continent – all became Carrefour in 2000
- Eroski
- Euromarché
- Hyper Cedico
- HyperChampion
- Mammouth – The first Mammouth store opened in 1969 near Troyes, and the last store closed in Lacroix-Saint-Ouen on 3 October 2009 after a 10-year delay to close the last store, as it was considered too small for an Auchan hypermarket, but too large for an ATAC supermarket.
- Rallye – first store opened in Brest in 1968; last closed in 2002
- Record – operated from 1967 to 2008; the last Record store in Grosbliederstroff subsisted up until 3 June 2022, when it was converted into a Cora.
- Super Suma – became ATAC
- Géant Casino – most of its activities in continental France were sold off by Groupe Casino in 2023 to various other retailers, mainly Intermarché and Auchan. The 26 remaining stores that have not been taken over are set to permanently close on 30 September 2024. Four Géant stores are still active, all located in Corsica.
- Cora – bought by Carrefour in July 2023. All stores are set to be converted into Carrefour hypermarkets by 17 November 2024.

=== Germany ===
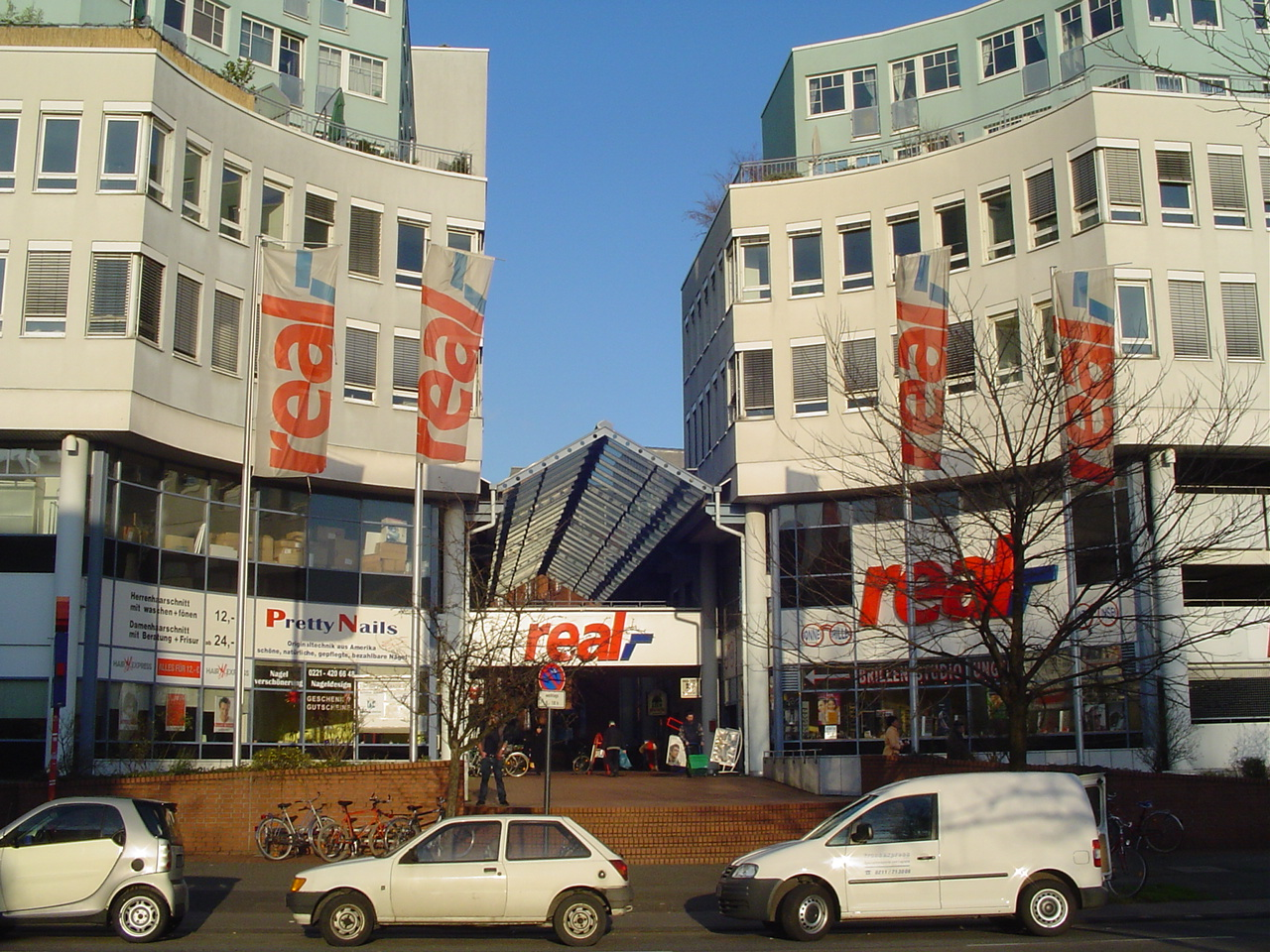
Real hypermarket in Cologne, Germany

In Germany, the biggest hypermarket brands are Real (METRO AG), Kaufland (which belongs to Lidl), and Marktkauf (which is a brand of AVA, which in turn belongs to EDEKA). However, for various reasons, such as the strong competition by more focused discounters such as Aldi and Lidl, as well as legal restrictions on store size, pricing policy, and opening times, the hypermarket concept is not as widespread in Germany as in other countries.

- E-Center
- Famila
- Globus
- HIT
- Kaufland
- Marktkauf
- Real
- Rewe Center

Defunct

- Extra Future Store – first store opened in 2003 in Rheinberg; taken over by Real in 2008, which converted it to new Real Future Store hypermarkets
- Interspar – all stores were taken over by Wal-Mart in 1998
- Toom – rebranded to Rewe Center in 2014
- Wal-Mart – moved into Germany in 1997 by taking over Wertkauf stores, followed by Interspar stores the year after, but failed by trying to use its American approach in Germany; in 2006 the remaining 85 hypermarkets were changed to Real hypermarkets.
- Wertkauf – first store opened in 1958 in Karlsruhe, its Munich store was the largest hypermarket in Europe when it opened in 1968; all stores were taken over by Wal-Mart in 1997

=== Greece ===
- Grand Masoutis
- Sklavenitis

Defunct

- Carrefour – bought by Sklavenitis

=== Hungary ===
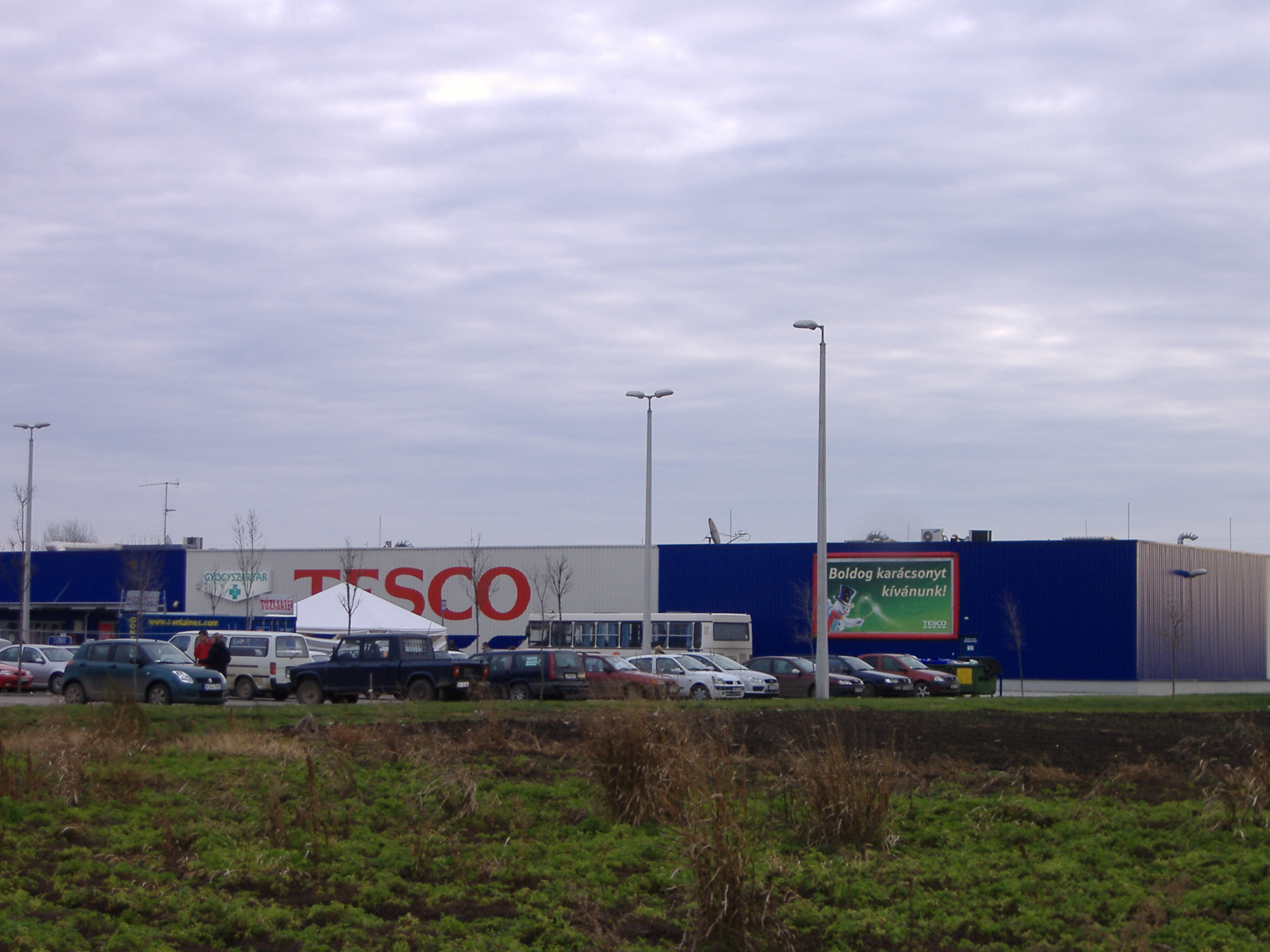
A Hungarian Tesco hypermarket in Makó

The biggest hypermarket presence is Tesco. Other hypermarkets include Auchan, Metro (Cash & Carry) and InterSpar, which operate several hypermarkets in the country.

- Auchan
- Interspar
- Tesco

Defunct

- Cora (acquired by Auchan)

=== Iceland ===
- Costco
- Hagkaup

=== Ireland ===
Tesco in Clonmel, Ireland

- Dunnes Stores
- Tesco Ireland (Tesco Extra stores)

=== Italy ===
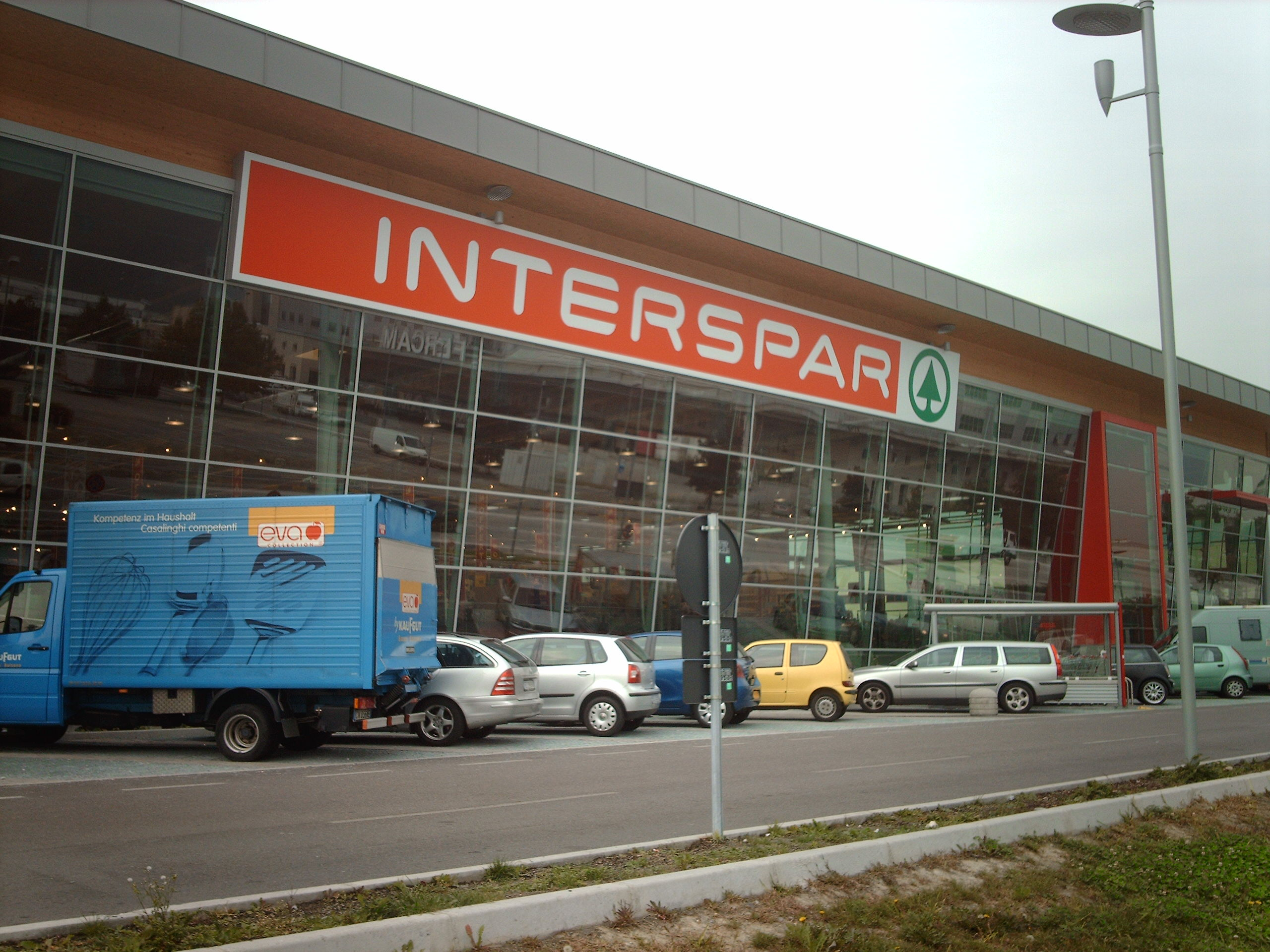
Interspar hypermarket in Bolzano, Italy

In Italy and Italian-speaking parts of Switzerland, the term is ipermercati.

- Bennet
- Carrefour
- Spazio Conad
- Ipermercato Crai
- Esselunga Superstore
- Il Gigante
- Interspar / Iperspar
- Iper La Grande I
- Ipercoop
- IperSimply / (Auchan) (closed in 2020 and sold to Conad)
- Italmark
- Sidis (Ipersidis, Sidis Superstore, Oasi, Migross Superstore, La Girandola, Decò Superstore, L'IperConveniente, MioMercato Superstore and Iper MioMercato)
- Super Spaccio Alimentare

Defunct

- Auchan City – sold to Coop Italia in 2017 and rebranded Ipercoop
- Billa Superstore – closed in 2013 and rebranded Conad and Carrefour
- CittàMercato – rebranded Auchan
- Cityper – rebranded IperSimply
- E.Leclerc – rebranded Conad in 2014 due to the end of the joint-venture between the two chains
- IperCoopca – closed in 2015 due to Coopca's failure
- IperLeDune – rebranded Interspar in 2015
- IperPellicano – closed in 2013 due to Lombardini Holding's bankruptcy
- IperStanda – rebranded Billa Superstore in 2010
- Megasidis – sold to Auchan in 2012 and then to Coop Italia in 2017

=== Latvia ===
- Maxima
- Rimi Hyper

Defunct

- Prisma

=== Lithuania ===
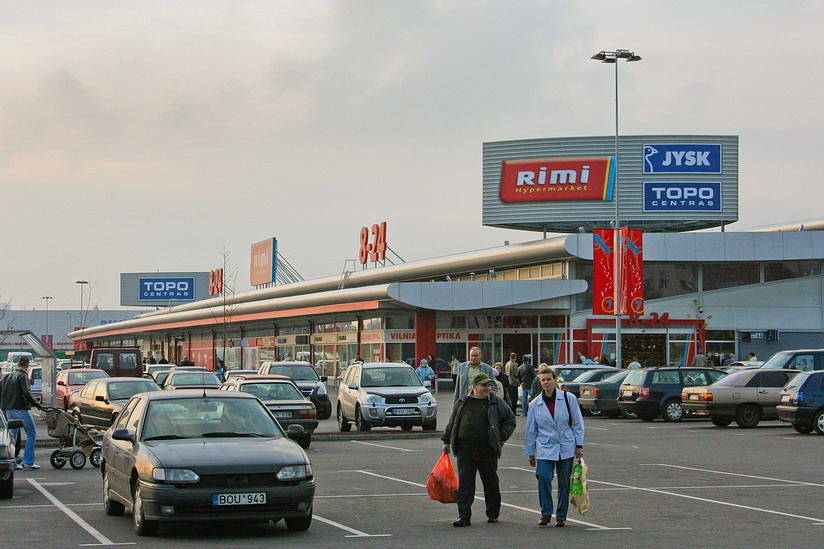
Rimi hypermarket near Vilnius, Lithuania

There are several hypermarkets, like the homegrown chain of Maxima supermarkets in Lithuania, which range in sizes from neighborhood convenience stores to giant supercenters or hypermarkets that stock over 65,000 SKUs. The chain has 499 (as of 2013) stores open throughout Lithuania, Latvia, Estonia, Bulgaria (branded as T-Market) and Poland (branded as Aldik Nova).

- Maxima
- Norfa
- Rimi Hyper

Defunct

- Prisma

=== Luxembourg ===
- Auchan
- Cactus
- Cora

=== Malta ===
- Pavi Supermarket (1 hypermarket)

=== Moldova ===
- Kaufland

=== Monaco ===
- Carrefour (1 hypermarket)

=== Netherlands ===
In the Netherlands hypermarkets were not a success; there were several attempts of retailers like Ahold and SHV but they all eventually failed.

In 1971, Schuitema opened their first Dutch hypermarkets, Famila and Ahold with Miro in Vlissingen. In 1973, SHV Holdings opened Trefcenter. Shortly after, Maxis was created by De Bijenkorf. However, all these hypermarkets failed, and all closed in the 1980s.

In the late 1990s, the American chain A&P started operating supermarkets and several hypermarkets by taking over old Maxis stores. The A&P chain wasn't very successful. C1000 took over the stores in 2000–2003, and the hypermarkets were converted to C1000 supermarkets.

Since 2006, the German chain Famila (currently operating hypermarkets in the north of Germany and Italy) has tried to return in the Netherlands by opening a Dutch hypermarket in Emmen and then expanding in a few years to about 25 hypermarkets between 4,500 and 7,000 square meters. J. Bünting Beteiligungs AG from Leer (Germany) had therefore opened an office in Drachten. However, as of 2013 there were still no Famila stores in the country.

On March 27, 2013, the largest supermarket of the Netherlands was opened by Jumbo in the city of Breda, called Jumbo Foodmarkt. With around 6,000 square meters, this store can be considered a hypermarket, but does not offer non-food products, which is unlike most hypermarkets. The second Jumbo Foodmarkt was planned to open with a size of 7,000 square meters in the unfinished Focus-U-Park shopping center of 30,000 square meters in Steenwijk. However, permits for construction of the Focus U Park were retracted in 2020.

- Albert Heijn XL (2,800–4,500 m^{2})
- Jumbo Foodmarkt (6,000–8,000 m^{2})

Defunct brands

- A&P Hypermarkt
- Famila
- Maxis
- Miro

=== North Macedonia ===
Defunct

- Carrefour – 1 hypermarket closed in 2016

=== Norway ===
There are Coop Obs! owned by Coop Norge, which operates 24 hypermarkets through the country. Coop Norge also owns three Smart Club outlets (Warehouse club). Other hypermarkets include EuroSpar, a hypermarket brand of Spar, and ICA AB, with ICA Maxi stores.

- Coop Obs!
- Eurospar
- Smart Club

Defunct

- Kvickly Xtra (defunct since 2010; earlier known as Obs!)
- ICA Maxi (defunct since 2012)

=== Poland ===
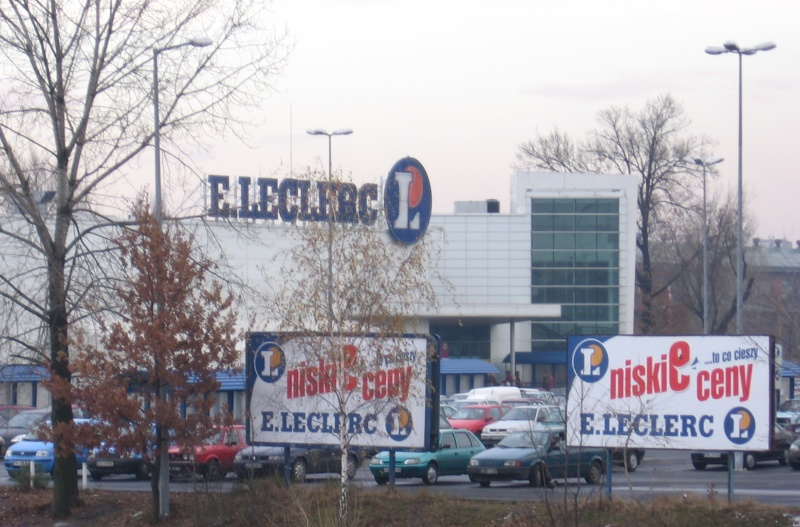
A Polish E. Leclerc in Wrocław, Poland

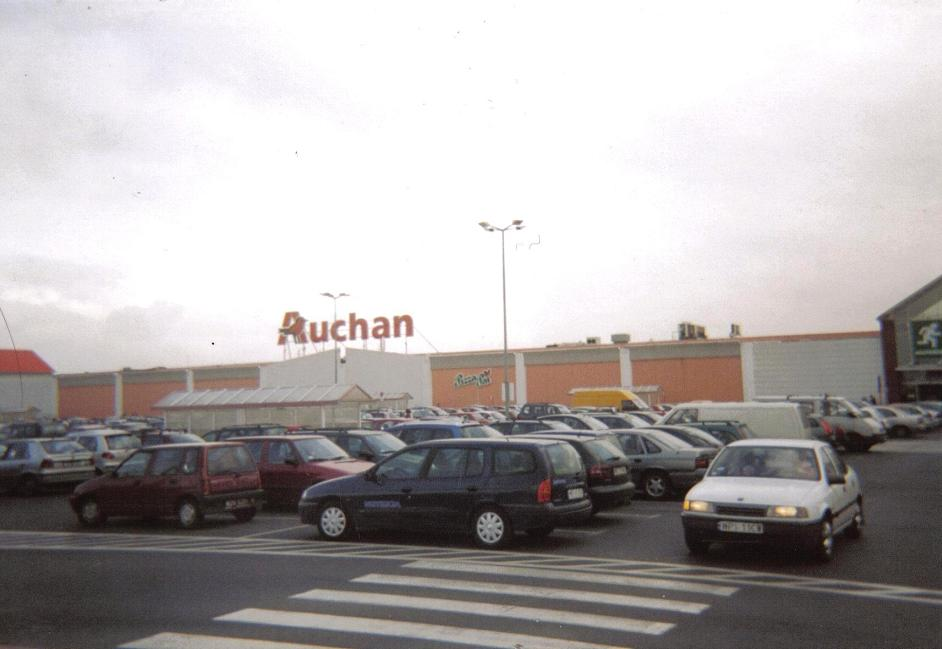
Auchan in Piaseczno, Poland

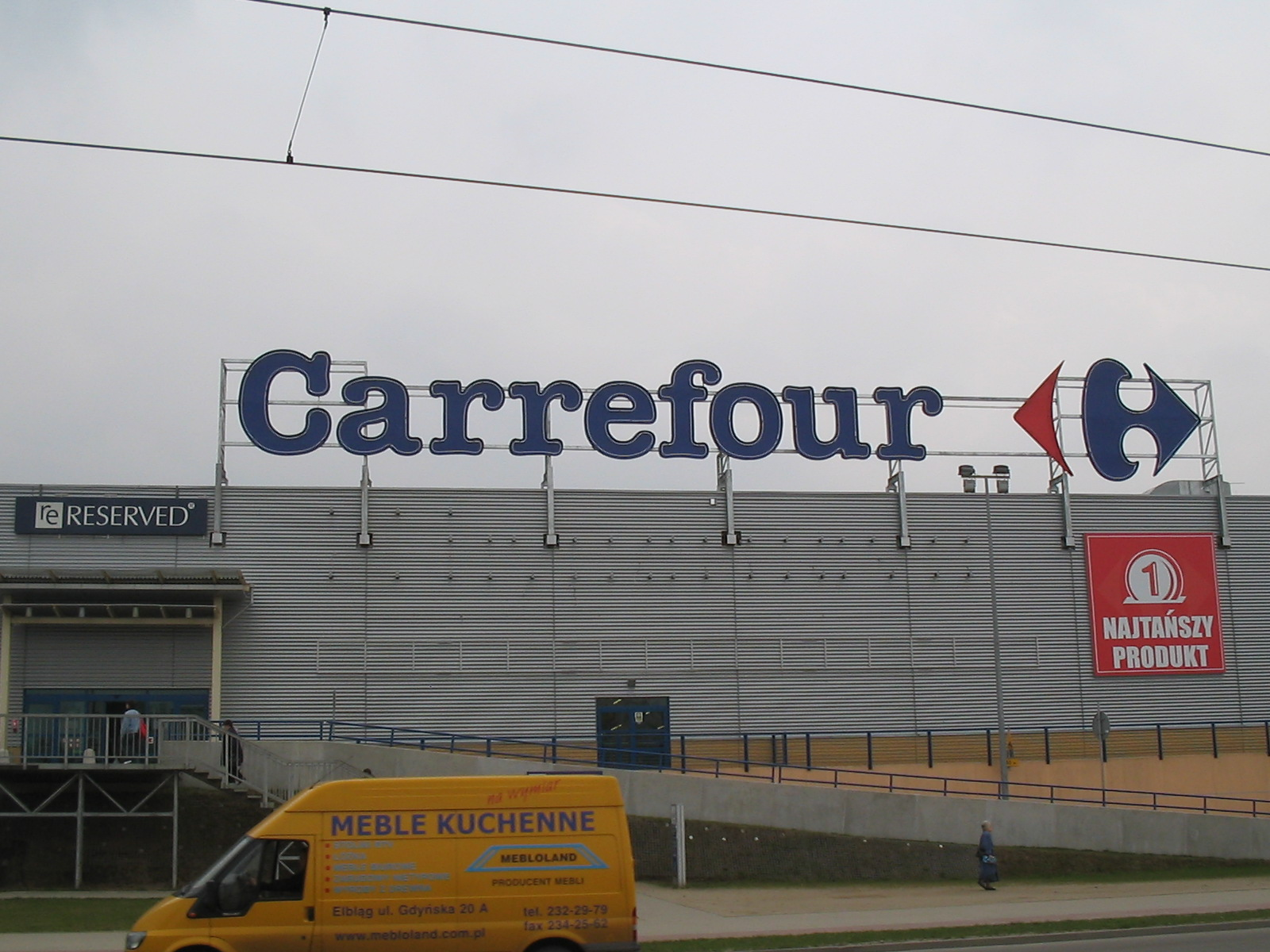
Carrefour store in Elbląg, Poland

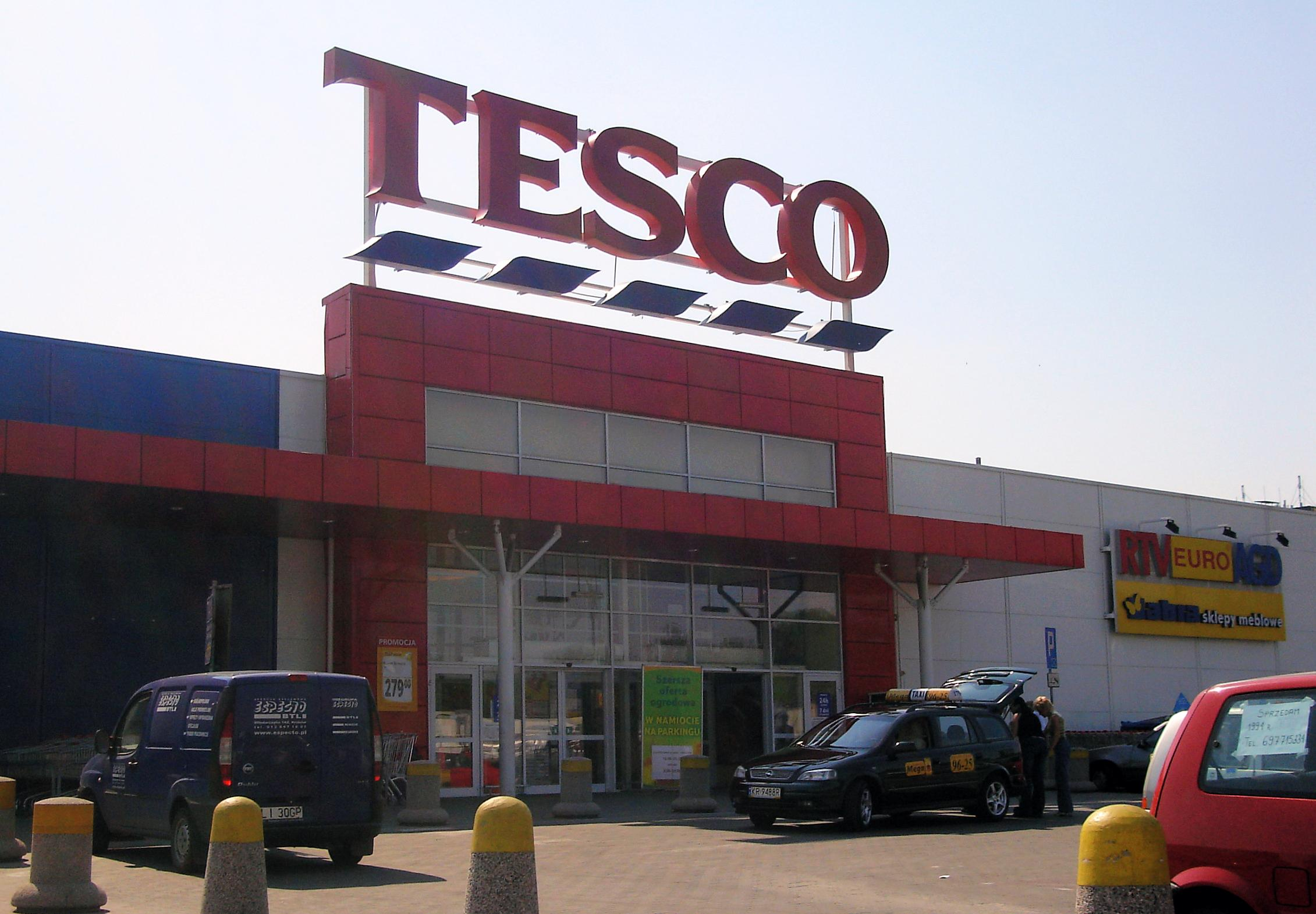
A Tesco hypermarket store in New Prokocim, Kraków in Poland

- Auchan
- bi1
- Carrefour
- E.Leclerc
- Kaufland

Defunct

- Real – acquired by Auchan in 2012
- Tesco

=== Portugal ===
In Portugal, there are a considerable number of hypermarket chains in operation, including Continente (the biggest and the first Portuguese chain to go international), Auchan, Pingo Doce, Lidl and Intermarché. Most of these chains also operate supermarkets and smaller stores.

- Auchan
- Continente (Sonae group)
- E.Leclerc
- Intermarché
- Pingo Doce (Jerónimo Martins group)

=== Romania ===
- Auchan
- Carrefour
- Cora
- Kaufland

Defunct

- Real – acquired by Auchan in 2012

=== Russia ===
- Auchan (Ашан)
- Globus
- Karusel (Карусель)
- Lenta (Лента)
- Liniya (Линия)
- Magnit (Russia's largest retailer)
- Nash Hypermarket (Наш Гипермаркет)
- OK (О'Кей)
- Prisma
- Spar
- Vester (Вестер)

Defunct

- Real – acquired by Auchan in 2012

=== Serbia ===
- DIS
- Mercator
- Roda
- SuperVero (Veropoulos)
- Tempo Centar (Delhaize)

Defunct

- Tuš

=== Slovakia ===
- Hypernova
- Kaufland
- Tesco

Defunct

- Carrefour

=== Slovenia ===
- E.Leclerc
- Interspar (Spar Group)
- Mercator
- Tuš

=== Spain ===
- Alcampo (Auchan)
- Carrefour
- E.Leclerc
- Eroski
- Hipercor

Defunct

- Continente – rebranded to Carrefour
- Sabeco – rebranded to Alcampo

=== Sweden ===
- City Gross
- Costco
- Stora Coop
- ICA Maxi

=== Switzerland ===
There are currently two chains operating hypermarkets in the country. Coop Switzerland owns 13 hypermarkets throughout the West, with the biggest stores situated in Geneva and Fribourg. The Migros chain has 11 MMM hypermarkets, including some in Lausanne, Basel, and two in France which are both near Geneva, one in Thoiry and Étrembières.

Until 22 March 2013, Casino-Magro had several HyperCasino hypermarkets in Switzerland until the bankruptcy of the Magro group.

- Coop
- Migros (MMM)

Defunct

- Carrefour
- HyperCasino

=== Turkey ===
- Carrefour (acquired by Big C in Jan 2011)
- Migros Türk (5M MİGROS)

and many other local hypermarkets

Defunct

- Jusco (replaced by Max Value)
- Real

=== Ukraine ===
- Auchan
- Novus

Defunct

- Real – acquired by Auchan

=== United Kingdom ===
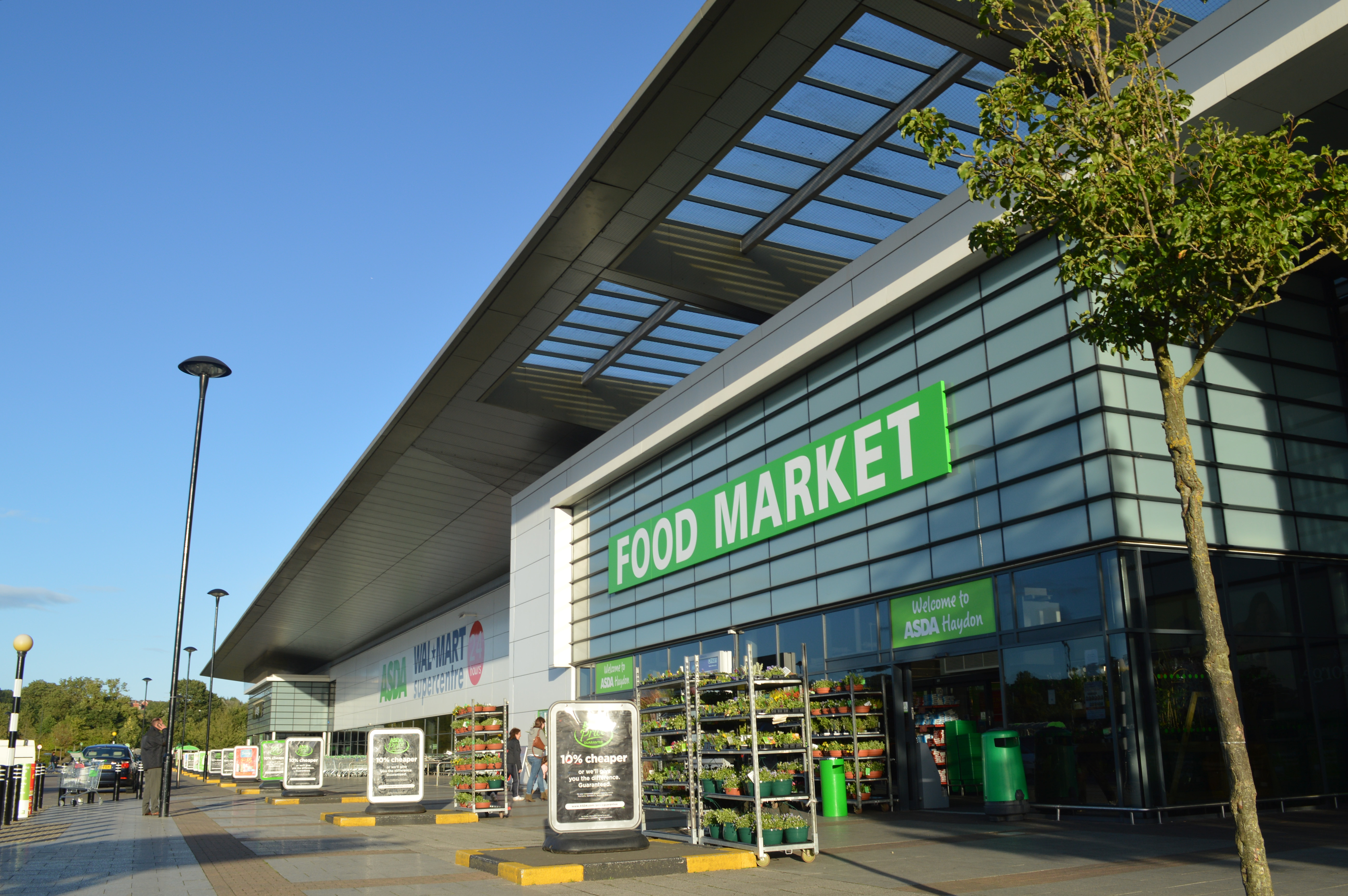
Asda

The largest chains in the UK are Tesco, Asda and Sainsbury's, which all operate hypermarkets in the country.

- Asda
- Sainsbury's
- Tesco Extra

Defunct

- Carrefour – first Carrefour store opened in the 1970s; UK business was sold to Gateway/Somerfield in 1990 and later was sold to Asda
- Sainsbury's Savacentre – joint ventures between Sainsbury's and BHS, later rebranded Sainsbury's Superstores

== North America ==
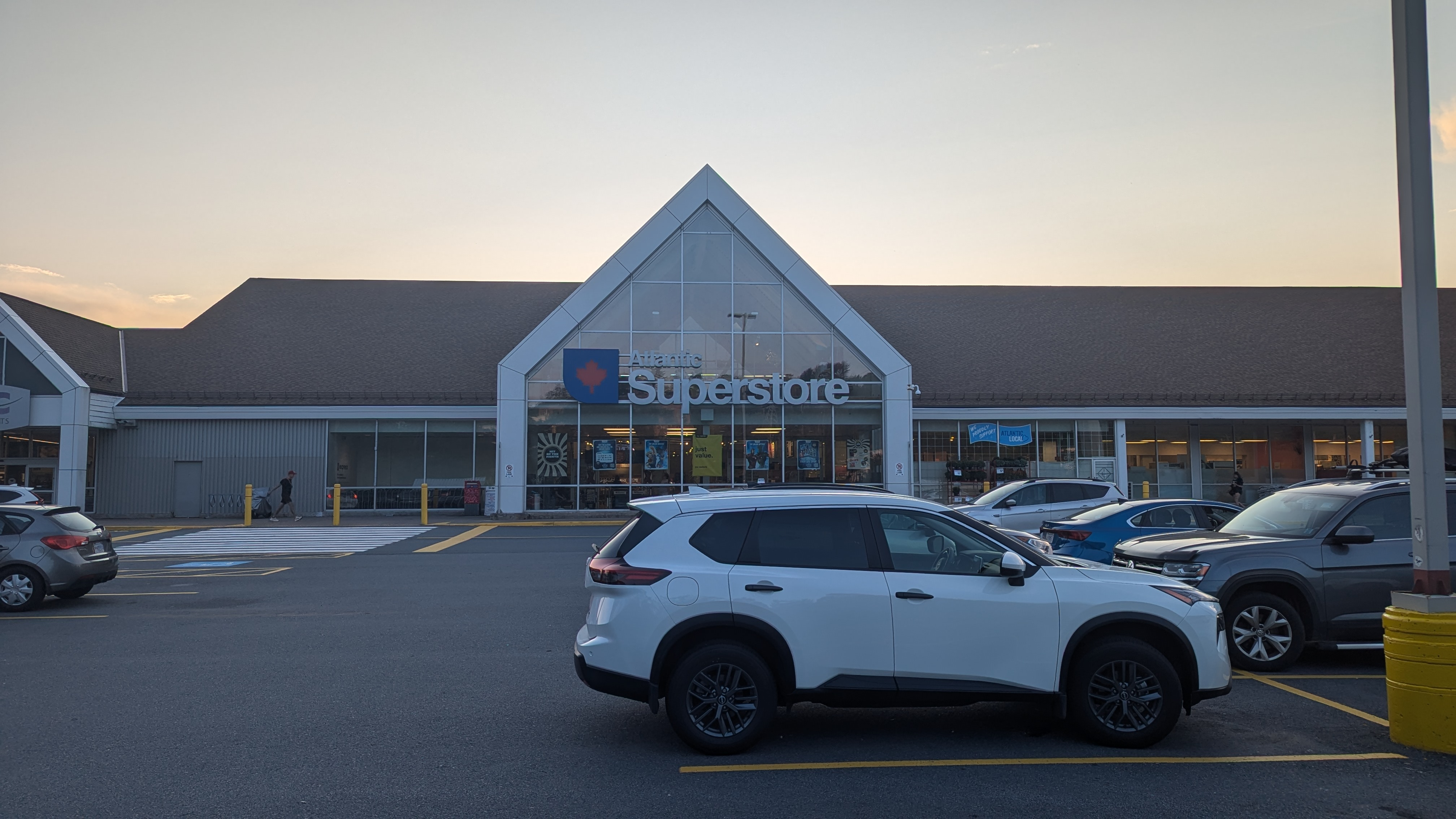
Real Atlantic Superstore in Bedford, Nova Scotia, Canada

=== Canada ===
- Loblaw Companies owns and operates:
  - Maxi & Cie (in Quebec)
  - Real Atlantic Superstore (in the Maritimes)
  - Real Canadian Superstore
- NorthMart (in the territories and Labrador)
- Walmart Supercentre

=== Costa Rica ===
- Walmart

=== Dominican Republic ===
- Hipermercados Olé
- La Sirena
- Carrefour
- Jumbo

=== Honduras ===
- Walmart

=== Mexico ===
- Casa Ley
- Chedraui
- Soriana
- Walmex (Walmart

Defunct

- Carrefour – all rebranded Chedraui] in early 2000s
- Comercial Mexicana – purchased by Soriana in 2016 and defunct by May 2018

=== Nicaragua ===
- PriceSmart
- Walmart

=== Panama ===
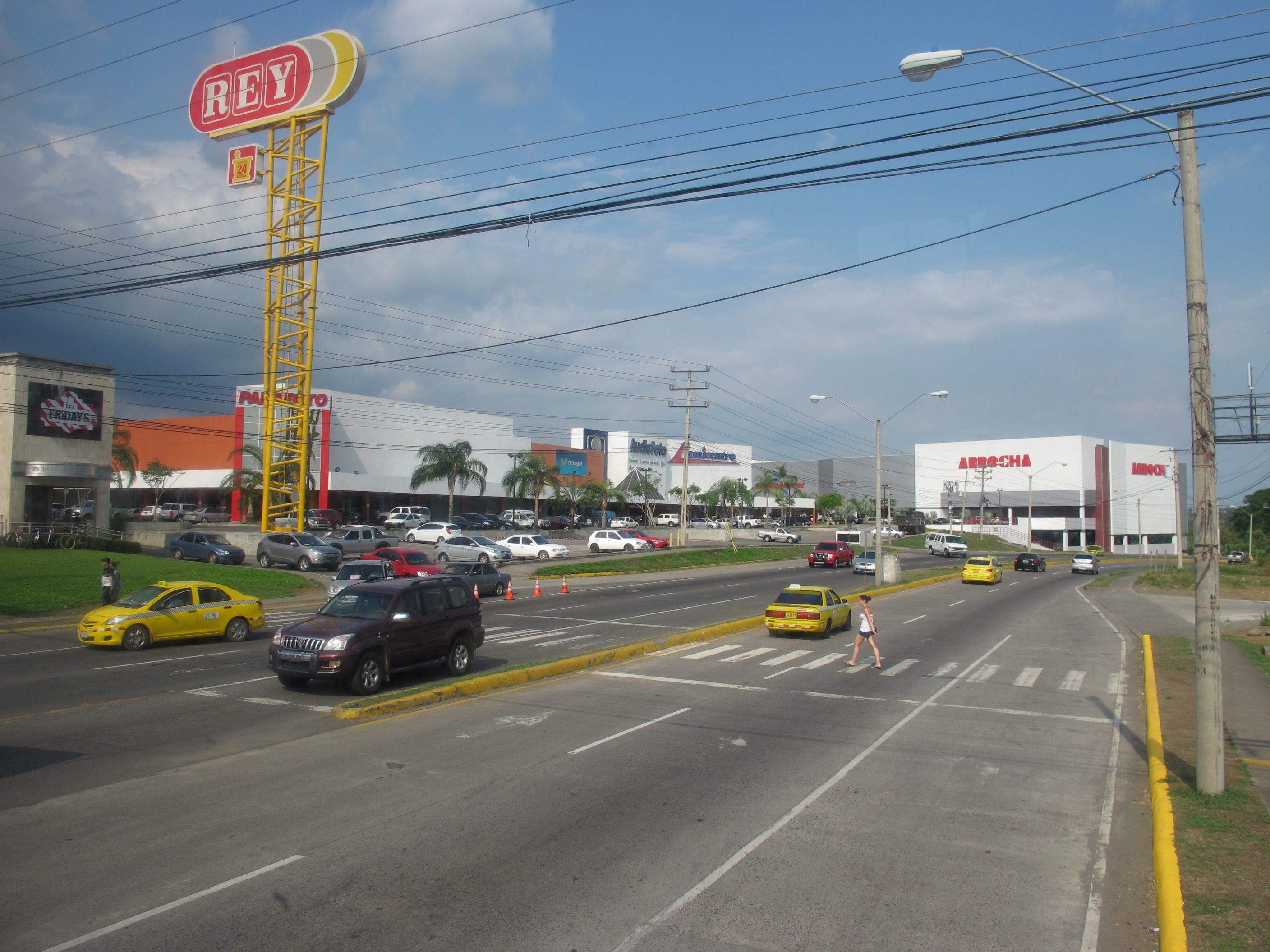
Supermarket Rey and Pan-American Highway in David, Panama

- PriceSmart

=== United States ===
Stores in the United States tend to be single-level enterprises with long operating hours; many of them, especially Walmart, are open 24 hours a day (except on certain holidays). The term "hypermarket" is not in general use in the US. Warehouse stores such as Costco and Sam's Club are popular alternatives to discount superstores (hypermarkets) for much the same shopping requirements, requiring an annual membership, purchase of larger sizes of packaged groceries, and a more limited selection of brands and styles.

- Fred Meyer – now a division of Kroger
- Kroger Marketplace
- Meijer
- Smith's Marketplace – nameplate for hypermarkets operated by another Kroger division, Smith's Food & Drug; in a 2004 corporate reorganization, Smith's took over the Utah operations of Fred Meyer
- SuperTarget
- Walmart Supercenter

Defunct

- American Fare – division of Kmart/Bruno's
- Auchan – tested in the Houston and Chicago areas; Houston stores closed in 2003
- bigg's – merged with Remke Markets and lost general merchandise section (see Remke Markets bigg's)
- Carrefour – opened hypermarkets in Philadelphia and Voorhees Township, New Jersey, in 1988 and 1992 respectively; both closed in 1993. Some associates wore roller skates to facilitate moving about the large building. The Voorhees location now houses a Kohl's department store, a Raymour & Flanigan furniture store, and a Marshall's discount clothing store. The Philadelphia location (an outparcel of the Philadelphia Mills mall) housed a Walmart discount store (formerly a Bradlees; moved to a Supercenter on the former Ports Of The World/Boscov's/Steve & Barry's site) and still houses Dick's Sporting Goods and Raymour & Flanigan.
- Fedco – membership department store chain, operated in Southern California from 1948 to 1999
- Gemco – division of Lucky Stores
- Harts Stores / Big Bear Plus – division of Big Bear Stores
- Hypermart USA – division of Wal-Mart
- Kmart Super Center – last location closed in April 2018 in Warren, Ohio
- Leedmark – a joint venture involving E.Leclerc of France; operated a single 306,000-square-foot (28,400 m^{2}) store in Glen Burnie, Maryland from 1991 to 1994
- The Real Superstore – a division of the defunct National Tea Company, the former US subsidiary of the Canadian Loblaws chain, which runs The Real Canadian Superstore (see listings for Canada in the Canadian section)
- The Treasury
- Twin Valu – division of ShopKo/SuperValu

== Oceania ==
=== Australia ===
The hypermarket concept was not a success in Australia. Coles Myer had their own hypermarkets in the country with the introduction of Super Kmart in 1983, until the results were not positive. The concept was eventually shelved by 1989 to then divide all Super Kmart stores to have a separate Coles supermarket and a separate Kmart discount department store.

In 1984 the South African retail chain Pick 'n Pay opened a hypermarket in the Brisbane suburb of Aspley. They had planned to expand to 10 hypermarkets however union bans imposed on South Africa by Australia at the time because of Apartheid prevented the other stores from opening. In 1995 the Australian branch of Pick 'n Pay was sold to Coles Myer and in late 2012 the Pick 'n Pay Hypermarket in Aspley would be closed and divided into an Aldi and Coles supermarkets as well as a Kmart discount department store.

Costco has stores in Brisbane, Newcastle, Sydney, Canberra, Melbourne, Adelaide and Perth.

Defunct

- Pick 'n Pay Hypermarket
- Super Kmart

=== New Zealand ===
In New Zealand, The Warehouse operated three hypermarkets in the North Island between 2006 and 2009 under the "Extra" banner. These stores were closed due to poor performance.

Defunct

The Warehouse Extra

== South America ==
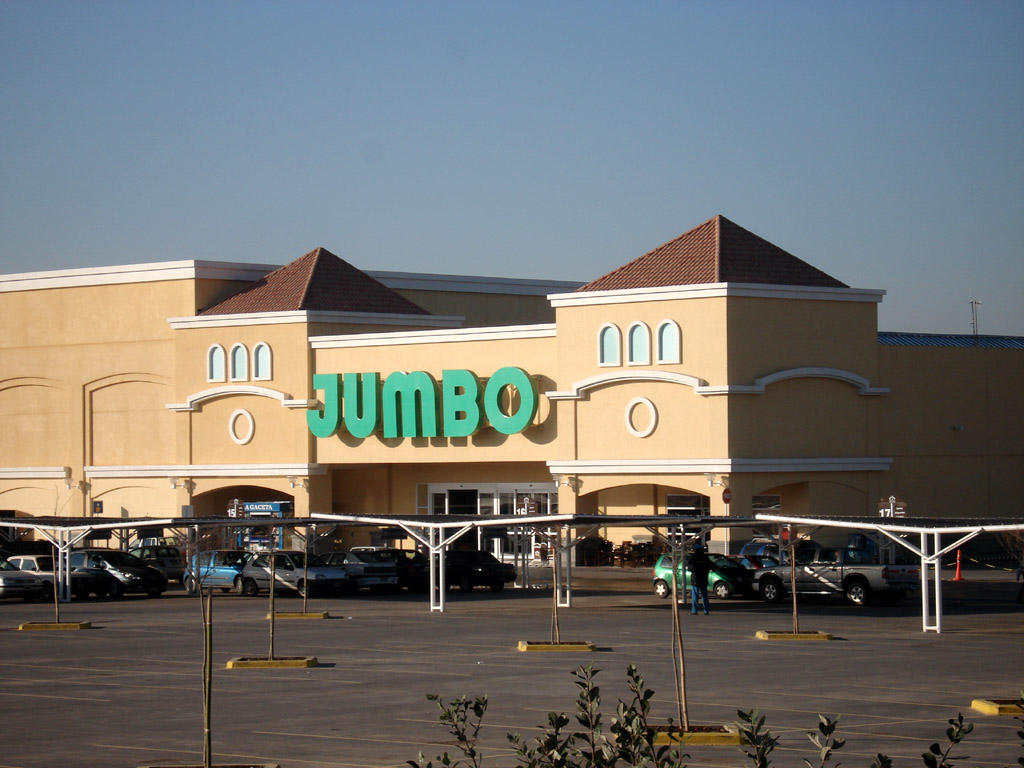
A Jumbo in Tucumán, Argentina

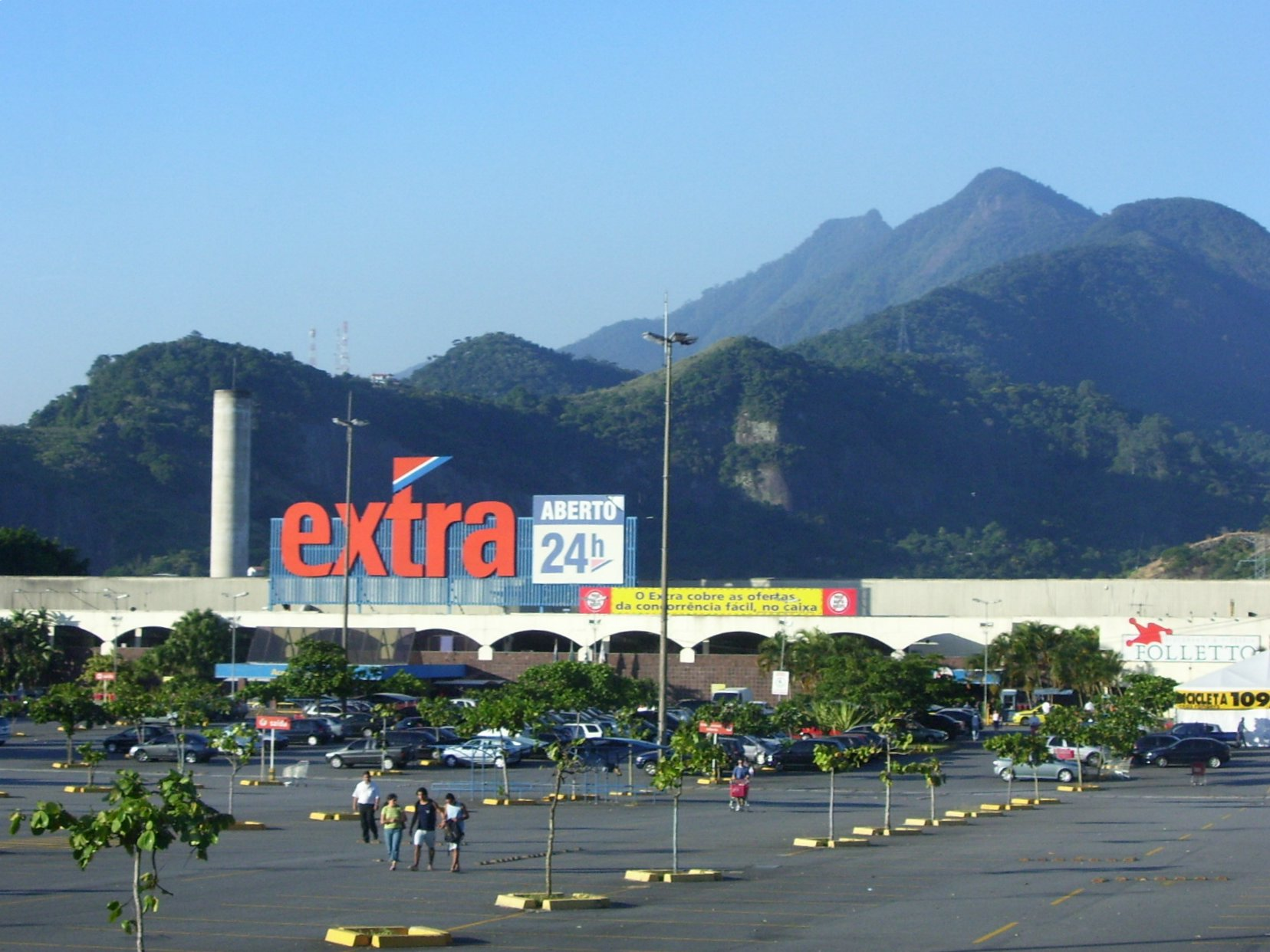
Extra Hipermercados in Brazil

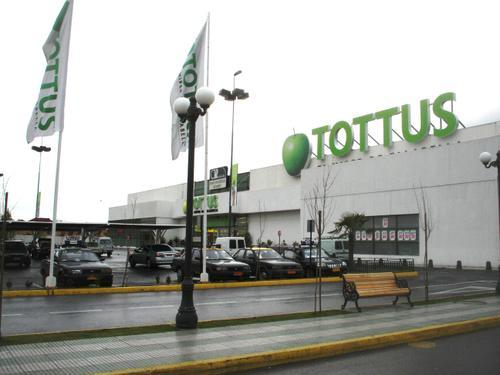
Tottus in Puente Alto, Chile

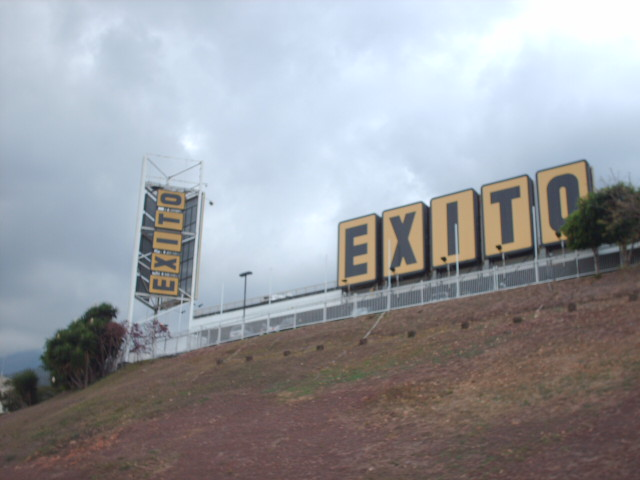
Grupo Éxito in Colombia and Venezuela

=== Argentina ===
- Carrefour
- Coto
- Dia
- Hipermercados Jumbo
- Walmart

=== Bolivia ===
- Hipermaxi
- Fidalga
- IC Norte

=== Brazil ===
- Carrefour
- Pão de açúcar
- CompreBem
- Extra Hipermercados

Defunct

- Bompreço
- Sendas
- Wal-Mart

=== Chile ===
- Jumbo
- Líder
- Tottus

=== Colombia ===
- Éxito
- Jumbo

Defunct

- Carrefour – rebranded Jumbo in 2012

=== French Guiana ===
- Carrefour
- Géant Casino

=== Paraguay ===
- Extra Hipermercados

=== Peru ===
- Plaza Vea (Intercorp)
- Tottus (Falabella)
- Vivanda (Intercorp)
- Wong (Metro)

=== Uruguay ===
- Géant

=== Venezuela ===
- Éxito

== See also ==
- Big-box store
- List of superstores
- List of supermarket chains
