= Servay Hypermarket =

Malaysian retail chain

Servay Hypermarket Servay and Parkwell
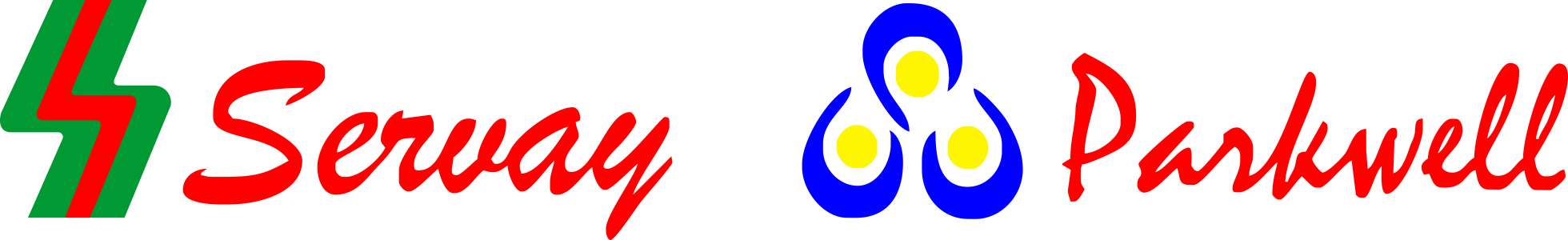
- Type: Private Limited Company
- Industry: Retail: Department store, grocery stores, and hypermarkets
- Founded: 1990; 36 years ago in Miri, Malaysia
- Founder: Dato Sri Lai Kock Poh (founder); Datin Sri Yong Mee Yam (executive director); P’ng Ngee Yew (director)
- Headquarters: Miri, Sarawak, Malaysia
- Number of locations: 24 stores (2018)
- Owner: Evergreen Trading Sdn Bhd
- Website: www.servay.com.my Servay Parkwell on Facebook

Servay Hypermarket (S) Sdn. Bhd. (doing business as Servay and Parkwell) is a hypermarket and retailer chain in Malaysia. It is one of the main existing retailer in East Malaysia, having over 30 branches (supermarket, hypermarket & convenient store) spread throughout Sabah and Sarawak. It was founded by Dato Sri Lai Kock Poh in 1990.

== History ==
The company history dated back to the year 1979 when Evergreen Trading was set up. The first Servay Supermarket was established in 1990 in Miri, Sarawak. Since then, more outlets were established to meet the increase demands from the public. The company expand their supermarket and hypermarket chain to Sabah in 1997. At the moment, Servay have more outlets in Sabah than any other places.

== Chains ==
View of the Servay Jaya Kota Marudu.

=== Servay Hypermarket, Supermarket & Jaya. ===
Here are the list of branches in both Sabah and Sarawak:

- Supermarket and Departmental Stores (Miri, Sarawak) (1990)
- Parkwell Departmental Stores (Miri, Sarawak) (1994)
- Servay Hypermarket (Penampang, Kota Kinabalu, Sabah) (opened in 1997; burned down in 2008 and re-opened in 2010)
- Servay Supermarket (Sandakan, Sabah) (1999)
- Parkwell Departmental Stores (Sandakan, Sabah) (2000)
- Servay Hypermarket (Tawau, Sabah) and Servay Hypermarket (KK Plaza, Sabah) (2001)
- Servay Hypermarket (Likas, Kota Kinabalu) and Servay Hypermarket (Miri Plaza, Miri) (2003)
- Servay Hypermarket (Sandakan, Sabah) (burned down in 2014) and Servay Jaya Superstore (Taman Tunku, Miri, Sarawak) (2005)
- Servay Jaya Superstore (Keningau, Sabah) (2007)
- Servay Hypermarket (Putatan, Sabah) (2008)
- Servay Jaya Superstore (Tawau, Sabah) (2009)
- Servay Hypermarket (Lahad Datu, Sabah) (2011)
- Servay Hypermarket (Kota Samarahan, Sarawak) (2013–2021)
- Servay Hypermarket (King Centre, Kuching, Sarawak) (2014–2019)
- Servay Jaya (Kota Marudu, Sabah) (2015)
- Servay Jaya (Beaufort, Sabah) and Servay Hypermarket (Inanam, Sabah) (2016)
- Servay Jaya (Kota Samarahan, Sarawak), Servay Premier (Centre Point (pusat beli-belah), Kota Kinabalu, Sabah), Servay Jaya (Benoni, Sabah), Servay Jaya (Kinabatangan, Sabah), Servay Jaya (Sipitang, Sabah) (2018)
- Servay Jaya (Sejati Walk, Sandakan, Sabah) (March 2019)
- Servay Hypermarket (Papar, Sabah) (June 2019)
- Servay Jaya Supermarket (Kudat, Sabah) (October 2019)
- Servay Jaya Sungai Tajong (Tawau, Sabah) (April 2020)
- Servay Jaya Kunak (Kunak, Sabah) (July 2020 )
- Servay Hypermarket Permy Mall (Miri, Sarawak) (April 2021)
- Servay Jaya Supermarket Senadin (Senadin, Sarawak) (October 2021)
- Servay Jaya Supermarket Lahad Datu (Lahad Datu, Sabah) (December 2021)
- Servay Jaya Supermarket 1Borneo (1Borneo Hypermall, Sabah) (July 2022)
- Servay Jaya Supermarket Ketiau (Putatan, Sabah) (December 2022)
- Servay Jaya Supermarket Semporna (Semporna, Sabah) (December 2022)
- Servay Hypermarket Beaufort (Beaufort, Sabah) (January 2024)
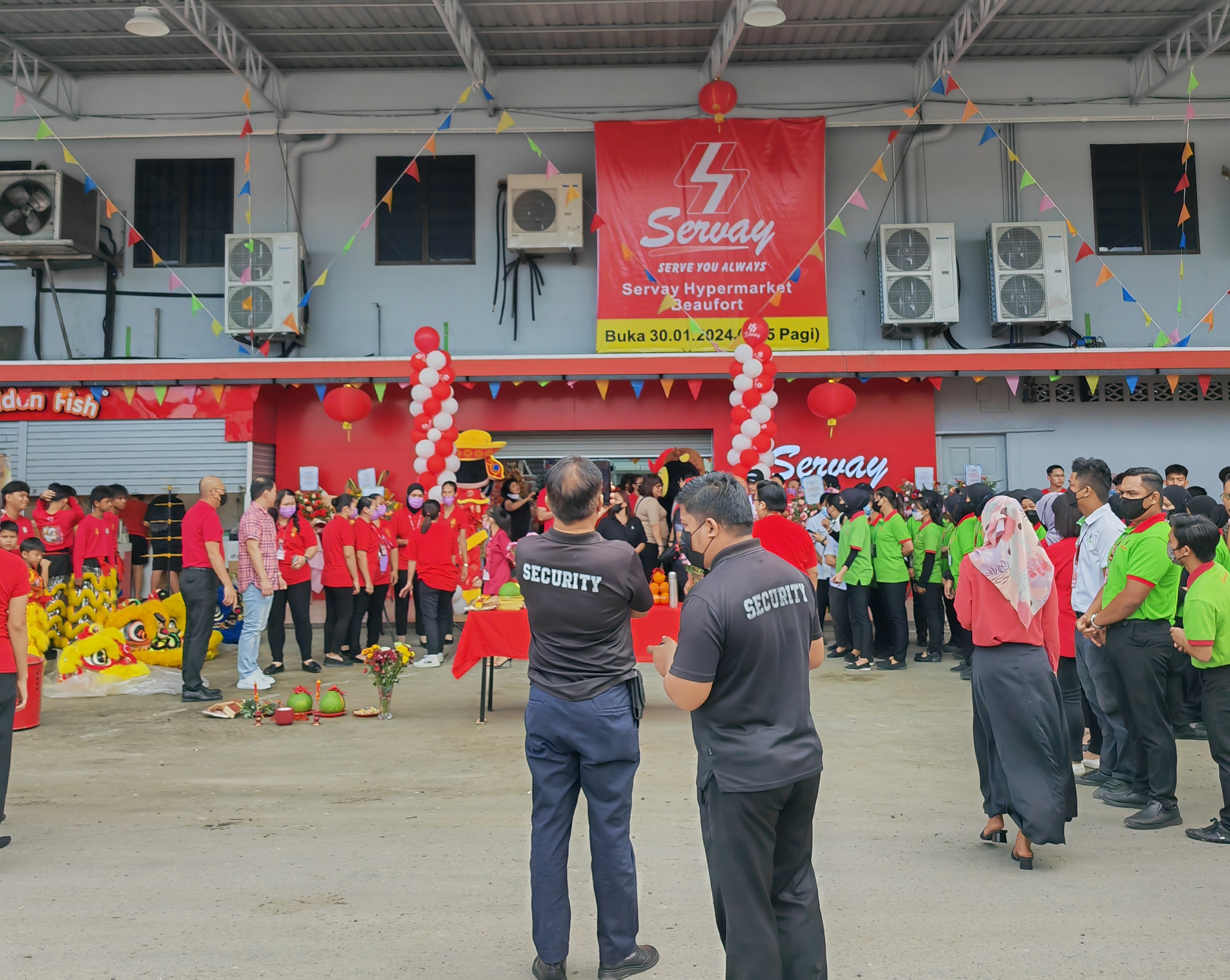
  Servay Hypermarket Beaufort Sabah Opening Ceremony
- Servay Jaya Supermarket Tulid (Keningau, Sabah) (September 2024)
- Servay Jaya Supermarket Batu 27 (Keningau, Sabah) (October 2024)

=== Servay Express & Servay Mart ===
In 2018, Servay group have expanded their businesses from a full scale Hypermarket & supermarket to convenient stores. These stores are known as Servay Express & Servay Mart. Although Servay Express & Servay Mart shares the same concept of operating as convenient store, the difference between these two are their location. Whereby Servay Express operated in East Malaysia, while Servay Mart operated in West Malaysia. However, as of 2023, Servay Mart is no longer in operation.

- Servay Express
  - Servay Express Kimanis (March 2018)
  - Servay Express Lumat (September 2018)
  - Servay Express Rugading (October 2018)
  - Servay Express Tuaran (November 2018)
  - Servay Express Beaufort (December 2018)
  - Servay Express Kivatu (February 2019)
  - Servay Express Kinarut (April 2019)
  - Servay Express One Place Mall Putatan (May 2019)
  - Servay Express Taman Fulliwa Menggatal (June 2019)
  - Servay Express Langkon (December 2019)
  - Servay Express Tanjung Aru (September 2020)
  - Servay Express Karamunsing (November 2020)
  - Servay Express Kepayan Point (January 2021)
  - Servay Express Lok Kawi (May 2021)
  - Servay Express Api-Api (June 2021)
  - Servay Express Ketiau (December 2021 - June 2024)
  - Servay Express Mengkabong (December 2021)
  - Servay Express Sulaman (December 2021)
  - Servay Express Apin-Apin (January 2022)
  - Servay Express Tambalang (March 2022)
  - Servay Express Sikuati (October 2022)
  - Servay Express Kuala Penyu (December 2022)
  - Servay Express Kampung Laut Kinarut (February 2023)
  - Servay Express KingFisher (June 2024)
  - Servay Express Serusup (July 2024)
  - Servay Express Mahali Papar (July 2024)
  - Servay Express Limauan Kinarut (August 2024)

- Servay Mart
  - Servay Mart Sri Cemerlang
  - Servay Mart Jalan Hospital
  - Servay Mart Wakaf Bharu
  - Servay Mart Wakaf Che Yeh
  - Servay Mart Kg. Kebakat
  - Servay Mart Pengkalan Chepa
  - Servay Mart Kg. Sireh
  - Servay Mart Pasir Puteh

=== Servay Online. ===
Since the third quarter of 2019, Servay had expanded their business with the introduction of Servay online. At the moment, the service is only provided to customers in East Malaysia.

== Controversies ==
In November 2025, Servay Hypermarket (Sabah) Sdn. Bhd. was fined RM30,000 by a Sessions Court in Miri for failing to provide a safe working system under the Occupational Safety and Health Act 1994.

== See also ==
- List of hypermarkets in Malaysia
