= Tazweed Center =

Jordanian supermarket chain

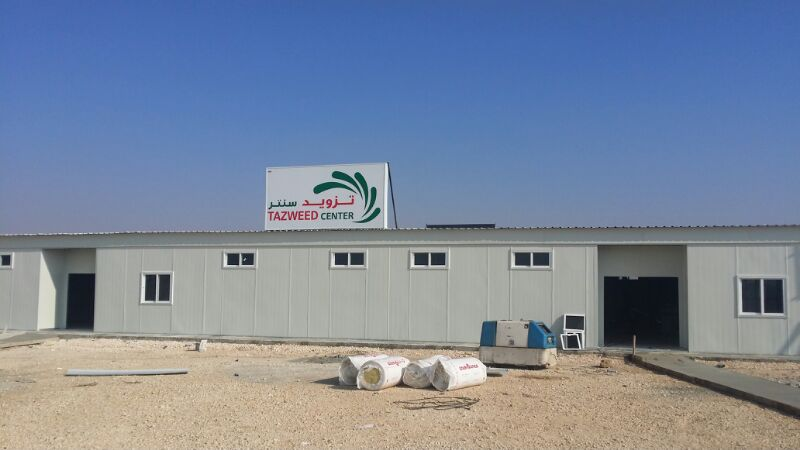
Tazweed supermarket storefront in 2014

Tazweed Center is a supermarket chain operating in the Syrian refugee camps in Jordan. The stores were founded by the United Nations World Food Programme who partnered with local company Tazweed through a PPP model in order to bring a ‘sense of normalcy’ to Syrian refugees' lives. Opened in January 2014 on the main road of Zaatari Camp, it is one of two chains –along with Safeway– serving over 100,000 Syrian refugees, with Syrians comprising 93 percent of staff. The word "tazweed" translates to "supply."
