= Liniya =

Hypermarket chain

Liniya Hypermarket, LLC
- Company type: LLC
- Industry: Hypermarket chain
- Founded: December 6, 2002; 22 years ago in Kursk, Kursk Oblast, Russia
- Founder: Grinn Corporation, JSC; Olga Greshilova
- Headquarters: Kursk, Russia
- Areas served: 10 oblasts of Russia
- Owner: Grinn Corporation, JSC
- Website: www.grinn-corp.ru/chain-stores-line/

Liniya is a cash and carry type hypermarket chain that Grinn Corporation owns. As of 2007, according to the Kommersant newspaper, it ranked 21st among Russia's Top 50 Biggest Store/Cash & Carry Chains.

== History ==
On December 6, 2002, the chain's first store opened in Kursk. This chain currently owns 27 stores (excluding stores in MegaGrinn shopping mall centers) in 10 Russian oblasts.

In 2019, the media reported that allegedly 99.9% owned by JSC Corporation "Grinn" was pledged in favor of LLC "Strategy", which is managed by the relatives of one of the co-owners of the holding "Adamant". Nikolai Greshilov denied this information. Before this, information appeared that the Bryansk territory "Liniya" stores would be sold, as the company was allegedly preparing for bankruptcy.
