= Ardis (retailer) =

Algerian retailer

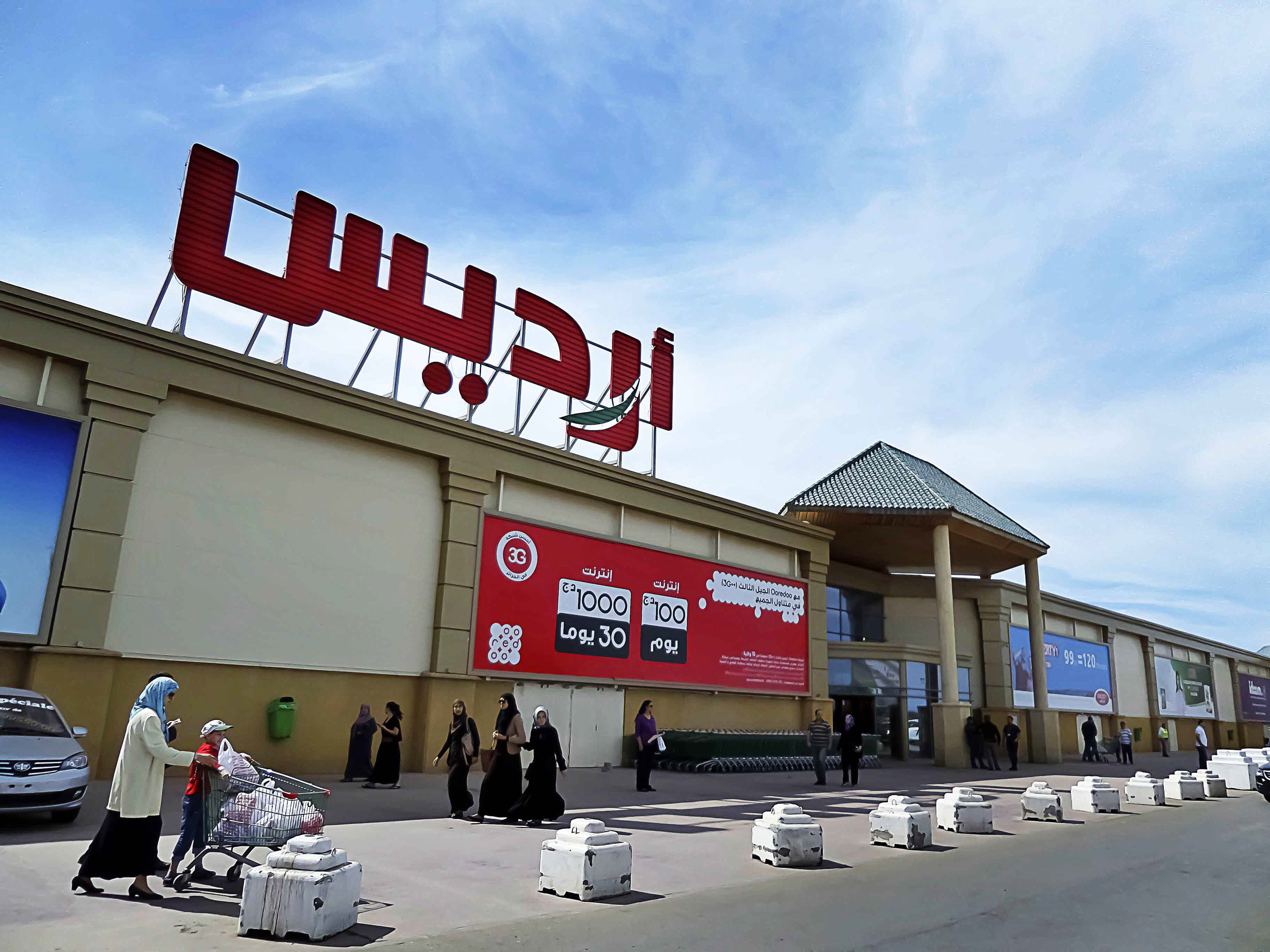
- Founded: 2012
- Headquarters: Algiers, Algeria
- Owner: Arcofina
- Website: www.ardis.dz

Ardis is a supermarket chain in Algiers, the capital city of Algeria. The first hypermarket was opened in 2012 in Mohammedia, the second was opened in Bir El Djir, Oran in 2016. It is owned by Arcofina Group.
