= Proma Hypermarket =

Iranian supermarket chain

Coordinates: 36°19′33″N 59°33′51″E

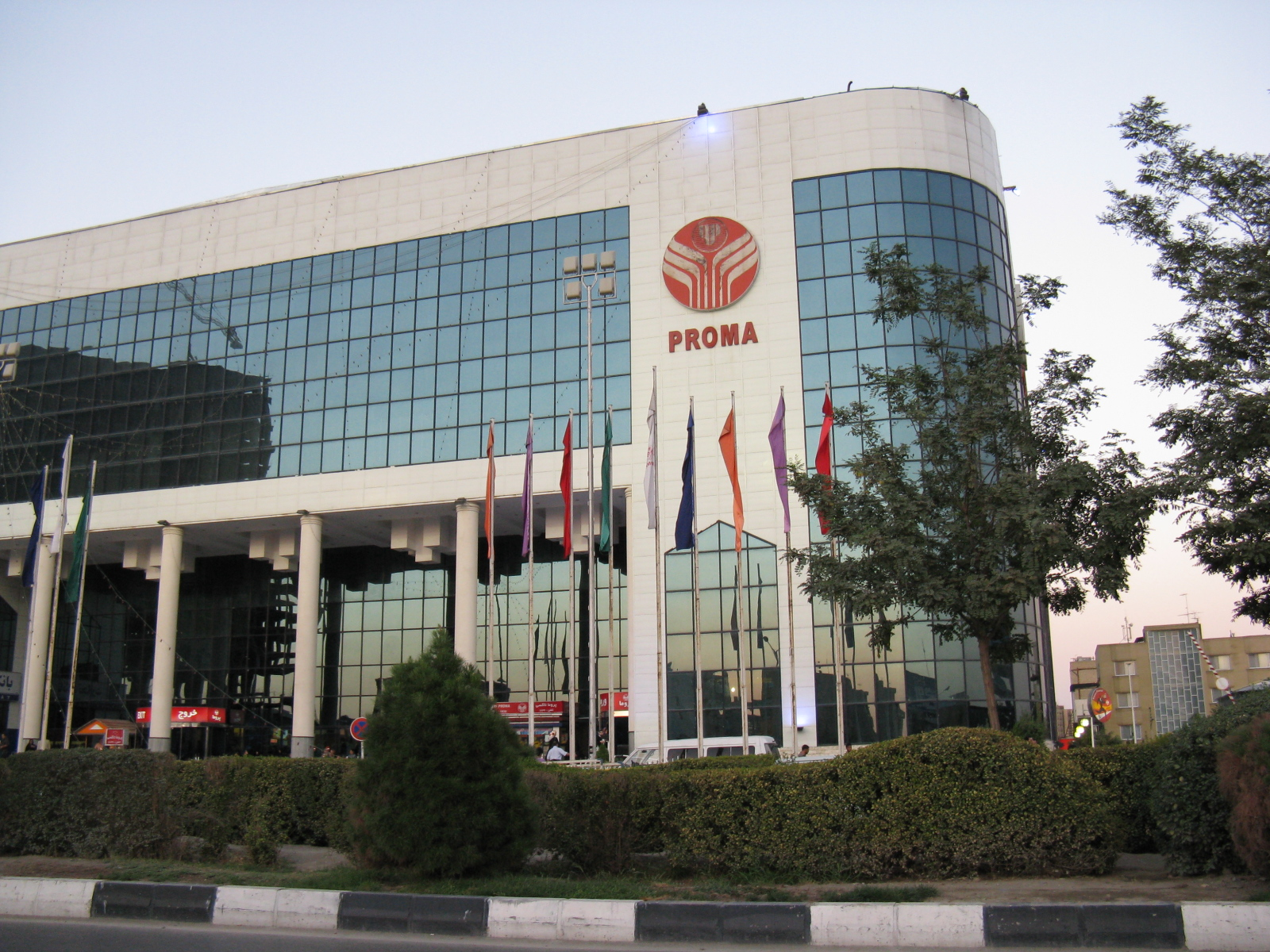
Proma from outside

Proma Hypermarket is an Iranian supermarket chain launched in three cities of Iran including Mashhad, Tehran, and Qazvin. Proma Hypermarket in Mashhad is a 420,000 m^{2} complex comprising a shopping mall located near Janbaz Square, Mashhad, Iran.
