= Padideh Shandiz =

Padideh Shandiz International Tourism Development Company
- Formerly: Kavoshgaran Saham Investment Company
- Company type: Private Joint-stock
- Industry: Restaurants, Tourism and Construction
- Founded: 6 February 2005 (20 years ago)
- Founder: Mohsen Pahlavan
- Headquarters: Mashhad, Iran
- Area served: Mashhad, Tehran, Kish Island, Shandiz
- Total assets: 200,000,000,000,000 Rials ($6.3b USD)
- Number of employees: 30,000 (2015)
- Website: http://www.padide.com

Padideh Shandiz International Tourism Development Company (known as Padideh Shandiz، پدیده شاندیز) is an Iranian private joint-stock holding company active in restaurants, tourism and construction.

== Controversy ==
The company behaves like a public company by selling stocks despite being a joint-stock. Its share price jumped from 2,000 to 100,000 Rials from 2009 to 2014. In January 2015, a prosecutor in Mashhad accused the company of a "fraud" worth $34.3 billion. Although the allegation was denied by the company's chairman, it resulted to a 20% share price value drop. The company is currently controversially under investigation by Iranian Judiciary. The company is allegedly manipulating the shares.

== Advertisements ==
Padideh uses massive Advertisement on its projects, and is reported to have a ⅓ share in Iranian airports advertisements, as well as paying 5.1% of IRIB income from advertisements.

== Padideh Khorasan Football Club ==
In July 2013 Padideh Shandiz company bought Azadegan League club Mes Sarcheshmeh and renamed it as Padideh Khorasan Football Club.
