= List of supermarket chains in Asia =

This is a list of supermarket chains in Asia.

== Afghanistan ==
- Chelsea Supermarket
- Spinneys

== Bangladesh ==
- Agora Super Stores
- Almas
- Amana Big Bazar
- Meena Bazar
- PRAN-RFL Group
  - Daily Shopping
- Prince Bazar
- Shwapno
- Unimart

== Cambodia ==
- Big C
- Makro
- AEON

== China ==
=== Hong Kong ===
- 7-Eleven
- ÆON (Formerly JUSCO, also considered a department store)
- c!ty'super
- Subsidiaries of China Resources, including:
  - CR Vanguard (Defunct)
  - U Select
- DCH Food Mart (Defunct)
- Marks & Spencer
- Seibu Department Stores (Defunct)
- Yata (also considered a department store)
- Sogo (also considered a department store)
- UNY/APiTA
- Subsidiaries of AS Watson, including:
  - PARKnSHOP
  - Fusion
  - Taste
  - International by PARKnSHOP
  - Gourmet
  - Great
  - Food le Parc
- Subsidiaries of DFI Retail Group, including:
  - Wellcome
  - Market Place/Market Place by Jasons
  - 3hreeSixty
  - Oliver's The Delicatessen
- Kai Bo
- DS Groceries

=== Macau ===
- San Miu
- Royal
- Seng Cheong
- Sunsco
- Novo Yaohan (also considered a department store)

== India ==
- 7-Eleven - Just in Metro Cities
- Central Bazaar - National Player
- DMart - National Player
- HyperCity - Just in Metro cities
- Kurinji Metro Bazaar - Regional Player
- Lulu Hypermarket - Just in Metro Cities
- Maveli Stores - Regional Player
- More - Regional Player
- Namdhari's Fresh - Regional Player
- Nesto - Regional Player
- Nilgiri's - Regional Player
- Reliance Fresh - National Player
- Smart Bazaar - National Player
- Spar - In Metro cities
- Spencer's Retail - Regional Player
- Triveni Supermarkets - Regional Player
- Valuezone Hypermarket - Regional Player
- Walmart - Just in Metro Cities
- Supplyco - Regional Player

== Iran ==
- Hyper Star
- Proma Hypermarket
- Refah Chain Stores Co.
- Shahrvand Chain Stores Inc.
- Svetofor

== Iraq ==
- Carrefour

== Israel ==
- Carrefour
- Hatzi Hinam
- Rami Levy
- Shufersal
- Tiv Ta'am

== Japan ==
Convenience Store:

- 7-Eleven
- FamilyMart

Supermarket:

- ÆON
- Albis
- Belc (ja)
- Costco
- Don Quijote - discount store
- Ito-Yokado
- Izumiya
- Kanesue
- Kansai Super
- Life Supermarket (ja)
- Maxvalu Tokai
- Seijo Ishii (ja)
- Seiyu
- Seiyu Group
- UNY Apita, Biago
- Yaokō, Kanto region, mainly Saitama Prefecture and Chiba Prefecture.

== Jordan ==
- CTown Supermarkets
- HyperMax
- Cozmo
- Spinneys
- Tazweed Center

== Kazakhstan ==
- Magnum
- SMall
- METRO
- Ataba
- Ramstore
- Arzan
- Ayan
- Yuzhnyi

== Kuwait ==
- HyperMax
- Lulu Hypermarket
- Lulu Supermarket
- The Sultan Center
- City Hypermarket
- Grand Hyper
- Nesto
- Monoprix

== Laos ==
- Big C
- Kokkok Mart
- 7-Eleven
- Rimping

== Lebanon ==
- Carrefour
- Faddoul
- Happy
- Khoury Shopping Centre (KSC)
- La Valeur
- Monoprix
- Promarché
- Spinneys
- The Sultan Center
- noknok

== Mongolia ==
- KHANBURGEDEI Supermarket
- Emart
- Nomin
- Minii

== Nepal ==
- Bhatebhateni Supermarket
- Big Mart

== Oman ==
- HyperMax
- LuLu Hypermarket
- Nesto
- Spar

== Pakistan ==
- Al-Fatah
- Carrefour
- Chase Up
- CSD Pakistan
- Imtiaz
- Kifayah Supermarket
- Metro Pakistan
- Naheed
- Spar

== Qatar ==
- Carrefour
- Carrefour Market
- Lulu Supermarket
- Lulu Hypermarket
- Mega Mart Supermarket
- Spinneys

== Saudi Arabia ==
- Panda
- Carrefour
- HyperPanda
- Abdullah Al-Othaim Markets
- Tamimi
- Danube
- Al-Sadhan Supermarket
- Lulu Hypermarket
- Lulu Supermarket
- Nesto Hypermarket
- BinDawood
- Farm Superstores
- Sarawat Hypermarket

== Singapore ==
- Cold Storage (Macrovalue)
- Giant (Macrovalue)
- NTUC Fairprice
- Prime Supermarket
- Sheng Siong
- Scarlett Supermarket

== South Korea ==
=== National chains ===
- Costco
- E-mart
- Lotte Mart
- Homeplus
- GS THE FRESH, Owner by GS Group
- NongHyup Hanaro Mart, Owner by NongHyup and Regional NongHyup

=== Regional chains ===
- MEGA MART, Owner by Nongshim
- JangbogoFoodMart, JangbogoFoodMart is a regional supermarket chain in Korea, focusing on Gyeongsang Province. Owner by JangbogoFoodMart Co, LTD.
- TopMart, TopMart is a regional supermarket chain in Korea, focusing on Gyeongsang Province. Owner by SEOWON DISTRIBUTION Co., Ltd.
- TRIAL, TRIAL is Japan Supermarket Chain Group. South Korea Store Owner by TRIAL Korea Co., Ltd.
- IGA
- Segyero Mart

== Sri Lanka ==
- Arpico Super Centre
- Cargills PLC (Food City)
- Keells (Jaykay Marketing Services)
- Laugfs Supermarkets
- Spar
- Glomark (Softlogic Holdings)
- Star United

== Syria ==
- Grand Mart

== Taiwan ==
- A.mart
- c!ty'super
- Carrefour
- Costco
- Jasons Market Place
- PXmart
- RT-Mart
- Wellcome

== Tajikistan ==
- Paykar
- Somon Supermarket
- Relax Supermarket

== Turkmenistan ==
- Ashgabat Hypermarket

== United Arab Emirates ==
- Auchan
- Carrefour
- Géant
- HyperPanda
- Lulu Hypermarket
- Nesto
- Spinneys
- Arwani Store
- Talal Market
- Viva

== Uzbekistan ==
- Auchan
- Kipa
- Makro Supermarket
- SPAR

== Vietnam ==
- ÆON
- Big C
- Lotte Mart
- VinMart

== Yemen ==
- LuLu Hypermarket
