= List of supermarket chains in Israel =

This is a list of supermarket chains in Israel.

== List ==
Name	Native name	Founded	Branches in Israel
AM:PM			48
Bar Kol	בר כל	1991	46 (2019)
Fresh Market: Hyper Dudu	פרש מרקט: היפר דודו		31 (2019)
Hatzi Hinam	חצי חינם	1990	7
Keshet Te'amim	קשת טעמים	2002	14 (2019)
Mahsanei HaShuk	מחסני השוק	1996	25 (2019)
Osher Ad	אושר עד	2009	16 (2019)
Rami Levy Hashikma Marketing: Super Cofix	רמי לוי שיווק השקמה: סופר קופיקס	1976; 2015	45 (August 2018) 28 (January 2019)
Shufersal	שופרסל	1958	272 (2019)
Super Yuda	סופר יודה		
Tiv Ta'am: Eden Teva Market	טיב טעם: עדן טבע מרקט	1990	45 (2019)
Victory	ויקטורי	1986	46 (2019)
Yeinot Bitan: Carrefour; Mega	יינות ביתן: קרפור; מגה	1995; 1932	185 (2019)
Yohananoff	יוחננוף	1992	21 (2019)

== See also ==
- Economy of Israel
- List of companies of Israel
