= Machsanei HaShuk =

Israeli supermarket chain

Machsanei HaShuk מחסני השוק
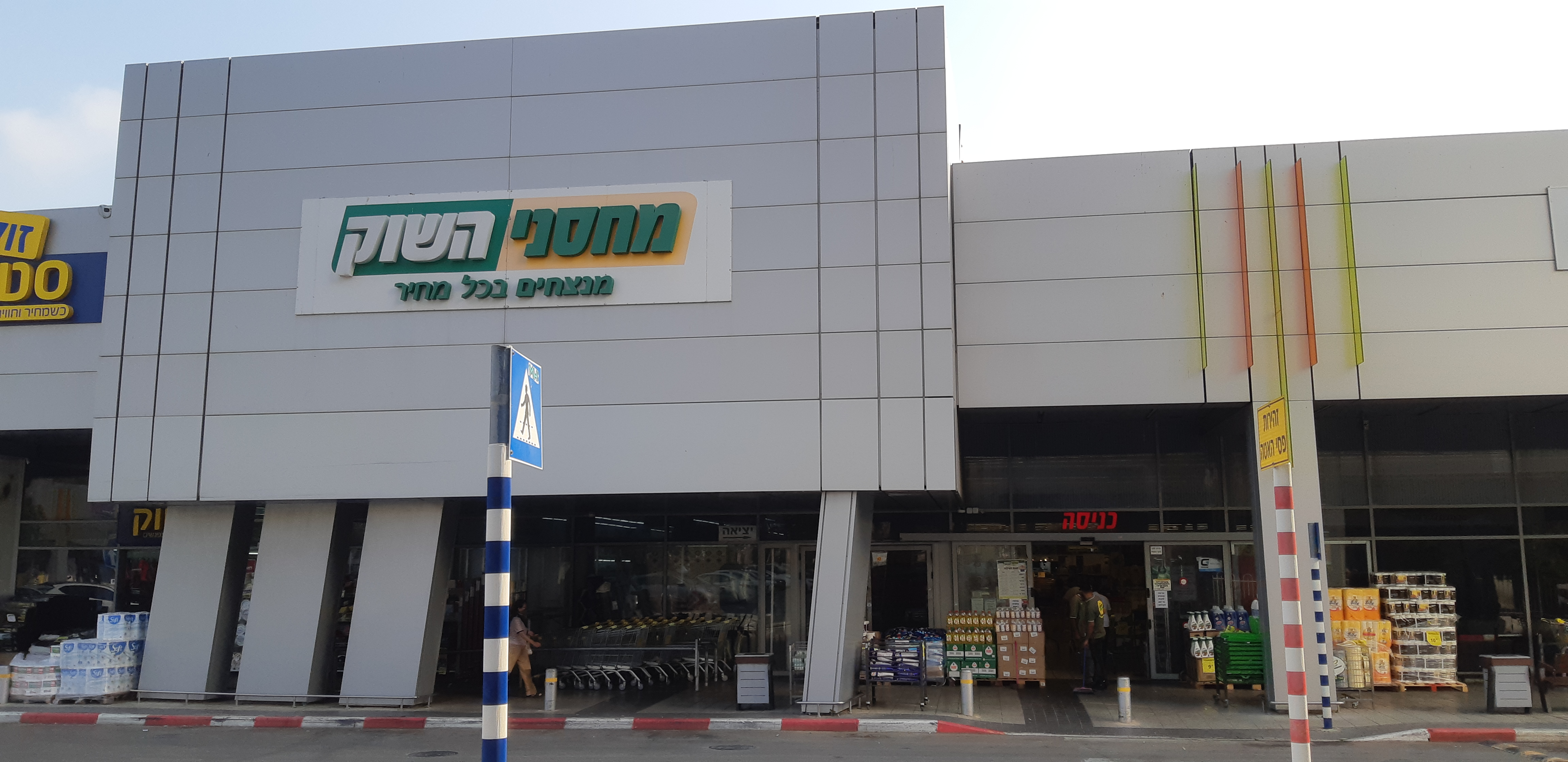
- Type: Supermarket
- Founded: 1996
- Headquarters: Beersheba
- Number of employees: 2000
- Website: m-shuk.net

Machsanei HaShuk (Hebrew: מחסני השוק) is a private supermarket chain in Israel that was established in 1996 in Beersheba. Its main offices are located in the city.

As of May 2023, it is one of the largest retail companies in Israel, with 63 supermarkets. According to the Dun's 100 ranking for the year 2023, it is the seventh largest chain in Israel, after Shufersal, Rami Levy Hashikma Marketing, Victory, Yohannoff, Hatzi Hinam and Osher Ad.

The company operates 28 branches under the brand "Machsanei HaShuk" and another 29 branches under the brand "Machsanei HaShuk For You" (formerly "Coopshop").

The network was the main sponsor of the Hapoel Beersheba football team.
