= Triveni =

Triveni may refer to:

- Triveni (poetry), a form of Hindi and Urdu poetry
- Triveni, Bajura, a municipality in Bajura District, Nepal
- Triveni Express, an express train located in India
- Triveni Supermarkets, a chain of retail supermarkets in Kerala, India
- A grove of trees sacred to Indian-origin religions: banyan, peepal, and neem

== People ==
- Triveni Acharya, Indian journalist and activist living in Mumbai
- Triveni Singh (1978–2004), Indian soldier from 5 Jammu and Kashmir Light Infantry
- Anasuya Shankar (1928–1963), a Kannada novelist known as Triveni

== See also ==
- Triveni Rural Municipality (disambiguation), rural municipalities of Nepal
- Thriveni, a Malayalam-language film
- Tribeni (disambiguation)
