= Triveni Rural Municipality =

Triveni Rural Municipality may refer to:

- Triveni Rural Municipality, Rolpa
- Triveni Rural Municipality, Salyan
- Triveni Rural Municipality, Western Rukum

== See also ==
- Sanni Triveni Rural Municipality
- Triveni (disambiguation)
- Tribeni (disambiguation)
