= Kanesue =

Japanese supermarket chain

Coordinates: 35°17′7.36″N 136°48′31.5″E

Kanesue Co., Ltd.
- Logo, 1982-present
- Native name: 株式会社カネスエ
- Type: Kabushiki kaisha
- Industry: Retail
- Founded: Honmachi, Ichinomiya, Aichi Prefecture, Japan (May 1, 1951)
- Headquarters: 1-5 Shimokawada-Cho; Ichinomiya, Aichi, Japan
- Area served: Aichi, Gifu and Mies, Japan
- Key people: Akira Ushida, CEO
- Products: Supermarket
- Revenue: JPY 29,200,000,000
- Number of employees: 2,212
- Website: kanesue.co.jp

Kanesue Co., Ltd. (株式会社カネスエ, Kabushiki-gaisha Kanesue) is a company that operates a chain of supermarkets in Japan. The company operates in Aichi, Mie, and Gifu. The company is headquartered in Ichinomiya, Aichi, and is a member of the CGC Japan.

== History ==
=== Early history ===
Kanesue's Logo (1902-1982)

The History of Kanesue began in 1902, when it was founded as a privately owned Fishmonger Kanesue Iwabe Syohten (カネスエ岩部商店) by Suejiro Iwabe (岩部末次郎, Iwabe Suejirō). In 1940 there were more than 20 employees.

=== 1950s and 1960s ===
On May 1, 1951, supermarkets within Honmachi Ichinomiya, Aichi Prefecture came together to establish the Kanesue Iwabe Syohten Co., Ltd. (株式会社カネスエ岩部商店, Kabushiki Kaisha Kanesue Iwabe Syōten) and Katsura Ushida (牛田桂, Ushida Katsura) became CEO of the company. there were 11 employees and total sales of JPY 10 million.

In 1960, Cash registers and in May, 1962, Self service were introduced.

In 1967 the company became chain store, there were 2 stores with total sales of JPY 1.2 billion.

=== 1970s and 1980s ===
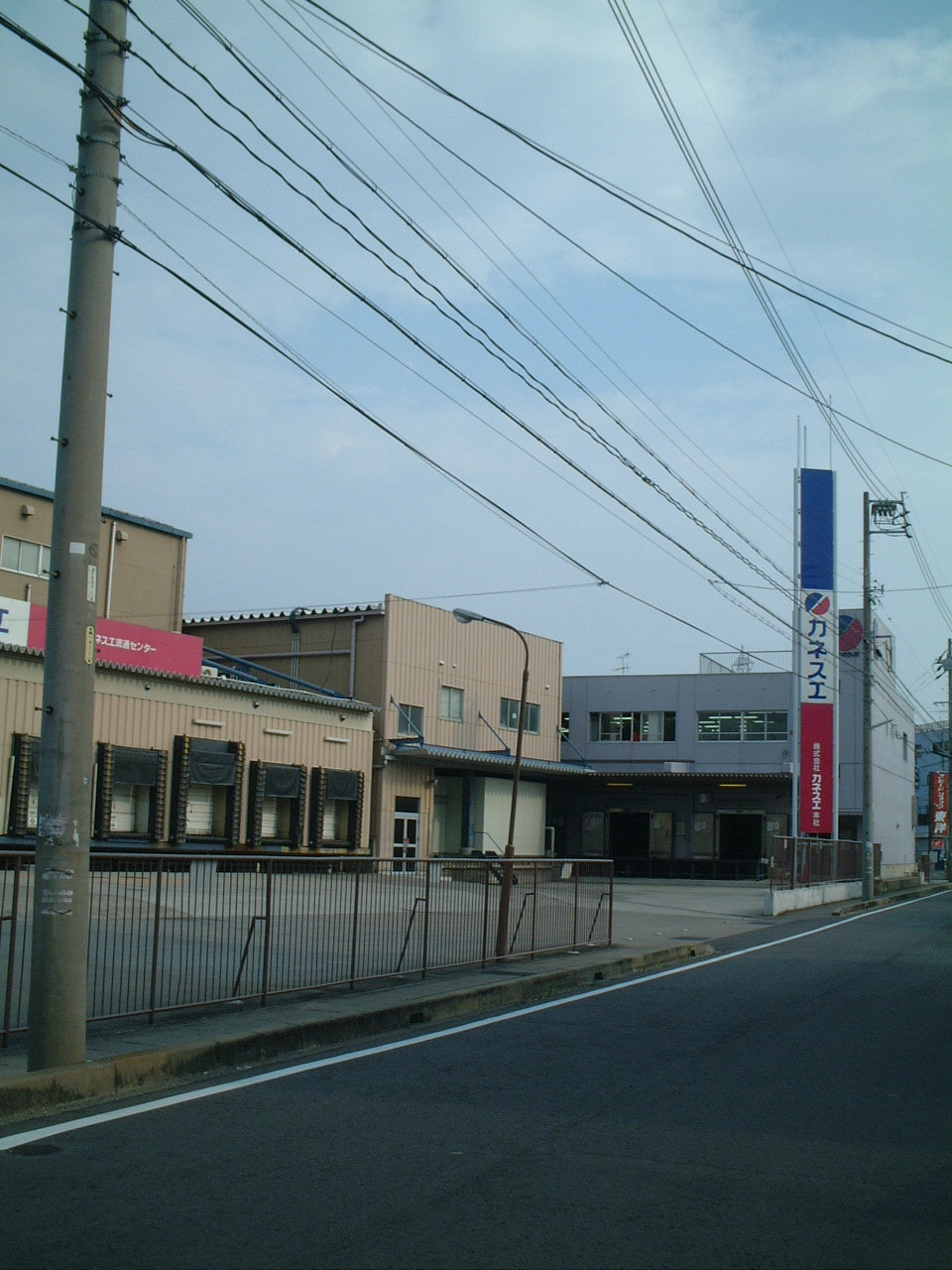
The headquarters of Kanesue

The company subsequently changed its name to Kanesue Co., Ltd. (株式会社カネスエ, Kabushiki Kaisha Kanesue) and moved its headquarters from 23-10-3 Honmachi, Ichinomiya, Aichi, to 1-5 Shimokawada-Cho Ichinomiya, Aichi, in July 1976, and this year there were 10 stores with total sales of JPY 6.6billion.

In 1982, there were 8 stores with total sales of over JPY 10 billion. the company introduced current Advertising slogan Oishiimono.Iimonodakewo (おいしもの、いいものだけを) and current Corporate identity.

=== 1990s-present ===
In 1992, the company opened its first stores outside of Aichi in Inabe District, Mie. it entered Ōno, Gifu in 1993, there were 17 stores with 1,300 employees and total sales of JPY 26.5 billion.

In October 2000, Akira Ushida (牛田彰, Ushida Akira) became CEO of the company. The company began to online retailer net super (ネットスーパー) Earth One (あーすワン) in 2000.

In March 2001, The company were 20 stores with 1,600 employees and total sales of JPY 28.0 billion. On September 9, 2003, first Natural food store Shunrakuzen (旬楽膳) opened in Aichi Prefecture.

On November 22, 2007, the company obtained certification ISO9001.

== Subsidiaries ==
Kanesue's operations primarily comprises three retailing subsidiaries: Kanesue (カネスエ), Earth One (あーすワン), and Shunrakuzen (旬楽膳) in Aichi, Mie and Gifu Prefecture.

=== Kanesue ===
Kanesue's (カネスエ) business model is based on selling a wide variety of food merchandise at "Oishiimono.Iimonodakewo (おいしもの、いいものだけを)."

The first Kanesue store opened in 1902 in Honmachi, Ichinomiya, Aichi Prefecture as of February 2008, there were 20 of them in Aichi(11), Mie(2) and Gifu(7) Prefecture. with typical size varying from 20,000 square feet (1,858.1 m^{2}) to 40,000 square feet (3,716.1 m^{2}).

=== Earth One ===
Earth one's logo

Earth One (あーすワン) is online retailer net super (ネットスーパー) this retail formats began in 2000.

Earth one's sales were JPY 500 million.

=== Shunrakuzen ===
Shunrakuzen (旬楽膳) is natural food store.

The first Shunrakuzen store opened on September 9, 2003, in Aichi Prefecture. As of March 1, 2008, there were 2 of them in Japan.

== Gallery ==
Kanesue store in Ichinomiya, Aichi Prefecture, Japan.	Kanesue store in Ichinomiya, Aichi Prefecture, Japan.	Kanesue store in Ichinomiya, Aichi Prefecture, Japan.	Kanesue store in Ichinomiya, Aichi Prefecture, Japan.
Kanesue store in Toin, Mie Prefecture, Japan.	Kanesue store in Gifu, Gifu Prefecture, Japan.	Kanesue store in Gifu, Gifu Prefecture, Japan.	Shunrakuzen store in Ichinomiya, Aichi Prefecture, Japan.

== See also ==
- List of supermarket chains in Asia
- List of Japanese companies
- CGC Japan

== References and notes ==
General reference

- Japanese book 『商い。百年 坊、魚食いたかないか？株式会社カネスエ 創業百年記念史』
