= Mizra =

Mizra: מִזְרָע (Hebrew)
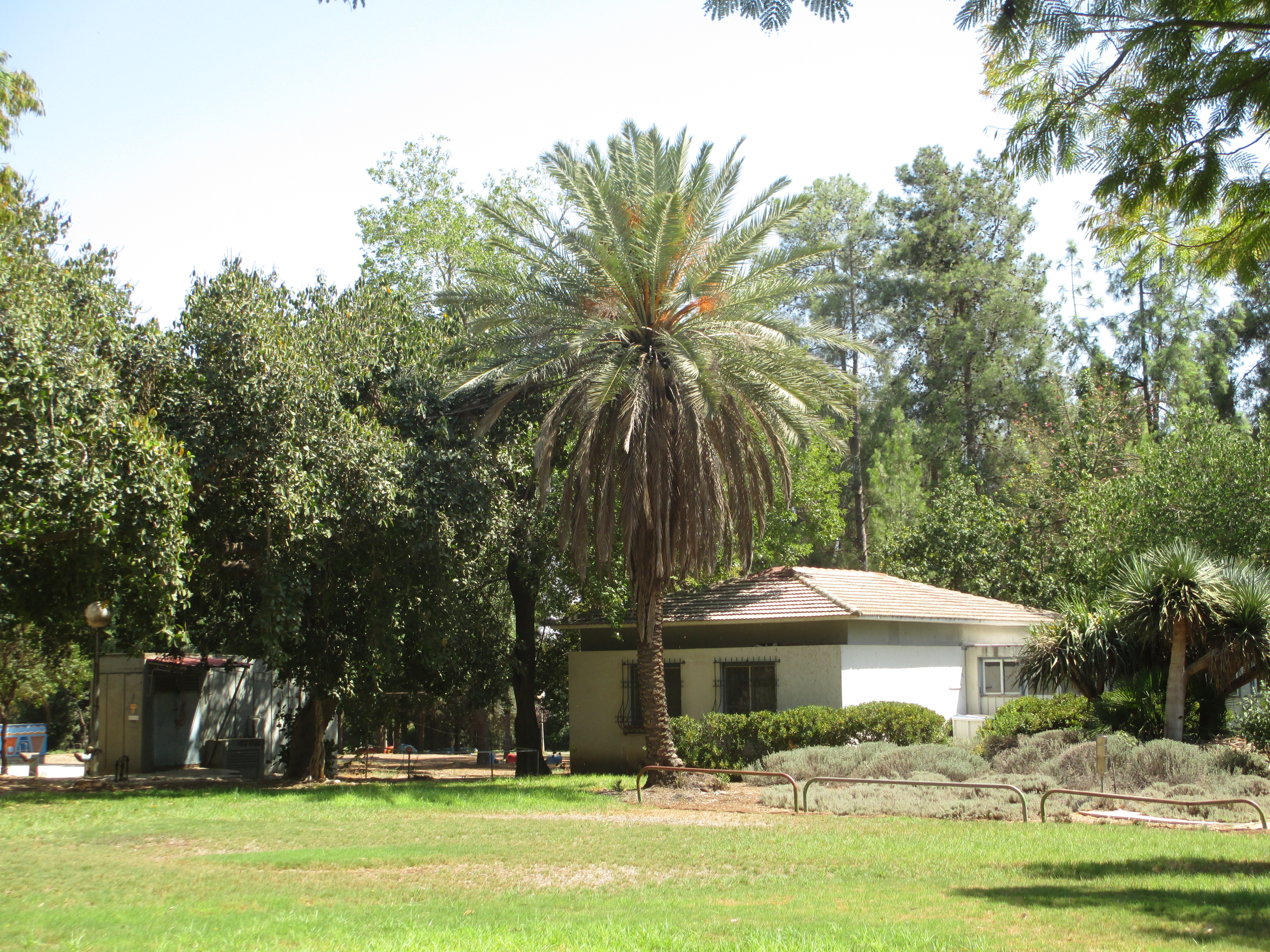

- Location within Jezreel Valley region of Israel Location within Israel
- Coordinates: 32°39′3″N 35°17′16″E
- Country: Israel
- District: Northern
- Subdistrict: Jezreel
- Council: Jezreel Valley
- Affiliation: Kibbutz Movement
- Founded: 1923
- Founder: European immigrants
- Population (2024): 1,042
- Website: www.mizra.org.il

Mizra (Hebrew: מִזְרָע, lit. 'Sowing') is a kibbutz in northern Israel. Located between Afula and Nazareth, it falls under the jurisdiction of Jezreel Valley Regional Council. In 2024 it had a population of 1,042.

== History ==
Kibbutz Mizra was established during Hanukkah in 1923 by the first immigrants of the Third Aliyah. It was founded on land near the Arab village of Rub al-Nasra, which was purchased from the Sursock family, a major absentee landowner of Lebanese origin. The inhabitants, approximately 50 families, were tenants and became dispossessed. The village was one of at least 20 Palestinian Arab villages that disappeared in the early 20th century due to Jewish land purchases and settlement in the Jezreel Valley (Marj ibn Amer).

The following year the founders of the kibbutz were joined by a group which had formed in Haifa, and in the 1930s were joined by Galician Hashomer Hatzair members from Aliyah Bet. During the Mandate era, Mizra hosted the Palmach headquarters, until it was discovered by the British authorities in Operation Agatha of 1946. The kibbutz also has a museum portraying the history of the Yishuv.

The name Mizra can be found on maps from the Middle Ages, though its exact origin is unknown. There is one theory that it is derived from nearby Nahal Mizra, though some believe that is connected to Hovat Mizra, an ancient farm in the area.

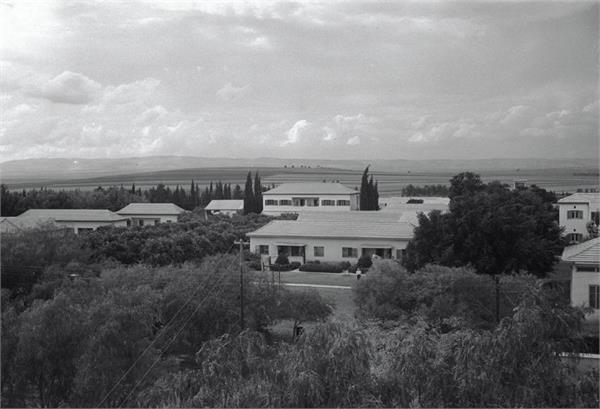
Mizra 1947

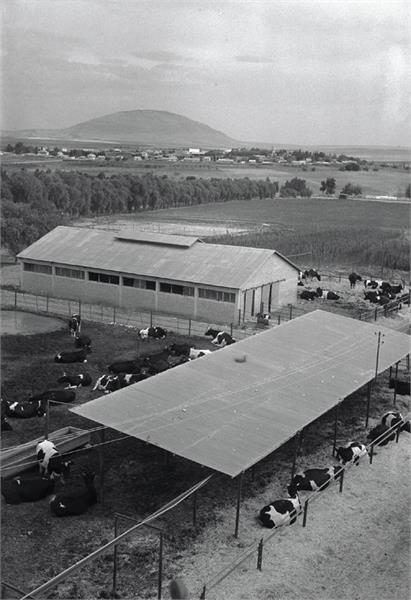
Mizra 1947

== Economy ==
Mizra is known in Israel for its meat processing plant and its store, Maadaney Mizra (Mizra delicatessen), which for many years was one of Israel's only providers of non-kosher meat, most notably pork. For the Israeli religious public, it was a symbol of impurity and a violation of the state's Jewish character. The Aliyah from the Commonwealth of Independent States in the 1990s brought Mizra competitors, and it eventually sold 75 percent of the plant to Tiv Ta'am, an Israeli supermarket chain that sells pork.

In 2007, Russian-Israeli billionaire Arcadi Gaydamak announced his plan to purchase Tiv Ta'am and turn it kosher, saying he would make Mizra supply chicken instead of pork. However, the deal fell through a few months later, when Gaydamak discovered a contract between Tiv Ta'am and Mizra, that prevented the chain from changing Mizra's character.

Today, in addition to the meat processing plant, Mizra employs a hydraulic machinery factory, and a factory for injecting metal powder. It also has a hotel and a room letting branch, for students of the nearby Max Stern Academic College of Emek Yezreel. In addition, the kibbutz also operates a center for alternative medicine, including Reiki, reflexology and Shiatsu.

== Notable people ==
- Mordechai Oren (1905–1985), one of the founders of Hashomer Hatzair and Mapam
- Ohad Naharin (born 1952), dancer and choreographer
