= Daniel Pe'er =

Israeli television host and newsreader

- דניאל פאר
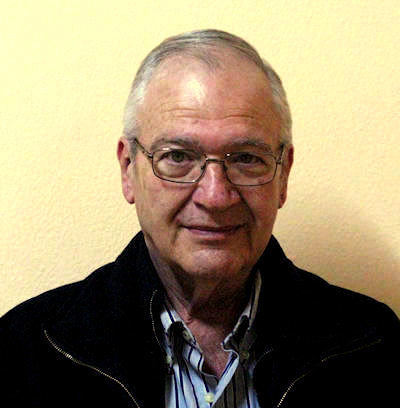
- Born: Daniel Freudenreich; 2 January 1943; Jerusalem, British Mandate of Palestine
- Died: 28 September 2017 (aged 74); Jerusalem, Israel
- Occupations: Television host, newsreader
- Years active: 1962–2010

Daniel Pe'er (born Daniel Freudenreich, Hebrew: דניאל פאר; 2 January 1943 – 28 September 2017) was an Israeli television host and newsreader.

== Early life ==
Daniel Freudenreich was born in Jerusalem, British Mandate of Palestine, to a Jewish family. He studied at Balfour school and the Ironi Alef High School in Tel Aviv.

He served in the Israel Defense Forces as a psychotechnical interviewer.

He majored in Hebrew literature and English linguistics at the Hebrew University in Jerusalem, and received a teaching certificate in English, where he continued his graduate studies at the Institute of Communication.

== Career ==
=== 1955–1969 ===
He began his career at the age of 12, on a program for youth, "Everything in Everything," as part of the Tel Aviv Children's Ulpan of Kol Yisrael. Participated in the presentation of the program "Hetz and Keshet - the microphone to the Gadna Authority" on Galei Tzahal, as a member of the Gadna troop.

In 1962, immediately after his discharge from the IDF, Pe'er was accepted as a news anchor and served as a news anchor and presented many programs, including "Diary of the Week" and "Radio Ten", which won him the IBA Prize.

In 1969 he was appointed head of the announcer section. In 1966-67 he worked as an editor, reporter, and broadcaster in the Hebrew Department of the Hebrew University of Jerusalem. Me. si. In London.

=== 1970–1995 ===
He began his career on television in 1970 as a presenter on the program "Headline and Margins". In 1971, he completed his radio career and moved to the television news section.

Over the years he has presented Mabat, Boker Tov Israel, special reports and news flashes, and served at different times as the head of the foreign news desk, the head of the training desk and the sub-editor of Mabat.

For ten years, between 1973 and 1983 he was identified with the consumer program Kolbotek, which was one of its founders and first mentor, with whom he was twice awarded the violin prize.

In 1979, Pe'er hosted the twenty fourth Eurovision Song Contest held in Jerusalem alongside Yardena Arazi. Pe'er continued to be associated with Eurovision, hosting Kdam Eurovision (the Israeli heat to choose the artist to represent Israel), which he hosted from 1981 until 1983 and again in 1986, he also gave the Israeli results out in 1992 and 1995 and provided the Israeli radio commentary on several occasions between 1981 and 2003.

On 16 February 1983, Pe'er and Dalia Mazor presented the first edition of Mabat in color.

On 13 December 1987, he directed and co-edited a new program on transportation called "Wheels". Later, her name was changed to "On Wheels" and it was aired until 1994.

From 1983 to 1985 he served as an educational emissary of the Jewish National Fund in Canada.

In 1989-1990 he dubbed the character of the narrator in the children's series "Amiko and his friends".

=== 1996–2013 ===
In 1998, in the Jubilee year, he presided over the Israel Prize ceremony.

In 2003 he was crowned the Movement for Quality Government.

In 2006–2007, he presented a corner called "The Day Before Me" on "Kach Heu".

Peer retired at the end of January 2010, after 48 years of broadcasting .

In the years 2010-2013 he joined the staff of the "Tal Kerem" program - Community Television Beit Hakerem Community Center, Jerusalem .

== Personal life and death ==
Pe'er was married and had four children. One of his sons, Yaron Pe'er, is a presenter for the Israeli Shopping Channel (Channel 21).

Pe'er died on 28 September 2017 after a stroke at Jerusalem's Shaare Zedek Medical Center.

== See also ==
- Television in Israel

Preceded by (France) Denise Fabre and Léon Zitrone	Eurovision Song Contest presenter (with Yardena Arazi); 1979	Succeeded by (Netherlands) Marlous Fluitsma
