= Western International Group =

Private conglomerate based in the United Arab Emirates

- Company type: Private company
- Industry: Conglomerate
- Founded: 1983
- Founder: K. P. Basheer
- Headquarters: Techno Park, Jebel Ali, Dubai, United Arab Emirates
- Area served: Worldwide
- Key people: K. P. Basheer (chairman)
- Subsidiaries: Nesto Group
- Website: www.westerninternationalllc.com

Western International Group is a privately held conglomerate headquartered in Dubai, United Arab Emirates. Founded by K. P. Basheer, the group operates across retail, consumer goods, electronics, home products and distribution businesses. Its best-known retail business is Nesto Group.

== History ==
Western International Group traces its origins to business activities started by Basheer in Bahrain in the 1980s before expanding into the United Arab Emirates and other markets. Forbes Middle East notes that Basheer established a shop in Bahrain called Gift Palace in 1986 and later consolidated his businesses into Western International Group.

By 2018, the company had grown into a Dubai-based conglomerate spanning multiple brands and sectors, with expansion plans valued at Dh2 billion over three years. Later that year, the group launched a venture capital unit focused on entrepreneurs in areas including e-commerce, trading and information technology.

In 2020, the group completed a large-scale SAP S/4HANA migration project, with Zawya describing it at the time as a global holding group with multiple verticals and more than 12,000 employees.

In 2025, Gulf News identified Western International Group as the company behind Nesto and said it planned to expand its Mark & Save value retail format with eight new stores across the Gulf region. The group was also identified in 2025 as the new management behind the redevelopment of Safeer Mall in Sharjah, which was to reopen under the interim name Mark & Save Mall after renovation.

== Operations ==
Western International Group operates in retail, distribution, household goods, consumer electronics, apparel and related sectors. Its corporate office is located in Techno Park, Jebel Ali, Dubai.

The group's retail activities include hypermarkets, supermarkets and value retail formats in Gulf markets, with Nesto Group serving as its principal supermarket and hypermarket business. A 2025 company statement carried by Zawya described Mark & Save as the group's mid-size value retail format and said the business had reached 150 retail stores across GCC markets, including Nesto and Mark & Save outlets.

== Companies and brands ==
According to the group's corporate materials, Western International Group's portfolio includes companies and brands operating in retail, consumer goods and lifestyle segments. These include:

- Nesto Group, a supermarket and hypermarket chain
- Geepas, an electronics and appliances brand
- Royalford, a homeware and kitchenware brand
- Olsenmark, an electronics brand
- Younglife, a fashion and accessories brand
- Parajohn, a luggage and travel accessories brand
- Babyplus, a baby products brand
- Brandzone, a retail format for branded goods
- Mark & Save, a value retail chain

== Recognition ==
Forbes Middle East included Basheer in its 2021 list of top Indian business leaders in the Middle East and described Western International Group as a diversified group spanning fashion, apparel, electronics, retail and e-commerce.

== See also ==
- Nesto Group
- K. P. Basheer
- List of companies of the United Arab Emirates
