= Spinneys =

Grocery chain in the Middle East

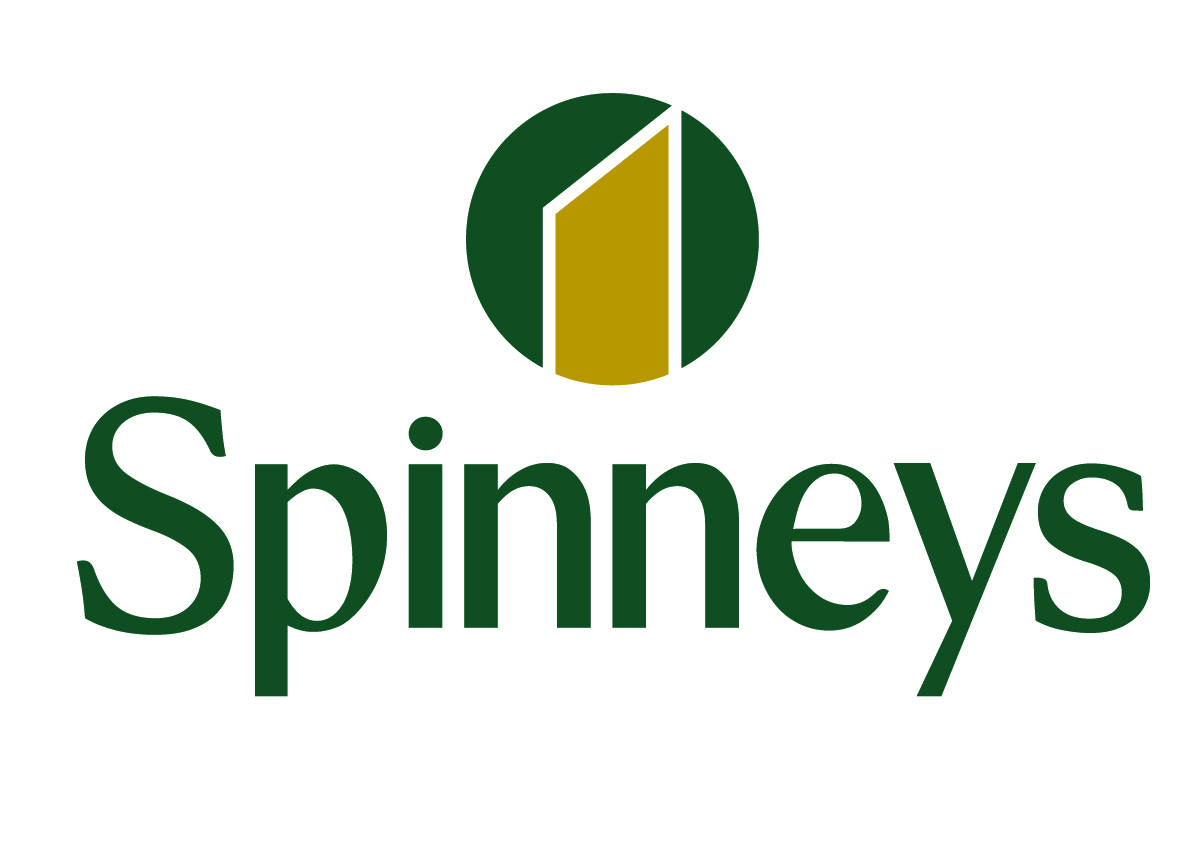
- Type: Public
- Traded as: DFM: SPINNEYS
- Industry: Retail (Convenience stores)
- Founded: 1924; 102 years ago
- Founder: Arthur Rawdon Spinney
- Headquarters: Dubai, United Arab Emirates
- Number of locations: 77+
- Website: www.spinneys.com

Spinneys is a supermarket chain active in the United Arab Emirates, Saudi Arabia, Egypt, Qatar, Lebanon, Oman and Iraq. It began as a railway provision merchant company, and expanded to a grocery firm importing British Empire goods to Mandate Palestine. The largest shareholder and manager of the brand is the Dubai based Al Bwardy Investment, founded by Ali Albwardy.

== History ==
Old Logo used in the U.A.E

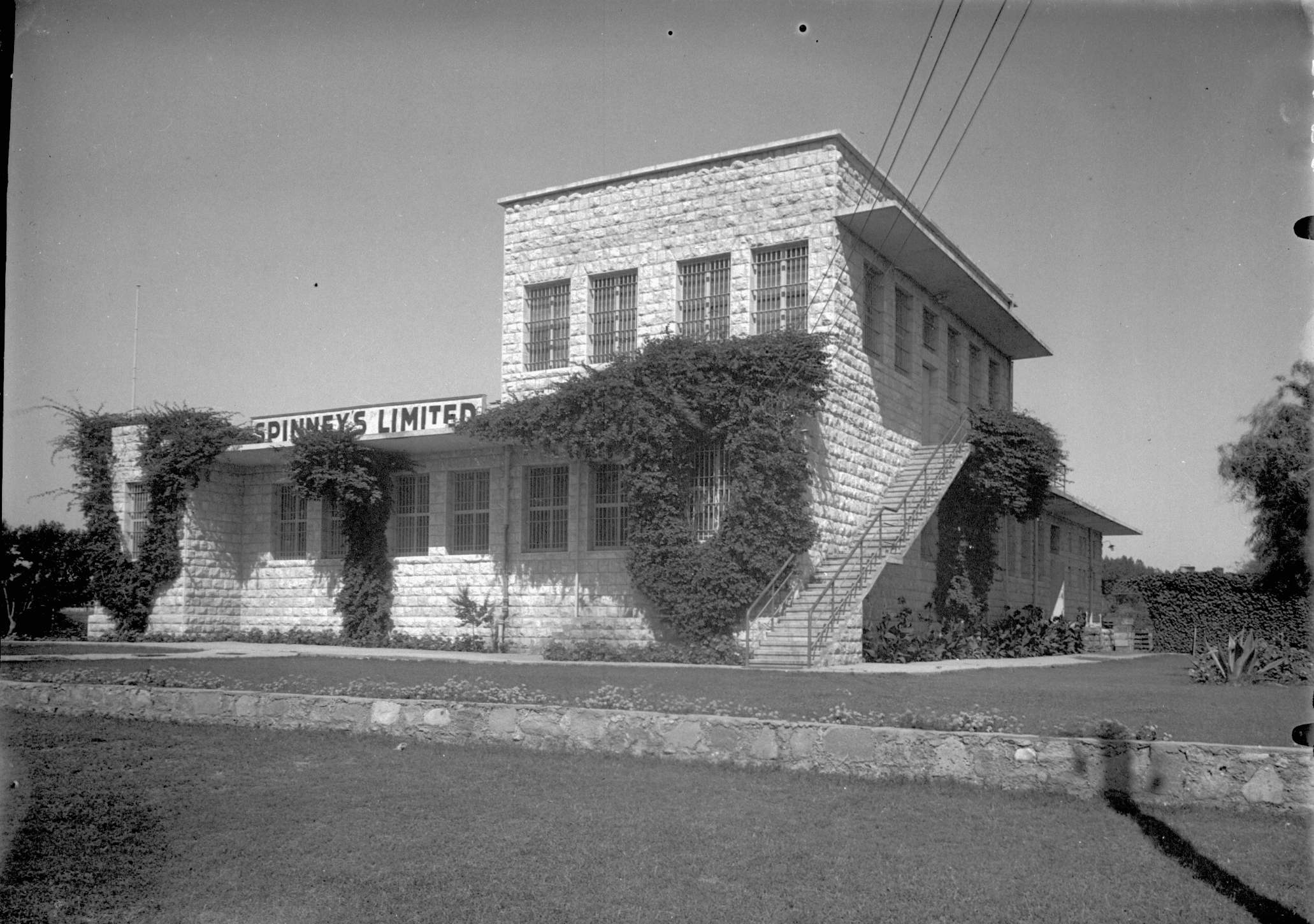
Spinney's Mineral Water Factory Acre, 1941

The supermarket was founded by Arthur Rawdon Spinney (CBE), who served in the Staffordshire Yeomanry, and later on the staff of General Allenby. In 1924, he organized a provision department for Palestine Railways in the suburbs of Alexandria. By 1929, he was already the President of the Economic Counsel of Haifa. His next move was establishing an import and shipping headquarters in Haifa. He sold imported English goods from a store on Jaffa Road through his two companies Spinney's Ltd., and Full-worth Ltd.

His commercial endeavors and connections to the Palestine Commissioner led to his appointment as trustee for Haifa during World War II. Spinney also served as the Hungarian Consul General in Palestine. He went on to open two branches in Jerusalem, in the Greek Colony and Mamilla, which operated until 1949.

Initially Spinneys branches were located in the major regional cities frequented by British subjects via the railway line: Alexandria, Cairo, Haifa, Acre where it operated the Kabri Mineral Factory and Damascus. Since the mid-1920s, the Haifa branch, where Spinney married Cecil Joan Glegg in 1928, and was later the President of The Haifa Rotary Club, also served as agents for P&O. Due to interruption to railway services, on which Spinneys depended, with the start of the 1936–1939 Arab revolt in Palestine it moved its Haifa branch, from Palestine to Baghdad.

Mr Spinney joined the UK establishment when his daughter Elisabeth married John Slim, 2nd Viscount Slim in 1958 in London.

In the 1960s Rawdon Spinney retired from active participation in the managing of the stores, and died in August 1973 in Littlehampton, Sussex, where he was buried in the Crematorium.

After the 14 July Revolution, its Baghdad store was relocated in 1961 to Dubai, Trucial States (now the United Arab Emirates) where it had operated since 1942 in Al Nasr Square, Deira. In later years other stores were opened across Arab states of the Persian Gulf region. In 1948 the first Spinneys store in Beirut Souks was open. Also stores were opened in every IPC pumping stations on the Kirkuk, Haifa and Tripoli pipelines.

== Present ==
As of 2011, Spinneys Dubai LLC is a premium supermarket retailer in the Middle East owned by Emirati businessman Mr. Ali Albwardy and operates fifty-six Spinneys stores in the United Arab Emirates, some stores in Oman and plans to expand into Saudi Arabia.

Shares in Spinneys, which then operated 75 supermarkets under its own brand in the United Arab Emirates and Oman, began trading on the Dubai Financial Market on 9 May 2024. The initial public offering raised Dh1.37 billion ($375.7 million). All 900 million shares in the offering, a 25 per cent stake in the company, were sold by Al Seer Group.

Spinneys will enter the Philippines as a joint-venture with Ayala Corporation, this was right after their announcement of Makro's re entrance from the same group.

== See also ==
- List of supermarket chains in the United Arab Emirates
- List of supermarket chains
- List of hypermarkets
