= Mordechai Oren =

Israeli politician (1905–1985)

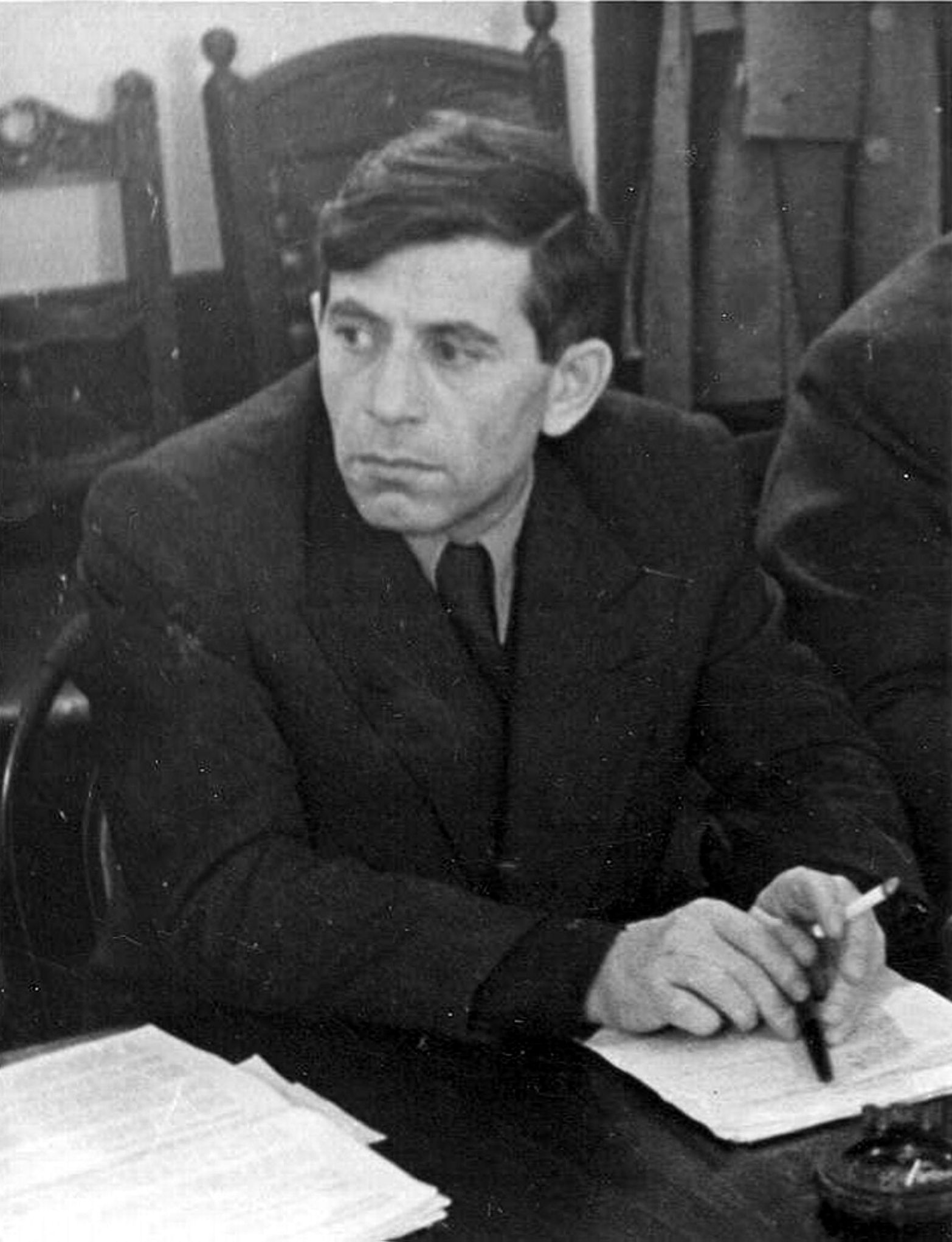
Oren in 1950

Mordechai Oren (Hebrew: מרדכי אורן; 1905–1985) was a leader of Mapam and the Kibbutz Artzi Hashomer Hatzair. He was implicated in a scandal which created an uproar in the state of Israel during the early fifties when he was tried in a show trial in Eastern Europe and was dubbed the "prisoner of Prague".

== Biography ==
Mordechai Oren was born in 1905 in the Galician town Podhajce of Austro-Hungary (now in Ukraine) and was one of the founders of the Hashomer Hatzair youth movement. He emigrated to Mandatory Palestine in 1929 and joined Hashomer Hatzair settlers in Ness Ziona, where he was involved in a dispute with Mapai activists. In 1934 he settled in Kibbutz Mizra and was elected in 1938 to the kibbutz's management. By the end of the year he was sent on a mission to London and Paris by Kibbutz Artzi Hashomer Hatzair. In 1940 he went to Geneva on a mission for the Halutz (pioneer) movement to establish the world headquarters there instead of the Warsaw headquarters which ceased to operate due to the Nazi occupation of Poland. In September 1944 he was elected to the Jewish National Council by Hazit Hasmol (the Left Front). In 1948 he was one of the founders of Mapam and represented the party in the Histadrut.

Oren was a radical supporter of the Soviet Union and praised its "freedom of vote" and its "democracy". During the Cold War in the fifties, Oren supported the pro-Soviet tendency of Mapam. In November 1951 he represented Mapam as an observer at the World Federation of Trade Unions in East Berlin and was also involved in negotiations regarding compensation for East German victims of the Holocaust. In that conference he said that the workers of Israel would never go to war against the Soviet Union. On his way from Berlin to Zurich, Oren passed through Prague where he stayed a few days on a mission for the Al Hamishmar paper which he was co-editor of. During this period, Oren and his relative Shimon Ornstein were arrested and accused of supporting Imperialism and of being a Zionist agent. Authorities in Czechoslovakia did not report Oren's detention and his relatives in Israel did not know where he had disappeared. Only at the end of March 1952 Czechoslovak authorities announced that Oren had been arrested on charges of crimes against state security.

Oren and Ornstein were forced to testify against the Czechoslovak leaders in a show trial held for them, as part of the Prague Trials. During the trial, Oren said the following which was recorded by the BBC:

Before I say anything about Slansky I want to say something about myself. I was an active member of Zionist organizations and acted against the people's democracies. Also I was in contact with espionage agencies and had to coordinate espionage activities, because since 1934, I had also served as an agent for the British Secret Service. Since 1945 my special missions were to conduct espionage operations against the people's democracies, especially Poland, Hungary, Czechoslovakia, Bulgaria, Romania and the East Germany. As part of the espionage I continued my work for international Zionist organizations.

— The Testimony of Oren

== Prison time and aftermath ==
Oren was sentenced to 15 years in prison, Ornstein to life imprisonment. This caused deep shock in the Israeli left and the party Mapam and the movement of the Kibbutz Artzi and resulted in a three-way split. A leftist group of followers of Moshe Sneh, who refused to condemn the Prague trial and the indictment, were forced to leave the kibbutz movement and Mapam and ultimately joined the Israeli Communist Party, while another group left Mapam for not being critical enough of the Soviet Union and formed Ahdut HaAvoda, which ultimately merged with Mapai to form the Israeli Labor Party.

Oren was released from prison during Prague's de-Stalinization period and came to Zurich on May 13, 1956, where he said the accusations against him were false, but this did not cause him to change his political views. When he returned to Israel he told the press of the torture he underwent in prison and of his show trial. He brought these experiences in writing his book Prague Prisoner's Notes which was published in 1958 and said that while he sat in prison felt that his party was sitting there with him. However Oren remained a socialist, and supported by the Soviet Union. In October 1963 Czechoslovak authorities announced re-examined his case and he was completely cleared. Oren was the last of those convicted in the Prague Trials to be exonerated.

Oren served as secretary general of the Mapam World Union from 1960 to 1964.

Mordechai Oren married Rega (Rivka) Varshaviak and had two children — Pua Gonen and author Moshe Oren. Mordechai Oren died in 1985, aged 80.

== See also ==
- List of kidnappings
