= Binyamina Winery =

Winery in Israel

Binyamina
- Location: Binyamina, Israel
- Coordinates: 32.5206°N 34.9473°E
- Wine region: Galilee, Shomron, Jerusalem Hills, Negev
- Formerly: Eliaz Winery
- Other labels: Avnei Hachoshen, Yogev, Tiltan, BIN, Teva
- Founded: 1952
- Key people: Sasson Ben Aharon, Chief Winemaker. Asaf Paz, Winemaker.
- Parent company: Hatzi Hinam
- Distribution: International
- Website: www.binyaminawines.co.il

The Binyamina Winery (Hebrew: יקב בנימינה) is Israel's fifth largest, producing about 2.8 million bottles of wine annually.

== History ==
The winery was founded in 1952 by Joseph Zeltzer as Eliaz Winery in the town of Binyamina. In those early years it produced mostly sweet wines and table wines, although it was also known for producing liquors under the label Hard Nut, named after Israeli prime minister David Ben Gurion, who was a "hard nut to crack". In 1994 it was purchased by a group of investors who renamed the winery and invested in new vineyards and technology. In 2008 the winery was purchased by supermarket chain Hatzi Hinam.

== Wines ==
Binyamina's high-end wine label, Avnei Hachoshen, contains six wines. Each is names after one of the stones in the biblical priestly breastplate, called hachoshen in Hebrew.

The Tiltan label, named after the Hebrew word for a clover (which contains three leaves), contains wines which use grapes from three different vintages.
