= CGC Japan =

Japanese supermarket

CGC Japan Co., Ltd.
- a current logo from March 1, 2023
- Native name: シジシージャパン
- Type: Kabushikigaisha
- Founded: October 27, 1973 (52 years ago) in 14-1-2 Ohkubo, Shinjuku, Tokyo, Japan
- Headquarters: Japan
- Key people: Takao Morota (森田隆夫) – CEO
- Revenue: ¥627,486,000,000
- Number of employees: 334
- Website: www.cgcjapan.co.jp

A current CGC Group's logo use since March 1, 2023

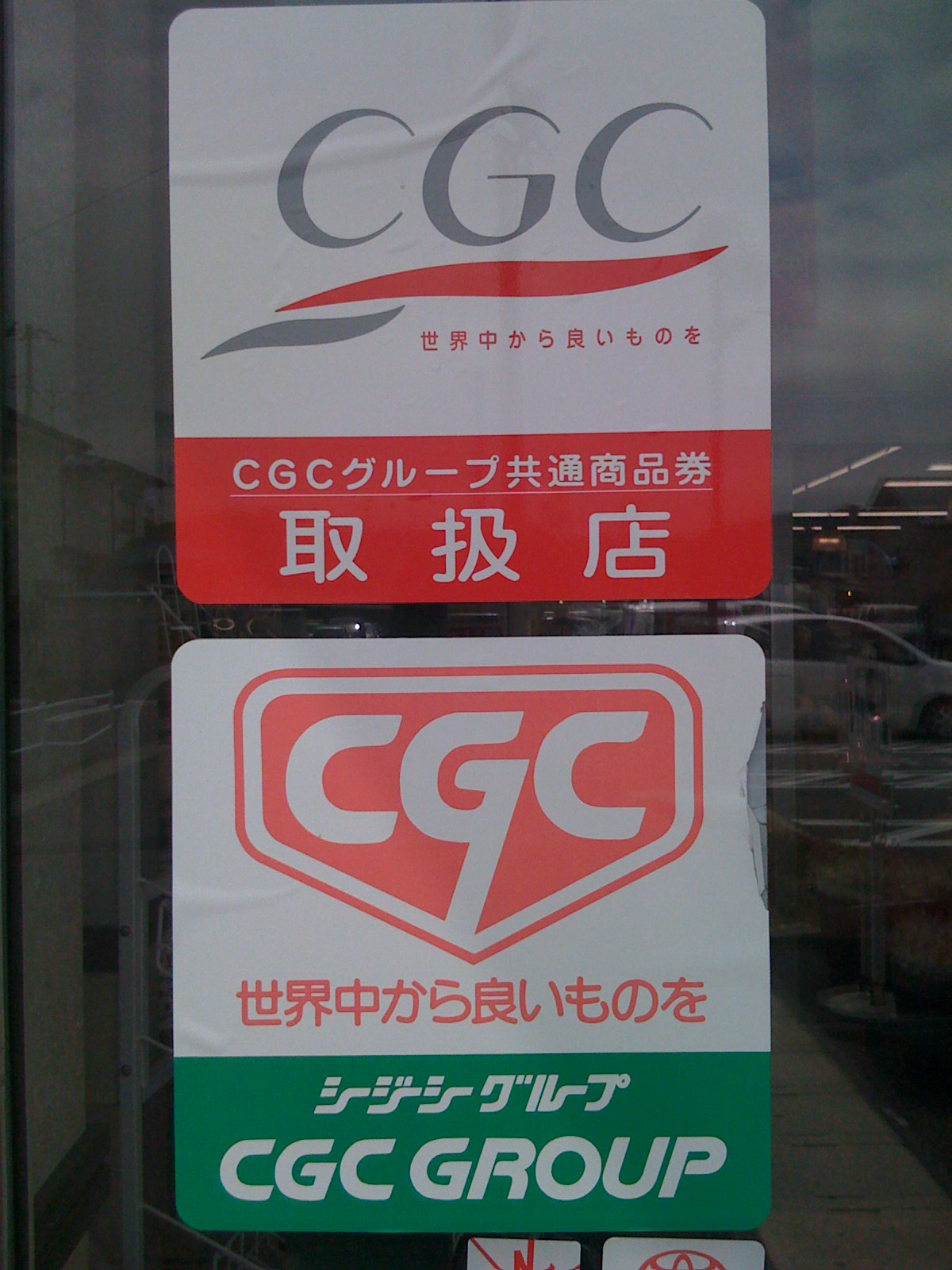
Picture show of used logo by February 2023 on CGC logo (above), former logo (below)

CGC Co., Ltd. (株式会社シジシージャパン, Kabushikigaisha CGC Japan), short for Co-operative Grocer Chain, is a Japanese supermarket co-financed by the CGC, which operates a private brand names corporation.

Its group scale as of October 2007 consisted of 225 member firms, 3,261 member shops and a group revenue of ¥3,668,200,000,000.

== Super Market ==
- Miyasuzu
- Food Plaza Hayashi
- Super Land Rome
- Super Market Bell
