= Tribeni =

Tribeni may refer to:

- Tribeni, Hooghly, town in Bansberia municipality, Hooghly district, West Bengal, India
- Tribeni, Parbat, former village development committee in Parbat District, Nepal
- Tribeni, Udayapur, former village development committee in Udayapur District in the Sagarmatha Zone of south-eastern Nepal

== People with the given name ==
- Tribeni Sahai Misra, former judge in India

== See also ==
- Triveni (disambiguation)
- Tribenisusta, a village in Nepal
- Aathrai Tribeni Rural Municipality, a rural municipality in Nepal
- Binayi Tribeni Rural Municipality, a rural municipality in Nepal
