= Royal Supermarket =

Supermarket chain in Macau

- Native name: Chinese: 來來超級市場; Portuguese: Supermercado Royal Companhia Limitada
- Company type: Limited Company
- Industry: retailing
- Founded: 1997
- Headquarters: Macau
- Area served: Macau
- Key people: Hin Ching, Chang
- Parent: Weng Fung Group
- Website: www.royalsupermarket.com.mo

Royal Supermarket (Chinese: 來來超級市場, Portuguese: Supermercado Royal Companhia Limitada, Japanese: ロイヤルスーパー) is the largest supermarket chain in Macau. It was founded in 1997 by Royal Group. Now, Royal Supermarket has 29 stores and 600 employees. In 2006, the 7th Royal branch (AV. de Morais), which is the largest supermarket in Macau with a floor space of 4,476m², has opened. For a decade, the store remained at 6 branches until 2006 when it began to expand to 30 branches. It sells both Chinese merchandise and imported goods. Royal Supermarket is a member of the Royal Group, a wholly owned subsidiary of Weng Fung Group. Royal Supermarket’s revenue in 2012 had a record of "double-digit" rate growing last year and that its share of the market had risen to about 30 percent.

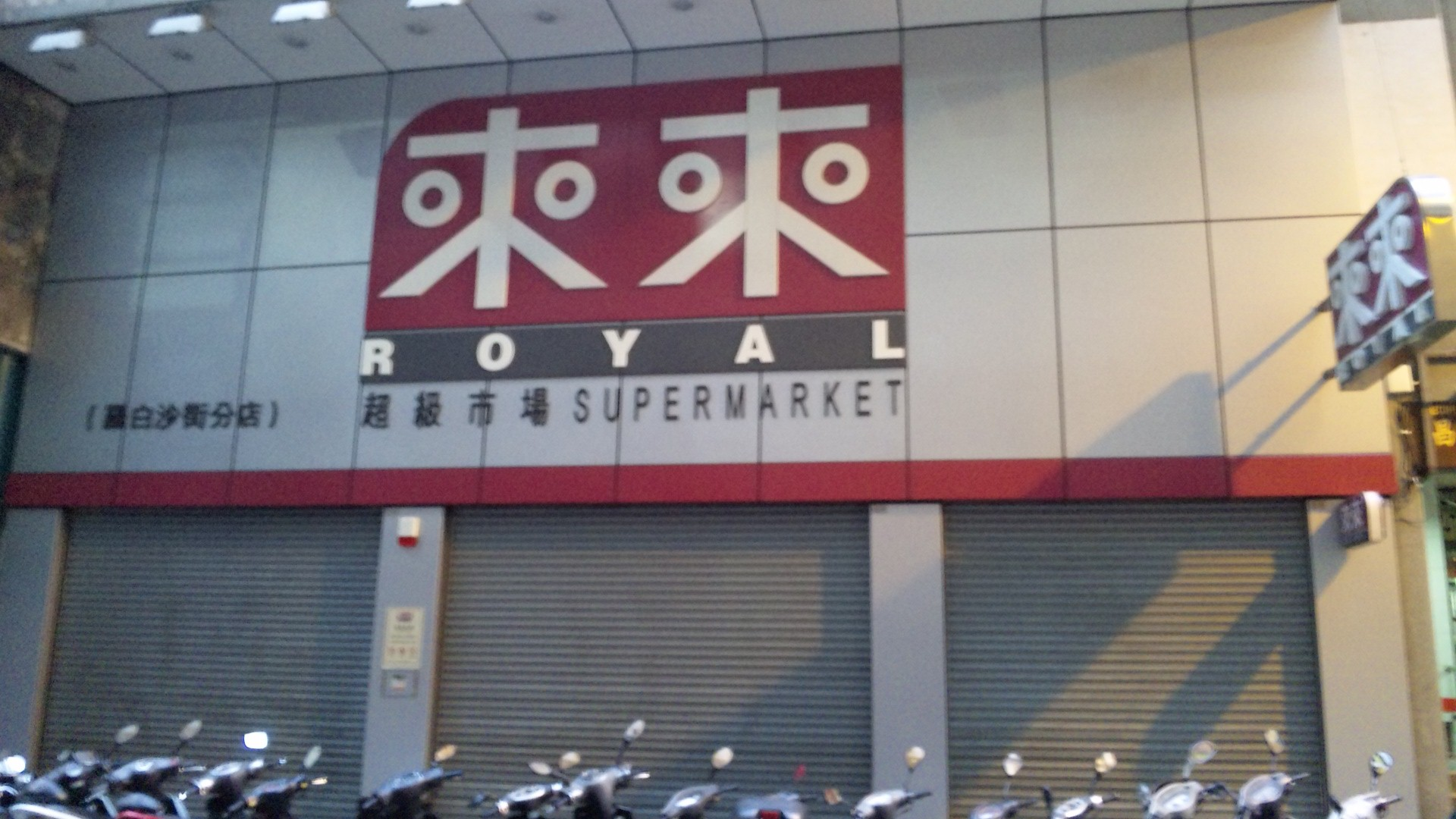
Royal 16 – Rua de Brás da Rosa Branch

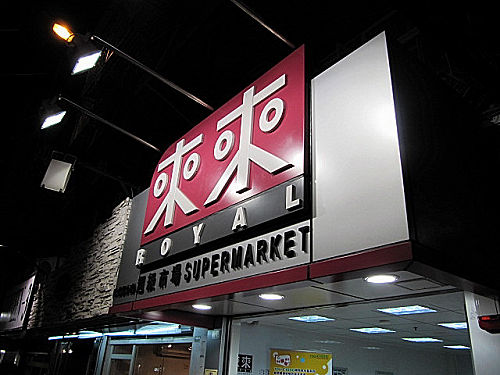
Royal 19 – Rua do Campo Branch

== History ==
=== Early years (1997–2004) ===
In 1997, Wing Fung Group, one of the famous pharmacy groups in Macau, opened their first Royal Supermarket in Mercado de S. Lourenço. Royal Supermarket intended to target the customers who had high purchasing power, so they usually sold their products at higher prices by comparison with other local supermarkets.

=== 2005–2007 ===
When Jeff Chang finished his study in Australia, he went back to Macau and was designated to be the chairman of the Royal Group. He discovered that there were some problems in the company, such as the slow product turnover rate, low efficiency of the employees, and the old image of the company. He knew that the company needed a revolution to be "The supermarket for Macau people." In 2005, the new logo of the Royal Supermarket was released. At the same time, employees' new uniforms, new price tags, and new plastic bags were released in order to bring a fresh image to Macau people. "People not only come to Royal to shop their products, but also the shopping experience," he said. In 2006, Royal's seventh branch in Venceslau dé Morais, the largest supermarket in Macau, was opened. What came into his mind was he would like to spread the target customers level. He tried to encourage teenagers to shop at Royal. This is quite different from the ancient view that supermarkets always targeted housewives. Moreover, in 2007, Royal Supermarket accepted the famous electronic payment Macau Pass in all of its branches, Royal being the first retail corporations to accept Macau Pass at that time.

=== Growth years (2008–2012) ===
Although the Subprime mortgage crisis attacked the economy in Hong Kong and Macau, Royal's business was still growing at a steady rate. Royal expanded its branches boldly in 2008, nearly located a new branch every month. The most successful stores are the branches near the Praca das Portas do Cerco. For example, the Royal 15th branch was located in front of the thoroughfare to ZhuHai, China. Many customers from mainland China always did rush shopping there, especially in peak hours. Long waiting lines can always be seen there even if Royal has placed more cashiers in that store. The operating hour was from 10:00 to 23:30 in the first month though, later on it had extended immediately.
In 2012, Royal has promoted many functions such as the “Scratch and Snatch Travelling Prize," "Royal Taiwanese food festival," and "Royal Japanese-Korean food festival" to celebrate the 15th anniversary of Royal.

=== Target the high-end years (2013–2014) ===
Royal Group has opened two new brands of supermarkets in Macau. They are used to target wealthy customers. One is called "Supreme Food Market," which is mainly selling imported goods and ingredients; the other one is called "Grand Mart," which only sells Japanese goods. Grand Mart even has fresh stalls selling sushi and sashimi in order to be of a similar operation to a Japanese supermarket. Until Feb 2014, Royal Group had 30 branches in Macau and 4 branches in Mainland-China. It has the largest supermarket-chain in Macau, compared to their major competition Parknshop which has 15 branches and San Miu Supermarket which has 14 branches.

== Target ==
As the supermarket for Macau people, Royal Group has put a target in place of 30 stores.
Mr. Jeff Chang, the chairman of Royal Supermarket, has opened a high-end supermarket, SUPREME Food Market, which mainly sells various import goods to expatriates and naive residents to Macau people in 2013. He decided to open more SUPREME Food Markets in short period.

== Rewards program ==
On September 1, 2010, Royal Supermarket introduced Royal Jetso Card(Chinese: 來來Jetso卡), a program that rewards customers for shopping in their stores. To participate, a customer completes a registration form and receives 4 Royal Jetso Cards (a credit card-sized card and three keytags). When the program was introduced, participating customers received one point for every $1 they spent in a single transaction (transactions with totals under $1 did not receive a point).

Using a Royal Jetso Card can provide discounts for most of the products. Customers can get rewards when they had certain numbers of points in their accounts.

== Security ==
For customers' security, Royal Supermarket placed a security officer in their stores to ensure the safety of the customers.

== Contributions ==
Royal Supermarket was the first supermarket in Macau to join The Day of No Plastic Bags which was held by Macao SAR Government Consumer Council on the 18th and the 28th of every month. On that day, shopkeepers will remind customers not to use plastic bags.
Royal Supermarket was featured in the August issue of Macau Business magazine, ranking as the FIRST 100 leading companies to watch.

== Locations ==
There are 31 Royal Supermarkets in Macau:

Stores	Address	Operating Hours
Royal 1 – Mercado de S. Lourenço	RUA DA PRAIA DO MANDUCO 57.	08:15–22:45
Royal 2 – Hipódromo	ESTRADA DE CACILHAS, 19–27	09:00–23:00
Royal 3 – Man On	IAO HON, MAN ON SAN TCHUN PLAZA, R/C	08:00–23:00
Royal 4 – Polytex	AVENIDA 1º DE MAIO, ED. POLYTEX GARDEN, 361–381	09:00–23:15
Royal 5 – Almirante Lacerda	AV. ALMIRANTE LACERDA, 39D AB.	10:00–23:00
Royal 6 – Rua de Francisco Xavier Pereira	RUA DE FRANCISCO XAVIER PEREIRA, 83–85 C	08:30–00:45
Royal 7 – Venceslau de Morais	AVENIDA DE VENCESLAU DE MORAIS NO.181-183 RC / ANDAR 1	09:30–23:00
Royal 8 – Coronel Mesquita	AVE. DO CORONEL MESQUITA N°11-G RC MACAU	09:00–23:00
Royal 9 – Yue Xiu	AVE. DO OUVIDOR ARRIAGA NO.59-A EDF YUE XIU GARDEN F RC	09:00–00:45
Royal 10 – Kam Lei Tat	RUA DE FAT SAN, NO. 104-184, RC, EDIF. KAM LEI TAT, LOJAS R,S,T,U, TAIPA.	09:00–23:00
Royal 11 – Est. de Coelho do Amaral	ESTRADA DE COELHO DO AMARAL, NO. 51-61, EDIF. BANCO TAI FUNG, F,G, RC, MACAU.	09:00–23:15
Royal 12 – Rua Seis Bairro Iao Hon	RUA SEIS BAIRRO IAO HON, NO.50-58, EDIF. MAU DAN LAU, D, RC, MACAU.	10:30–22:00
Royal 13 – Dr. Rodrigo Rodrigues	AVENIDA DO DR.RODRIGO RODRIGUES, NO.301-319, KENG FONG HOU TENG, A-H, R/C & 1 ANDAR, MACAU	09:30–23:00
Royal 14 – Canal Das Hortas Kin Fu	RUA DO CANAL DAS HORTAS, NO. 188-196, EDIF. RIN FU SAN CHUN, LOJAS D.I.T., RC, MACAU	08:30–23:45
Royal 15 – Praça das Portas do Cerco	PRAÇA DAS PORTAS DO CERCO, NO. 140, RC, MACAU	08:30–23:45
Royal 16 – Rua de Brás da Rosa	RUA DE BRÁS DA ROSA, NO. 36-50, JARDIMS DE CHEONG MENG, MENG SENG GARDEN, RC, LOJA A, F, MACAU	08:00–23:15
Royal 17 – Sunny View	RUA FRANCISCO XAVIER PEREIRA, NO. 124D-124G, EDIF. SUNNY VIEW	09:30–23:00
Royal 18 – Nam Fai	RUA DA PAZ, NO. 107-117, EDF. NAM FAI, RC, LOJA C, D, E, F, MACAU	09:00–23:00
Royal 19 – Rua do Campo	TRAVESSA DO PADRE SOARES, NO. 13, RC, MACAU	09:30–22:30
Royal 20 – N.A.P.E.	AVENIDA DO GOVERNADOR JAIME SILVÉRIO MARQUES, NO. 409, BL. II, RC, LOJA O, MACAU.	10:00–00:45
Royal 21 – The Macau Square	Rua do Dr. Pedro José Lobo, NO. 2-16A, THE MACAO SQUARE, 1 ANDAR, MACAU	10:00–22:00
Royal 22 – Edif. Tai Fung	RUA DO CANAL DAS HORTAS, NO. 63-69, EDIF. TAI FUNG San Chuen, RC, MACAU	11:00–22:30
Royal 23 – Santo António	Rua de Santo António, NO. 7C, EDF. CHEUNG WAN, RC, MACAU	09:00–22:45
Royal 24 – Kin Wa	Av. do Alm. Magalhaes Correia, NO. 220, EDF. KIN WA BLOCO 10, RC, MACAU	09:00–23:30
Royal 25 – Mercado Vermelho	EM Macau, Avenida Do Almirante Lacerda No.81, San Tou Res-Do-Chao	08:30–23:00
Royal 26 – Da Ming Court	Travessa do Conselheiro Borja, NO. 16-40, Edf. Da Ming Court, R/C, Macau	08:30–23:00
Royal 28 – Yi Nam	ESTCADA DOS COVALEIROS, NO. 71-71A, EDIF. YI NAM C,S, R/C, MACAU	09:00–23:00
Royal 29 – Sun Star Plaza	RUA DA PAZ, No. 166-174, SUN STAR PLAZA, BL. 3, RC D,E,F,T,U,V & 1 ANDAR, MACAU	09:00–23:00
Royal 30 – Luen San	Rua Sul do Patane, No. 72, Luen San Square, R/C, MACAU	08:30–23:00
Royal 31 – Cinco de Outubro	Rua Cinco de Outubro, No.71, Kong Va Res-do-Chao B	09:30–22:30
Royal 32 – Ponte e Horta	Travessa do Gamboa, No. 11A-15, Edificio Iao Kuan, R/C, Macau	09:00–22:00

== Slogans ==
1. The supermarket for Macau people.(Chinese: 來來超級市場，係澳門人嘅超級市場。)
2. Endless jetsos, at Royal.(Chinese: 密密嚟來來，精彩Jetso不斷來。)
