= Tiv Ta'am =

Israeli supermarket chain

Tiv Ta'am Holdings 1 Ltd.

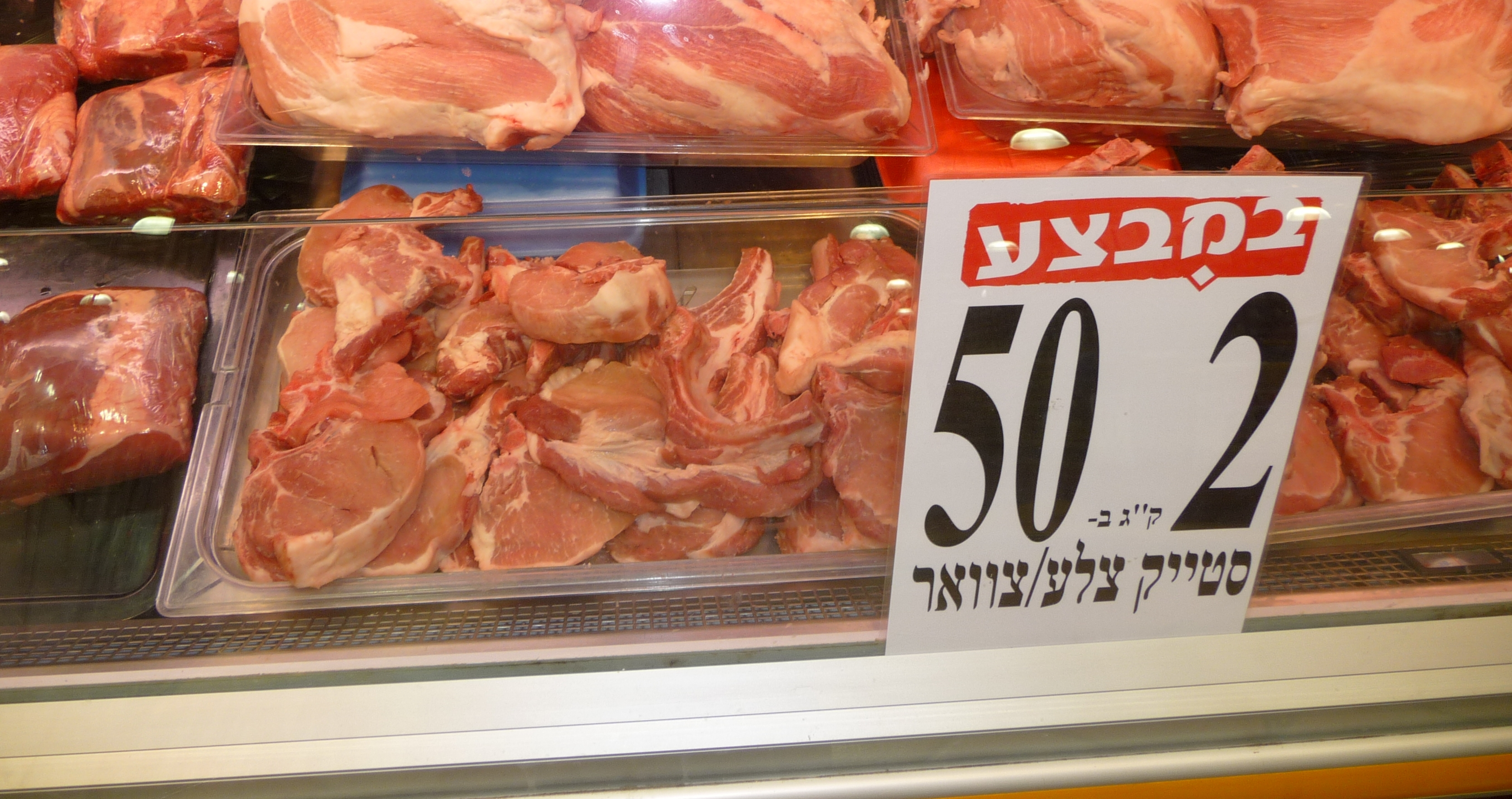
- A promotional offer on pork chops (50 shekels for 2 kg) at the Beer-Sheva branch.
- Type: Public (TASE: TTAM)
- Industry: Retail
- Founded: Israel (1989)
- Headquarters: Emek Hefer, Israel
- Key people: Kobi Tribitch (Chairman); Ido Helft (CEO); Roy Inbar (CFO)
- Products: Fresh produce, chicken, beef, pork, fish and seafood, imported wine with cheese
- Website: tivtaam.co.il

Tiv Ta'am (Hebrew: טִיב טַעַם, lit. "Quality Taste") is an Israeli supermarket chain, notable for being the country's most prominent purveyor of pork and other products not complying with the kosher dietary laws of Judaism. Tiv Ta'am is Israel's largest producer and supplier of non-kosher meat, and is also noted for most of its branches staying open during the Jewish Sabbath and on Jewish holidays (except Yom Kippur). Some of its branches are open 24/7. As of 2020, there are over 40 Tiv Ta'am branches throughout Israel. The company is also involved in food processing and formerly in telecommunications.

== History ==
Tiv Ta'am was founded by Kobi Tribitch and Tzachi Lipka in 1989. The company is today a national chain. In addition to the supermarkets throughout Israel, Tiv Ta'am is also involved in food processing and production, including hot dogs, chicken, fish, seafood, dried fruits, cheeses and wine, and formerly in telecommunication, which included the importing, marketing and distribution of telecommunication switchboards. In 2007 Tiv Ta'am sold its holding in the telecommunication satellite company Satcom Ltd., and in September 2008 it sold its holdings in Tadiran Telecom.

=== Potential sale ===
In June 2007, Israeli businessman Arcadi Gaydamak made an offer to purchase the company with a public commitment to turn the supermarket kosher and stop selling pork. He also said that he would make Mizra, the factory which produces pork products for Tiv Ta'am, supply chicken instead.

A few days later, the deal collapsed when Tribitch refused to knock $10 million off the purchase price and it became apparent that turning the supermarket kosher was infeasible. Mizra had a contract with Tiv Ta'am that allowed it to sell pork, and some analysts believed Gaydamak realized most of Tiv Ta'am's customers shopped there specifically for non-kosher products.

=== Controversy ===
Controversy was created in 2006 when the Israeli investigative affairs show Kolbotek alleged that Tiv Ta'am was selling meat after its expiration date. In 2007, Kolbotek showed video of cats roaming one of Tiv Ta'am's storerooms and eating food, prompting Tiv Ta'am to run a $500,000 advertising campaign to improve its image. Tiv Ta'am has been criticized by Haredi Jews for selling non-kosher products such as pork, with many boycotting the chain.
