= Scarlett Supermarket =

Singaporean supermarket chain

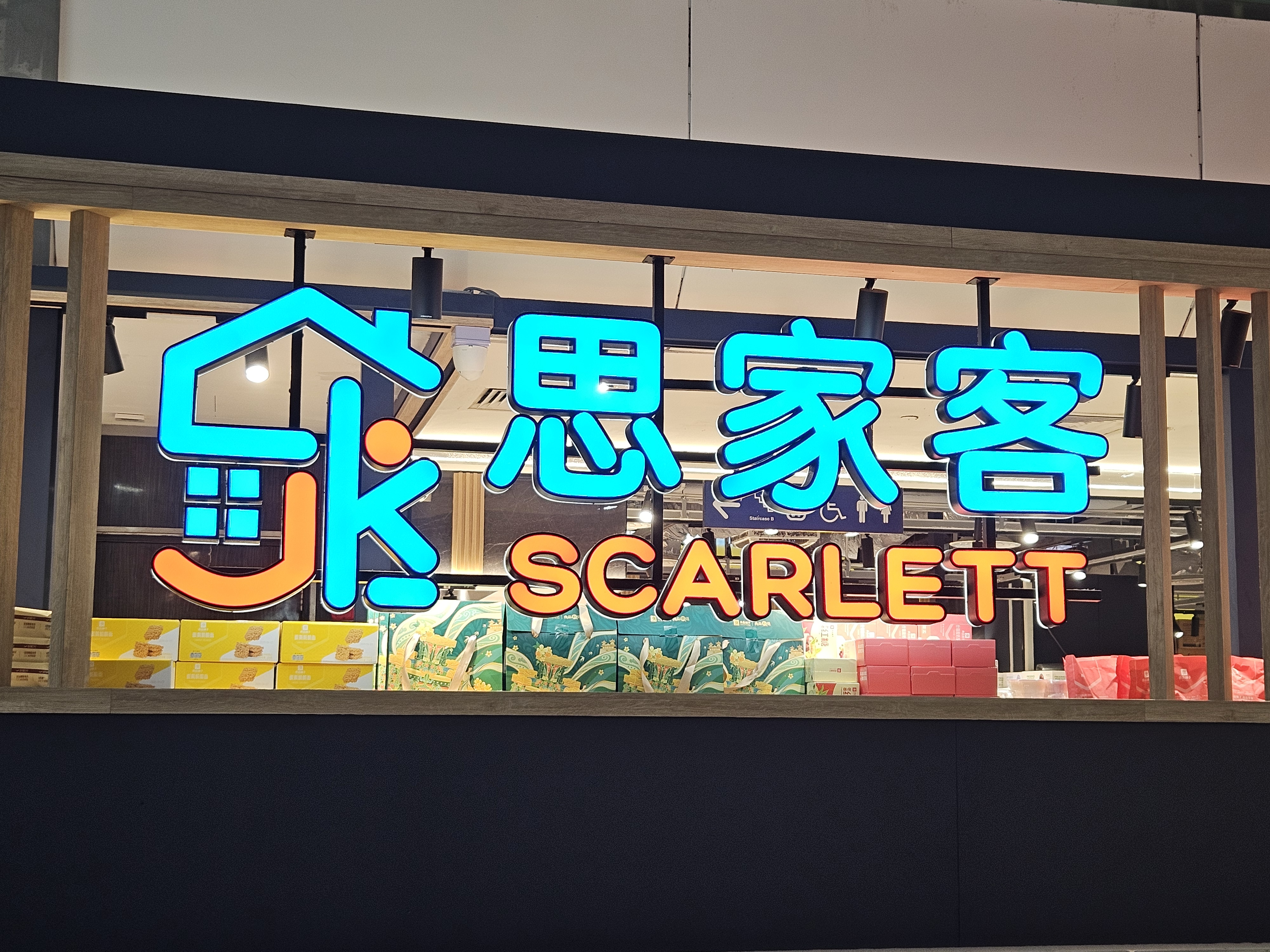
- Signboard of Scarlett Supermarket, Grantral Mall, Clementi, Singapore (17 May 2025)
- Native name: 思家客国货超市
- Romanized name: Sī Jiā Kè Guóhuò Chāoshì
- Company type: Subsidiary
- Industry: Retail
- Founded: October 2020; 5 years ago
- Headquarters: Singapore
- Products: Grocery store, Supermarket, Hypermarket
- Parent: Green Olive Group Pte Ltd
- Website: www.scarlettsupermarket.com.sg

Scarlett Supermarket
- Simplified Chinese: 思家客
- Traditional Chinese: 思家客
Transcriptions
Standard Mandarin
- Hanyu Pinyin: Sī Jiā Kè

Scarlett Supermarket (Chinese: 思家客国货超市 Sī Jiā Kè Guóhuò Chāoshì) is a Singapore-based supermarket chain primarily focused on selling Chinese products. It was founded in Singapore, with its first store opening in October 2020 on Trengganu Street in Chinatown. It later expanded to areas such as Geylang and Bedok, and launched an online store on Shopee in 2021.

== Products and services ==
Scarlett Supermarket mainly sells food and daily necessities made in China, including snacks, beverages, condiments, frozen foods, and household goods. It offers both online and offline shopping channels.

== Store locations ==
As of May 2025, Scarlett Supermarket operates a total of 39 stores in Singapore, covering the city center and various residential districts. The stores in Chinatown, Geylang, and Bedok are open 24 hours.

== Controversies ==
Scarlett Supermarket has been involved in a number of controversies.

=== Illegal suppliers ===
In May 2021, Scarlett Supermarket was found to be selling products sourced from illegal food operators. The Singapore Food Agency ordered the products to be withdrawn from sale.

=== Missing English labels ===
In September 2021, over half of the food products at Scarlett Supermarket were found not to have English labels as required by law. The company was also found to have sold banned meat products.

=== Ingredient translation error ===
In November 2024, an instant product called "Liu Yi Pao Xi'an Paomo" sold by Scarlett Supermarket mistakenly listed the food additive glacial acetic acid as the controlled drug methamphetamine in its English ingredient label, causing public concern. General Manager Wang Liwen clarified that the product did not contain the drug, and the error was due to a Chinese supplier's mistranslation. The affected batch was removed from the Lot One store and sent back to the warehouse for disposal.
