= Osher Ad =

Israeli supermarket chain

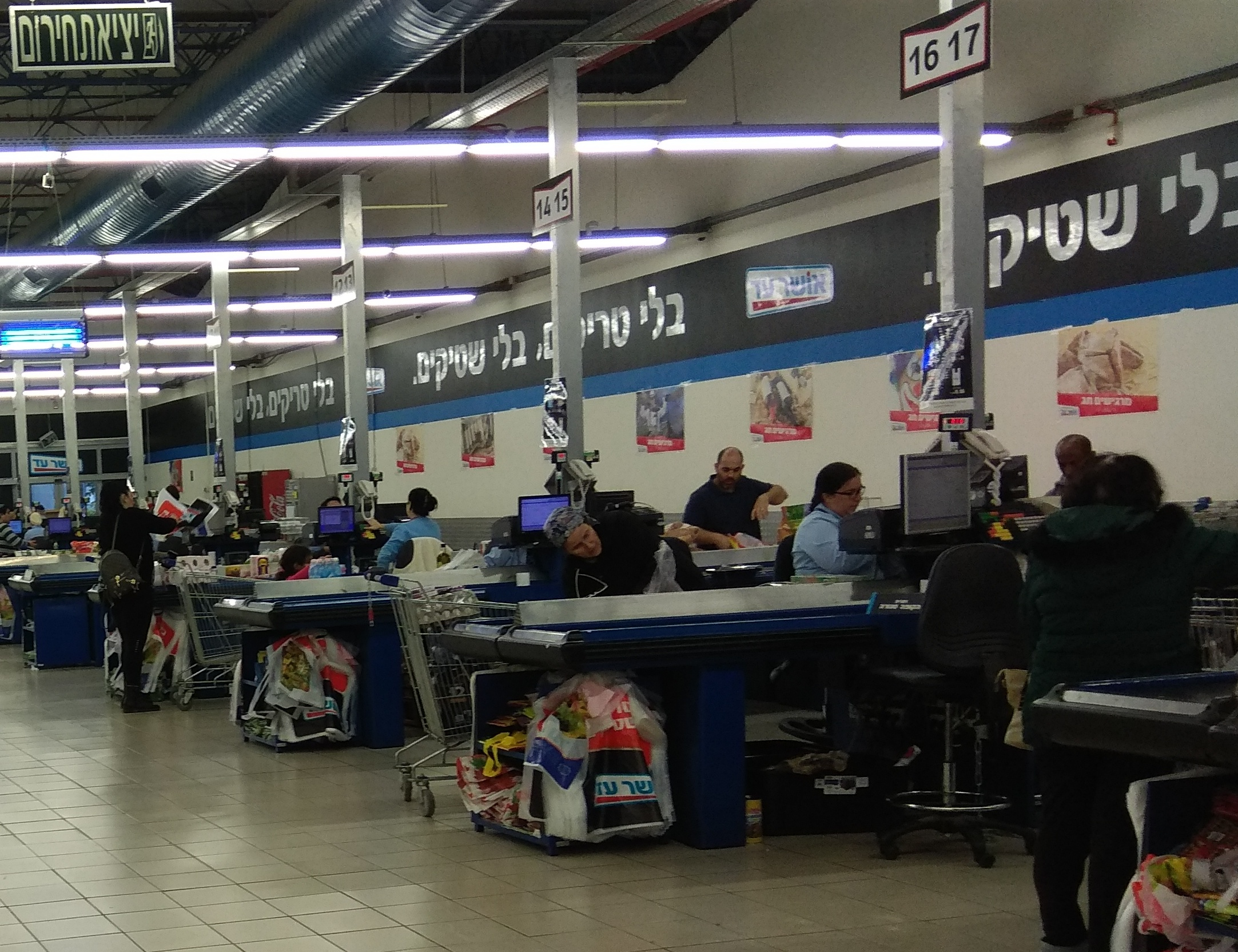
- Type: Supermarket
- Founded: 2009
- Revenue: 4.9 billion NIS (2023)
- Website: osherad.co.il

Osher Ad (Hebrew: אושר עד), officially Merav, Mazon Kol Ba'am (Hebrew: מרב – מזון כל בע"מ) is an Israeli supermarket chain established in 2009, founded by Avraham Moshe Margalit, Aryeh Boim, and Yehuda Laniado.

Osher Ad has 21 supermarkets in Israel and 4 supermarkets (under the name "Bingo Wholesale") in the United States.

== History ==
The chain emerged following their previous venture, the "Alef" marketing chain, which catered primarily to an ultra-Orthodox audience. The trio, affiliated with the secular Gor and Naiad Hasidim, initially sold their shares in "Alf" to Shufersal in 2008 for NIS 140 million, leading to the establishment of Osher Ad after a one-year cooling-off period.

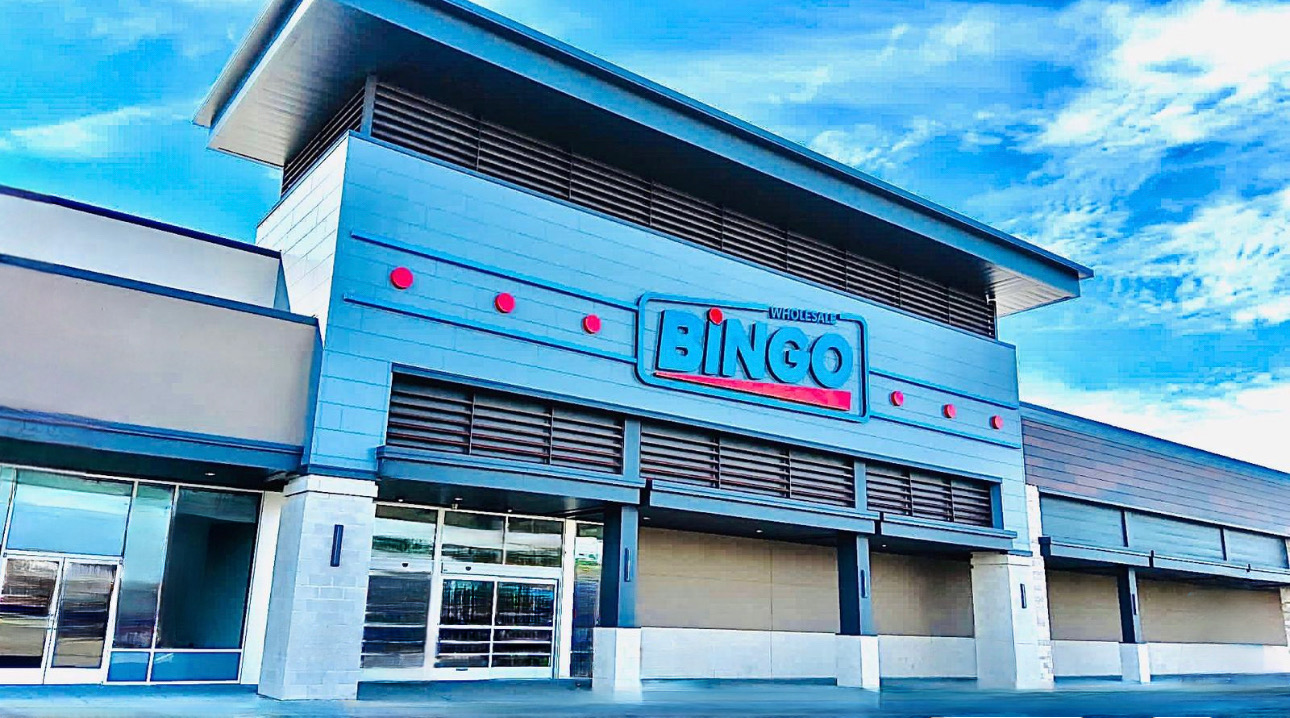
"Bingo Wholesale" in Lakewood

According to the Dun & Bradstreet ranking published in 2023, Osher Ad is the third largest food chain in Israel in terms of sales turnover, with an amount of NIS 4.9 billion per year.

Osher Ad Petach Tikva

In 2019, the chain opened their first store outside of Israel, in the United States, in Brooklyn, NY.
