= Kolbotek =

- Created by: Rafi Ginat
- Starring: Rafi Ginat
- Country of origin: Israel

Original release
- Network: Channel 1 Channel 2 (Reshet); Channel 10
- Release: December 1974 – 2014

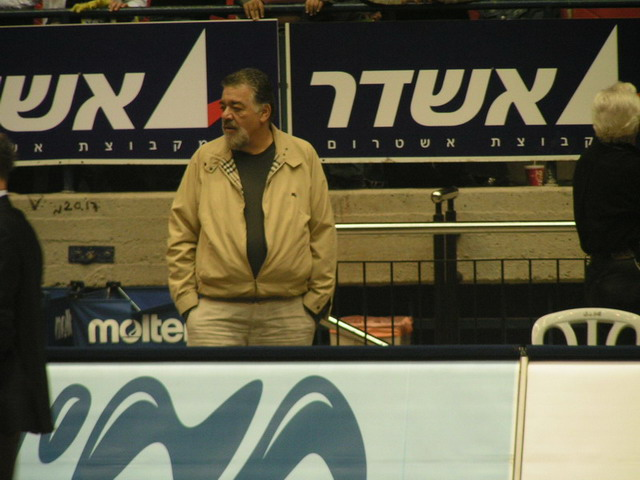
Rafi Ginat

Kolbotek (Hebrew: כלבוטק) is a veteran Israeli consumer affairs and investigative reporting TV show on Channel 2. It premiered in December 1974 on Channel 1 and was then presented by Daniel Pe'er. Since 1979, its editor and producer, Rafi Ginat, has presented the show.
