= Nesto Group =

Retail chain headquartered in the United Arab Emirates

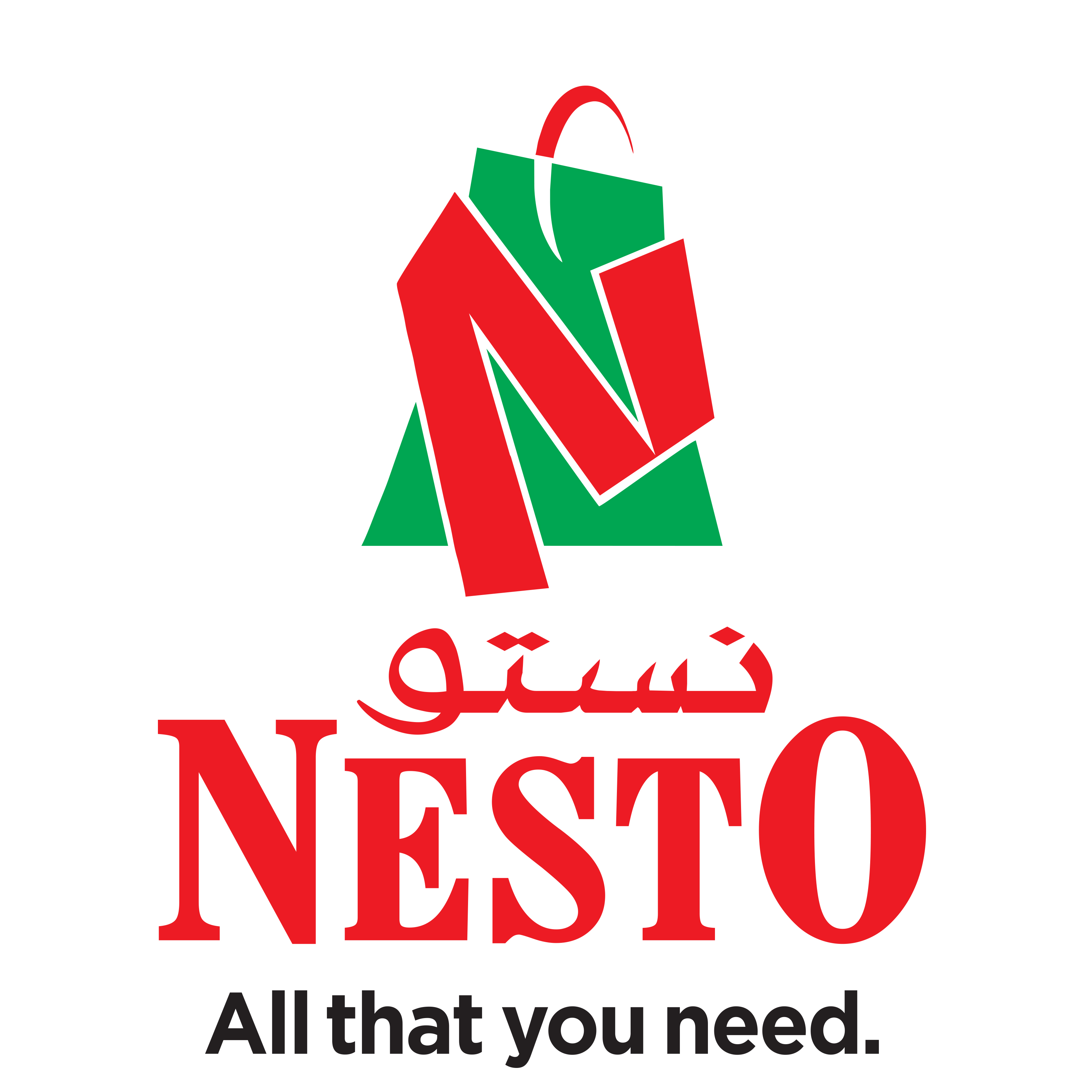
- Type: Private company
- Industry: Retail
- Founded: 2004
- Founder: K. P. Basheer
- Headquarters: Al Arab Mall, New Al Taawun Road, Sharjah, United Arab Emirates
- Area served: Gulf Cooperation Council countries and India
- Parent: Western International Group
- Website: nestogroup.com

Nesto Group is a retail chain headquartered in Sharjah, United Arab Emirates. Founded in 2004 by K. P. Basheer, it operates hypermarkets and supermarkets across Gulf Cooperation Council countries and India. It is part of the Western International Group.

== History ==
Nesto was founded in 2004 by K. P. Basheer as part of the Western International Group's retail business. Gulf News reported in 2012 that Western International Group planned to invest more than Dh500 million in expanding the Nesto chain across Gulf Cooperation Council countries.

By April 2017, Nesto had opened its 50th outlet in the GCC, in Al-Ahsa, Saudi Arabia. In July 2020, the company opened what it described as its 82nd hypermarket, in Deira, Dubai. Gulf News later reported that the company opened its 92nd hypermarket in Dubai's Al Nahda district in June 2021.

In 2021, Forbes Middle East included Basheer in its list of top Indian business leaders in the Middle East and noted that Nesto had 85 outlets across the GCC and India at the time.

== Operations ==
Nesto operates hypermarkets and supermarkets in the UAE, Saudi Arabia, Bahrain, Kuwait, Oman, Qatar and India. As of March 2026, the company states that it has more than 140 outlets and over 8 million square feet of retail space. In a 2019 overview of supermarkets in the UAE, Gulf News described Nesto as a chain that particularly dominates the Sharjah and Ajman market.

== Philanthropy ==
In April 2023, Nesto Group said it would contribute Dh10 million over five years to the UAE's 1 Billion Meals Endowment campaign.

== See also ==
- Western International Group
- LuLu Group International
- List of companies of the United Arab Emirates
