= Rami Levy Hashikma Marketing =

Third largest Israeli retail supermarket chain

Rami Levy Chain Stores Hashikma Marketing 2006 Ltd.
- Type: Public company
- Traded as: TASE: RMLI
- Industry: Supermarket
- Founded: 1976; 50 years ago
- Founder: Rami Levy
- Headquarters: Jerusalem, Israel
- Number of locations: 44 supermarkets 20 cellular communications stores
- Key people: Rami Levy (Owner and CEO); Adina Levy (CFO); Shmulik Levy (Vice President Operations)
- Revenue: NIS 1.14 billion (US$401 million) (2013)
- Operating income: NIS 115 million (US$32 million) (2010)
- Net income: NIS 92.47 million (US$27 million) (2011)
- Total assets: NIS 643 million ($US179 million) (2010)
- Total equity: NIS 500 million (US$139 million) (2010)
- Owner: Rami Levy
- Number of employees: 5,000+
- Subsidiaries: Yafiz clothing stores Rami Levy Communications; Israir Airlines
- Website: www.rami-levy.co.il

Rami Levy Hashikma Marketing (Hebrew: רמי לוי שיווק השקמה, Rami Levy Shivuk Hashikma) is the third largest Israeli retail supermarket chain, behind Shufersal Ltd. and Alon Holding–Blue Square Ltd., with annual revenues of NIS 1.14 billion (US$401 million). Founded in 1976 on Rehov Hashikma (Sycamore Street) in the Mahane Yehuda Market district, Rami Levy was Israel's first discount store. The chain claims to slash the price of the average basket of goods by as much as 20%. The company went public on the Tel Aviv Stock Exchange in 2007 and has increased its sales volume and number of stores each year since. Rami Levy operates a chain of 44 discount supermarkets in Central and Northern Israel, as well as the West Bank. It also distributes wholesale to 450 stores in and around Jerusalem. The company has diversified into retail clothing sales, real estate, and cellular communications, with 20 stores of Rami Levy Communications selling cellular phone services at a discount.

== History ==
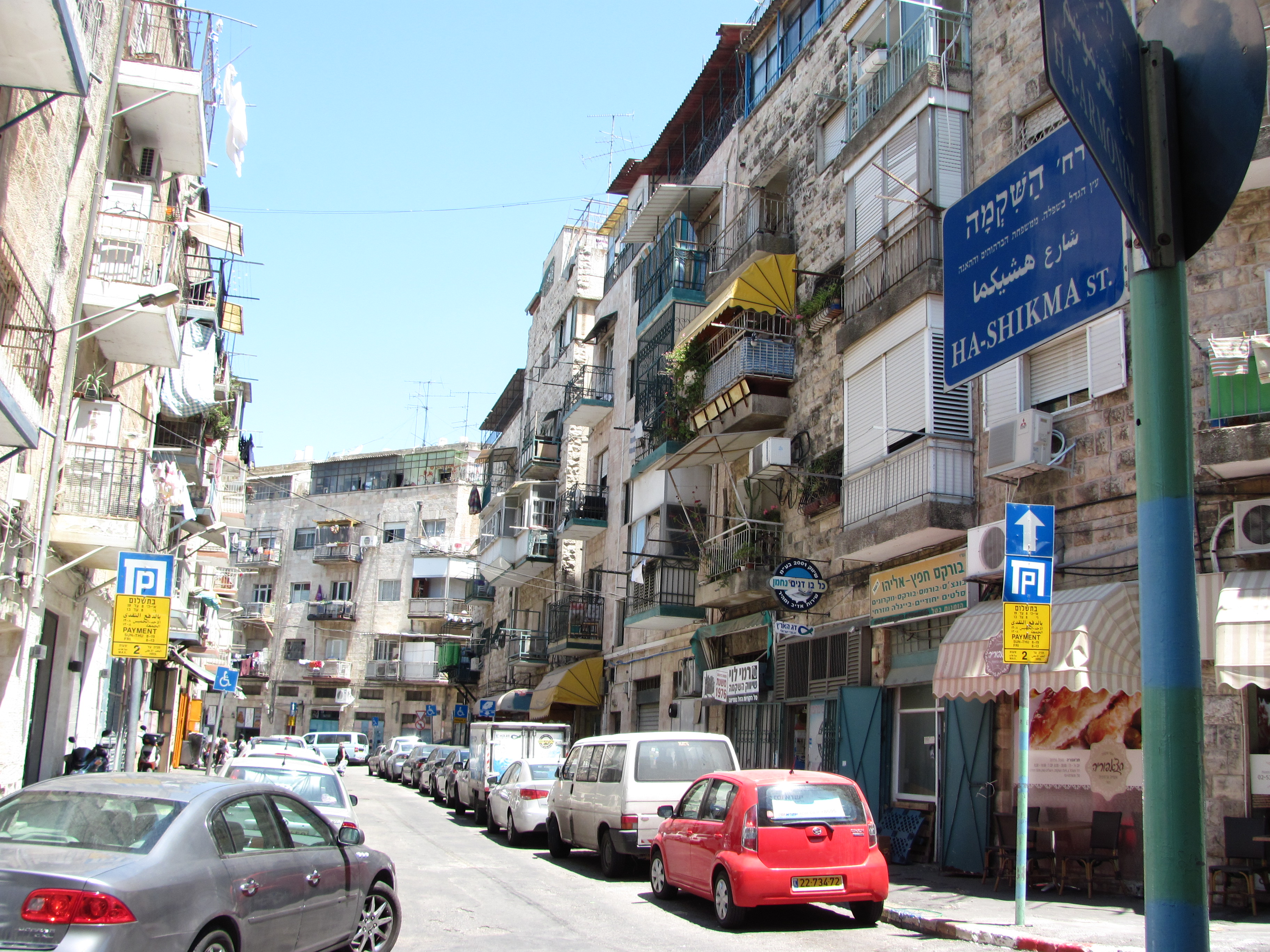
Hashikma Street in the Mahane Yehuda Market district of Jerusalem. Rami Levy's first store is fourth on the right.

Rami Levy Hashikma Marketing was founded by Rami Levy (born 1955, Jerusalem, Israel), one of six children of an Israeli-born father and Iraqi-born mother. He grew up in poverty in a one-room tin shack with a shared kitchen and bathroom in the Nachlaot neighborhood. Shopping with his mother in the nearby Mahane Yehuda Market (the "shuk"), Levy came to the realisation that there were price differentials available to wholesalers, who preferred selling to retailers than dealing with individuals. Upon completing his army service in 1976, he began selling goods at wholesale prices directly to individuals out of a 40 square metres (430 sq ft) stall that his grandfather had left to the family on Hashikma Street, one of the commercial streets of the shuk. He named his new company after himself and the street he was located on.

Levy said he initially bought goods from a wholesaler and sold them at cost. After three months, he bought goods directly from the importer whilst maintaining his wholesale selling prices, thus becoming the first discount store in Israel. In the early 1980s Levy opened his second, 80 square metres (860 sq ft) store. He opened his first supermarket in Talpiot in 1992; he has since opened two other supermarkets in Talpiot to accommodate business.

In May 2007 the company, with eight branches and a market valuation of NIS 430 million, made its initial public stock offering on the Tel Aviv Stock Exchange. Within two years, the number of branches doubled to 16.

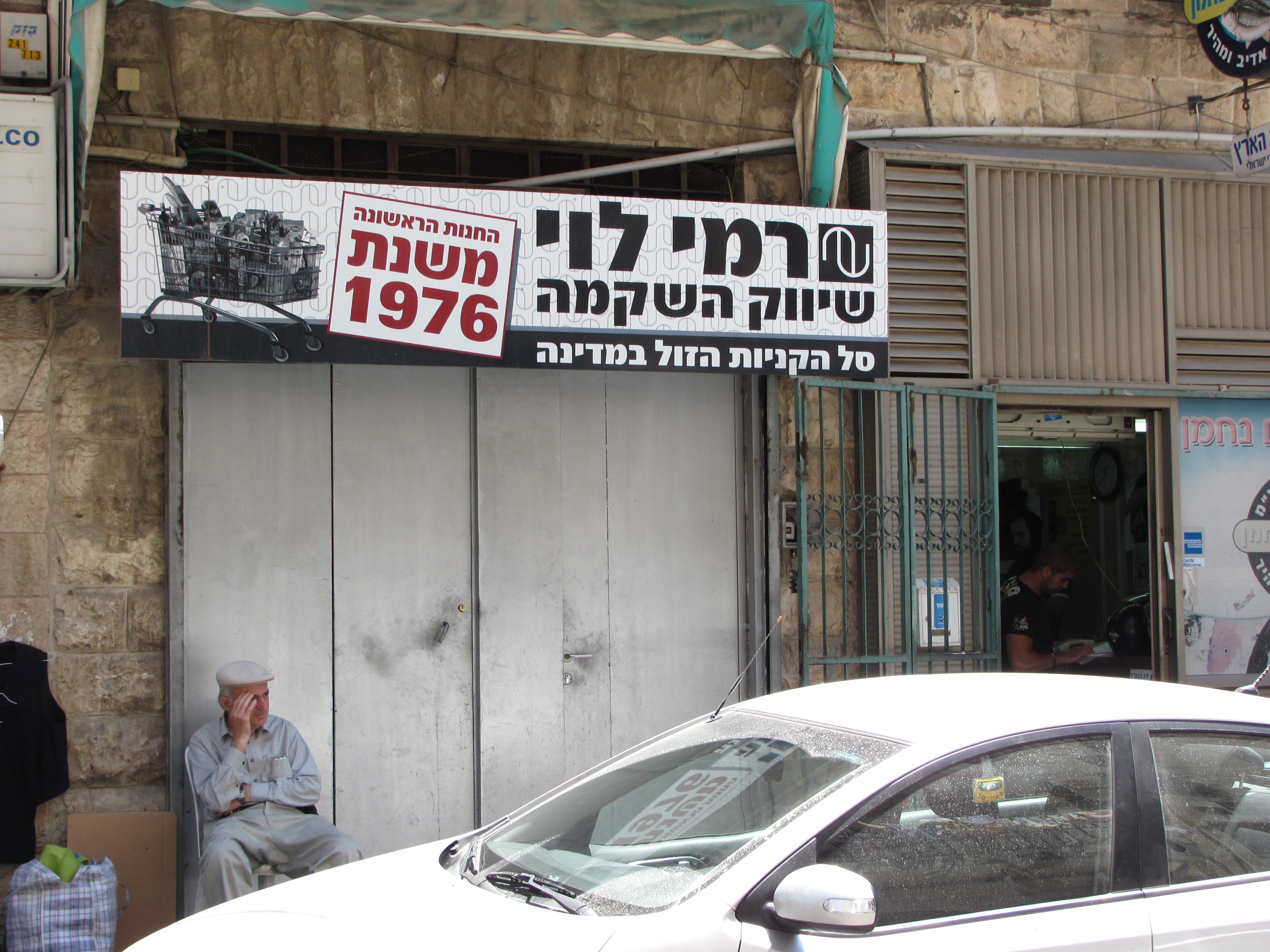
Rami Levy's first store on Hashikma Street.

Rami Levy introduced supermarket price wars to Israel by promoting low prices and discounts in advance of Jewish holidays. For example, for one week in 2008, the chain sold milk for less than the price of water, and drove headline prices of chicken down to 0.79 shekels per kilo. For Rosh Hashanah 2010, it again grabbed headlines by offering chicken, apples and honey at 1 shekel per kilo (13 cents per pound). Similar promotions were carried out for Passover 2011.

In 2009 the chain's discounting policy began to make a dent in the market share of Israel's leading supermarket chains, Shufersal Ltd. and Blue Square-Israel Ltd. Industry analysts attribute the chain's success to Levy's management strategy and marketing skills. Rami Levy Hashikma Marketing stock trades in the TA-75 and TA-100 indexes at a market cap of NIS 1.77 billion (US$474 million)(2011).

== Locations ==
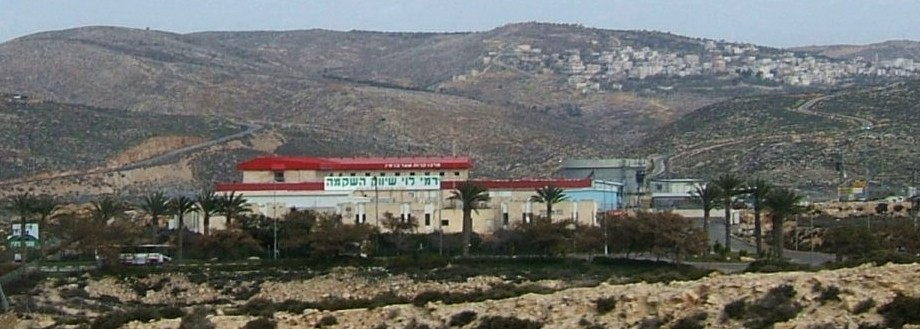
Rami Levy supermarket in Sha'ar Binyamin.

There are currently 44 Rami Levy supermarkets, located in several Jerusalem neighborhoods as well as in Afula, Akko, Ashdod, Ashkelon, Bat Yam, Beersheba, Beit Shemesh, Eilat, Hadera, Haifa, Holon, Kadima, Karmiel, Kastina, Kfar Saba, Kiryat Shmona, Lod, Mevasseret Zion, Modiin, Nesher, Netanya, Nahariya, Pardes Hanna, Petah Tikva, Ra'anana, Ramat Gan, Ramat Hahayal, Rehovot, Rishon LeZion, Rosh HaAyin, Tiberias, Yavne, and Zichron Yaakov. There are also five locations in the West Bank: Beitar Illit, Gush Etzion, Sha'ar Binyamin, Ariel, and Mishor Adumim. Levy's stores in the West Bank are often cited as a model of Arab-Jewish coexistence, as Arabs and Jews shop and work there side-by-side.

In 2010, the locations in West Bank, which attract thousands of Palestinian shoppers and top Palestinian Authority officials, and which are staffed by both Arabs and Jews, were targeted by the PA's anti-Israeli goods campaign. For several months the PA attempted to discourage Arabs from shopping at Rami Levy supermarkets, culminating in an official boycott of the chain in September 2010. At the same time, there were concerns among some Orthodox Jews in the area regarding security and especially the issue of intermixing between the male Arab shelving staff and the female Jewish cashiers. All these issues have been largely put aside by the local populations, as witnessed by the multi-ethnic crowds that fill the stores on any given afternoon.

== Diversification ==
=== In-house brand and outlet stores ===
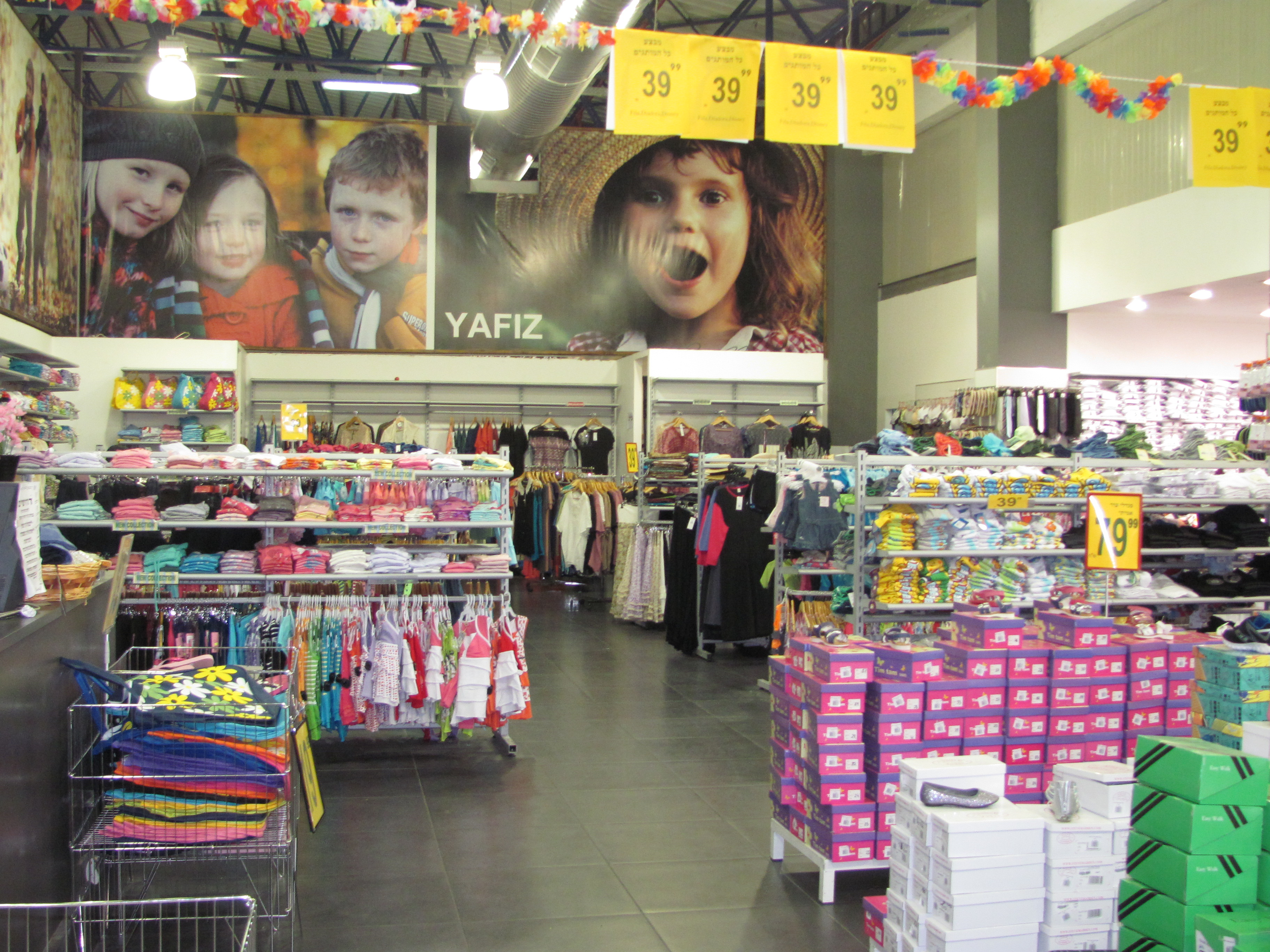
Yafiz clothing store at a Rami Levy supermarket in Givat Shaul, Jerusalem.

Rami Levy Hashikma Marketing markets a house brand called Hamutag (Hebrew: המותג, lit. "the brand"), which includes food, detergents, and toiletries. Some stores have "Pizza Hashikma" and "Burger Hashikma" outlets which sell fast food at a discount. The chain also includes an in-house store called Yafiz which stocks low-priced clothing and shoes for men, women, teens, children and infants.

=== Real estate development ===
In 2000 Rami Levy purchased a plot in the Har Nof neighborhood of Jerusalem zoned for 100 housing units. He also invested 145.5 million NIS (US$36.3 million) in land for 265 apartments in the Holyland complex. In 2008, he bought the rights to SBH Sha'ar L'Yerushalayim for 15 million NIS (US$3.95 million), making him the controlling shareholder of a company that owns land on Hebron Road zoned for 240 housing units, a hotel, and commercial and industrial space. In 2009 he bought Delek Real Estate's share of the Jerusalem Railway Station compound on Derech Beit Lehem (Bethlehem Road) for about 13 million (US$3.6 million); the site is zoned for 1000 housing units. In 2010 Levy partnered with Amikam Ben-Zvi and Housing and Construction Real Estate to buy 13 million NIS (US$3.6 million) worth of land in the Givat HaMatos area in Jerusalem, also zoned for 1000 housing units. However, Levy blames slow progress on developing the company's recent acquisitions on bureaucratic red tape by planning authorities.

In 2011 Levy made headlines with his bid to take over the development of the Nof Zion luxury housing product in the East Jerusalem neighborhood of Jabel Mukaber after developer Digal made a debt settlement with creditors. When the identity of the competing bidder – Palestinian-American businessman Bashar Masri – was announced in the Israeli newspapers, nearly 77 percent of bondholders voted to negotiate with the group of Jewish investors headed by Levy.

Rami Levy Hashikma Marketing owns 65% of the land on which its supermarkets stand, including approximately 35,000 square metres (380,000 sq ft) of land in Mevasseret Zion, Modiin, Gush Etzion, and Pardes Hanna. The company uses its own equity – estimated at NIS 500 million (US$139 million) – for its commercial real estate purchases.

=== Cellular communications ===
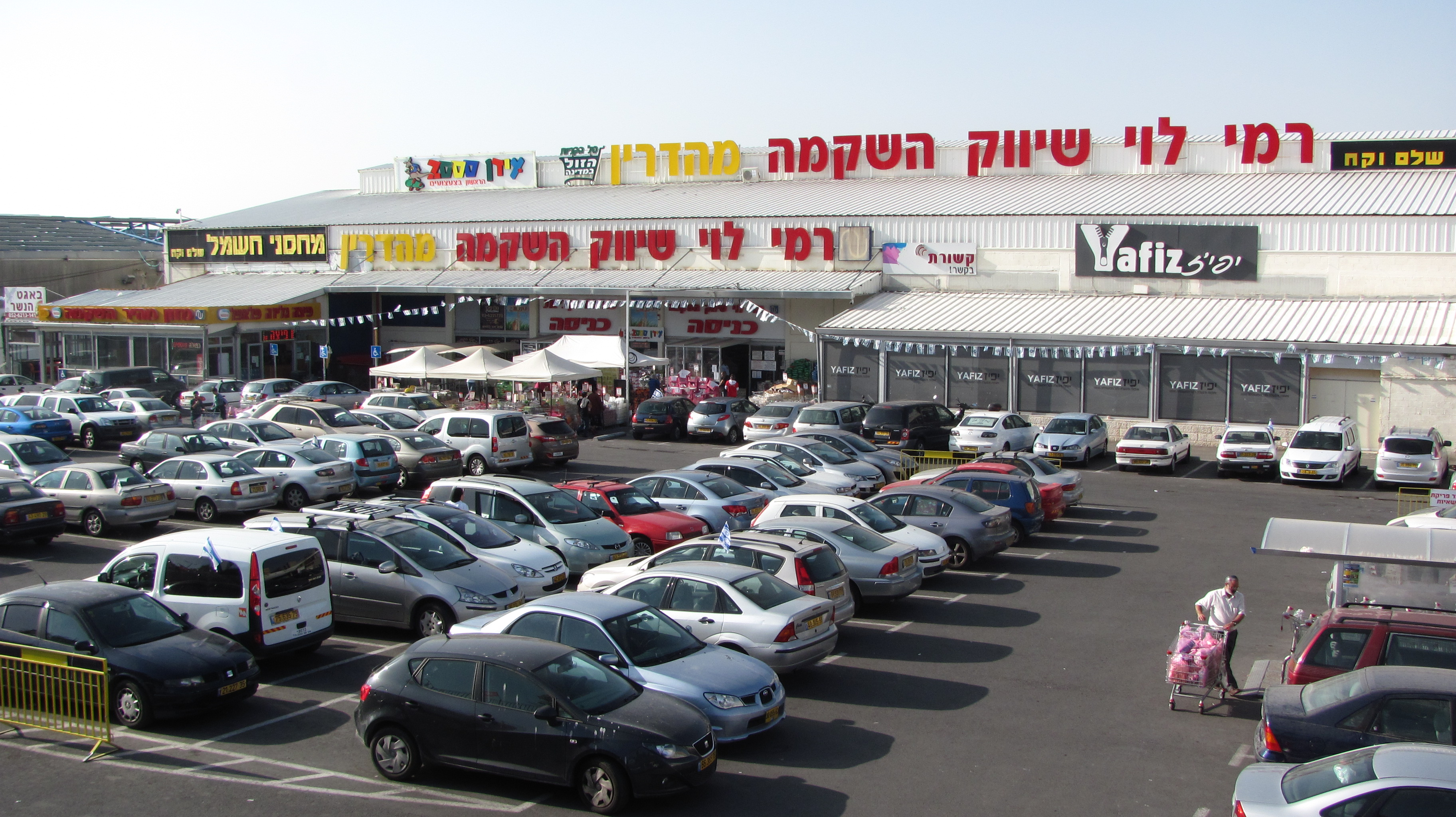
Rami Levy supermarket in Givat Shaul, Jerusalem.

In September 2010 Rami Levy Hashikma Marketing became the fourth company in Israel to receive a mobile virtual network operator license from the Israel Ministry of Communications. The company previously announced in a 2010 statement to the Tel Aviv Stock Exchange that upon receiving this license, it would open a new subsidiary, Rami Levy Hashikma Marketing Communications Ltd., and sell advanced mobile telephone services in its supermarkets. In February 2011 Rami Levy signed an agreement with Israeli mobile phone provider Pelephone, allowing the supermarket chain to use Pelephone's infrastructure to provide cellular phone services. In December 2011 Rami Levy Communications went live with the opening of two branches in Jerusalem. Rami Levy Communications is the first MVNO to buy blocks of minutes from other cellular companies and resell them to consumers for less than the providing company charges.

== Criticism ==
=== Involvement in Israeli settlements ===
On 12 February 2020, the United Nations published a database of companies doing business related in the West Bank, including East Jerusalem, as well as in the Golan Heights. Rami Levy Hashikma Marketing was listed on the database on account of its activities in Israeli settlements in these occupied territories, which are considered illegal under international law.

=== Nepotism ===
Levy employs 20 family members in his business, including his wife, Chief Financial Officer Adina Levy, and Vice President of Operations Shmulik Levy, and many of the stores are managed by relatives.

== See also ==
- Hatzi Hinam
- Shufersal
- Economy of Israel
