= Triveni Supermarkets =

Indian chain of retail supermarkets

Triveni Supermarkets is a chain of retail supermarkets operating in the co-operative sector headquartered in Trivandrum, Kerala, India. This system is operated by the Kerala State Co-operative Consumers Federation Limited, which is at large controlled by the Government of Kerala. Hence this chain is in principle used as a form of governmental intervention in the retail market in the state to control and limit retail prices. As of 2017, there are a total of 229 outlets throughout the state, including some mobile, floating supermarkets, coffeehouses and a noon meal scheme.
