= Shufersal =

Israeli supermarket chain

Shufersal Ltd.

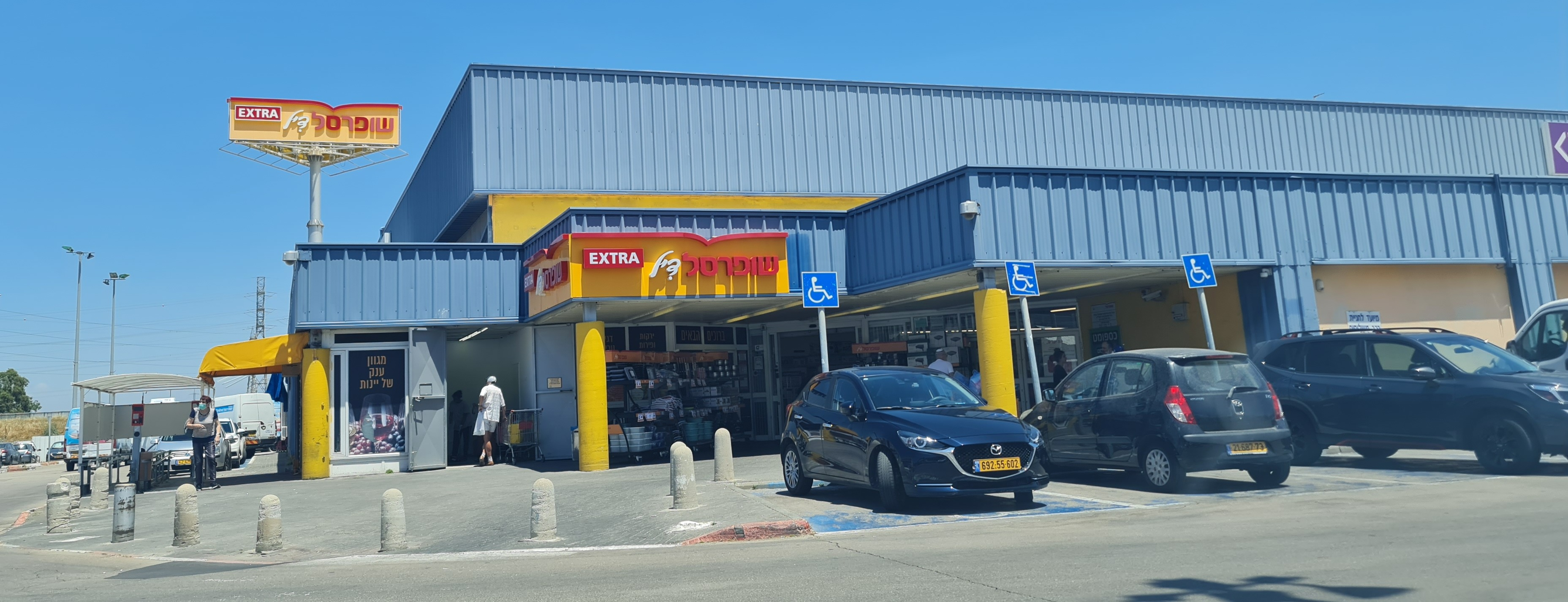
- Type: Public company
- Traded as: TASE: SAE
- Industry: Retailing
- Founded: 1958; 68 years ago
- Headquarters: Rishon LeZion, Israel
- Number of locations: 425
- Key people: Yosef Amir and Shlomo Amir (Co-CEO)
- Revenue: ▲ ₪ 13.36 billion (2019)
- Operating income: ▲ ₪ 707million (2023)
- Net income: ▲ ₪ 323million (2023)
- Owner: Public Company
- Number of employees: 15,500
- Website: www.shufersal.co.il

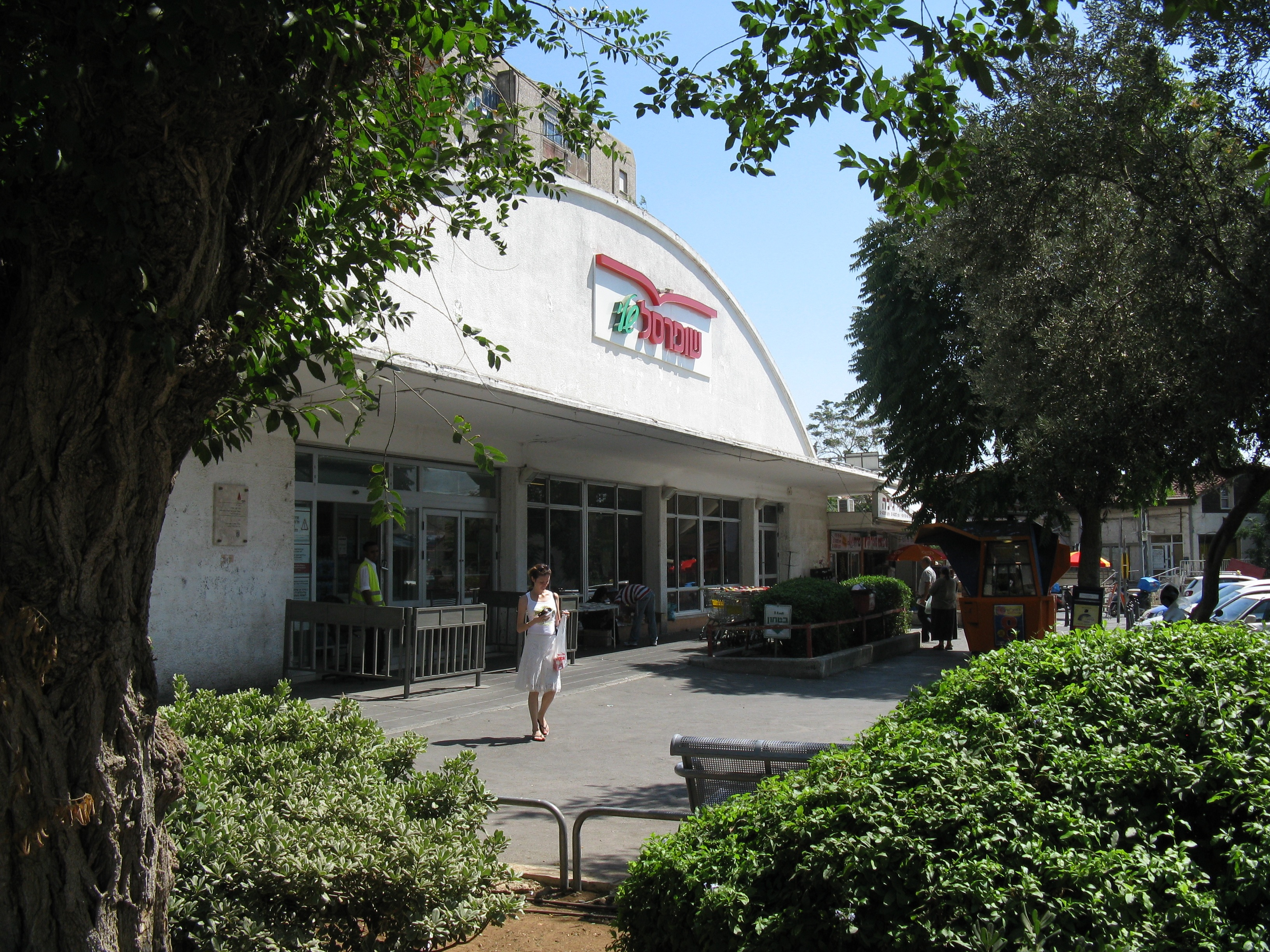
Shufersal in Kiryat HaYovel, Jerusalem

Shufersal (Hebrew: שופרסל), formerly Super-Sol in English and Shufra-Sal in Hebrew, commonly known as Super-sal, is the largest supermarket chain in Israel, with a 20% market share (as of 2018). The company, which was established in 1958, was the first to implement the American supermarket model in Israel.

As of 2024, Shufersal had 316 stores in total, and 96 branches of Be Drugstores Ltd. The company employs 15,500 employees. It also engages in commercial real estate.

Shufersal shares are traded on the Tel Aviv Stock Exchange, and it is a constituent of the TA-125 Index.

== History ==
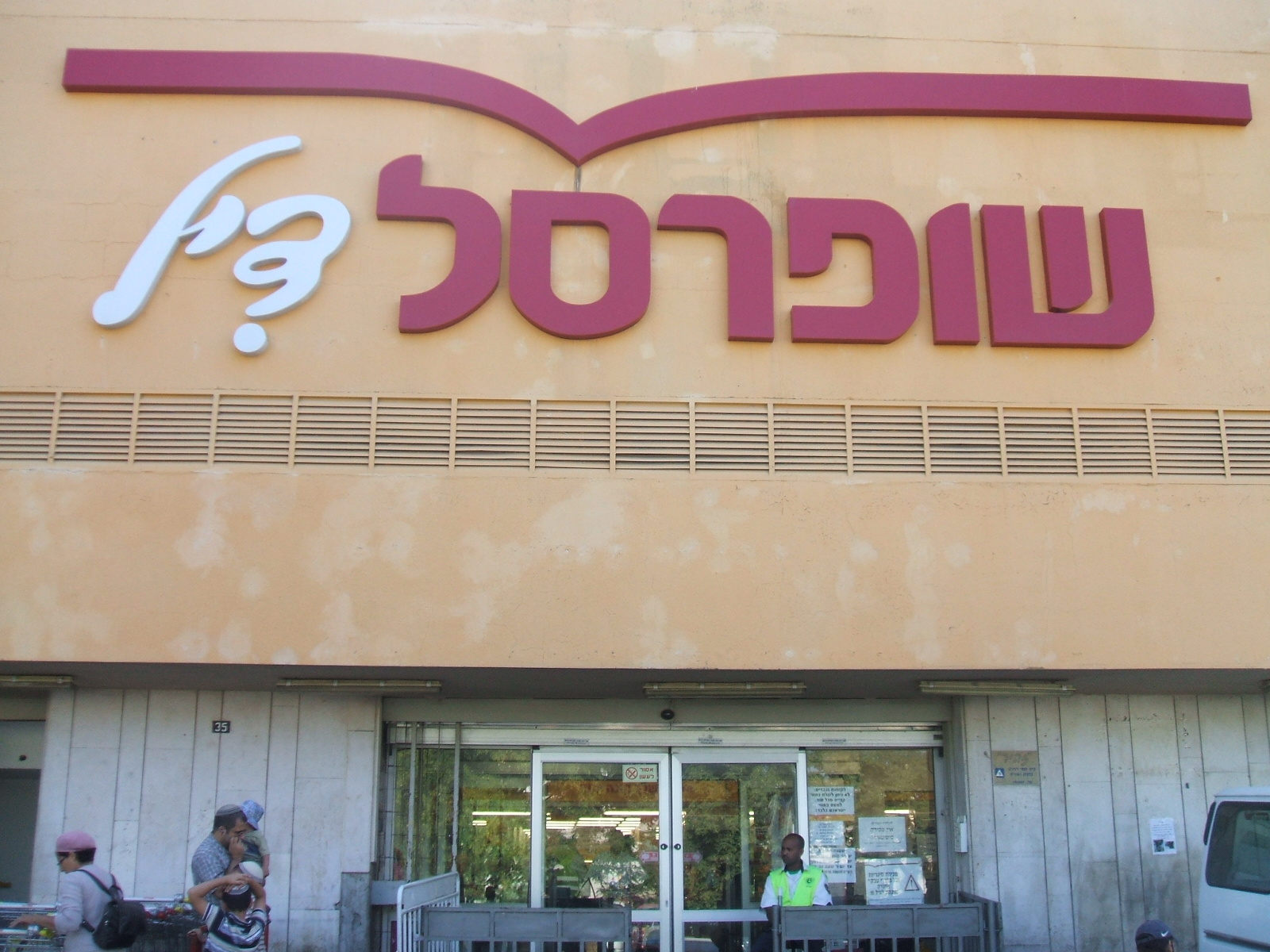
Shufersal Deal store in Talpiot, Jerusalem

Shufersal was founded in 1958 by a group of grocers from Detroit, Michigan. Nate Lurie of Southfield, Michigan was a co-Founder and served as the first Chairman of the Board. The name was originally a portmanteau of the Aramaic *shufra* שופרא, meaning "premium" and *sal* סל, Hebrew for "basket". In 2005, the company implemented a strategic growth plan, creating three supermarket categories: "Shufersal Deal", "Shufersal Big", and "Shufersal Sheli".

In early 2006, Shufersal purchased the third-largest retail chain in Israel, Clubmarket. In October 2006, the chain launched the Shufersal Credit Card. Sales turnover for the chain in 2007 totaled NIS 9,935 million.

In 2009 it launched a subsidiary, Yesh, targeting the Haredi market. Features of Yesh stores include products marketed to larger families, lower prices, stricter kashrut standards, and in some stores, separate hours for men and women In 2009, Shufersal was threatened with an antitrust suit for the purchase of Clubmarket.

On March 5 2023, Shufersal entered a partnership with the Dutch-French multinational retailer Spar to open at least 10 SPAR stores in Israel over the next three years as well as a monopoly on selling Spar-branded products in Israel. In September 2023, Shufersal announced that it had decided to withdraw from the deal due to restrictions by the Competition Authority.

In 2024, Shlomi and Yossi Amir have become the new controlling shareholders of Shufersal. They purchased of a 24.99% stake in Israel's biggest supermarket chain for NIS 1.5 billion from a range of institutional investors.

== Shufersal label ==
Shufersals sells more than 1,300 store brand products in its stores.

== Services ==
Shufersal also markets its products through a computerized telephone marketing center for shopping by phone, fax, or the internet.

== See also ==
- Hatzi Hinam
- Rami Levy Hashikma Marketing
- List of companies operating in West Bank settlements
