= Hatzi Hinam =

Supermarket chain in Israel

- Company type: Private Company
- Industry: Retail, Supermarket
- Founded: 1990; 36 years ago
- Headquarters: Holon
- Website: https://shop.hazi-hinam.co.il

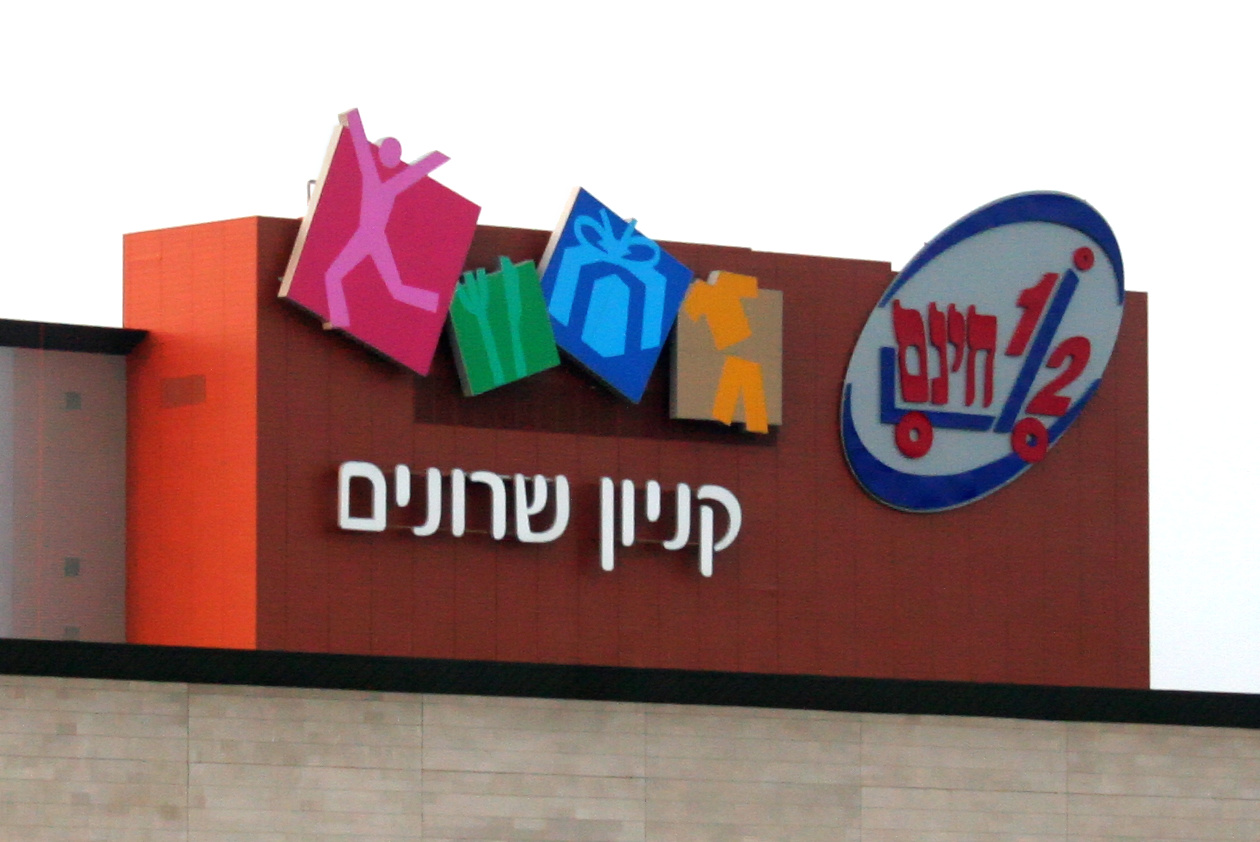
Hatzi Hinam Kanyon Sharonim complex, rear view approaching from the south.

Hatzi Hinam or Hetzi Hinam (Hebrew: חצי חינם, lit. half-free, from בחצי חינם, "very cheaply") is a supermarket chain in Israel. Founded in the early 1990s, the regional independent supermarket chain is headquartered in Holon, and has seven stores in the Gush Dan area. Hatzi Hinam is the tenth largest supermarket chain in Israel by revenue, with a market share of over 5% but has significantly fewer stores than the two major Israeli chains. In 2004, the company had an estimated NIS1.1 billion in sales and was confirmed the largest independent supermarket chain. Cousins Zaki Shalom and Mordechai Kuperly share ownership (67%/33%) of the chain.

The Binyamina Winery, Israel's fourth largest winery, was purchased in August 2008 by the owners of Hatzi Hinam for US$13.5 million.

In March 2009, the company acquired Vita Pri Galil for 105 million ILS, saved it from bankruptcy, and promised to hire an additional 100 employees.

In September 2010, Hatzi Hinam opened a 27,000-square metre store in Hod HaSharon.

== Locations ==
City	Total stores
Rishon LeZion	3
Holon	2
Petah Tikva	1
Hod HaSharon	1
