= List of supermarket chains in China =

This is a list of supermarket chains in China.

== Current supermarket chains ==
=== China (Mainland) ===
- ÆON (Japanese)
- Aldi (Aldi Süd, German)
- Auchan (French)
- RT-Mart 大润发 (Taiwanese)
- Walmart (American)
- Sam's Club 山姆会员商店 (American)
- Tesco (British)
- MaiDeLong (ex Metro AG) Màidélóng 麦德龙 (麥德龍)
- Subsidiaries of China Resources, including:
  - CR Vanguard
  - Ole'
  - blt
  - Suguo
- Subsidiaries of AS Watson, including:
  - PARKnSHOP
  - Taste
- CitySuper
- Fresh Hippo / Hémǎ / 盒马
- Lianhua Supermarket/BHG
- Lotte Mart (Korean)
- Lotus Supermarket
- Wumart 物美
- Fulande
- Jingkelong
- Baozhen (Guarantee) in Hainan
- Fields
- CityShop
- Parkson
- Freshmart
- Ito Yokado (known as Huatang in Mandarin)
- Bai Hua Bai Huo 百花百货
- Feidan
- Pines
- Jenny Lou's
- Epermarket
- Yonghui 永辉超市

=== Hong Kong ===
- Subsidiaries of China Resources, including:
  - U Select
- Subsidiaries of AS Watson, including:
  - PARKnSHOP
  - Fusion
  - Taste
  - International by PARKnSHOP
  - Gourmet
  - Great
  - Food le Parc
- Subsidiaries of DFI Retail Group, including:
  - Wellcome
  - Market Place/Market Place by Jasons
  - 3hreeSixty
  - Oliver's The Delicatessen
- CitySuper
- ÆON (Japanese)
- Yata (Subsidiary of SHKP)
- UNY (Japanese)

=== Macau ===
- San Miu
- Royal
- Seng Cheong
- Sunsco

== Defunct supermarket chains ==
=== China (Mainland) ===
- Shoulian
- Trust Mart
- Baolongcang
- Metro Cash and Carry (German)
- Great (Subsidiary of AS Watson)
- Carrefour (French)

=== Hong Kong ===
- Carrefour (French)
- CR Vanguard (Subsidiary of China Resources Group)
- Jason's Food & Living/Jasons Ichiba (Subsidiary of DFI Retail Group)
- Guangnan KK
- needs (Subsidiary of New World Department Store China)
- Walmart (American)
