= Electronic Payment Services =

Largest electronic payment system in Hong Kong, Macau and Shenzhen

Electronic Payment Services EPS
- Operating area: Hong Kong
- Members: 21
- Founded: 1984
- Owner: EPS Company (Hong Kong) Limited
- Website: www.eps.com.hk/eng/

Electronic Payment Services
- Traditional Chinese: 易辦事
- Simplified Chinese: 易办事
- Jyutping: ji6 baan6 si6
Transcriptions
Standard Mandarin
- Hanyu Pinyin: Yì bànshì
Yue: Cantonese
- Jyutping: ji6 baan6 si6

Electronic Payment Services (Chinese: 易辦事), commonly known as EPS, is an electronic payment system based in Hong Kong, Macau, and with limited acceptance in Shenzhen since it began operations in 1985. The service is provided by EPS Company (Hong Kong) Limited which currently has over 30,000 acceptance locations.

== System ==
In each retail location, a terminal is installed and is usually connected to the POS system of the retailer. The terminal may also be independently connected to banks through the public phone system.

Transactions approved before the cut-off time are batched into a payment made directly to the retailer's account by the end of the business day.

== Service ==
=== ATM card payment ===
EPS entails the simple use of an ATM card or a credit card with ATM capability issued by a member bank of the EPS, acting as a debit card. No application for the service is required.

The EPS device is a dual-unit device consisting of a removable card processor and a stationary base that serves as a charger and data link. Some retailers may use an integrated machine. In such situations, the customer inserts the card into the machine directly and waits for the retailer's acknowledgement before proceeding to the rest of the steps.

=== EasyCash service ===
EasyCash (Chinese: 提款易) allows card holders to withdraw cash at over 1,200 locations in Hong Kong upon a regular purchase by EPS. The cash withdrawal amount must be in units of $100, up to $500. EPS EasyCash service is a kind of cashback service.

EPS EasyCash service is available at Hong Kong–based chain stores such as Gourmet, Great, IKEA, Mannings, MarketPlace, Massimo Dutti, Circle K, Oliver's, Parknshop, Taste, ThreeSixty, Vango, China Resources Vanguard (CRV), V'ole and Wellcome.

=== PPS ===
PPS (Chinese: 繳費靈) is a service which allows card holders to pay bills using the phone or the internet. To use the service, the card holder must swipe the ATM card or the credit card with ATM capability through a PPS terminal to create an account. Afterwards, the account may be used to pay bills either through the PPS hotline, website or the mobile application.

== Members ==
- Bank of China (Hong Kong) Limited
- Bank of Communications, HK Branch
- China Construction Bank (Asia)
- China Merchants Bank Company Limited
- Chiyu Banking Corporation Limited
- Chong Hing Bank Limited
- Citibank (Hong Kong) Limited
- China CITIC Bank International Limited
- Dah Sing Bank Limited
- DBS Bank (Hong Kong) Limited
- Fubon Bank (Hong Kong) Limited
- Hang Seng Bank Limited
- The Hongkong and Shanghai Banking Corporation (HSBC)
- ICBC (Asia)
- Mevas Bank Limited
- Nanyang Commercial Bank Limited
- Shanghai Commercial Bank Limited
- Standard Chartered Bank (Hong Kong) Limited
- The Bank of East Asia Limited
- OCBC Wing Hang Bank Limited
- CMB Wing Lung Bank Limited

== See also ==
- Payment by Phone Service (PPS)
- Octopus card
- Credit card
- Economy of Hong Kong
