= List of supermarket chains in Indonesia =

This is a list of supermarket chains in Indonesia.

== Current supermarket chains ==
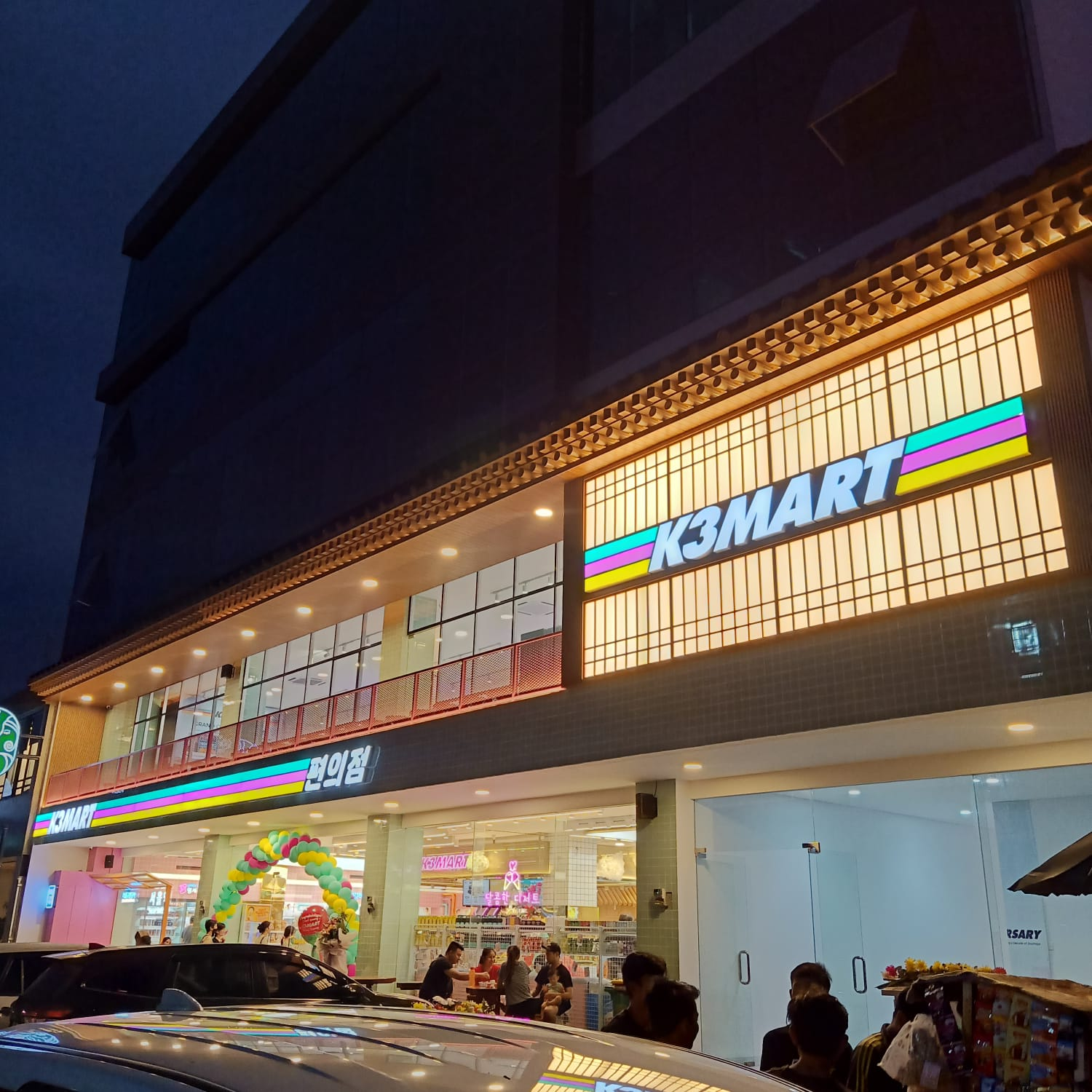
A K3Mart super store in Gading Serpong, Indonesia

- Ada Supermarket
- ÆON
- Ranch Market (name licensed from 99 Ranch Market)
  - Farmers Market
- The Foodhall (formerly Sogo Supermarket)
- Hero
- Lotte Mart (formerly Makro)
  - Lotte Grosir
- Hypermart
- Super Indo
- Transmart (formerly Carrefour)

== Defunct supermarket chains ==
- Carrefour (taken over by Transmart)
- Makro (taken over by Lotte Mart)
- Centro Department Store
- Metro
- Giant
- LuLu Hypermarket
- Sogo Supermarket (taken over by The Foodhall)
- SPAR
- Walmart
