= Greeners Action =

Green Student Council
- 綠色學生聯會
- Founded: August 1993
- Location: Hong Kong, China
- Members: Student volunteers
- Key people: Angus Ho (current chairperson)
- Affiliations: Non-governmental organisation
- Website: www.greeners-action.org

Greeners Action (Chinese: 綠領行動), previously known as the Green Student Council (Chinese: 綠色學生聯會) is a non-profit organisation concerning local environmental problems that was founded in August 1993, in Hong Kong, China. Members include accountants, teachers and lawyers, as well as university students.

== History ==
Greeners Action is a charitable organisation founded in 1993. It previously was known as Green Student Council. In 2013, the organisation started the "Food Sharing Program" (Chinese: 食物分享計劃) in which they gathered leftover food from sellers to give to office workers six times each week. They amassed around 145 to 175 kg (320 to 386 lb) of food which they distributed to around 100 individuals. They gathered vegetables from street vendors as well as pastries from bakeries each evening.

The group has engaged in activism against plastic bags. It advocated in 2004 for a HK$0.50 tax on plastic bags used by consumers at retailers. Greeners Action started No Plastic Bag Day in April 2006 and held a commemoration every month. As part of the effort, the association collaborated with the Hong Kong authorities and stores to minimize Hong Kong shoppers' reliance on plastic bags. 36 supermarket chains took part in the initiative including China Resources Vanguard and Wellcome. The Environmental Protection Department said in November 2006 that between when the initiative started and the present day, the three top supermarket chains had used between 24% to 29% fewer plastic bags. The organisation started a pilot program in 2007 where it made monthly distributions to wet market vendors of 250 kg (550 lb) of dried weed. Their aim was to have the vendors use the dried weed to package their products in place of plastic bags.
