= Ada Supermarket =

Indonesian supermarket chain

PT Ada Perkasa Sahitaguna
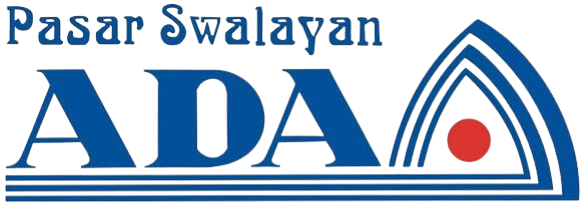
- Trade name: ADA Swalayan/Pasar Swalayan ADA
- Company type: Private Company
- Industry: Retail
- Headquarters: Semarang, Central Java, Indonesia
- Number of locations: 7 (2024)

Ada Supermarket is an Indonesian supermarket chain based in Semarang, Central Java, and owned by PT Ada Perkasa Sahitaguna. The company was founded in 1987 by Gunawan Santoso (Tan Khoen Toan), and is currently ran by his Daughter Erika Santoso. Ada Swalayan sells a variety of household needs, clothing, shoes and toys, and some outlets also have a food court.

As of 2024, the company operates 7 outlets across Central Java and West Java.

== See also ==
- List of supermarket chains in Indonesia
- Giant Hypermarket
- Lotte Mart
