= Cold Storage (supermarket) =

Singaporean multinational supermarket company

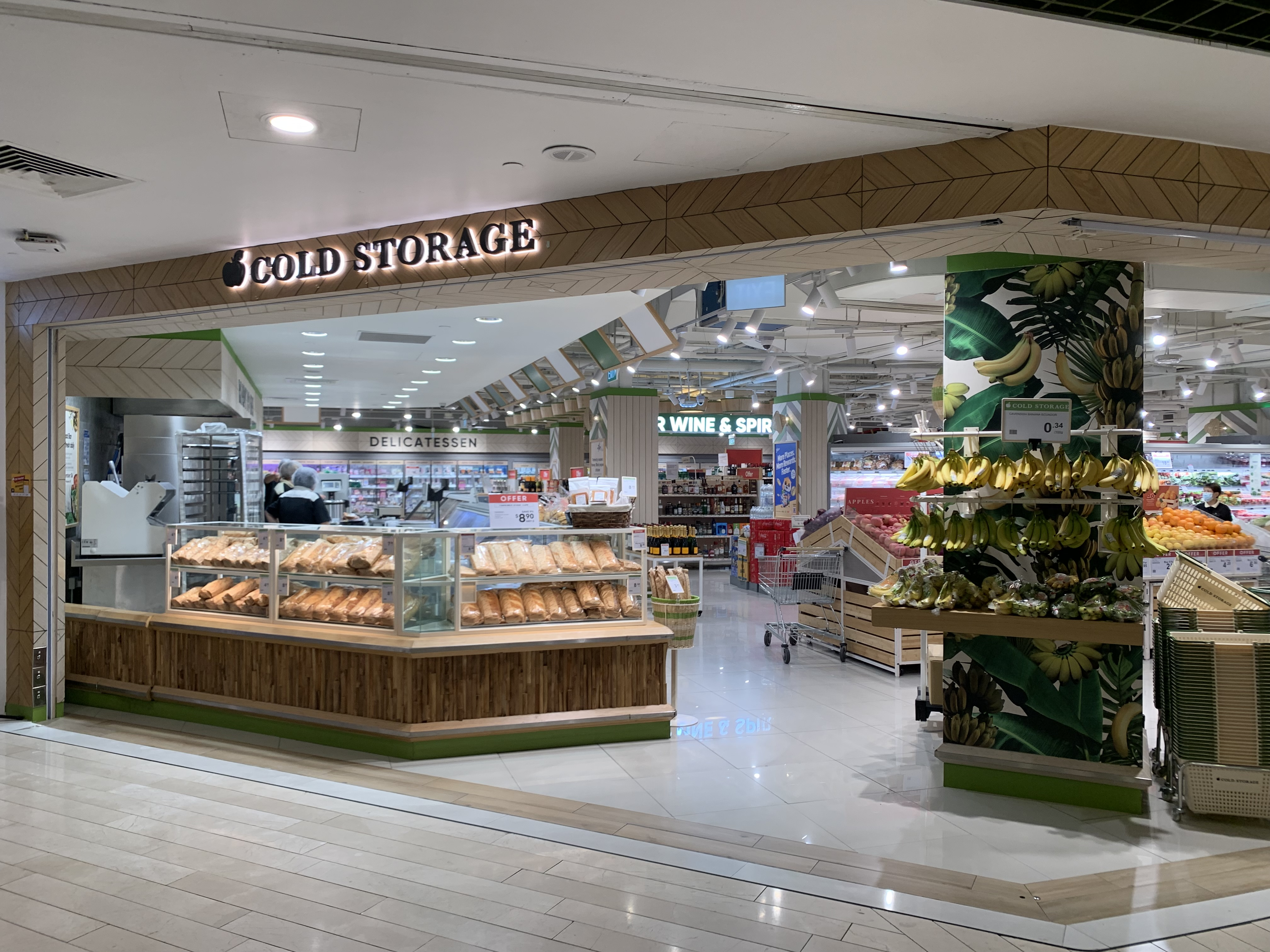
- A Cold Storage outlet in Queenstown, Singapore
- Type: Private (1903–1992); Subsidiary (1992–)
- Industry: Retail
- Founded: 3 June 1903; 123 years ago in Singapore
- Headquarters: 21 Tampines North Drive 2 #03-01 Singapore 528765
- Area served: Asia-Pacific
- Products: Grocery Stores, No Frills Supermarkets
- Parent: DFI Retail Group (1992–2025); Macrovalue (2025–)
- Website: coldstorage.com.sg

Cold Storage is a Singaporean multinational supermarket company. Its parent company also operates Market Place stores, now branded as Cold Storage Fresh, as well as the Giant hypermarket brand, and has various other supermarkets around Asia including Hero and Wellcome.

Founded in 1903 as the Singapore Cold Storage Company, Cold Storage was one of the first supermarkets in Singapore to offer its merchandise online in 1997. The number of regular customers has since grown from 6,000 in 1998, to more than 15,000 in 2012. In 1992, DFI purchased the company. It was sold to Macrovalue in 2025.

SGS has awarded a HACCP certification to Cold Storage, for its quality and integrity in food safety. As of 2025, Cold Storage operates 45 stores in Singapore across the country.

== History ==
=== Early years ===
Established in 1903 in Singapore, Cold Storage started as a small depot storing and selling mainly frozen meat. Cold Storage was then known as the Singapore Cold Storage Company, and was the main manufacturer of ice in Singapore. Taking advantage of the booming ice manufacturing and refrigeration business, Cold Storage ventured into the ice cream business. In 1923, a small factory was set up at the Borneo Wharf of the Harbourfront district to manufacture ice cream under the Paradise brand.

In its early days, the company's primary concern was to have a quick and profitable turnover of its imported meats and range of products. Cold Storage later shifted from counter-service to self-service, introducing the supermarket to Singapore.

=== Tropical dairy farm ===
In 1937, Cold Storage founded the world's first tropical dairy farm at the Bukit Timah district of Singapore, which aimed to produce fresh pasteurised milk. This farm, then known as the Singapore Dairy Farm, was situated inside what is now the Bukit Timah Nature Reserve. It kept as many as 800 cows. Pasteurised milk produced at the farm was packaged in pyramid-shaped cartons and sold under the brand Magnolia. By 1974, the farm was planned to be redeveloped into a residential area.

Cold Storage is the Singapore's oldest established supermarket operator. It was the first supermarket in Singapore to receive the CaseTrust Mark introduced by the Consumer Association of Singapore (CASE) in 1998 which identifies companies that receive a high degree of consumer confidence. It was also the first supermarket in Singapore to receive MUIS certification for its supermarket operations at Causeway Point in Woodlands, thus providing Muslims with the assurance of Halal purchases.

=== Recent years ===
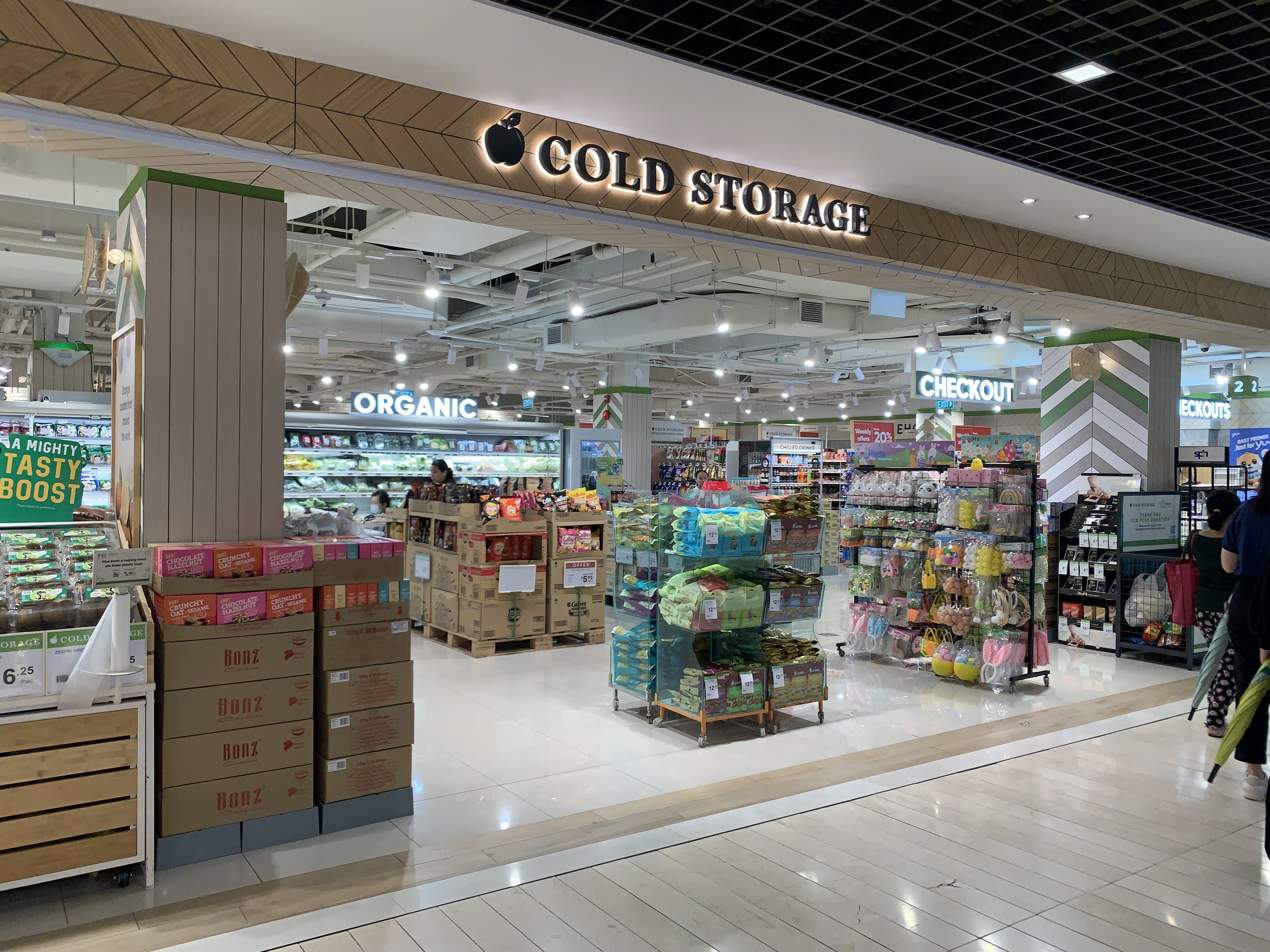
A Cold Storage in Queenstown, Singapore

In 1973, Cold Storage's Pasaraya Malaysia, a joint venture of Cold Storage's subsidiary Supermarkets Malaysia and "Malaysian interests" was responsible for the construction of Jaya Supermarket in Petaling Jaya, set to be completed in April 1974.

In 1985, Cold Storage Malaysia opened its first Majik Market store in Bangsar Baru, Kuala Lumpur, It operated under a franchise from Mumford Inc of Atlanta, USA, which complements its existing Jaya Supermarket chain but differ in concept and management. Due to competition from 7-Eleven, whose Malaysian franchise was then operated by the Antah Holdings group, Cold Storage Malaysia phased out Majik Market as part of its streamlining process.

Cold Storage Malaysia, along with Peremba, Gaya Timur and Jusco were responsible for the initial version of Jaya Jusco "superstores" in 1985, with three stores in Dayabumi, Taman Tun Dr Ismail and Subang Jaya.

In 1987, Cold Storage Malaysia, which had been through a difficult financial phase in the previous three years, had a change in management with some senior executives leaving.

In 1992, DFI Retail Group purchased the company, although no major changes were made to the Cold Storage brand.

Cold Storage started the Fresh Food Distribution Centre in Singapore in 1999, a composite multi-temperature warehousing for fresh and frozen food distribution.

In 2023, DFI Retail Group divested its Malaysian food retailing business (including Cold Storage brand in that country) to Macrovalue Sdn Bhd.

In 2025, DFI Retail Group sold the Singaporean food retailing business (including Cold Storage brand) to Macrovalue Pte Ltd.

In August 2026, Cold Storage launched Cold Storage On The Go, a convenience store format, at an Esso station on East Coast Road. The company planned to introduce the format at all 58 Esso stations in Singapore during 2026, replacing FairPrice Group's convenience stores.

== Brands ==
=== Private labels ===
Cold Storage supermarkets sell products from DFI's Meadows and Yu Pin King private labels.

=== Cold Storage Fresh and Mercató ===
Cold Storage Fresh (formerly Market Place, Jasons and Jasons Deli) in Singapore, Mercató was formerly known as Jasons Food Hall and had started business in 1975. Now, It operates five stores in Singapore.

=== Giant ===
Giant, a subsidiary of Cold Storage, is one of the largest players of the retail industry in Singapore as well as in Malaysia, having over 85 branches spread throughout the country. It was founded by the Teng family in 1944. Prices at Giant are significantly cheaper than at Cold Storage.

=== Shop N Save ===
Dairy Farm Singapore acquired Shop N Save in 2003, 35 stores from QAF and Belgian retailer, Delhaize.

It was a former discount supermarket chain in Singapore, operating 50 stores located across the island in HDB estates and suburban malls. It sells a range of cheap products and fresh food. In 2013, it was merged with Giant.
