= Cashrewards =

Australian cashback reward program

- Type: Private
- Industry: E-commerce, loyalty programs, retailing
- Founded: 2014
- Founders: Andrew Clarke; Lorica Clarke
- Headquarters: Sydney, New South Wales, Australia
- Area served: Australia
- Key people: Anthony Seymour-Walsh (CEO)
- Services: Cashback
- Members: ▲2.5 million (2025)
- Parent: 1835i
- Website: www.cashrewards.com.au

Cashrewards was an Australian cashback website. The company had over two million members and more than 2,000 partners including Apple, Amazon, Myer, Liquorland, Adidas, Bonds, Target, Booking.com and The Iconic.

== History ==
Cashrewards was founded in 2014 by Andrew and Lorica Clarke. The company was bootstrapped for four years before it received $5.25 million in debt funding in April 2018.

In 2018, Cashrewards launched its In Store Offers platform, with Visa Inc. The platform allows members with a Visa credit card or debit card to earn cashback at hundreds of stores in Australia.

In June 2019, the company raised $5.2 million in Series A funding and announced plans for an initial public offering (IPO) by 2020. In October of that year allowed users of In Store Offers to use Mastercard to access cashback from participating retailers.

In July 2021, Cashrewards and ANZ launched Cashrewards Max. Exclusive to ANZ credit and debit card users, Cashrewards Max members received higher cashback offers from participating sellers.

In January 2022, the remaining stake in Cashrewards was acquired from a group of shareholders by 1835i, ANZ's external innovation and venture capital partner. On 30 September 2022, the Cashrewards Max program was retired. In November 2022, ANZ added a feature to their app that allows access to Cashrewards' cashback from it.

In October 2023, Cashrewards launched Circuit, its retail media offering. In August 2024, Cashrewards acquired Little Birdie, a product search and real-time price tracking platform. The company planned to integrate Little Birdie with its Cashrewards platform.

On 8 September 2025, Cashrewards announced it was shutting down and ceased making offers available on its website, app and browser extension. Customers were given until 12 December 2025 to withdraw funds. The Australian Financial Review reported that "Cashrewards was failing to meet ANZ’s expectations".

== Philanthropy ==
In 2017, Cashrewards joined the Salesforce charity initiative "Pledge 1%". Cashrewards was founded by the Clarkes after their child survived a serious illness, so they chose the Starlight Children's Foundation, due to the support the organisation provided to their child during the illness. They pledged to match 1% of all cashback that their members withdraw and donate it to the Foundation. By February 2024, the company had donated more than $2 million to the charity.

== Awards and recognition ==
Year	Category	Institution or publication	Result	Notes	Ref.
2016	Finalist: Best Fintech Startup	StartCon	Nominated	Australasian Startup Awards 2016	
2016	Deloitte Tech Fast 50 Awards Australia	Deloitte	Won	Deloitte Technology Fast 500 2016	
2017	Finalist: E-commerce Company of the Year	StartCon	Nominated	Australasian Startup Awards 2017	
2017	Finalist: NSW Region	Telstra	Nominated	Telstra Business Awards 2017	
2017	Finalist: Eastern Region	Ernst & Young (EY)	Nominated	Ernst & Young Entrepreneur Of The Year Award 2017	
2017	Smart50 List (4th Place)	SmartCompany	Won	Smart50 Awards 2017	
2017	Finalist: Corporate Social Responsibility Program of the Year	Optus & MyBusiness	Nominated	Optus My Business Awards 2017	
2017	Media, Marketing and Advertising Business of the Year	Optus & MyBusiness	Won	Optus My Business Awards 2017	
2017	Finalist: Deloitte Tech Fast 50 Awards Australia	Deloitte	Nominated	Deloitte Technology Fast 500 2017	
2017	Businesses of Tomorrow Award	Westpac	Won	Westpac Businesses of Tomorrow 2017	
2018	Fast 100 List (6th Place)	The Australian Financial Review	Won	Financial Review Fast 100 2018	
2018	Nora Best Loyalty Marketing	Nora	Won	Nora Solution Partner Awards	
