= Wellcome =

Hong Kong supermarket chain

- Native name: 惠康
- Type: Supermarket
- Industry: Retailing
- Founded: 1945; 81 years ago
- Headquarters: Hong Kong
- Number of locations: 280 (Hong Kong)
- Area served: Hong Kong
- Parent: DFI Retail Group
- Website: wellcome.com.hk

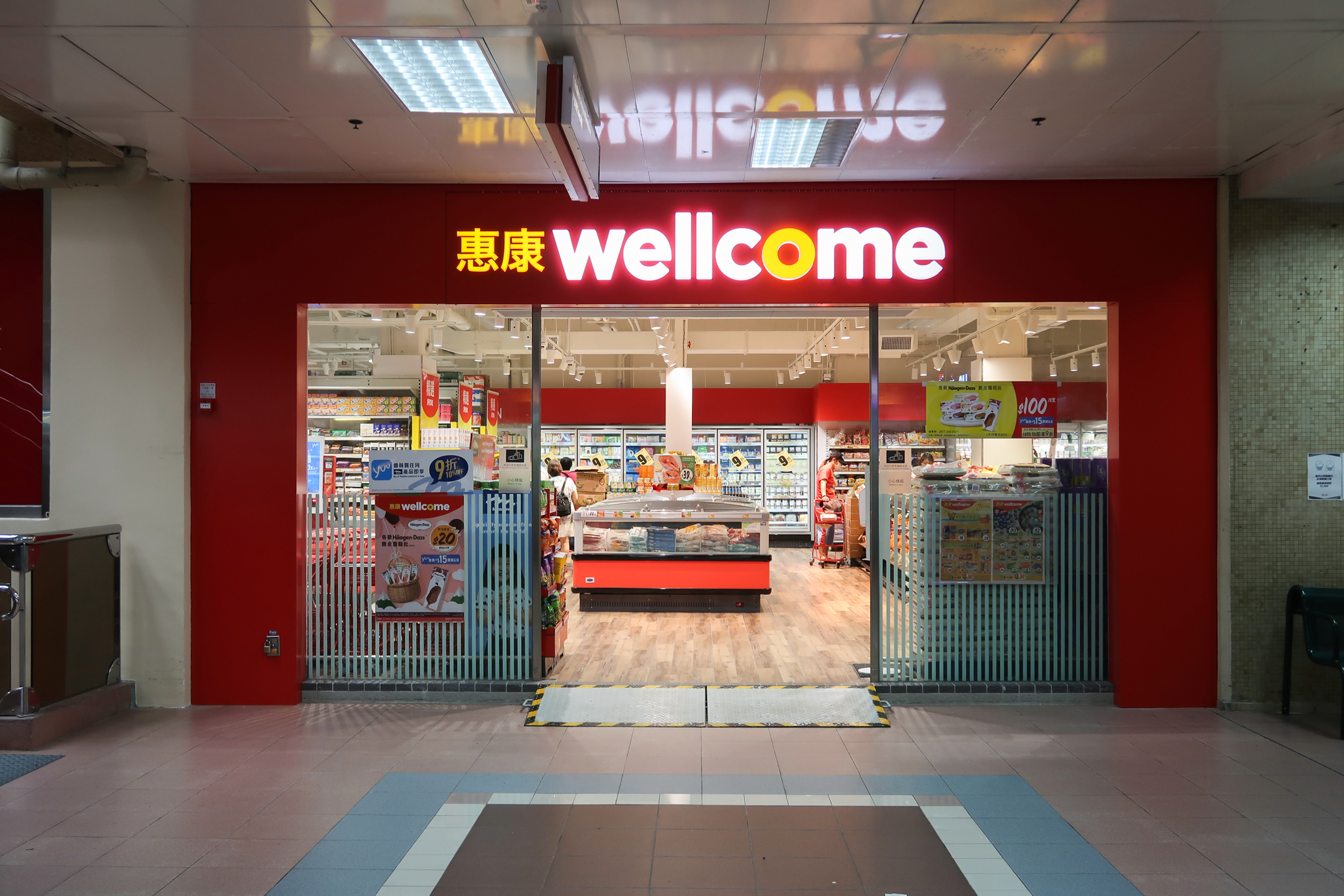
An outlet in Chun Shek Estate with the 2021 branding

Logo until 2021

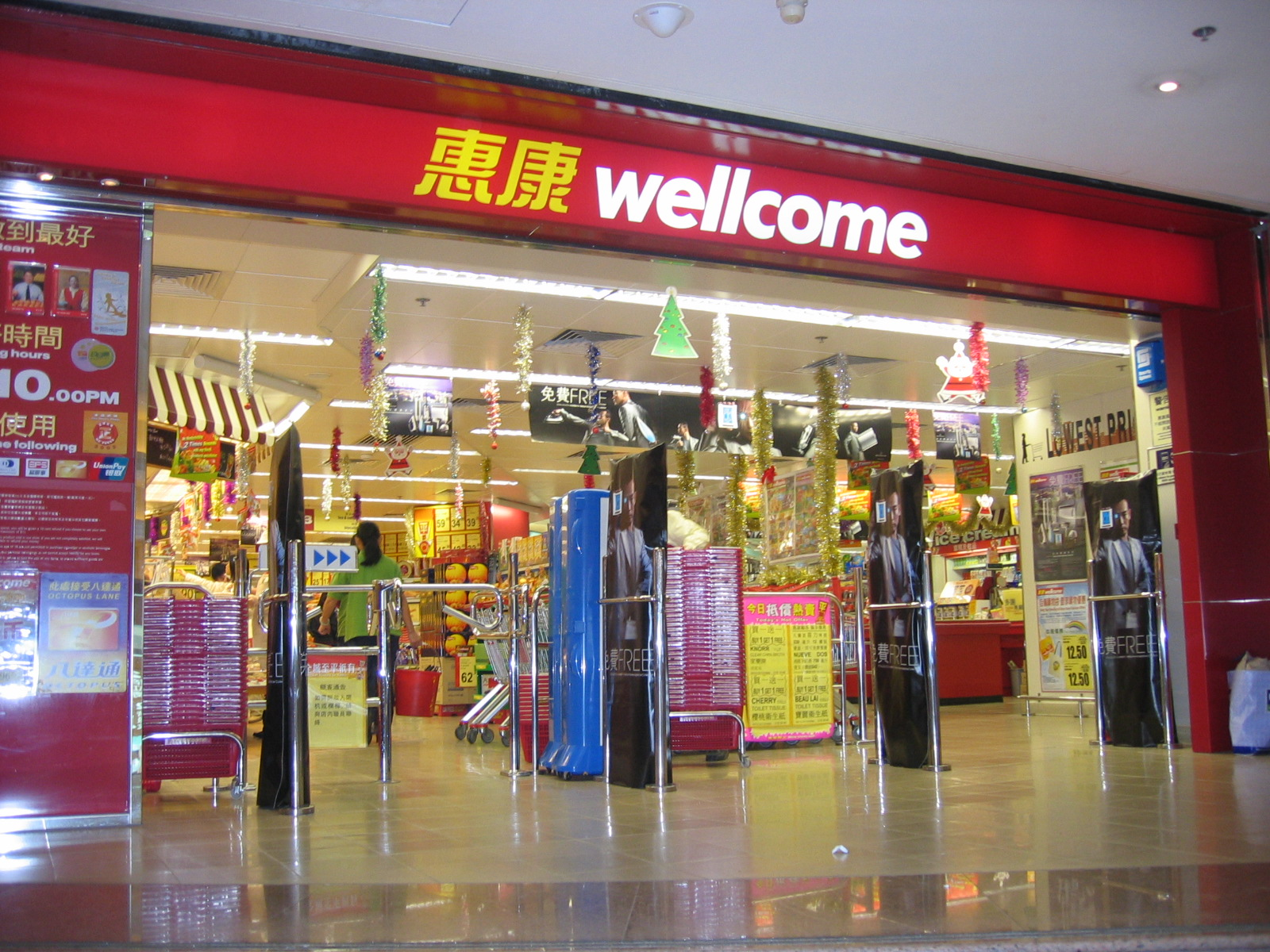
An outlet in Tsim Sha Tsui

Wellcome (Chinese: 惠康; Jyutping: wai6 hong1; pinyin: Huìkāng) is a supermarket chain owned by British conglomerate Jardine Matheson Holdings via its DFI Retail Group subsidiary. The Wellcome supermarket chain is one of the two largest supermarket chains in Hong Kong, the other being ParknShop.

DFI formerly operated supermarkets in the Philippines and Taiwan (Chinese: 頂好; pinyin: Dǐnghǎo) under the Wellcome name, and has various other supermarkets around Asia including Market Place, Cold Storage, Hero and Giant.

== History ==
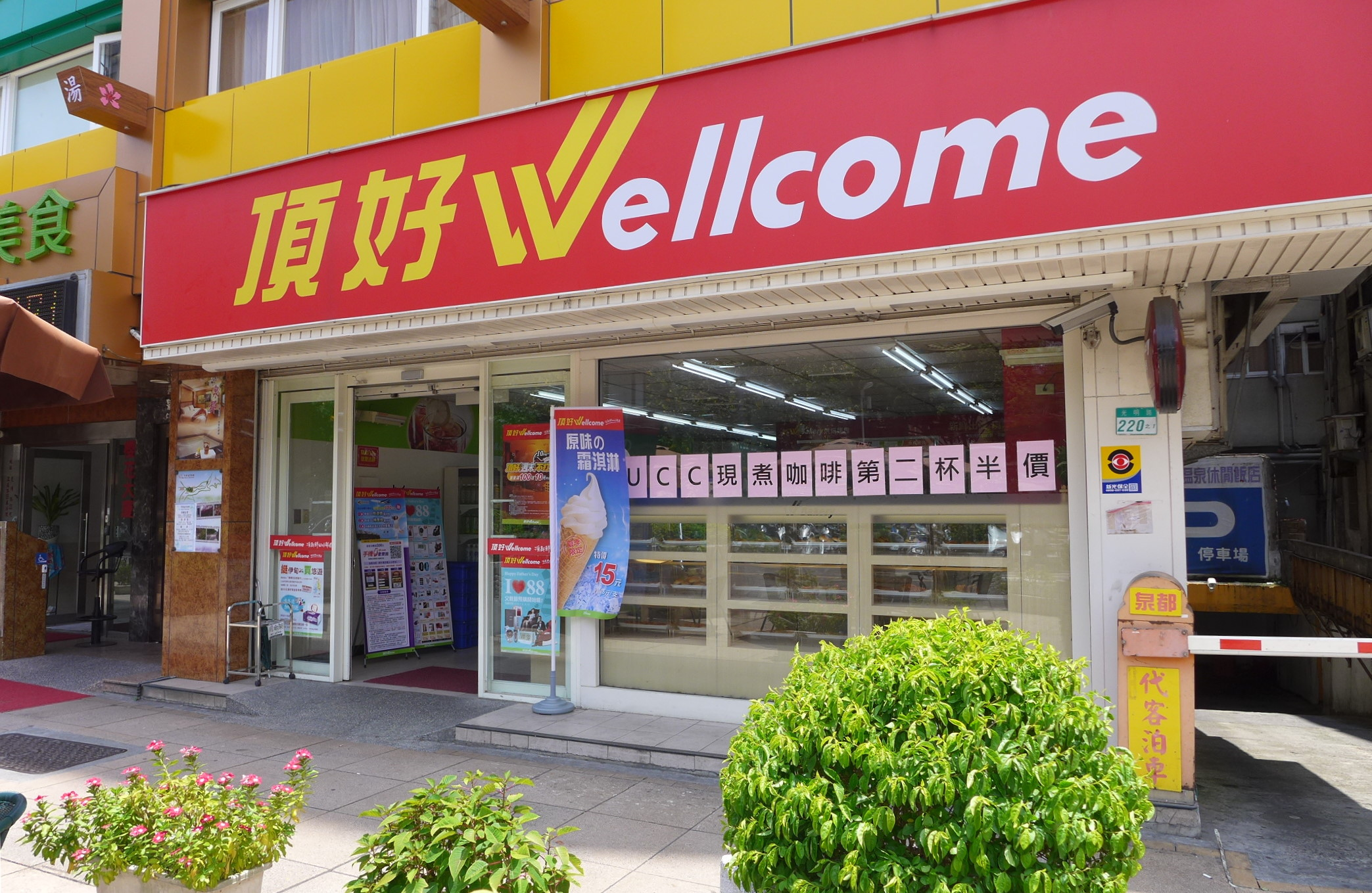
A former outlet in Taipei

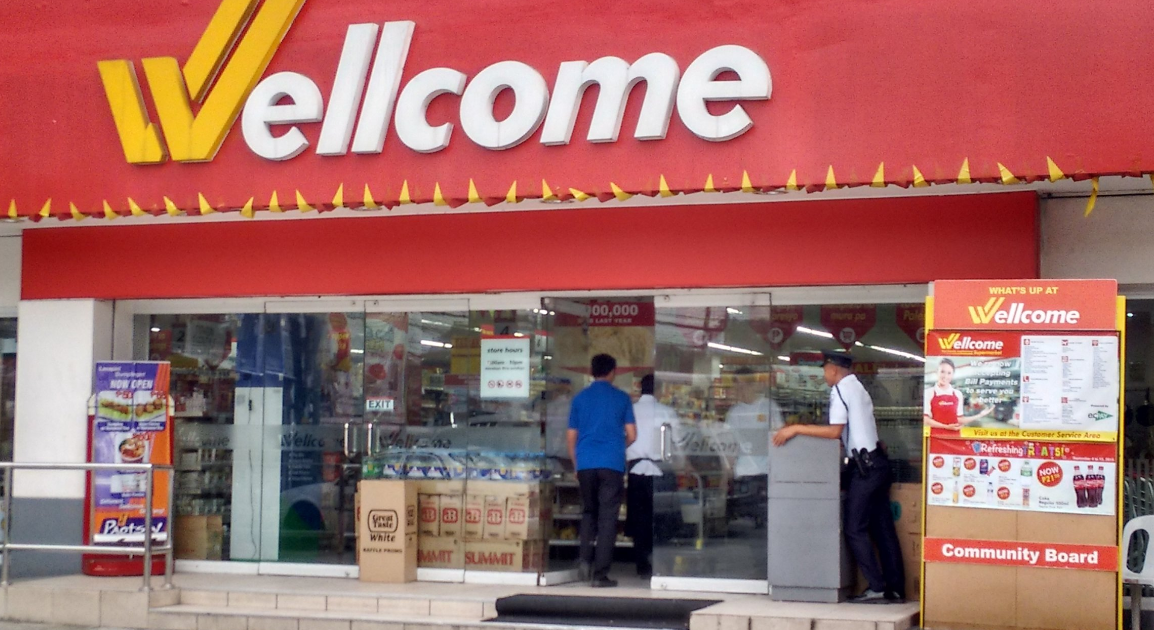
A former outlet in Quezon City

Founded in 1945, Wellcome is Hong Kong's longest-established supermarket chain. Since 1964, the company has been wholly owned by Dairy Farm International Holdings following the merger with rival supermarket Dairy Lane. Wellcome has an overall staff of 5,000 in more than 240 stores and serves more than 14 million customers every month.

Wellcome was established in 1945 by Mr. Wu Chung-Wai, Mr. Lau Lim and Mr. Ko Yin-Yu. Wellcome established its first store on Ice House Street in Central. The shop specialised in imported products including wines, biscuits, canned food and beverages. Wellcome was the first supermarket to establish a Home Delivery Service division, and an average of 600 customers enjoyed this one-of-a-kind service through orders in person daily. Wellcome was acquired by Dairy Farm(Now DFI Retail Group) in 1964. The company was the first to introduce a "self-service" retailing concept. Customers no longer require the assistance of service staff to get products; they have to select products from the shelf. Wellcome was the first to offer pre-packaged rice products in 1973.

In the 1980s, Wellcome launched its first corporate brand "No Frills", offering customers over 300 products at the lowest prices as compared to other products in the same category. Later, Wellcome became the first supermarket to employ Electronic data interchange (EDI) technology to improve the efficiency of operation. Wellcome expanded to Taiwan and acquired Ding Hao supermarket. Wellcome opened its first 24-hour store in Great George Street, Causeway Bay on 23 October 1998. Wellcome established its second corporate brand, First Choice, with a product range of over 1,000 items. With prices at 20–30% less than competitive international brands, it is a well-known brand in Hong Kong. A HK$400 million investment, "Wellcome Fresh Food Centre" was opened in 1998, occupying an area of 161,000 sq. ft.

In the 1990s, Wellcome Hong Kong to become the first to use the UPC system in Hong Kong supermarkets, offers a more efficient and more convenient payment services. According to the report of 2004–2008, Wellcome supermarkets and thus increase the number of branches. Wellcome introduced the "Vote For Your Favourite Brand" campaign in 2000 and soon opened a superstore at Tuen Mun Town Plaza. The Wellcome superstore introduced a new "one-stop" shopping service, embracing the concepts of both wet market and grocery shop under one roof. Wellcome also began its double refund offer with lowest price guarantee by doubling the difference back to customers.

Wellcome unveiled its Stanley store in January 2003. It is the first supermarket located inside a 100-year-old historical building – the old Stanley Police Station.

In 2014, Wellcome Taiwan was found to have used contaminated ingredients in its mushroom and minced pork seasonings, drawing it into the 2014 Taiwan food scandal. Wellcome Taiwan was acquired by Carrefour in 2020. While Wellcome Philippines locations were turned into Robinsons Easymart after Robinsons Retail purchased Rustan's Supercenters.

== Brands ==
=== Private labels ===
Wellcome supermarkets sell products from DFI's Meadows and Yu Pin King private labels.

=== Wellcome Superstore ===
The first Wellcome Superstore was opened in 2000 and currently it has 31 superstores, spread across Hong Kong. They stock a greater variety of products, tailored to local demand.

=== Wellcome Fresh ===
The Wellcome Superstore in The Belcher's became Wellcome Fresh in 2021.

=== Market Place ===
DFI also operates supermarkets under the Market Place (formerly Marketplace by Jasons and Jason's Food & Living), 3hreeSixty, Jasons ichiba and Oliver's The Delicatessen brands in Hong Kong.
