= Debit card cashback =

Cash withdrawal service offered by retailer

Debit card cashback (known as cashback at the tills in the United Kingdom, and as cash out in Australia and New Zealand), is a service offered to retail customers whereby an amount is added to the total purchase price of a transaction paid by debit card and the customer receives that amount in cash along with the purchase. For example, a customer purchasing $18.99 worth of goods at a supermarket might ask for twenty dollars cashback. The customer would approve a debit payment of $38.99 to the store, and the cashier would then give the customer $20 in cash.

Debit card cashback is available through common payment networks like Visa, Mastercard, American Express. By providing an outlet for the cash that a store takes in, it reduces the store's need to deposit excess cash to a bank at the close of business. Many customers find it a useful way to obtain cash as it avoids them having to use a cash machine, which may incur additional fees.

== Coverage ==
The service is offered by both banks and merchants in places such as the Czech Republic, United States, Canada, United Kingdom, Australia, New Zealand, Ireland, Hong Kong, Belgium, Germany, Sweden, Norway, Poland, the Netherlands, and Spain because of the fee structures in use in those areas:

1. When accepting payment by debit card, merchants pay a fixed commission fee (as opposed to a percentage) to their bank or merchant service provider. (This is because the commission paid by the merchant for accepting debit cards, unlike credit cards, does not need to fund interest free credit or other incentives).
2. Accepting payments in cash can be costly for merchants, given that many British banks charge around 0.5% for depositing cash into a business bank account, along with the costs of transporting and insuring the cash.

The combination of these two factors means that the retailer can save money by offering the cashback service. It does not cost the retailer more in commission to add cashback to a debit card purchase, but in the process of giving cashback, the retailer can "offload" cash which they would otherwise have to pay to deposit at the bank.

== Fees, operation and advantages ==
The services are restricted to debit cards where the merchant pays a fixed fee for the transaction, it is not offered on payments by most credit cards because they would pay a percentage commission on the additional cash amount to their bank or merchant service provider.

Some vendors enforce a minimum purchase amount or add a fixed fee when providing cashback to a customer.

In many cases, retailers require customers to initial the cashback entry on the till receipt to confirm they have received the cash. This system is used to prevent cashiers surreptitiously adding cashback amounts to a transaction and keeping the money for themselves (or accusations of same), but more importantly, to ensure that customers cannot return to the store with allegations that the attendant "forgot" to hand over the requested cash.

Cashback can have benefits for the customer in many scenarios. In locations where there are no cash machines nearby, or the nearby machines are out of order or empty, a local retailer may be able to supply the required cash instead and to offer more flexibility in note denominations. Sometimes it is simply more convenient to combine the transactions at the retailer and ATM into a single cashback transaction with the retailer.

Additionally, although fees for debit card ATM usage are very rare in countries such as the UK, this is not the case in some other countries. In Canada and the United States, fees of $1~5 are typical when using an ATM from a different bank than the one with which the customer has an account, from both the bank and the ATM owner. According to an October 2019 USA Today article, "the average total cost for an ATM withdrawal still hit a record $4.72, up 3.3% over the past three years and 33% the past decade" in the United States.

The fees in some other countries are even higher. In Germany, for instance, usual fees are €4~5 when using an ATM of another bank network than the one of their bank. This gives rise to another potential cashback advantage for the consumer: by making use of the cashback procedure, this ATM fee can be avoided for the cardholder.

However, many retailers limit the amount customers can receive per transaction, to prevent instances of customers asking for more change than is in the register, or taking a multitude of smaller bills for cash back, leaving little change for future transactions. Therefore, for amounts over ~$20 in the United States, customers are better off using a nearby ATM.

Poland: For standard payment transactions merchants have to pay interest fees as a percentage of payment value, not as a fixed tax. In opposite, for cashback service the merchant receive the fixed fee from the card issuer (~$0.15–0.30), but the one time cashback withdrawal cannot be higher than 300zł (~$80). The cashback service is available at ~1/6 of POS in Poland (2014).

Hong Kong: Free cash withdrawal in major supermarket chains and convenient stores across Hong Kong when purchasing with an EPS supported card, issued by most banks in Hong Kong through the Electronic Payment System.

In 2019, some supermarkets in the United States, such as Harris Teeter, Dillons, and Kroger began to charge customers fees, ranging from $0.50 to $3.50, for the convenience of receiving cash back at the register.
