= Market Place (supermarket) =

Asian supermarket chain

Market Place Cold Storage Fresh Mercató The Marketplace
- Company type: Supermarket
- Industry: Retailing
- Founded: 1975 (Singapore)
- Headquarters: Hong Kong
- Parent: DFI Retail Group
- Website: www.marketplacebyjasons.com

Former logo in Hong Kong

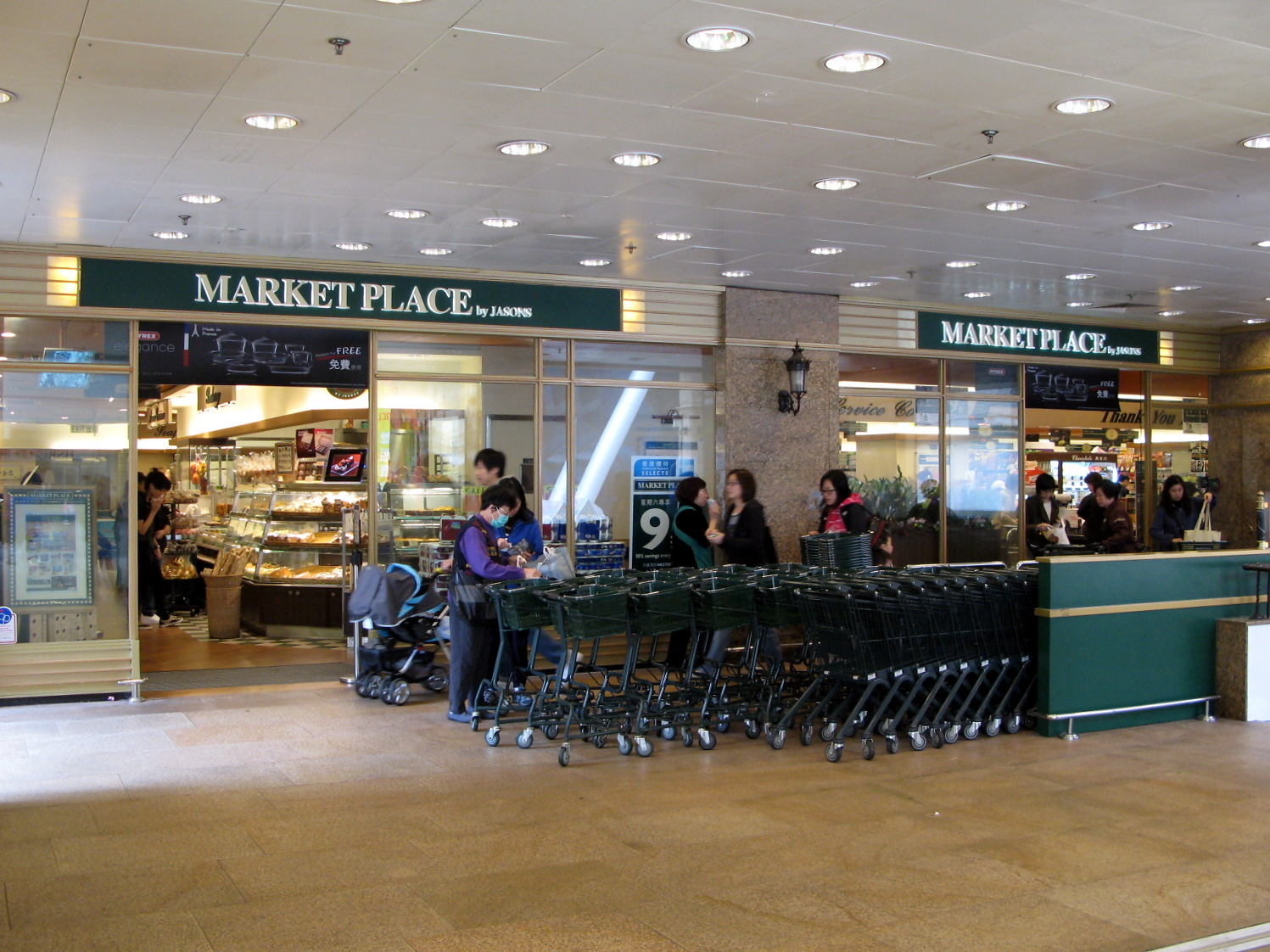
Market Place by Jasons in Telford Plaza, Hong Kong

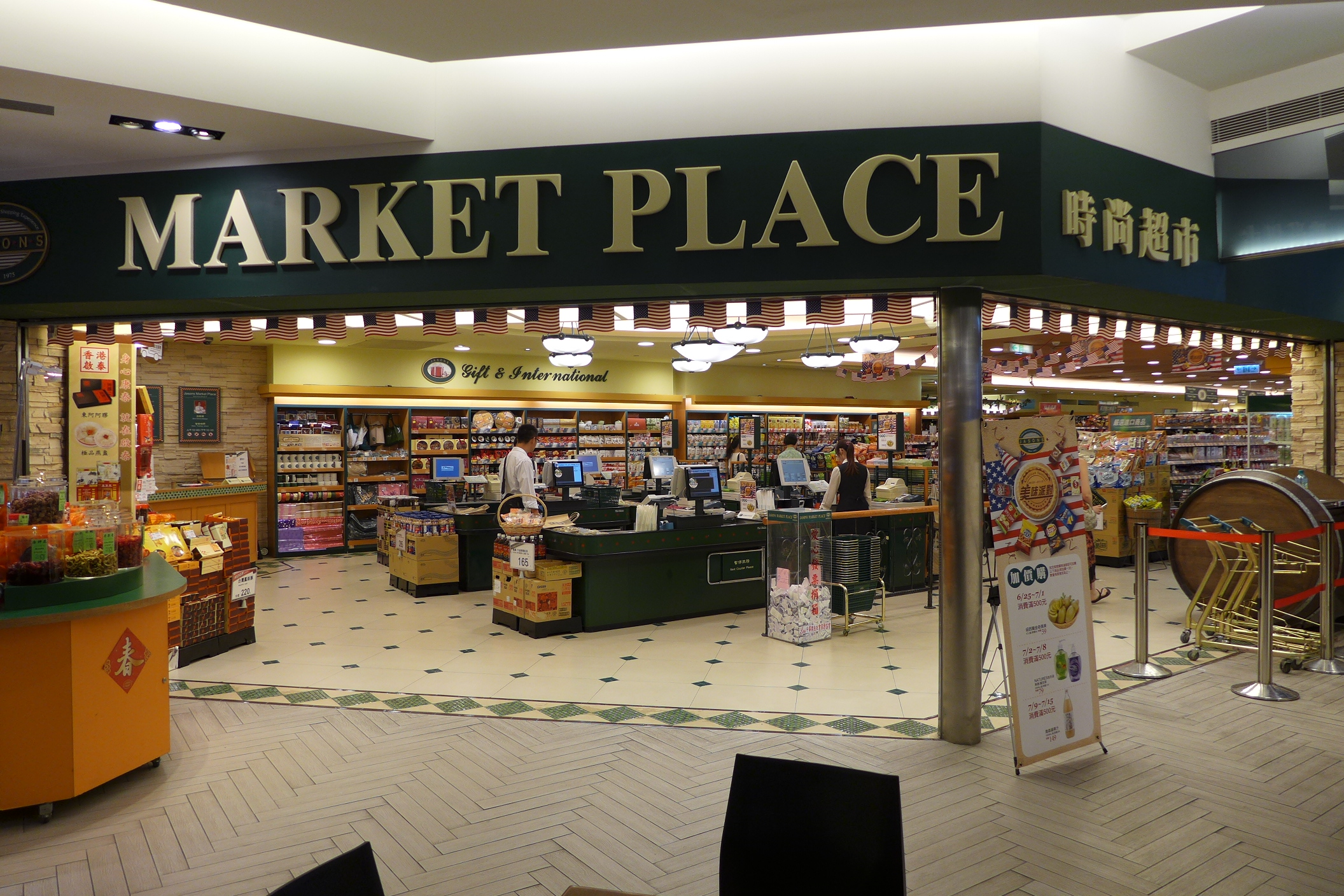
Jasons Market Place in Taipei 101 Mall

Market Place (formerly Market Place by Jasons, Jason's Food & Living, and Jasons ichiba) in Hong Kong is a high-end supermarket chain owned by DFI Retail Group. The chain also has a joint venture in mainland China with Beijing Hualian Group called BHG Market Place and formerly ran stores (Jasons Market Place) in Taiwan until they were sold to Carrefour. The Malaysian chain called Mercató (formerly Jasons Food Hall) is owned by Macrovalue Sdn Bhd. after its acquisition of DFI Malaysian food retailing business in 2023. Cold Storage Fresh (formerly Market Place, Jasons, and Jasons Deli) in Singapore is also owned by Macrovalue Sdn Bhd since 2025. The Marketplace (formerly Market Place by Rustan's) in the Philippines has been owned by Robinsons Retail Holdings since 2018, before which it was owned by Rustan Supercenters.

DFI also operates further similar supermarkets under the 3hreeSixty and Oliver's The Delicatessen brands in Hong Kong and other supermarkets around Asia with Wellcome.

== History ==
Jasons Market Place started its business in Singapore in 1975. It was introduced in Taiwan in 2003. In 2007, it opened in Hong Kong's Jardine's Lookout under the name "Market Place by Jasons". In 2012, Jasons Food Hall began operations in the Bangsar Shopping Centre, an upmarket shopping mall in the township of Bangsar, Malaysia, as a replacement for a Cold Storage store. Jasons Market Place in Taiwan was sold to Carrefour in 2020 and rebranded as Mia C'bon from 2022.

== Brands ==
=== Private labels ===
Market Place supermarkets sell products from DFI's Meadows and Yu Pin King private labels.

== See also ==
- Dairy Farm International Holdings
- Cold Storage
- Wellcome
