= Suguo Supermarket =

Chinese supermarket chain

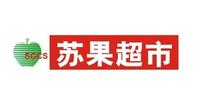
Logo of Suguo Supermarket

Suguo Supermarket, founded in 1996, its predecessor the Jiangsu Fruit & Food Corporation, is now the biggest retailer in Jiangsu province, China, which has made contributions to the convenience of the whole society. The 'Su' means 'Jiangsu', while the 'Guo' signifies 'Fruit & Food'. Suguo Supermarket has been among the Top 10 corporations of the same kind for almost eleven years and now it has over 50% of the market share in Jiangsu.

In 2010, Suguo Supermarket met its goal of 36.8 billion Yuan's sale and its 1905 subsidiaries cover Jiangsu, Anhui, Hebei, Hubei, Henan, Shandong. According to some authoritative organization's statistics, the value of Suguo is now 6.034 billion Yuan.

In recent years, Suguo has kept its own strategies such as expanding in low cost, developing rural market all the time, making itself develop differently in a distinctive way within own features. At the same time, Suguo Supermarket innovates very actively not only in aspects such as management, encouragement, but also in marketing, as well as develops and expands enterprise culture, which brings Suguo plenty of vigour and energy. Suguo has also been devoted to the expansion of rural marketing for a long time and has put many measures into practise: sixty percent of Suguo Supermarkets are in countries and 40% of its products come from there, which received much praise from local governments and party organizations. In 2002, 2005, and 2006, Wen Jiabao gave Suguo guidance three times and he also came to Suguo himself in 2006 and 2007 to have an inspection visit.

== The Physical Distribution of Suguo ==
In Nanjing, there are two physical distribution centers named Maqun Center and South Center, which both guarantee the supply of all the supermarkets in Nanjing.

=== Maqun Center ===
Maqun Center of physical distribution is located in Machun, which is surrounded by Zhongshan Tomb, Nanjing-Shanghai highway, Nanjing-Hangzhou highway, and the Changjiang Bridge. This location gives plenty of convenience to Maqun center and the large area of storage also contributes to the form of this biggest distribution center in China.

=== South Center ===
This center's name also comes from its location. It is situated at the south gate of Yuhua District, Nanjing. From this center, trucks can easily and conveniently distribute everything to not only Nanjing, but also other cities like Shanghai, Wuxi, Hefei. It was once a department of Jiangsu Food&Fruit Corporation.

== Credit ==
Suguo Supermarket has owned countless awards from the beginning of it, here are some of them:

1, Jiangsu Outstanding Enterprise, 1999

2, Jiangsu Model Enterprise, 2003

3, China Eminent Business Enterprise, 2005

4, China Meritorious Enterprise, 2008

5, The Most Favourite Corporation, 2010

== Great Innovations ==
1996.7 Suguo Supermarket was founded in Nanjing formally.

1996.8 Suguo Supermarket of Beishizu'an, the first market of Suguo's history, was put into business.

1998.4 Suguo Supermarket of Lishui and Gaochun were open for business at the same time, marking the beginning of the extension of Suguo.

1998.8 Suguo Supermarket of Dazhongqiao was open, which was the first market using POS-MIS system.

1999.2 The total daily turnover of all the Suguo Supermarkets achieved 18 million.

1999.2 Suguo Supermarket of Shanxi Road, the 100th market of Suguo, was open in much praise.

1999.9 The total daily turnover of all the Suguo Supermarkets achieved 20 million.

2000.8 According to some scientific statistics of an official report, Suguo Supermarket is the 13th of the greatest retailers.

2001.2 Suguo Supermarket Corporation became Suguo Supermarket Co., Ltd.

2001.6 Suguo Market of Qingliangmen, the 500th market of this great company, was open during the anniversary of Suguo.

2001.7 Suguo Supermarket welcomed its fifth anniversary.

2001.10 The vice president of Jiangsu, Liangbaohua came to observe Suguo and listened to a report show Suguo's development.

2003.4 Official workers of government of Nanjing recommended staff of Suguo to devote themselves of anti-SARS.

2003.7 Suguo made some improvement on their facilities and MIS system.

2003.10 In the conference of National Business, the statistics shown by the Ministry of Commerce of China suggested that Suguo's annual turnover is seventh nationwide.
