= U Select =

Hong Kong-based supermarket chain

U購select
- Native name: U購select超級市場
- Industry: Supermarket
- Founded: April 2015; 11 years ago
- Number of locations: 10 stores (October 2025)
- Area served: Hong Kong
- Parent: China Resources Vanguard
- Website: www.uselect.com.hk

U Select
- Traditional Chinese: U購select超級市場
Transcriptions
Yue: Cantonese
- Yale Romanization: U gau Select chīu kāp síh chèuhng
- Jyutping: U gau3 Select ciu1 kap1 si5 coeng4

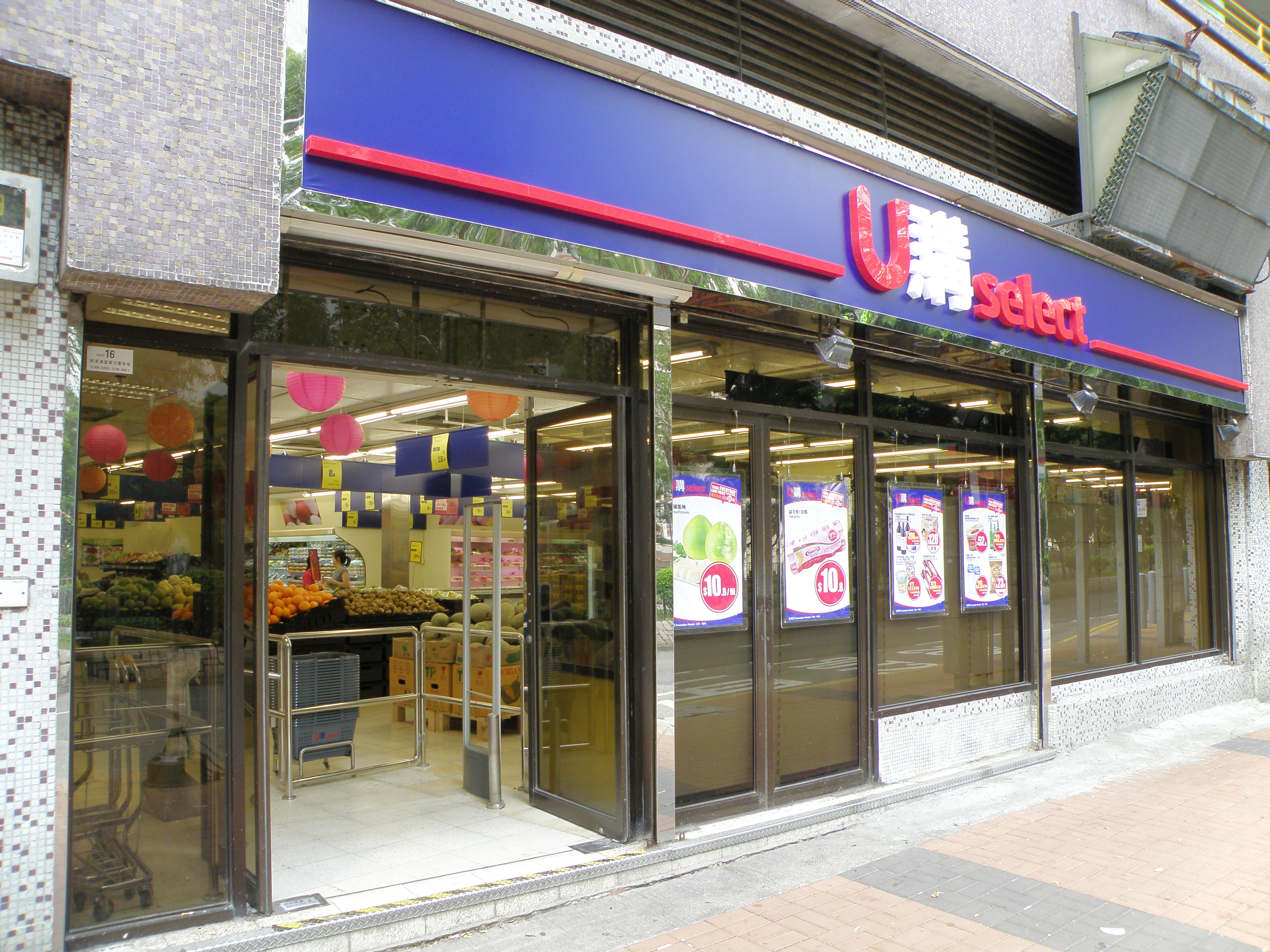
U Select in Tseung Kwan O

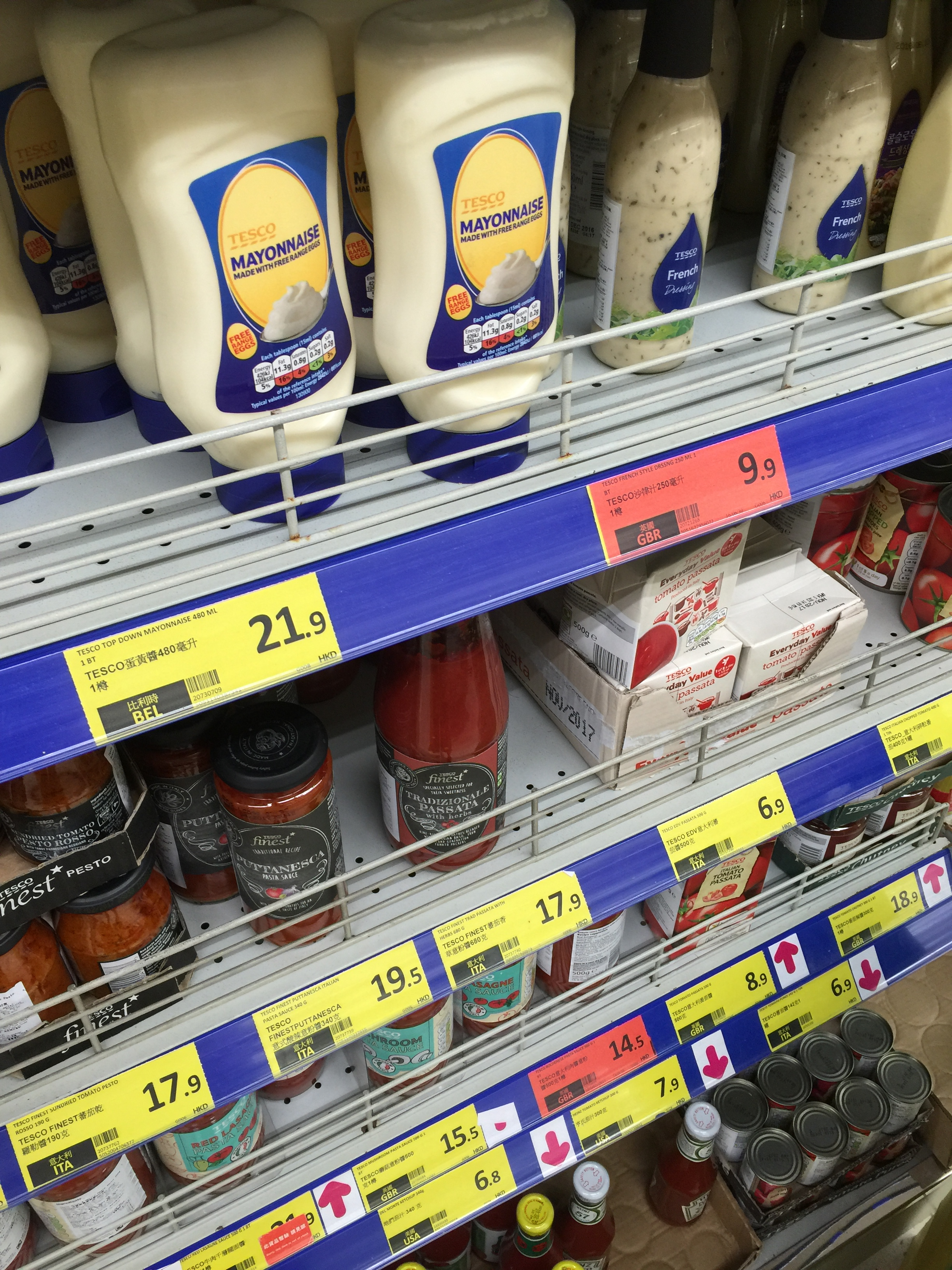
Tesco products for sale in U Select

U Select is a chain of supermarkets in Hong Kong operated by China Resources Vanguard, originally in partnership with Tesco. At least one third of the products sold in the store came from overseas supermarket chains. As part of Tesco's decision to cease international product sales due to Brexit, U Select instead started stocking Coles products from December 2021, and also begun stocking Morrisons products from May 2022.

== History ==
On 18 August 2013, China Resources Enterprise's supermarket chain Vanguard and British supermarket Tesco signed a "memorandum of understanding", intending to set up a joint venture interest group in mainland China, Hong Kong and Macau, operating hypermarkets, supermarkets, convenience stores, liquor stores and cash and carry businesses. China Resources and Tesco are holding an 80% and a 20% share respectively.

In April 2015, China Resources opened the first U Select supermarkets, with the first two stores opening on 18 April 2015 in Prince Edward Road West and Bellagio Mall.

In June 2015, the third branch opened on Main Street East, Shau Kei Wan.

On 17 September 2015, the tenth branch (the second outlet in Kowloon) opened at Hip Wo Street in Cheung Wo Court, Kwun Tong.

As of May 2018, there were 37 stores.

As of February 2021, there are 67 stores.

As of July 2021, there are 75 stores.

== Store types ==
=== U Select ===
The original branches of U Select had a blue colour scheme and were originally intended to be a value chain, previously only taking cash and not credit/debit cards.

=== U Select Food ===
In June 2019, the first U Select Food was opened in South Horizons, with others opening later. U Select Food outlets had more foreign products (especially food), less non-food products, and used a black colour scheme.

=== U Select Mini ===
On 22 April 2021, the first U Select Mini opened on King's Road, a converted VanGO convenience store from the same family. There were only two U Select Mini outlets, both located on Hong Kong Island.

== Locations ==
All the original locations were converted from Vanguard supermarkets with other locations added later:

=== Hong Kong Island ===
- 26 stores

=== Kowloon ===
- 28 stores

=== New Territories ===
- 21 stores
