= DFI Retail Group =

Asian retail company

DFI Retail Group Holdings Limited

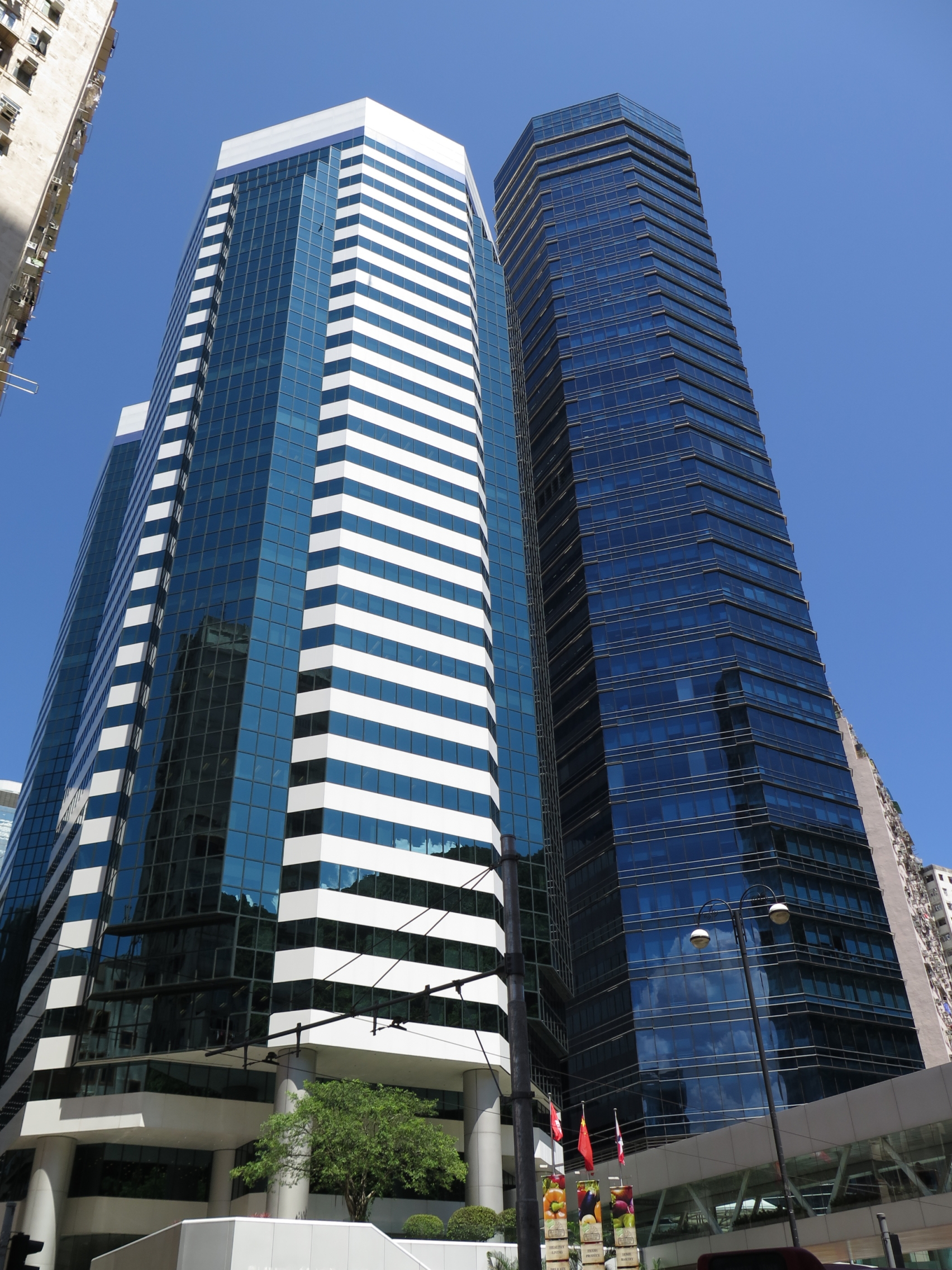
- The headquarters of the DFI Retail Group at Devon House, Hong Kong
- Formerly: Dairy Farm International Holdings Limited (until 2022)
- Type: Public
- Traded as: LSE: DFIB; SGX: D01
- Industry: Retail
- Founded: 1886; 140 years ago
- Founder: Sir Patrick Manson
- Headquarters: Quarry Bay, Hong Kong (HQ); Bermuda (Legal base); Singapore (Legal base)
- Key people: Benjamin William Keswick (chairman); Scott Price (Group CEO)
- Products: Food, health and beauty products
- Revenue: US$28.2 billion
- Owner: Jardine Strategic (78%)
- Number of employees: 200,000
- Website: www.dfiretailgroup.com

DFI Retail Group Holdings Limited
- Traditional Chinese: 牛奶國際控股有限公司
- Simplified Chinese: 牛奶国际控股有限公司
Transcriptions
Standard Mandarin
- Hanyu Pinyin: Niúnǎi Guójì Kònggǔ Yǒuxiàngōngsī
Yue: Cantonese
- Jyutping: ngau4 naai5 gwok3 zai3 hung3 gu2 jau5 haan6 gung1 si1

DFI Retail Group Holdings Limited (formerly known as Dairy Farm International Holdings Limited) is a Hong Kong–based retail company with legal bases in Bermuda and Singapore. A subsidiary of the Jardine Matheson Group, it is a major East and Southeast Asian retailer involved in the processing and wholesaling of food and health and beauty products. Jardine Strategic, a publicly listed holding company, has an attributable 78 percent stake in the firm. It is listed on the London Stock Exchange, with secondary listings on the Singapore Exchange (SGX) and Bermuda Stock Exchange (BSX).

The head office is located at Devon House in Taikoo Place, Quarry Bay, Hong Kong.

As of 31 December 2020, the Group, its associates and joint ventures operated over 9,997 outlets; Wellcome/Food World (supermarkets), a controlling stake in Maxim's Catering (foodservice), Cold Storage (supermarkets), Jasons Market Place/Market Place by Jasons/Jasons Food Hall (high end supermarkets), Hero (supermarkets), Mannings/Guardian (health and beauty) stores; it also operates 7-Eleven (convenience stores) throughout the region, and IKEA (home furnishings) stores in Hong Kong, Macau, Indonesia and Taiwan.

The group and its associates and joint ventures employed more than 220,000 people and had total annual sales in excess of US$28.2 billion.

== History ==
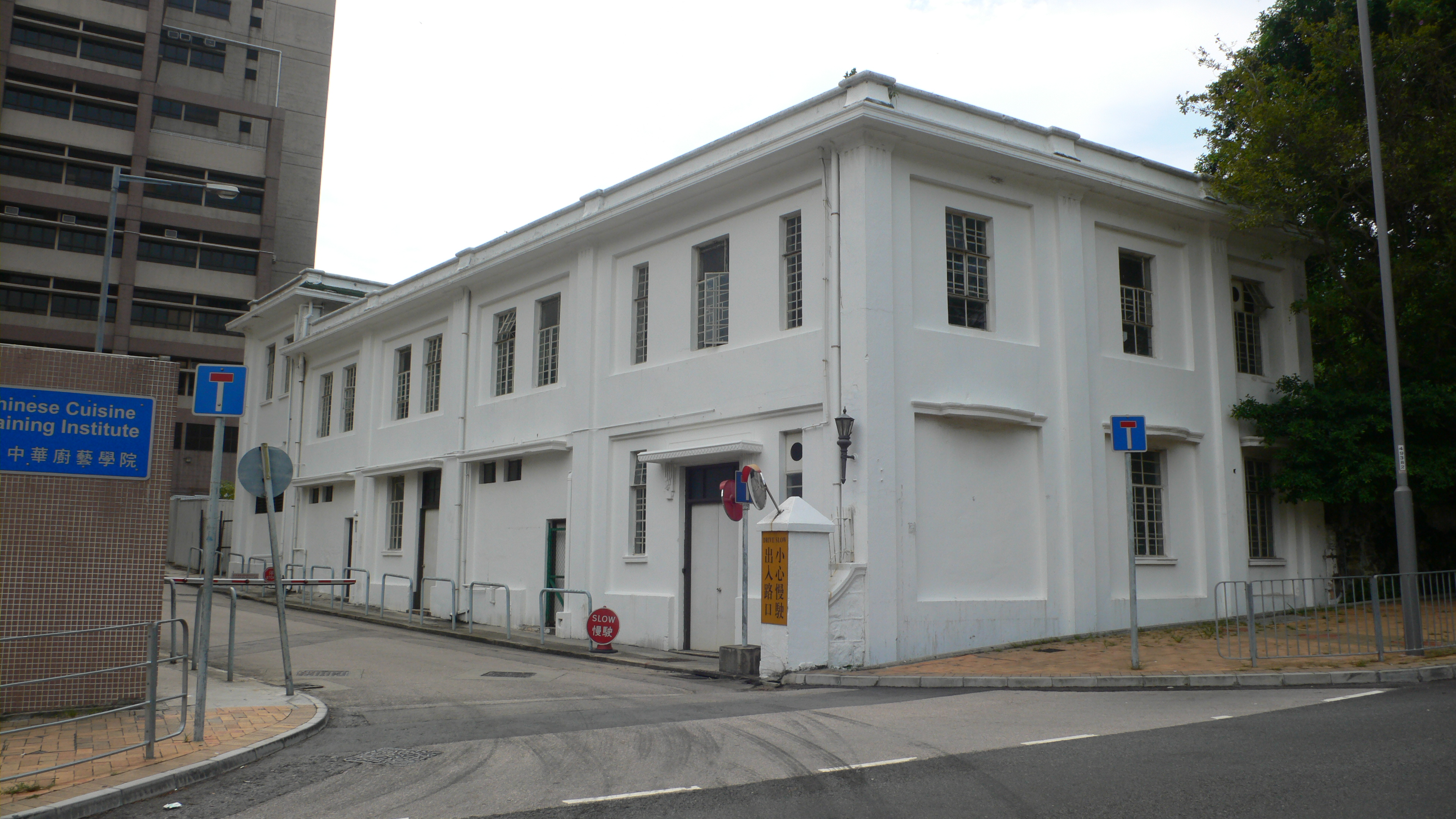
Dairy Farm's old office in Pok Fu Lam.

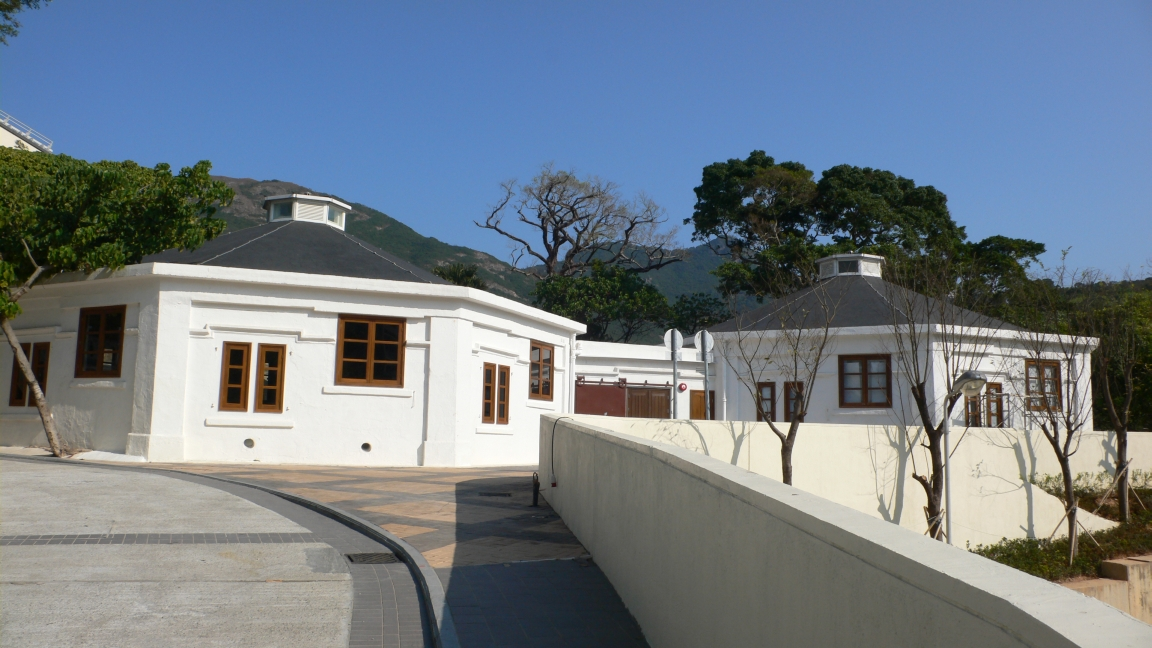
The old cowsheds in Pok Fu Lam, part of the Hong Kong Academy for Performing Arts Béthanie campus.

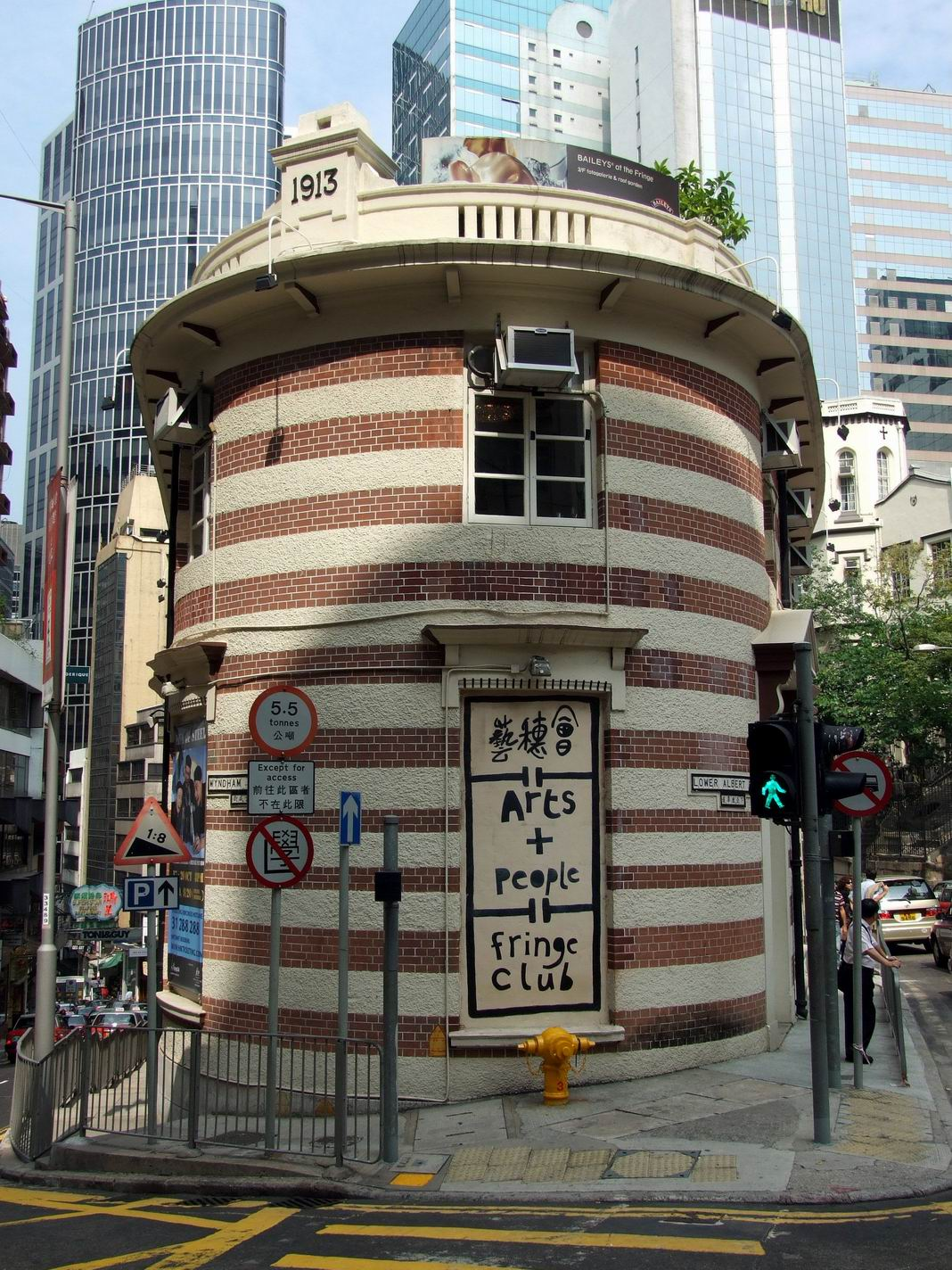
Exterior view of the Old Dairy Farm Depot, housing the Hong Kong Fringe Club

=== 19th century: Early history ===
Dairy Farm Company Ltd was set up in 1886 by Sir Patrick Manson, a Scottish surgeon, along with Sir Paul Chater, Mr Phineas Ryrie, Mr Granville Sharp, Mr WH Ray and Mr JB Coughtry, five other prominent Hong Kong businessmen. The company was created with three founding objectives: to improve the health of Hong Kong people by providing them with non-contaminated cows' milk, to breed a herd of imported dairy cattle locally to decrease the price of milk by half, and to realise profit for its shareholders. Manson purchased 80 Friesian cows from Scotland and a plot of land for his farm in Pok Fu Lam.

In 1890, Dairy Farm built a low-rise brick and stucco building on Lower Albert Road in Central for use as a cold storage warehouse. This warehouse was later renovated and expanded in 1913 to include a dairy shop, a room for meat smoking, a cold storage room for winter clothes and residency for its manager. The building later evolved into the company headquarters until the company moved in the 1970s. The abandoned building was acquired by the Hong Kong Fringe Club, a non-profit-making arts organisation in 1984, and has been carefully restored. This distinctive 19th century building, known as the Old Dairy Farm Depot, is a well-known landmark in Central providing a wide variety of cultural activities and performances.

=== 20th century ===
In 1904, Dairy Farm began importing frozen meat and opened its first retail store at the Central District depot. The second Dairy Farm store was established on Nathan Road, Kowloon towards the end of the war in 1918. Amongst other things, this store provided fishing boats in Hong Kong with large amounts of ice.

In 1960, Dairy Farm and Lane Crawford formed a merged food retailing operations and renamed these supermarkets as Dairy Lane under Dairy Lane Limited. This joint business was undone by the acquisition of the Wellcome chain in 1964.

In 1972, Dairy Farm was acquired by Hong Kong Land, a Jardines subsidiary. In 1986 Dairy Farm was relisted on the Hong Kong Stock Exchange after it was demerged from Hong Kong Land. Dairy Farm acquired a 50% interest in Maxim's at the same time from Hong Kong Land. The 7-Eleven convenience store chain in Hong Kong and Singapore was acquired from Jardine Matheson in 1989.

=== 21st century ===
Since 1999, Dairy Farm has continued to expand its footprint by acquiring supermarket and other retail operations in Taiwan, Malaysia, Singapore and Indonesia. Notably, it also acquired IKEA Hong Kong, Taiwan in 2002 and began Ikea's Indonesian operation in 2014.

In May 2012, Dairy Farm bought a 50% stake in the Rustan Supercenters, Inc., the Rustan group's supermarket chain. 36% came from the Tantoco family and 14% from the Spinnaker group. Its holdings increased to 64% in 2015 and 100% in 2017. On March 23, 2018, the entire stake was sold to Robinsons Retail Holdings, Inc. through a stock swap, yielding Dairy Farm 18.25% of Robinsons Retail Holdings, Inc. stock. In 2018, therefore, Rustan Supercenters are fully acquired by Robinsons Retail Holdings the 20.00% of which is owned by Mulgrave Corporation and GCH Investments, wholly owned subsidiaries of Dairy Farm.

As of June 2011, Dairy Farm is 78% owned by Jardine Matheson Holdings.

In August 2021, Dairy Farm rebranded its trading name to DFI Retail Group. On 5 May 2022, the company subsequently changed its legal name to DFI Retail Group Holdings Limited, effectively phased out the Dairy Farm branding.

== Discontinued operations ==
- In 1998, Dairy Farm sold out its 49% interest in Nestlé Dairy Farm, set up in 1992 to develop dairy products factories throughout China, to Nestlé; on the merger of Kwik Save with Somerfield, Dairy Farm sold its 11% holding for US$290 million. Dairy Farm acquired 25% of the "No Frills" Kwik Save Group in 1987; Sold the 108-store Simago chain in Spain acquired in 1990.
- In March 2000, Dairy Farm sold its half share in DFI Géant, the Taiwan hypermarket opened in 1998 back to Casino, its joint venture partner.
- In 2001, the company sold the 287-store Franklins chain in Australia which it acquired in 1978. Its Hong Kong–based distribution business, Sims Trading, was sold to CITIC Pacific.
- In June 2002, the 61-store Woolworths chain in New Zealand acquired in 1990, was sold for US$337 million.
- In 2004, the Group's Hong Kong ice manufacturing business which began in 1918 was sold for US$107 million.
- In 2023, the Group's Malaysian food retailing business was sold to Macrovalue Sdn Bhd
- On 19 April 2024, DFI's subsidiary PT Hero Supermarket Tbk announced it would divest its supermarket businesses along with the rights to the Hero brand to PT Hero Retail Nusantara for 135 billion rupiahs.
- In 2025, DFI Retail Group in Singapore announced the sale of its food retail operations (Cold Storage, CS Fresh, Jasons Deli, and Giant) to Malaysian-based Macrovalue for S$125 million. It will however, place its current focus on following the sale, to operate its other retail businesses in Singapore, primarily focusing on 7-Eleven (convenience stores) and Guardian (health and beauty stores).

== Controversy ==
Wellcome, a major food retailer owned by Dairy Farm Group, have been cited by the Taiwanese government for 33 labor violations in Taiwan. These include instances of maintaining unsafe work spaces that potentially endangered employees, having staff members work unpaid overtime beyond legal limitations, and refusing pay and rest time to employees.

== See also ==
- The Hongs
- Wellcome/Food World
- Maxim's
- Cold Storage
- Jasons Market Place/Market Place by Jasons
- Giant
- Mannings/Guardian
- Rustan's
