= Hero (supermarket) =

Indonesian supermarket operator

PT Hero Retail Nusantara
- Type: Private
- Industry: Retail
- Founded: 23 August 1971; 55 years ago
- Founders: Muhammad Saleh Kurnia; Nurhayati
- Headquarters: Synthesis Square Tower 2, Jl. Jend. Gatot Subroto No. 17, Jakarta, Indonesia
- Number of locations: 341 stores (2022)
- Key people: Ipung Kurnia
- Brands: Hero Supermarket; Mitra Diskon Swalayan
- Owners: DFI Retail Group (1998–2024); Hero Intiputra (since 2024)
- Number of employees: 4,481 (2023)

PT Hero Retail Nusantara, commonly known as Hero, is one of Indonesia's largest supermarket operators. It is owned by Hero Intiputra and affiliated with DFI Nusantara, formerly known as Hero Group.

Focusing on middle-income segment customers, the company's first store opened in 1972. As of 2022, the company operates 341 stores throughout the country. It has a sister brand called Mitra Diskon Swalayan, which is the re-incarnation of Giant hypermarket that previously operated in Indonesia.

== History ==
=== Establishment ===
The roots of Hero Supermarket could be traced back to 1954, where a 19-year old Muhammad Saleh Kurnia started "CV Hero" with his brother, Wuo Guo Chang. 5 years later, his brother quit, and Kurnia had to continue the business himself.

In the 1960's, Kurnia realized that many Indonesians and expatriates often travel to Singapore just to purchase western imported food and beverages. He saw an opportunity to import the goods directly to Indonesia. After receiving advice from his Canadian friend Charles Turton, Kurnia and his wife (Nurhayati) traveled to Singapore to learn how Singaporean stores were configured. Then in 1972, the couple opened the first Hero store in Kebayoran Baru, Jakarta.

=== Further developments ===
During Indonesia's New Order period, Hero and its competitor Gelael Supermarket were the only major supermarkets in Jakarta, with Hero operating 9 stores in Jakarta alone. Most Indonesians purchased their groceries in the wet markets, while supermarkets were considered prestigious and restricted to the upper class.

The company went public in 1989 where the founders retaining 50.1% ownership. The remaining shares were held by MPPA Retail Group (part of Lippo Group) with 10.42%, Mulgrave (DFI Retail Group) with 7.63%, SSV Netherland BV with 10.20%, and retail public investors with 21.65%.

In 1990, Hero started its Guardian Pharmacy operation and the mini-market "Starmart" the following year. In 1992, the founder MS Kurnia passed away. His son Ipung Kurnia took control of the business In 2002, the group started its Giant hypermarket operation.

=== Acquisition by DFI ===
In 1998, the founders issued a convertible bond for US$ 36.4 million, which was purchased by Mulgrave. In 2010, Mulgrave exercised the convertible bond for 24.54% stake in the company, making DFI Retail Group the new majority shareholder of PT Hero Supermarket Tbk. MPPA protested the action and went separate ways to build its own store "Hypermart".

In 2014, Hero acquired a license to operate IKEA stores in Indonesia. In 2016, the company sold its mini-market "Starmart" operation to PT Fajar Mitra Indah (part of Wings Group), under which the stores would operate as FamilyMart with new ownership.

=== Decline of Giant ===
The rapid growth of convenience stores and e-commerce in Indonesia shifted consumer behavior to online shopping. This shift resulted in the company downsizing its Giant outlets starting 2019. In 2021, CEO Patrik Lindvall said that management has closely seen the trends of the global hypermarket industry, with Walmart, Carrefour, and Tesco moving away from the industry. Consumers preferred to shop in smaller nearby stores.

The company decided to close the Giant brand effective 31 July 2021. It blamed the COVID-19 pandemic and changes in consumer behavior.

=== Recent times and spin-off ===
With the closure of Giant brands, the company will focus on the operations of Hero, Guardian, and IKEA. The opportunities for Hero Supermarket in the upper-class supermarket segment appear promising and less fragile. The company believes the new brand portfolio focus, mainly Guardian and IKEA, offers sufficient diversity and will serve markets outside the upper-class segment.

The company converted the previous Giant stores to IKEAs or Hero Supermarkets.

PT Hero Supermarket Tbk (now DFI Nusantara) planned to divest its supermarket businesses along with the rights of the "Hero" brand on 19 April 2024 to the Kurnia family's new company PT Hero Retail Nusantara for 135 billion rupiahs.

== Brands ==
=== Current ===
- Hero (1971–present), the flagship supermarket
- Mitra Diskon Swalayan (2024–present), operated as the re-incarnation of Giant

=== Former ===
- Guardian (1990–2024), a pharmacy and health & beauty stores, handled by DFI Nusantara
- IKEA (2014–2024), exclusive license to operate in Indonesian market, handled by DFI Nusantara
- Starmart (1991–2016)

== Slogan history ==
- Rumah Belanja Keluarga (Family Shopping House, 1987–1992)
- Memberi lebih dari yang Anda bayarkan (Give more than you pay for, 1992–1997)
- Kejutan Segar Setiap Hari (Fresh Surprise Every Day, 1997–2000)
- Think Fresh. Shop Hero (2000–2005)
- always my hero! (2005–2009)
- The fresh food people (2009–present)
