= Giant (hypermarket) =

Supermarket chain

GCH Retail (Malaysia) Sdn Bhd

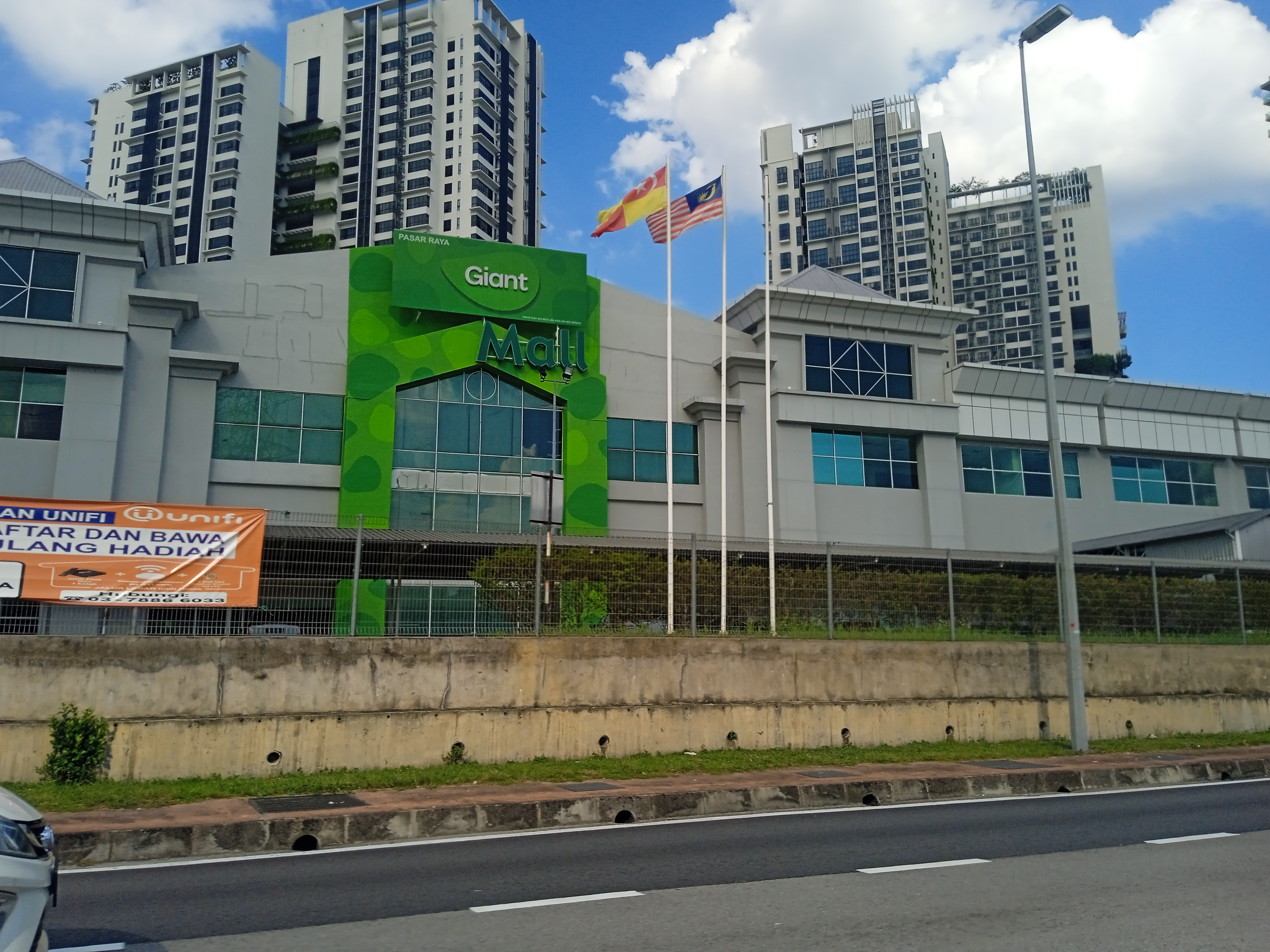
- A Giant Hypermarket in Petaling Jaya, Malaysia
- Type: Private Limited Company
- Industry: Retail: Discount stores, grocery stores, and hypermarkets
- Founded: 1944; 82 years ago in Kuala Lumpur, Federated Malay States (now Malaysia)
- Founder: Teng Family
- Headquarters: Shah Alam, Selangor, Malaysia
- Number of locations: 40 store outlet and 40 Giant Mini (2023)
- Area served: Malaysia and Singapore
- Key people: Simon Keswick (CEO); Howard Mowlem (Chairman/GFD)
- Parent: Teng Family (1944–1999); DFI Retail Group (1999–2023); Macrovalue (2023–present)
- Website: giant.com.my (Malaysia) giant.sg (Singapore)

GCH Retail (Malaysia) Sdn Bhd, doing business as Giant Mall, is a hypermarket brand and retailer chain now mainly in Malaysia, Singapore and formerly Brunei, Cambodia, Indonesia and Vietnam. In 2016, Giant was the largest supermarket chain in Malaysia. Its parent company also operates Mercató, Cold Storage and TMC in Malaysia.

== History ==
The Giant Hypermarket logo used from 1997 to 2020.

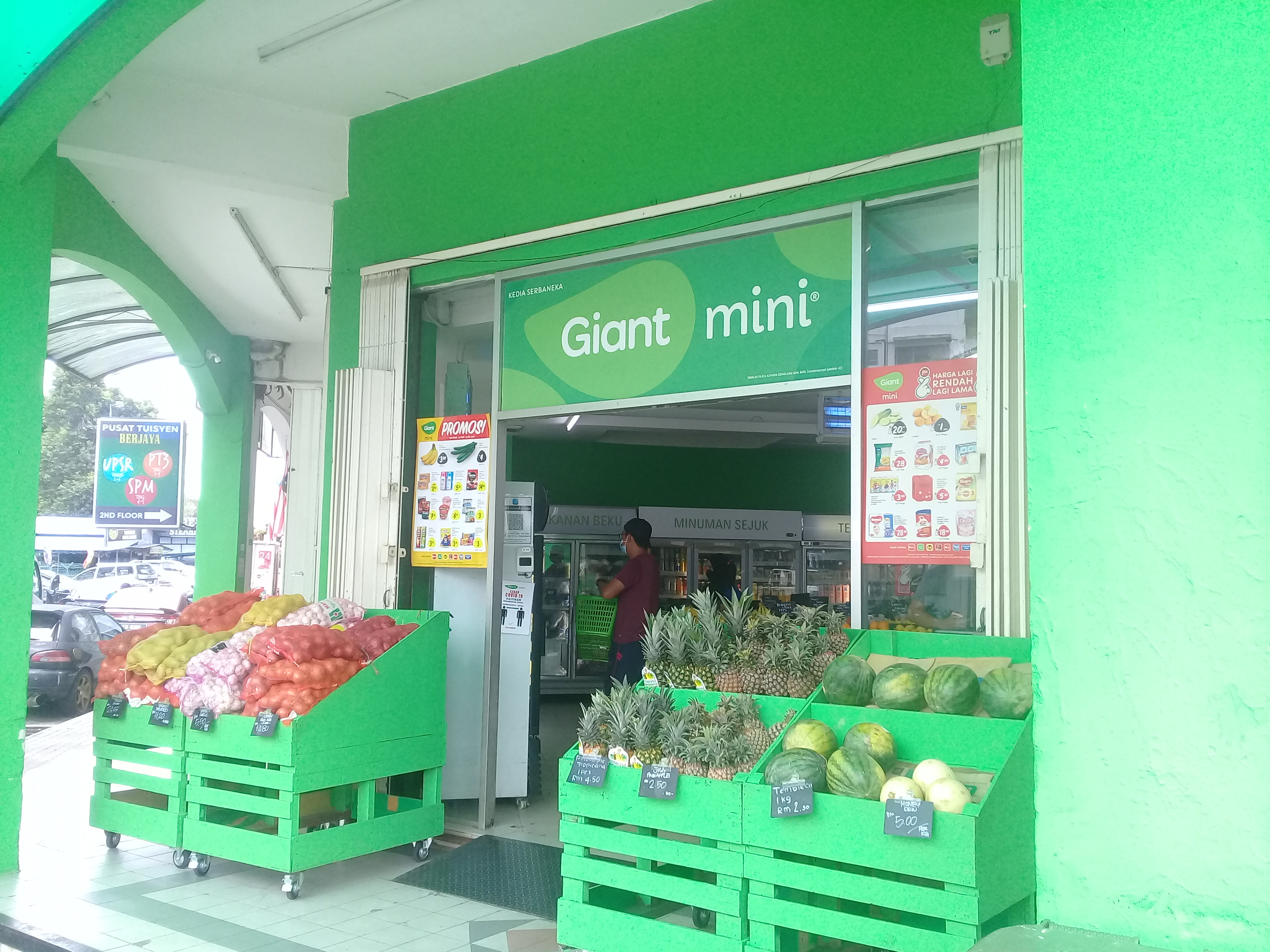
A Giant Mini outlet in Kota Damansara

Giant was founded in 1944 as a small grocery store in Kuala Lumpur and expanded with the opening of the Teng Minimarket Centre (TMC) in Bangsar in 1974. In 1999, Dairy Farm International Holdings bought a 90% interest in the chain, with the Teng family retaining the balance. By 2003, the holding company for the chain had changed its name to Dairy Farm Giant Retail Sdn Bhd, and the chain had eight Giant hypermarkets and 10 supermarkets as well as three Cold Storage supermarkets. Later, the company operated as a subsidiary of Dairy Farm International Holdings Limited and the name was changed to GCH Retail (Malaysia) Sdn Bhd.

GCH Retail was 30%-owned by Syarikat Pesaka Antah Sdn Bhd — a company controlled by the Negeri Sembilan royal family and balance 70% by DFI Mauritius Ltd.

In December 2011, Giant expanded into Vietnam. However, in February 2018, the Group disposed of its 100% interest in Asia Investment Supermarket Trading Co. Ltd. (AISTC), operating a hypermarket in Vietnam to Auchan Retail Vietnam, for net cash inflow of US$6.4 million. As such, the Group has exited from supermarket and hypermarket business in Vietnam.

Beginning 2017, Giant and its peers in the hypermarket retail segment in Malaysia had been underperforming due to high operational costs, weakening consumer spending, and stiffer competition from smaller supermarkets, retailers and e-commerce. In 2019, it closed at least six outlets in Peninsular Malaysia operations. It comprises 2 hypermarkets and 2 Cold Storage outlets in Selangor, 1 each in Kedah, Perak, and Kuala Lumpur. While exiting totally from Sabah and Sarawak. There had about 16 stores in both of the states which they transferred the business to local stores as new owners rather than closing them permanently. In 2020, Many branches would be replaced by TF Value-Mart or NSK Trade City.

Similar downsize also observed in Singapore with the closure of two stores located at Bukit Panjang and Jalan Tenteram in Whampoa estate, and its VivoCity hypermarket in 2019. It also closed its Parkway Parade hypermarket on 29 February 2020.

In May 2021, Giant announced its withdrawal from Indonesia since 31 July 2021. Some branches would be replaced with Hero Supermarket and IKEA small stores. Hero is previously owned by the DFI Retail Group, as it was spun off in 2024.

=== Rebranding ===
On 24 September 2020, Giant Singapore announced that it would be undertaking a rebranding exercise, introducing a new logo and new features to its stores. It will also lower prices of daily essentials by 20% average for six months, following NTUC FairPrice's decision to lower prices in order to support Singaporeans during the COVID-19 pandemic.

The rebranding of Giant's logo was extended to Malaysia in April 2021. As part of transformation, Giant introduces a section known as “Ringgit Zone” which has priced its products fixed at RM3 per item for bargain hunters.

Both ShopSmart & G-Ekspres are being rebranded as Giant Mini.

=== New owner ===
On 23 February 2023, Giant's operator Dairy Farm announced that it was exiting the grocery retail market in Malaysia, citing increasing competition. Dairy Farm's grocery business in Malaysia was sold to Macrovalue Sdn Bhd led by Andrew Lim Tatt Keong, a local businessman and entrepreneur. Dairy Farm, however, would still remain the operator of the Cold Storage and Giant franchise in Singapore until 2025, where it will be sold to Macrovalue Pte Ltd in March 2025.

Following the acquisition, Macrovalue announced that Giant Hypermarket in both Singapore and Malaysia will be rebranded as Giant Mall as the parent company attempts to attract more foot traffic and cut down losses.

== See also ==
- List of hypermarkets in Malaysia
- List of companies in Malaysia
