= 3hreeSixty =

Hong Kong food retailer

- Type: Privately owned company
- Industry: Supermarket
- Founded: 2006; 20 years ago
- Headquarters: Hong Kong
- Area served: Hong Kong
- Parent: Dairy Farm International Holdings
- Website: www.3hreesixtyhk.com

Former brand

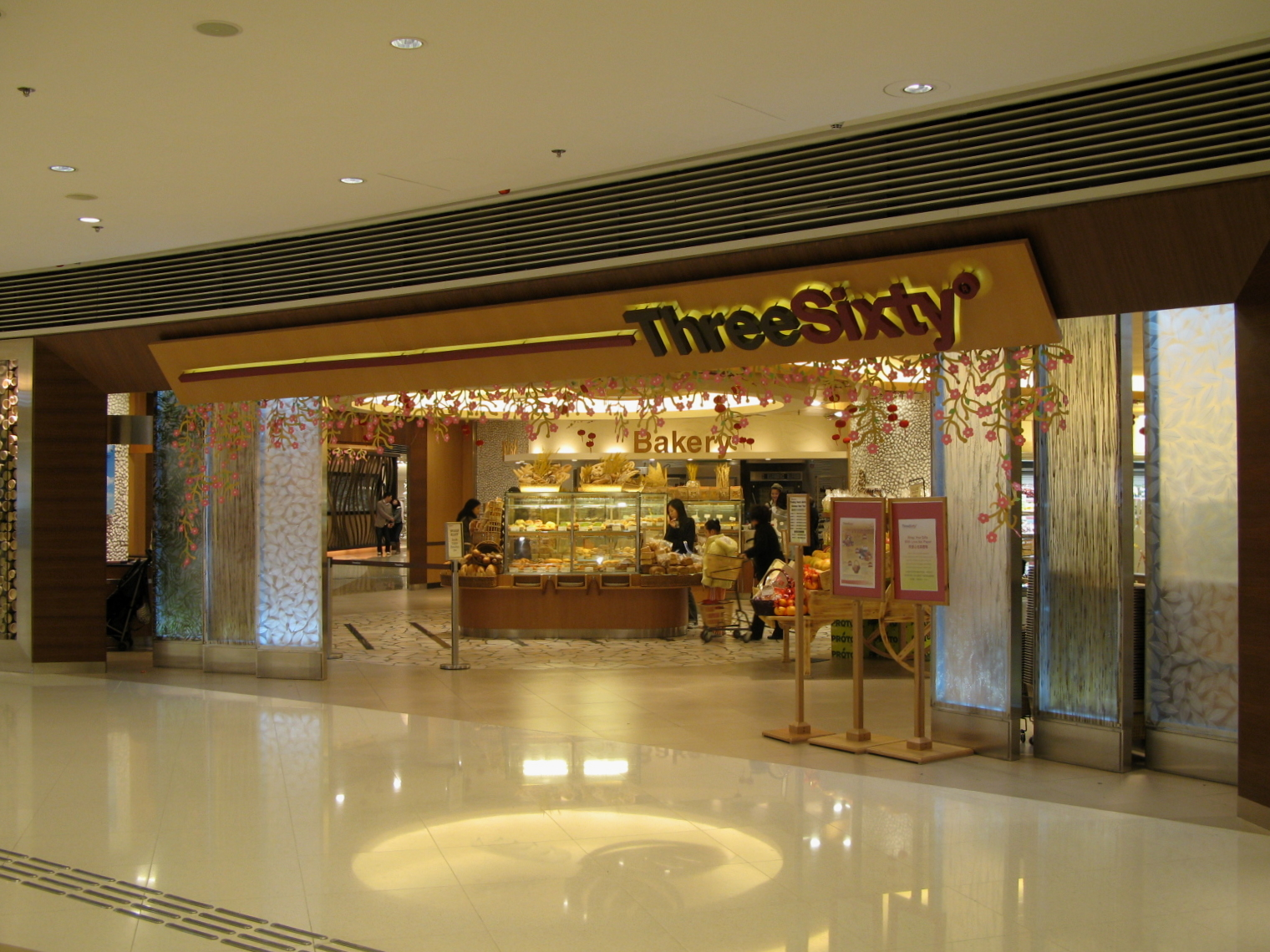
ThreeSixty store in Elements

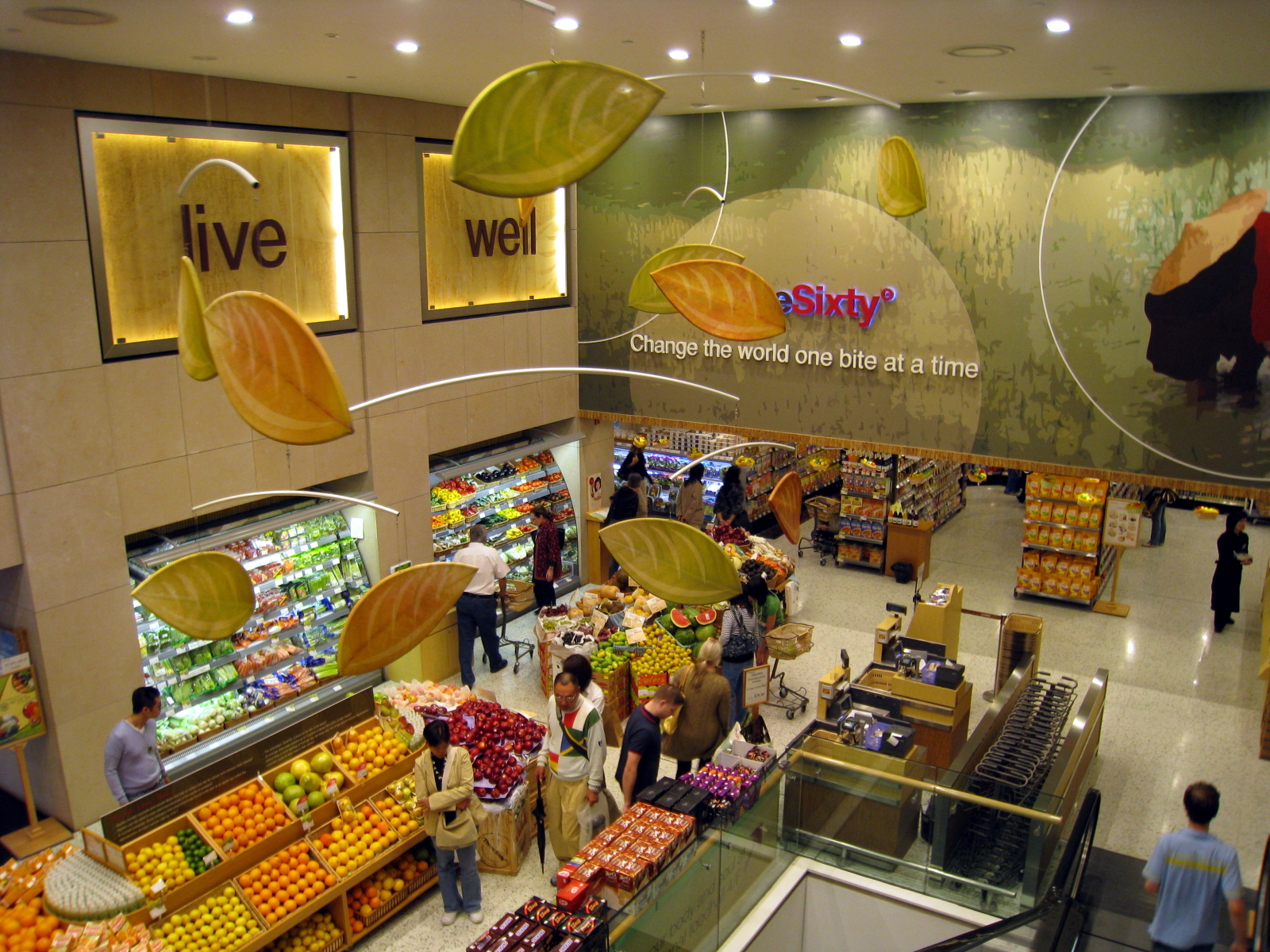
ThreeSixty store in The Landmark (Closed in 2013)

3hreeSixty, stylised in logos as "3hreesixty" (the company name is Three Sixty Limited), is a Hong Kong retailer of natural foods and organic foods. It is a member of Dairy Farm group. It offers earth friendly household products, non-chemically based personal care items and wellness-related lifestyle products. Its target customers are middle class families and its retail prices are higher than other supermarkets.

== Shops ==
There are currently two 3hreeSixty stores in Hong Kong.

- Elements, Union Square, Kowloon station, Tsim Sha Tsui, Kowloon, opened in 2007
- Stanley Plaza, Stanley, opened in 2017.

Former stores

- The Landmark, Central, Hong Kong, opened in 2006 and closed permanently on 25 February 2013.
