= Mannings =

Hong Kong healthcare retailer

- Industry: retail
- Headquarters: Hong Kong,
- Parent: DFI Retail Group
- Website: mannings.com.hk

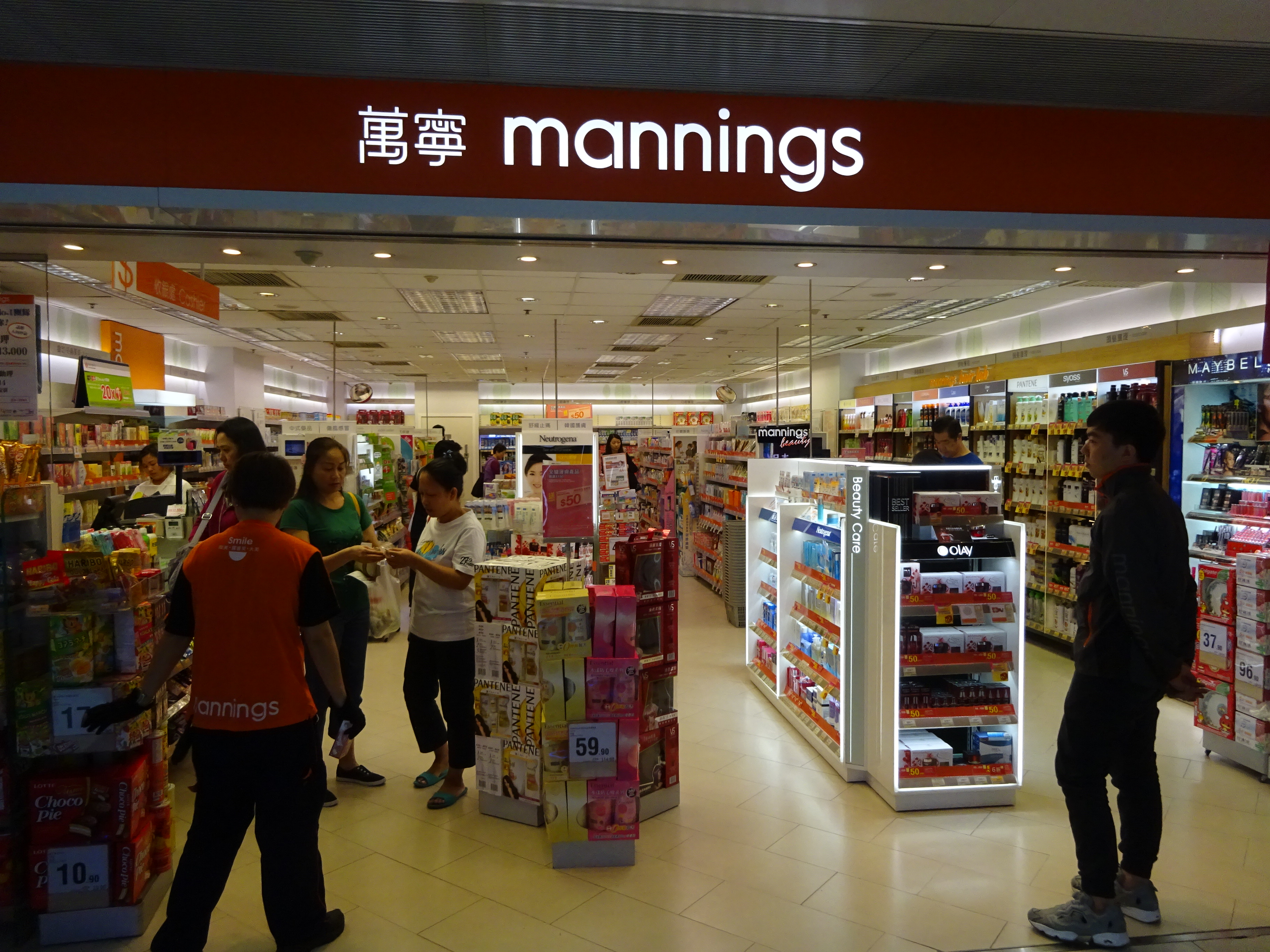
Mannings shop in Hong Kong

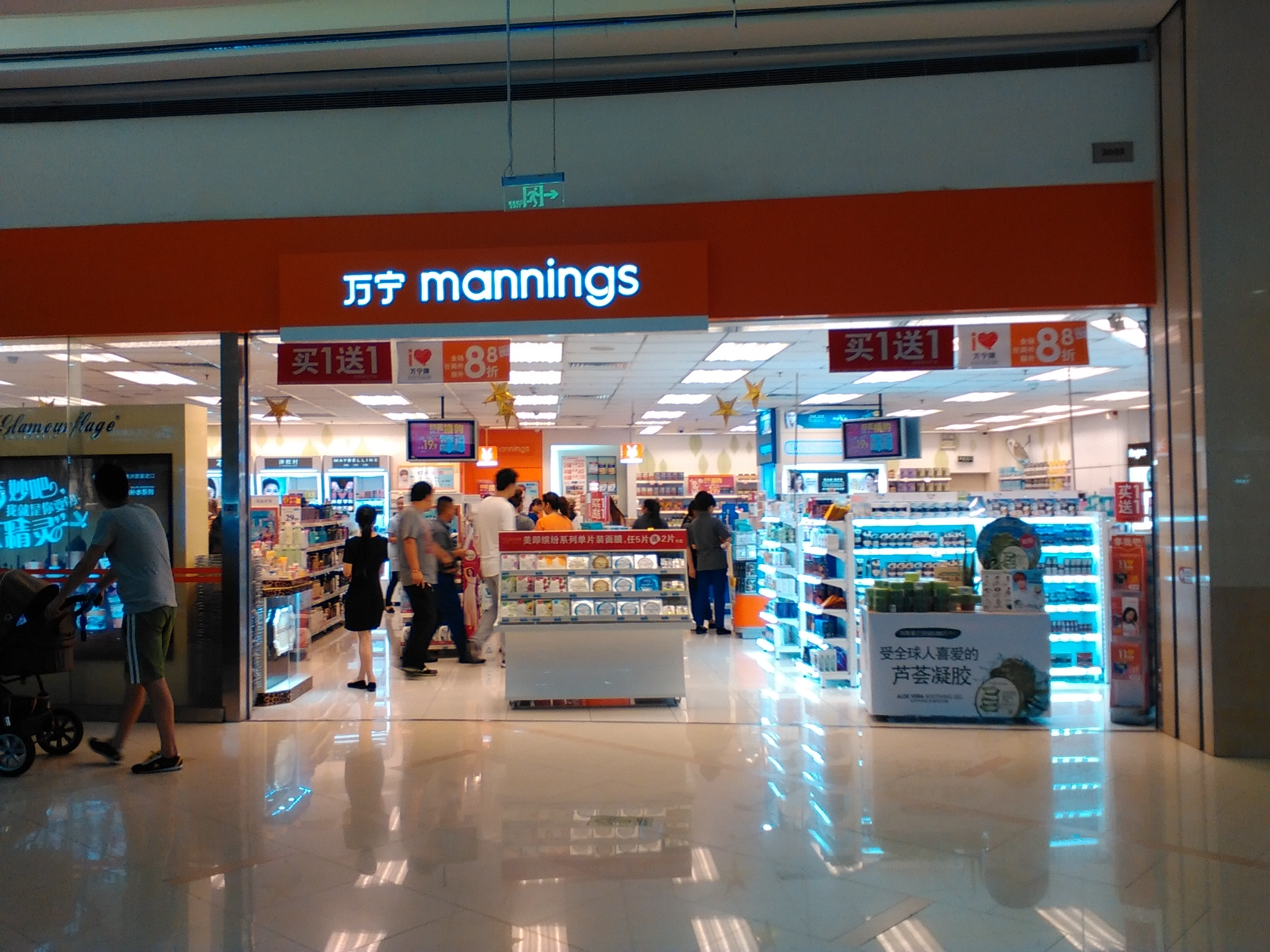
Mannings shop in Suzhou, mainland China

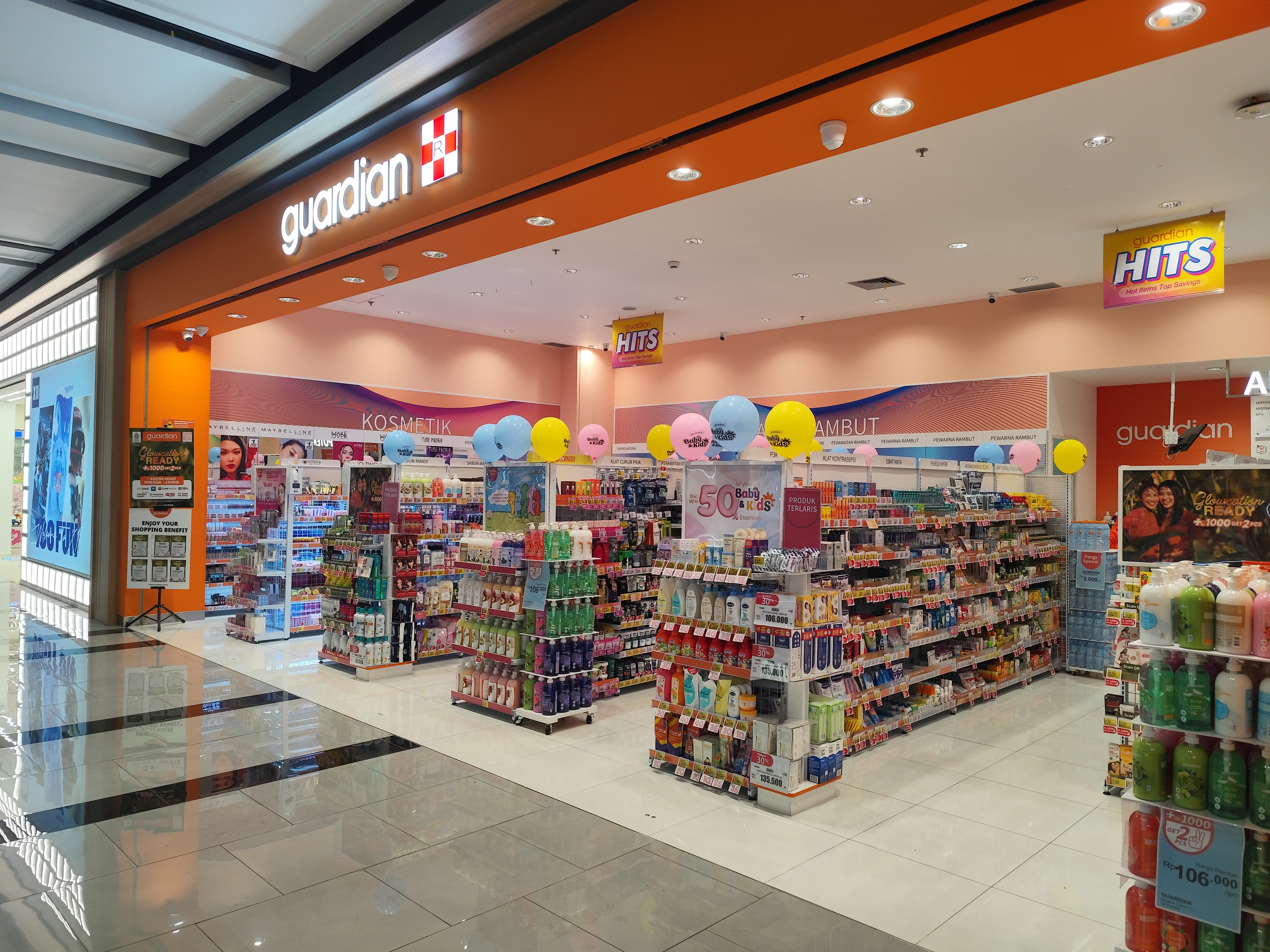
Guardian shop in Cikarang, Indonesia

Mannings (traditional Chinese: 萬寧; simplified Chinese: 万宁; pinyin: Wànníng; Jyutping: maan6 ning4) is a personal care product chain owned by Dairy Farm International Holdings, which is in turn owned by Jardine Matheson. It is known as Guardian (佳寕; 佳宁; Jiānìng; gaai1 ning4) in Malaysia, Indonesia, Brunei, Thailand, Vietnam, and Singapore. By the end of 2016, there were 1715 stores in Asia, 355 in Hong Kong, 17 in Macau, 228 in Mainland China, 425 in Malaysia, 245 in Indonesia, 23 in Brunei, 47 in Vietnam, 126 in Singapore, 26 in Thailand, 123 in Taiwan, 5 in Cambodia, and 246 in the Philippines. The total income of Mannings in 2017 was US$2.8 billion. Its major rivals include Watsons which is owned by CK Hutchison Holdings.

With more than 350 outlets, Mannings is Hong Kong's largest health and beauty product chain store providing health care, personal care, skin care and baby products.
