= China Resources Vanguard =

Chinese supermarket chain

China Resources Vanguard Company Limited 华润万家超级市场有限公司
- Logo on refurbished stores

- Former logo, still used on unrefurbished stores
- Type: State-owned enterprise
- Industry: Supermarket
- Founded: 14 February 1984; 42 years ago
- Headquarters: Shenzhen, Guangdong, China
- Area served: China
- Key people: Chen Lang (chairman); Hong Jie (CEO); Chen Shuo (COO); Qin Dongsheng (VP); Wang Weiyong; Lan Yi; Tang Hongtao; Min (CFO)
- Products: Food, beverages, and daily necessities
- Number of employees: 14500 (Hong Kong accounts for 1000)
- Parent: China Resources Holdings
- Website: www.crv.com.cn

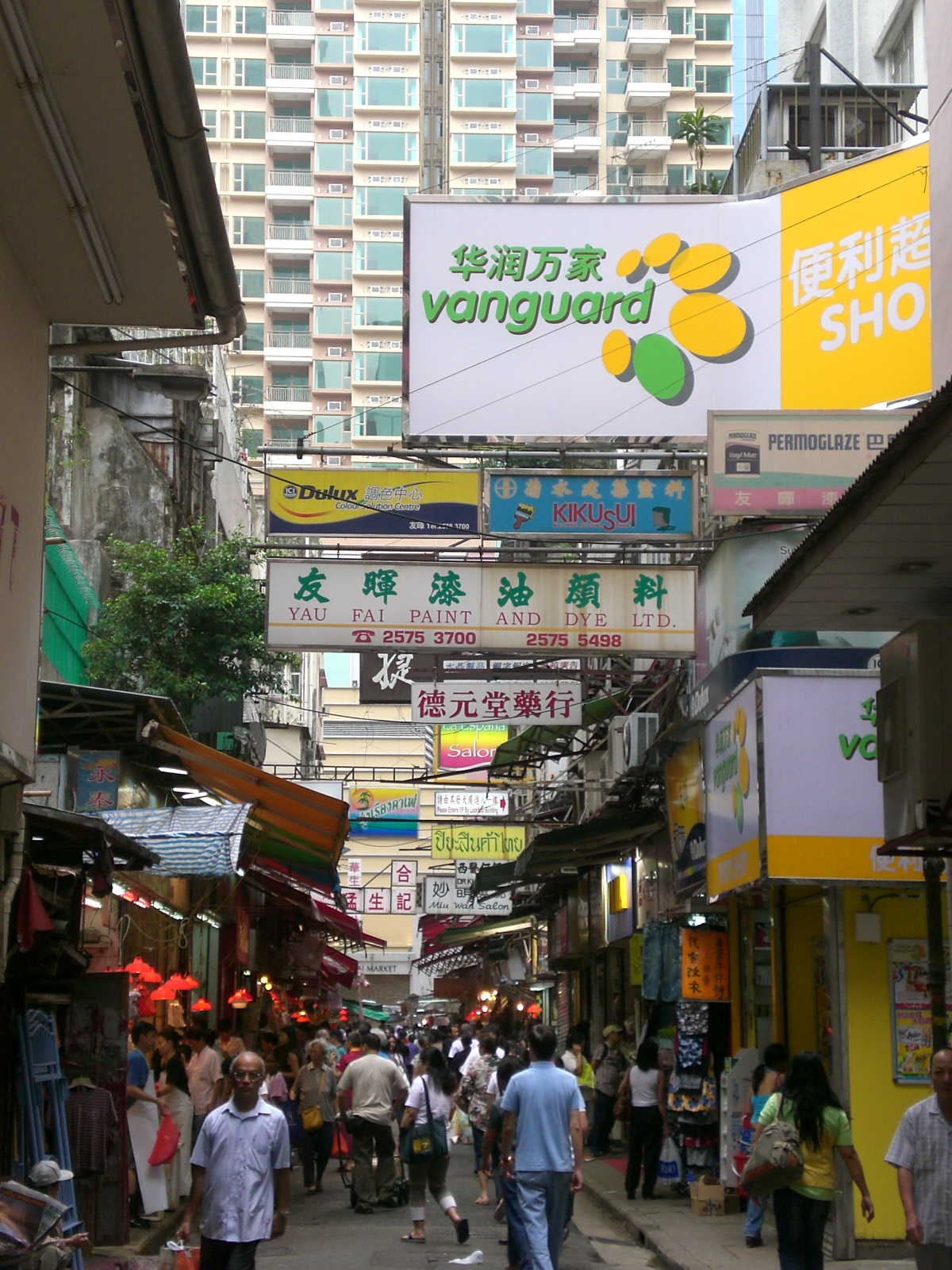
Vanguard in Wan Chai, Hong Kong

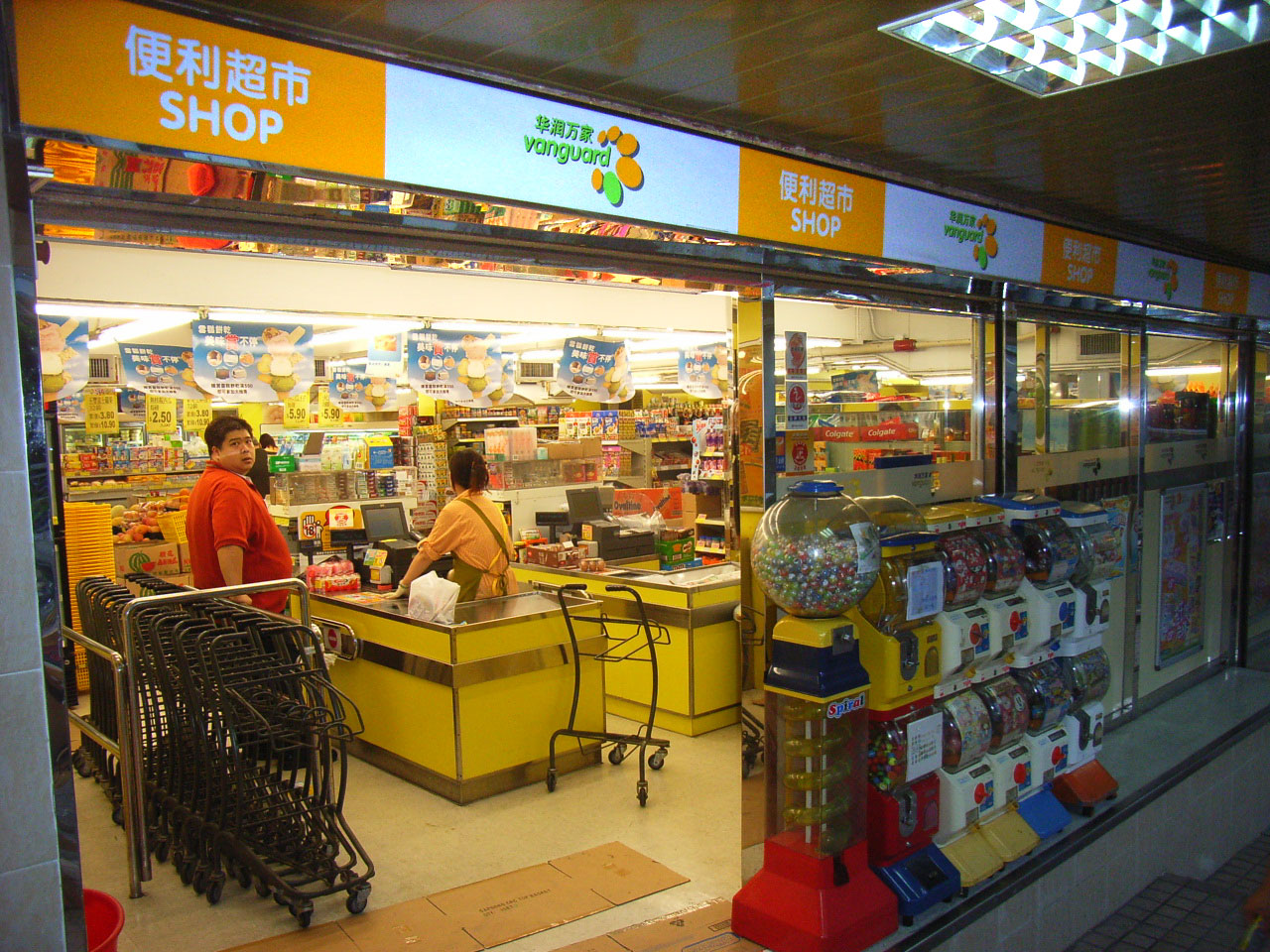
Vanguard in North Point, Hong Kong

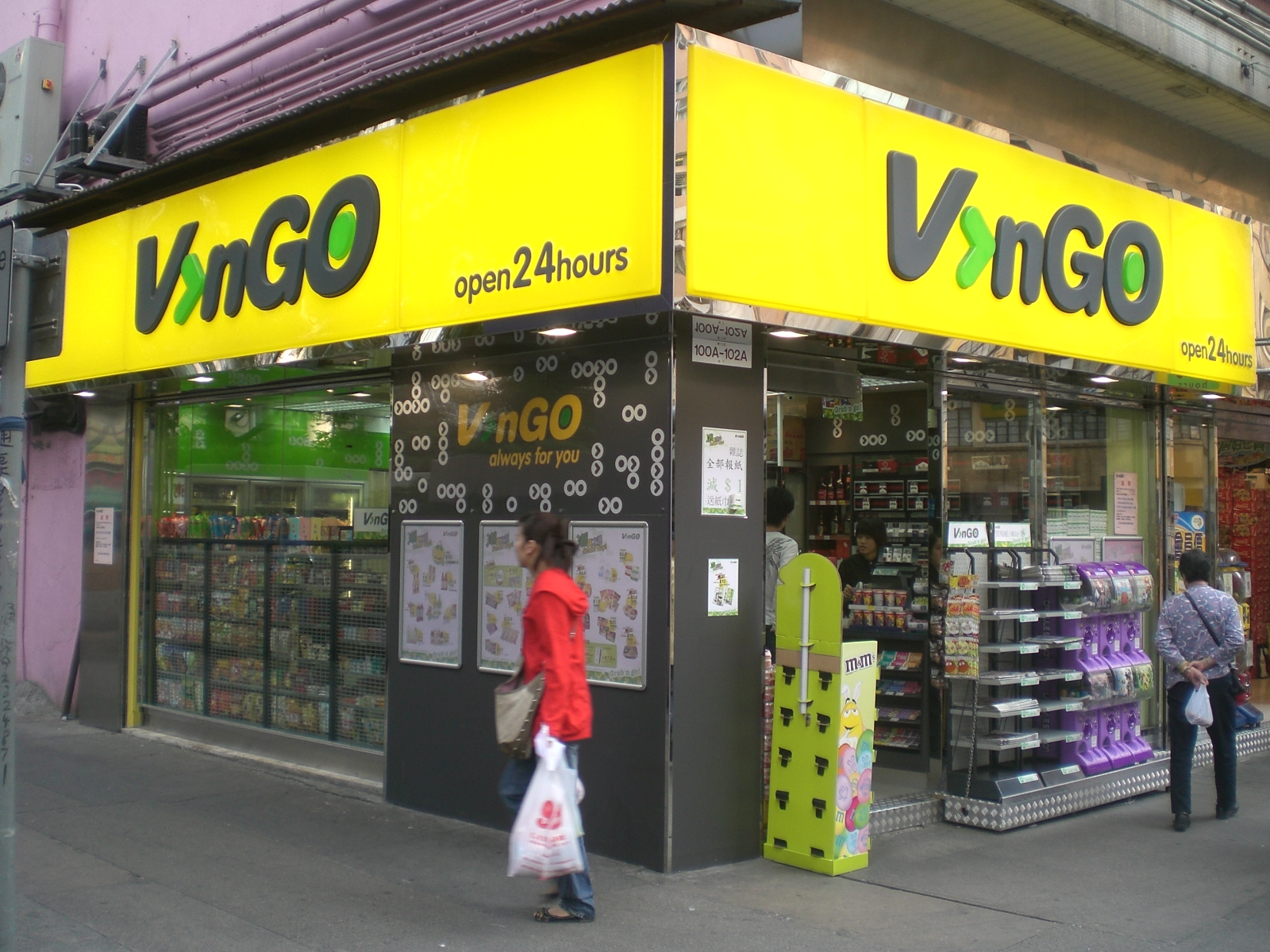
VanGO convenience store in Shau Kei Wan, Hong Kong

China Resources Vanguard, doing business as China Resources Vanguard Shop or Vanguard (simplified Chinese: 华润万家; traditional Chinese: 華潤萬家; pinyin: huá rùn wàn jiā; Jyutping: waa4 jeon6 maan6 gaa1), operates the supermarket chains of China Resources. It was the third-largest supermarket chain in Hong Kong. As of 31 December 2014, there are 4866 shops operating in the Chinese provinces/municipalities of Guangdong, Zhejiang, Jiangsu, Shanghai, Tianjin and Beijing.

On 18 August 2013, China Resources Enterprise's supermarket chain Vanguard and British supermarket Tesco signed a "memorandum of understanding", intending to set up a joint venture interest group in mainland China, Hong Kong and Macau, operating hypermarkets, supermarkets, convenience stores, liquor stores and cash and carry businesses. China Resources Enterprise took an 80% share and Tesco took a 20% share.

== History ==
- 1984: China Resources Supermarket (CR Supermarket), former name of China Resources Vanguard, was founded.
- 1991: CR Supermarket opened its first store in Mainland China.
- 2001: China Resources acquired a 72% stake in Shenzhen Vanguard Super Department Store. China Resources Supermarket merged with Shenzhen Vanguard Super Department Store.
- 2002: China Resources fully acquired Shenzhen Vanguard Super Department Store and renamed it as China Resources Vanguard Shop.
- 2005: Introduction of new sunflower logo.
- 2007: China Resources Holdings acquired Tianjin company China Resources Supermarket Chain.
- 2010: The first blt boutique supermarket opened.
- 2012: Vanguard launched new brand "V+ urban boutique supermarkets".
- 2013: Set up joint venture with Tesco.
- 2015: Sale of supermarket business to improve the performance of China Resources Enterprise. Opened first U Select by Tesco store in Hong Kong.

== Brands ==
=== Mainland China ===
- Vanguard - standard supermarkets
- Ole' - upmarket supermarket with a focus on imported food
- blt - upmarket supermarket with a focus on fresh food, styled as a farm market
- blt Express - smaller blt stores
- VanGO - convenience stores
- 乐购 express - former Tesco Express stores
- Voi_la! - wine cellar
- V+ - upmarket urban boutique supermarket aimed at China's growing middle class

=== Hong Kong (former operations) ===
- Vanguard - standard supermarkets
- VanGO - convenience stores
- U Select - stores with at least one third Tesco products
- Voi_la! - wine cellar
