= Kazuo Wada =

Japanese businessman (1929–2019)

Kazuo Wada (和田 一夫, Wada Kazuo; 1929 – 19 August 2019) was a Japanese businessman, the effective founder and chairman of the defunct multinational supermarket and department store chain Yaohan (八百半). He took over his parents' small grocery chain in the 1950s and spent the next four decades growing Yaohan into a global company with annual sales of 500 billion yen at its peak. However, Yaohan was unable to sustain its heavy loss and debt burden during the 1997 Asian financial crisis and declared bankruptcy. Almost penniless, Wada spent his later life running a consultancy for young Japanese entrepreneurs.

== Early life ==
Kazuo Wada was born in 1929 in Atami, Shizuoka Prefecture, a hot springs resort near Tokyo. He was the son of Ryohei and Katsu Wada, who opened a grocery store in Atami a year after his birth. In the difficult years after World War II, his mother Katsu defeated the odds to turn the family business into a success, and reportedly inspired the popular Japanese television series Oshin.

== Career ==
Wada graduated from the Faculty of Economics of Nihon University in 1951, and later took over the family business from his mother. He grew the grocery chain into a chain of department stores, and became President of Yaohan in 1962. He later brought the company public on the Tokyo Stock Exchange.

In 1971, Wada opened the first overseas Yaohan store in São Paulo, Brazil, and began an aggressive series of international expansion, which coincided with the rapid growth of Japan's own economy. In 1974, he opened the first Yaohan store in Singapore at Plaza Singapura, and later added branches in Katong and Jurong.

Wada moved Yaohan's headquarters from Japan to Hong Kong in 1989. He bought the Skyhigh, a mansion on top of the Victoria Peak, as his residence, at a price of HK$85 million.

In 1995, Yaohan opened its Shanghai department store, which was the largest in Asia. At its peak, the company had branches in 16 countries in Asia, Europe, and North and South America, with annual sales of 500 billion yen.

== Bankruptcy ==
Wada financed Yaohan's rapid growth largely by taking on a massive amount of debt. In 1997, when Japan's asset bubble had burst and the Asian financial crisis hit East and Southeast Asia, Yaohan incurred major losses and was unable to refinance its debt.

In September 1997, Yaohan filed for bankruptcy with liabilities of 160 billion yen (US$1.5 billion); it was at the time Japan's largest post-war corporate failure. Yaohan Japan was restructured by Jusco and later renamed as MaxValu Tokai in 2002. Wada was forced to sell his Hong Kong mansion for HK$375 million.

== Later life ==
After Yaohan's bankruptcy, Wada became almost penniless, surviving only on his pension. To avoid the media, he lived at a relative's home for a while. He spent his time reading biographies of world leaders such as Deng Xiaoping, which inspired him to turn around his life and put his lessons to good use. In 2000, he founded a management consulting company in Iizuka, Fukuoka, aiming to help young entrepreneurs deal with failure, which is stigmatized in Japan.

On 19 August 2019, Wada died at his home in Izunokuni, Shizuoka Prefecture, aged 90. He was married to Kimiko.
