= New Yaohan =

Department store in Macau, China

New Yaohan 新八佰伴 Novo Yaohan
- Company type: Department store
- Founded: 1992 (as Macau branch of Yaohan); September 18, 1997 (as New Yaohan)
- Headquarters: Macau, China
- Number of locations: 5 (1 main store and 4 outlets)
- Key people: Stanley Ho, Kazuo Wada
- Parent: Sociedade de Turismo e Diversões de Macau
- Website: www.newyaohan.com

New Yaohan (Chinese: 新八佰伴, Portuguese: Novo Yaohan) is a department store in Macau, China. It was established on September 18, 1997, from the Macau branch of Yaohan, which was the first department store on the island. New Yaohan is a fully owned subsidiary company of Sociedade de Turismo e Diversões de Macau (STDM). The store is located on Avenida Dr. Mário Soares, Praia Grande, with one outlet store in Outer Harbour Ferry Terminal.

== History ==
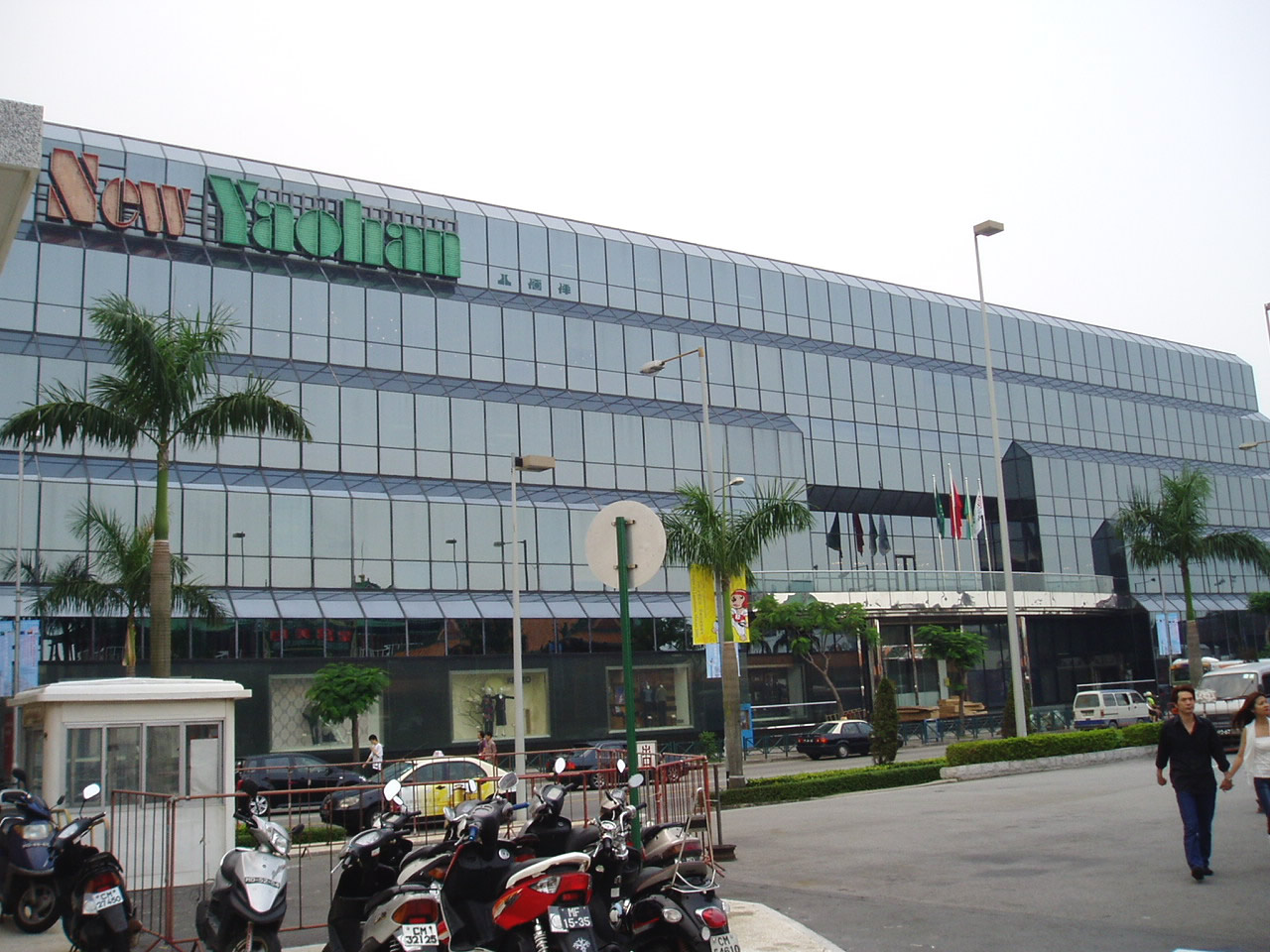
The original building of New Yaohan till 2008 since the establishment in 1992

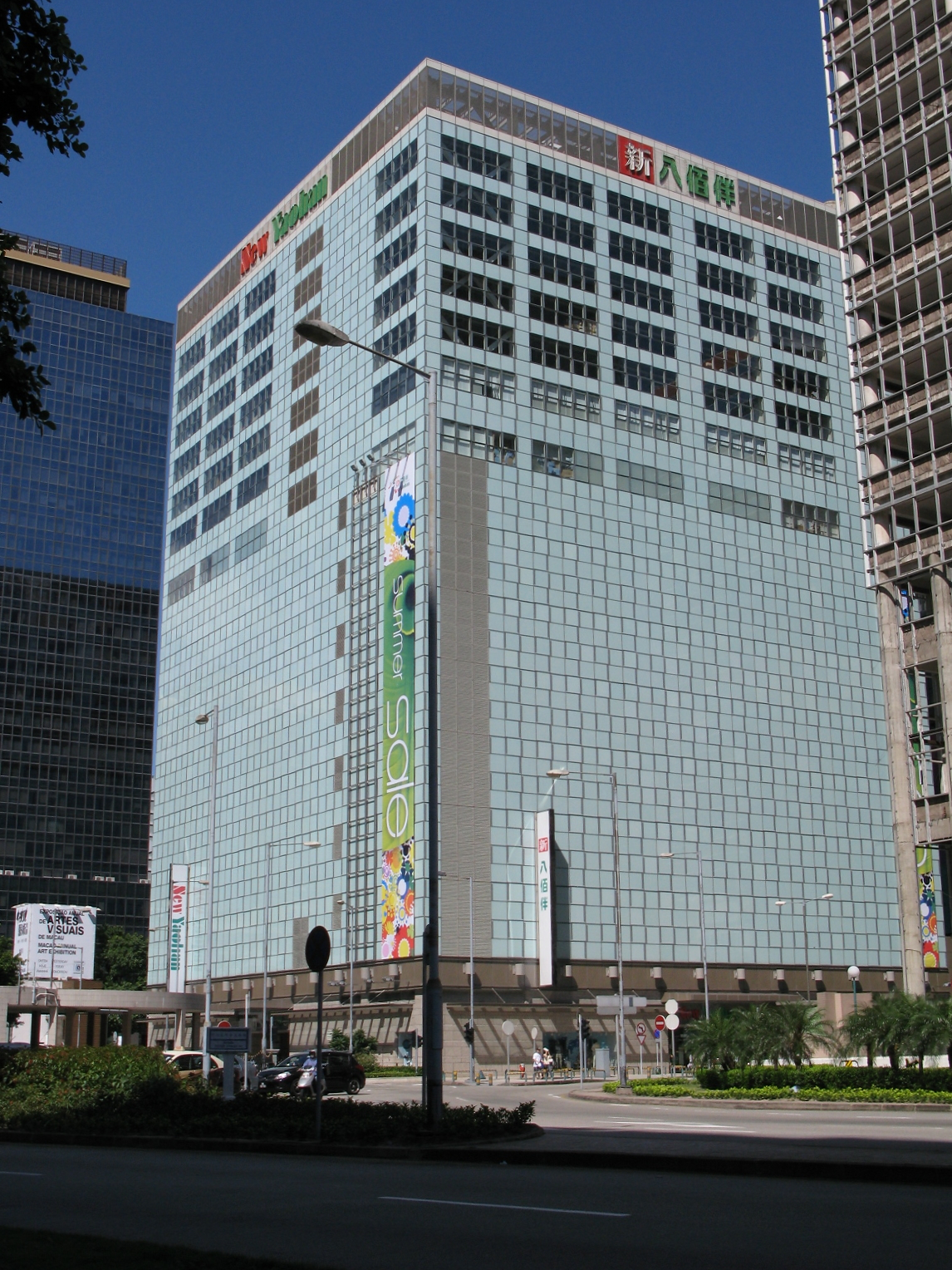
The new site building opened in 2008

The Japanese retail group Yaohan established a branch store in Macau which was located on Avenida da Amizade, next to Jai Alai Casino (Chinese: 回力娛樂場, Portuguese: Casino Jai Alai) in 1992; at the time of its opening, the store was the first department store in Macau. As Kazuo Wada, the director-general of Yaohan Japan, announced that the group was filing for bankruptcy on September 18, 1997, Panda Sociedade de Gestão de Investimentos Limitada, a subsidiary company of Sociedade de Turismo e Diversões de Macau and Shun Tak Holdings, purchased the ownership of the branch store of Yaohan. Then, STDM established a subsidiary company called New Yaohan Department Store (Chinese: 新八佰伴百貨, Portuguese: Nova loja de departamentos Yaohan) for related operations, and re-opened the department store with a new name: New Yaohan.

In 2005, STDM announced it intended to demolish the New Yaohan store building and rebuild it as Oceanus (回力海立方娛樂場), the contingency development plan of its casino subsidiary Sociedade de Jogos de Macau in 2005. The New Yaohan store was then moved from Avenida da Amizade to a new site on Avenida Dr. Mário Soares, which was opposite to the old Judicial Court of Macau. As part of the moving process, the store at the original site was closed on August 2, 2008, and the new site on opened on August 8, 2008.

New Yaohan Department Store invests 30 million patacas for the outlet store known as New Yaohan Outlet (Chinese: 新八佰伴Outlet, Portuguese: Outlet do Novo Yaohan) on the third floor of the Outer Harbour Ferry Terminal which has an area of 11,000 square feet and it was opened on March 22, 2010. New Yaohan also manages several different brands as outlet stores in The Venetian Macao, Four Seasons Hotel Macao and One Central.
