= Ministop =

Japanese convenience store chain

Ministop Co., Ltd.
- Ministop's logo, the "Housemark"

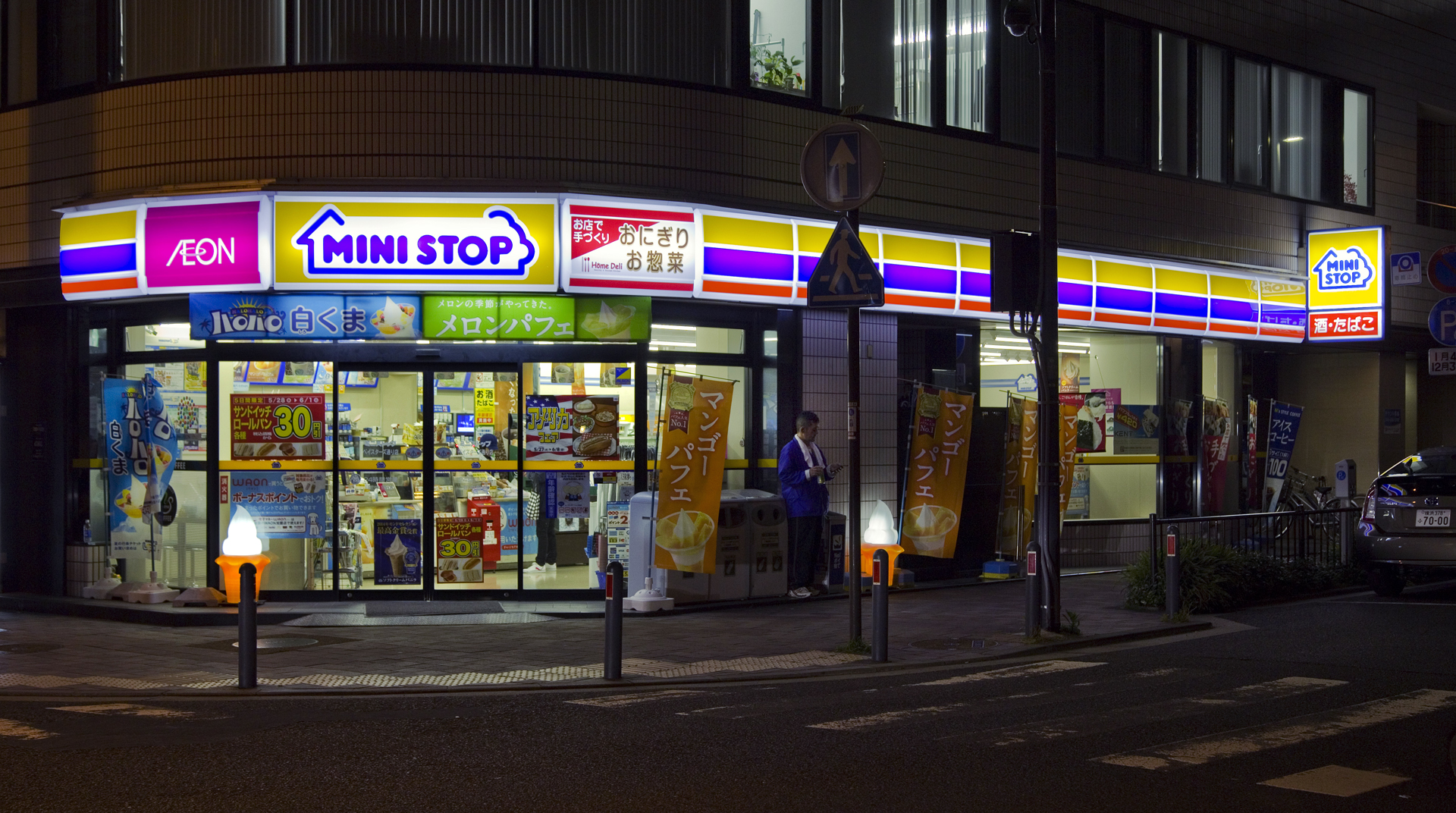
- A Ministop store in Yokohama, Japan
- Native name: ミニストップ株式会社
- Romanized name: Minisutoppu kabushiki gaisha
- Company type: Public
- Traded as: TYO: 9946
- Industry: Retail (convenience stores)
- Founded: May 21, 1980; 46 years ago
- Headquarters: AEON Tower, Mihama-ku, Chiba, Japan
- Number of locations: 2,045 stores (Jan 31 2023)
- Number of employees: 938 (2018)
- Parent: AEON Group (53.8%): AEON Co. (48.43%); Cox Co. (2.36%); ÆON Financial Services Co. (1.39%); MaxValu Nishinihon Co. (1.35%)
- Website: ministop.co.jp

Ministop Co., Ltd. (ミニストップ株式会社, Minisutoppu Kabushiki-gaisha) (TYO: 9946), a member of AEON, operates the Ministop convenience store franchise chain in Japan. Unlike most other convenience stores in Japan, Ministop stores feature a kitchen that prepares sandwiches, snacks and take out bento boxes on demand, and has a seating area where customers can sit down and eat immediately.

== Products ==
The usual Japanese convenience store goods are available, such as magazines, manga comic books, soft drinks, contraceptives, onigiri; services include bill payment, photocopying, ticket purchase for events and ATM access. Ministop also has its own unique brand of fast food. The menu varies according to season and periodical promotions. A typical selection might include hot dogs, sandwiches, frozen desserts such as their flagship soft serve ice cream, kariman and chūkaman—baozi-style buns with various fillings.

== International operations ==
As of 2024, Ministop operates 164 stores in Vietnam, and is currently the only operation outside Japan.

== Former operations ==
Ministop also operated in China and Kazakhstan.

=== South Korea ===
The first Ministop store in South Korea opened in November 1990 in Mok-dong, as a joint-venture with Daesang Corporation; Ministop bought Daesang's stake in the venture in 2003. As of October 2017, there were 2418 operating Ministop stores.https://minstop.com/

In January 2022, Lotte Corporation acquired the entire stake of Ministop Korea Co. for 313.37 billion won ($263 million). All the Ministop store were gradually converted to 7-Eleven after acquisition.

=== Philippines ===
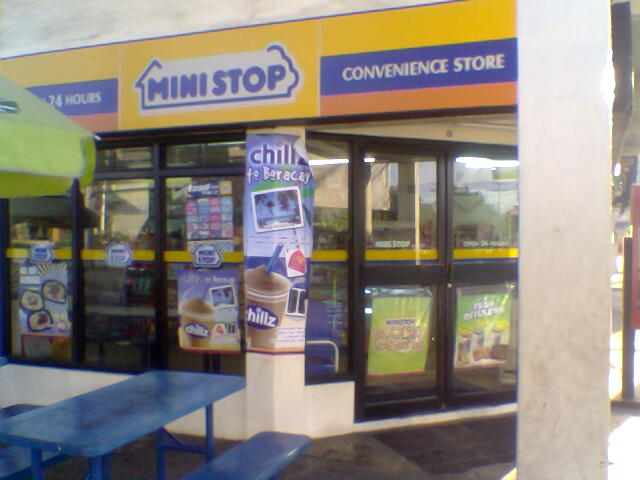
A Ministop store in Angeles City, Philippines

In December of 2000, the Japan-based convenience store chain Ministop made its way to the Philippines, being brought to the country by Robinsons Retail Holdings, Inc. in partnership with Ministop Japan and Mitsubishi Corporation. In January 2022, Robinsons Group assumed full ownership of the Ministop business in the Philippines with 460 branches. It was announced that the stores would be rebranded as Uncle John's, after the flagship fried chicken product sold in the Philippine market since 2006.
