= Blue Grass (company) =

Blue Grass Co., Ltd.
- Trade name: BLUE GRASS
- Native name: 株式会社ブルーグラス
- Type: Kabushiki gaisha
- Traded as: JASDAQ: 7478
- Predecessor: Matsusaka New Department Store Co., Ltd. (株式会社松阪ニューデパート)
- Founded: September 18, 1948
- Headquarters: NTT Makuhari Building, 14th Floor, 1-6 Nakase, Mihama-ku, Chiba, Chiba Prefecture, Japan
- Key people: Yasushi Kimura, President and Representative Director
- Revenue: ¥20.6 billion (FY ended February 2010)
- Total assets: ¥12.0 billion (2010)
- Total equity: ¥8.1 billion (2010)
- Owner: Aeon Co., Ltd. (67.78%)
- Parent: Aeon Co., Ltd.
- Footnotes; Data as of immediately before the merger.

Blue Grass is a retail brand operated by Cox Co., Ltd..

== Overview ==
In September 1984, Blue Grass Co., Ltd. was established.

In February 1995, the company was absorbed into Matsusaka New Department Store Co., Ltd. (formerly New Department Daikai) for the purpose of changing the par value of its shares. In November of the same year, its shares were registered for over-the-counter trading.

In September 2000, the company acquired the operating rights to 120 stores from Mels Co., Ltd., a women's apparel subsidiary of Taka-Q.

Blue Grass operated as a specialty apparel retailer within the Aeon Group. However, on August 21, 2010, it was merged into Cox Co., Ltd., another Æon Group apparel retailer, and the corporate entity "Blue Grass" ceased to exist. Since then, "BLUE GRASS" has continued as a store brand operated by Cox.

== See also ==
- Aeon Group
