= Avenida Doutor Mário Soares =

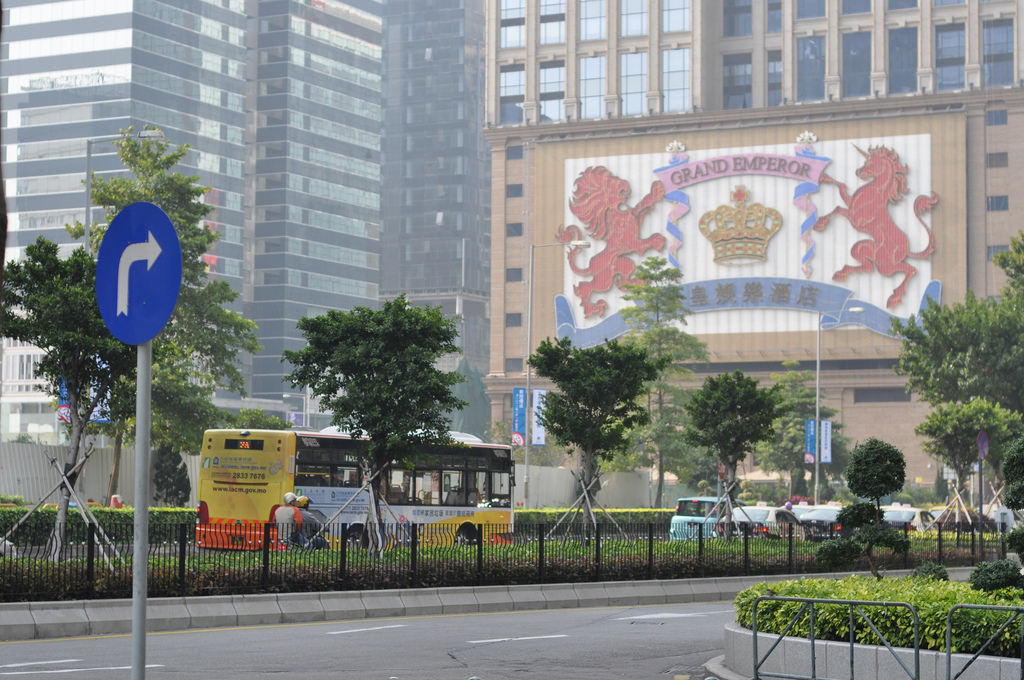
- Grand Emperor Hotel & Casino as seen from Avenida Doutor Mário Soares
- Native name: 蘇亞利斯博士大馬路 (Chinese)
- Length: 350 m (1,150 ft)
- Location: Macau, China

Avenida Doutor Mário Soares
- Traditional Chinese: 蘇亞利斯博士大馬路
Transcriptions
Standard Mandarin
- Hanyu Pinyin: Sūyǎlì sī bóshì dà mǎlù
Yue: Cantonese
- Jyutping: sou1aa3lei6 si1 bok3si6 daai6 maa5lou6

Avenida Doutor Mário Soares (Chinese: 蘇亞利斯博士大馬路) is a multi-lane street at the southern end of the Macau Peninsula terminating at Praça Ferreira Amaral.

== Naming ==
The street Alameda Avenida Doutor Mário Soares was named after Mário Soares, Prime Minister of Portugal from 1976 to 1978 and from 1983 to 1985.

== Major buildings ==
Amongst others, the Grand Emperor Hotel & Casino, the F.I.T. Center of Macau and the Lakeview Tower apartment building are located at this street, though their official entrance lobbies is on the opposite side facing Avenida Comercial de Macau. The New Yaohan shopping mall and the Bank of China Building, Macau have their official address at this avenue.

At the southern end of the street, the Praça Ferreira Amaral roundabout and the Ponte Governador Nobre de Carvalho bridge are located.

== See also ==
- List of roads in Macau

== Gallery ==
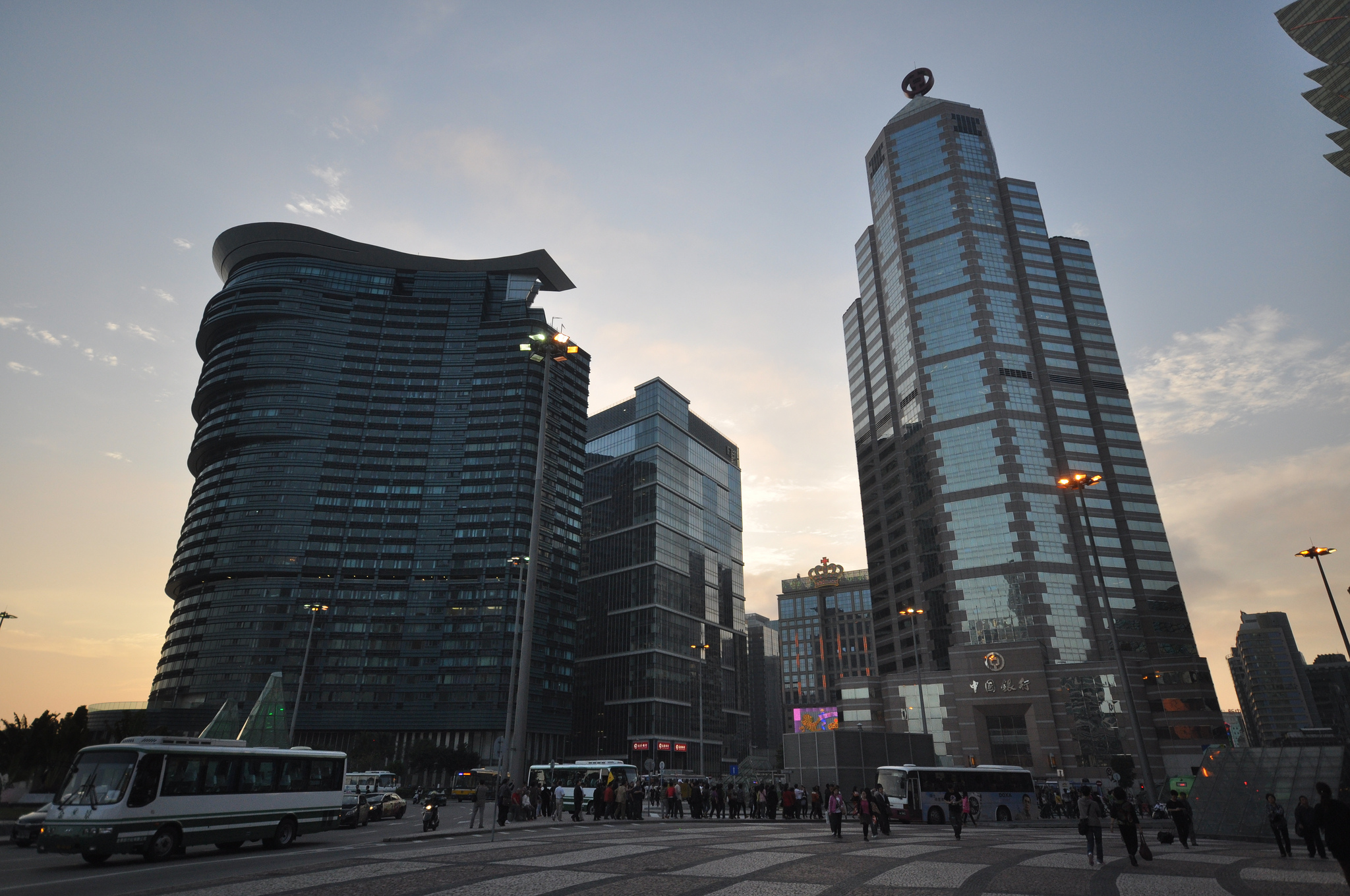
Lakeview Tower, F.I.T. Building, Grand Emperor Hotel and Bank of China Building as seen from Praca Ferreira Amaral. Avenida Doutor Mário Soares is located between these buildings in the background.
