= List of roads in Macau =

This is an incomplete list of roads in Macau.

Roads in Macau use Portuguese spelling and are named after historic figures or places in Macau or Portugal. There are 321 kilometres of roads in Macau maintained by the Land and Urban Construction Bureau (DSSCU), Municipal Affairs Bureau (IAM), and the Transport Bureau (DSAT).

== Signage ==
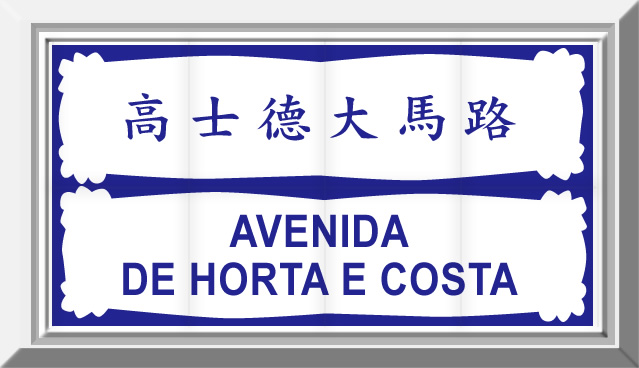
Typical street sign in Macau

Road signs in Macau are in Portuguese and traditional Chinese. They consist of white tiles attached on concrete posts or on walls of buildings. Signage on bridges is white with black lettering (Portuguese and Chinese).

== Naming ==
In some cases road names are the same in meaning for both Portuguese name and Chinese name. However, there are some cases where Portuguese and Chinese meaning differ, such as Praceta de 24 Junho (Plaza of June 24) which is shown as 城市日前地, which translates as City Day Plaza instead.

== Road types ==
- Estrada/Caminho – Road
- Avenida/Caminho – Avenue
- Alameda – Boulevard/Promenade
- Rua/Ramal – Street
- Istmo – Isthmus
- Rampa/Calçada – Ramp
- Pista (Only in private roads at University of Macau) – Lane
- Pátio – Yard
- Beco – Alley/Crescent
- Travessa – Alley/Lane
- Azinhaga – Shortcut
- Escada/Escadaria – Stairs/Steps
- Adro/Largo/Praceta/Praça – Plaza/Square
- Rotunda – Roundabout
- Miradouro – Viewing Point

Macau has 50 km of paved roads (estradas) in areas that permit wide roadways. Most of the roads in Macau and parts of Taipa are narrow side streets. Highways in Macau are semi controlled access roadways and the maximum speed is 80 km/h.

== List of roads on Macau Peninsula ==
=== Street (Rua) ===
- Ramal dos Mouros – named for Castle of the Moors in Sintra, Portugal
- Rua 25 de Abril – named for the Carnation Revolution of 1974
- Rua do Almirante Sérgio
- Rua de Berlim
- Rua de Bruxelas
- Rua do Campo
- Rua do Canal Novo
- Rua do Caracol
- Rua Central
- Rua Cidade de Braga – named for Braga
- Rua Cidade de Coimbra – named for Coimbra
- Rua Cidade do Porto – named for Porto
- Rua Cidade de Santarém – named for Santarém, Portugal
- Rua Cidade de Sintra – named for Sintra
- Rua da Concórdia
- Rua do Dr. Lourenço Marques
- Rua das Estalagens
- Rua da Fábrica
- Rua da Felicidade
- Rua de Fernão Mendes Pinto
- Rua da Grunta
- Rua dos Hortelãos
- Rua do Lago Sai Van
- Rua de Londres – named for London
- Rua da Madeira – named for Madeira
- Rua da Malaca – named for Malacca
- Rua do Miradouro de Santa Sancha
- Rua Norte do Patane
- Rua Oeste de Entre Lagos
- Rua da Papaia
- Rua de Paris – named for Paris, France
- Rua de Pequim – named for Beijing, China
- Rua da Piedade
- Rua de Roma – named for Rome, Italy
- Rua do Patane
- Rua de Sanches de Miranda
- Rua São Tiago da Barra
- Rua Sul do Patane
- Rua Va Tai
- Rua de Madrid – named for Madrid, Spain

=== Roundabout and square (Rotunda, Largo, Praceta and Praça) ===
- Adro de São Lázaro
- Largo de Santo Agostinho
- Largo do São Domingos
- Largo do Senado
- Largo do Terminal Marítimo - named for the ferry terminal
- Praça da Assembleia Legislativa
- Praça Ferreira do Amaral
- Praça de Jorge Álvares
- Praça do Lago Sai Van
- Praça de Luís de Camões
- Praça de Ponte e Horta
- Praça das Portas do Cerco
- Praceta de 1 de Outubro
- Praceta 24 de Junho – named for the date in which Portugal won the Battle of Macau
- Praceta 25 de Abril – named for the Carnation Revolution
- Praceta do Bom Sucesso
- Praceta Central Froneiriça de Hong Kong-Zhuhai-Macau
- Praceta de Miramar
- Praceta do Museu de Macau
- Praceta do Parque Industrial
- Praceta da Serenidade
- Praceta de Venceslau de Morais
- Rotunda do Almirante Costa Cabral
- Rotunda de Carlos da Maia
- Rotunda de Hou Kong
- Rotunda de São João Bosco

=== Alley, crescent and lane (Beco, Pátio and Travessa) ===
- Travessa da Praia
- Travessa da Paixao

=== Avenue and road (Avenida and Estrada) ===
==== Avenida (Avenue) ====
- Avenida 1° de Maio – named for May Day
- Avenida 24 de Junho – named for the date in which Portugal won the Battle of Macau
- Avenida Almeida Ribeiro
- Avenida do Almirante Lacerda
- Avenida da Amizade
- Avenida do Comendador Ho Yin
- Avenida Comercial de Macau
- Avenida do Conselheiro Borja – Governor of Macau Custódio Miguel de Borja
- Avenida do Conselheiro Ferreira de Almeida
- Avenida do Coronel Mesquita
- Avenida D. João IV – named for King of Portugal John IV of Portugal
- Avenida Doutor Ma Man Kei
- Avenida Doutor Mário Soares – named for former Prime Minister and President of Portugal Mário Soares
- Avenida do Doutor Rodrigo Rodrigues
- Avenida Doutor Stanley Ho – named for Macau billionaire and casino owner Dr Stanley Ho
- Avenida Dr. Sun Yat-sen – named for Chinese revolutionary leader Sun Yat-sen
- Avenida do Governador Jaime Silvério Marques – named for Governor of Macau Jamie Silvério Marques
- Avenida de Horta e Costa – named after José Maria de Sousa Horta e Costa
- Avenida do Hipódromo
- Avenida Infante D. Henrique – named for Portuguese explorer Henry the Navigator
- Avenida Marginal do Lam Mau
- Avenida Marginal do Patane
- Avenida Norte do Hipódromo
- Avenida Leste do Hipódromo
- Avenida Longevidade
- Avenida do Ouvidor Arriaga
- Avenida Panorâmica do Lago Nam Van
- Avenida Panorâmica do Lago Sai Van
- Avenida da Ponte da Amizade
- Avenida da Praia Grande
- Avenida da República
- Avenida de Sagres
- Avenida de Sidónio Pais
- Avenida Sir Andres Ljungstedt – named for Swedish merchant Anders Ljungstedt who refuted the Portuguese claim over Macau
- Avenida de Tun Seng
- Avenida de Venceslau de Morais – named for Portuguese writer Wenceslau de Moraes

==== Estrada (Road) ====
- Estrada Dona Maria II – named for Maria II of Portugal, Queen regnant
- Estrada da Areia Preta – Areia Preta translates as Black sand
- Estrada do Campo
- Estrada do Engenheiro Trigo
- Estrada Marginal da Areia Preta – Marginal da Areia Preta translates as Seafront Black sand
- Estrada Nova
- Estrada da Penha – Penha translates as cliff or rocky hill
- Estrada de S. Francisco
- Estrada do Visconde de S. Januário
- Estrada da Vitória

=== Boulevard or promenade (Alameda) ===
- Alameda Dr Carlos d'Assumpção – named for late Chairman of the Macau Legislative Assembly and a member of the Fundação Oriente's Consultative Committee
- Alameda da Tranquilidade

=== Ramp (Calçada and Rampa) ===
- Calçada do Amparo
- Calçada da Barra
- Calçada do Bom Jesus
- Calçada do Bom Parto
- Calçada do botelho
- Calçada Central de S. Lázaro
- Calçada das Chácaras
- Calçada do Embaixador
- Calçada de Eugénio Gonçalves
- Calçada da Feitoria
- Calçada de Francisco António
- Calçada do Gaio
- Calçada do Galo
- Calçada da Igreja de S. Lázaro
- Calçada do Januário
- Calçada do Lilau
- Calçada do Monte
- Calçada da Paz
- Calçada da Penha
- Calçada do Poço
- Calçada da Praia
- Calçada dos Quartéis
- Calçada dos Remédios
- Calçada da Rocha
- Calçada de Santo Agostinho
- Calçada de S. Francisco Xavier
- Calçada de S. João
- Calçada de S. Paulo
- Calçada das Sortes
- Calçada da Surpresa
- Calçada do Teatro – named for Dom Pedro V Theatre
- Calçada do Tronco Velho
- Calçada das Verdades
- Calçada do Visconde de S. Januário
- Calçada da Vitória
- Rampa da Barra
- Rampa dos Cavaleiros
- Rampa de D. Maria II
- Rampa do Forte de Mong Há
- Rampa da Guia
- Rampa do Padre Vasconcelos
- Rampa da Penha
- Rampa do Reservatório

=== Stairs or steps (Escada) ===
- Escada da Árvore
- Escada do Caracol
- Escada do Muro
- Escada do Papel
- Escada Quebra-Costas

=== Viewing point (Miradouro) ===
- Miradouro da Penha
- Miradouro de D. Maria II
- Miradouro de Henry Dunant – named for Red Cross co-founder Henry Dunant. There is a bust of him at the viewing point.
- Miradouro de Nossa Senhora da Guia
- Miradouro de Nossa Senhora da Penha
- Miradouro de Nossa Senhora da Saúde
- Miradouro de Nossa Senhora do Mar
- Miradouro de Santa Sancha

== List of roads on Taipa and Cotai ==
=== Street (Rua) ===
- Rua dos Açores – named for Azores
- Rua de Aveiro – named for Aveiro, Portugal
- Rua da Baía
- Rua da Baía de Nossa Senhora da Esperança – Our Lady of Hope Bay Street
- Rua dos Bem Casados
- Rua de Braga – named for Braga
- Rua de Bragança – named for Bragança, Portugal
- Rua do Cais de Pac On
- Rua de Chaves – named for Chaves, Portugal
- Rua de Chiu Chau – named for Chaozhou
- Rua de Choi Long
- Rua de Chong Heng – named for Chongqing
- Rua Cidade de Lisboa – named for Lisbon
- Rua dos Clérigos
- Rua de Coimbra – named for Coimbra
- Rua do Colégio
- Rua Correia da Silva
- Rua do Cunha – named for Portuguese explorer Tristão da Cunha
- Rua do Delgado
- Rua do Desporto – Sport Street
- Rua Direita Carlos Eugénio
- Rua de Évora – named for Évora
- Rua de Fat San – named for Foshan
- Rua da Felicidade
- Rua Fernão Mendes Pinto – named for Fernão Mendes Pinto
- Rua das Gaivotas
- Rua Governador Tamagnini Barbosa
- Rua da Harmonia
- Rua Heng Long
- Rua Ho Lin Vong
- Rua de Hong Chau – named for Hangzhou
- Rua de Horta e Sousa
- Rua do Jardim
- Rua Um dos Jardins do Oceano
- Rua Dois dos Jardins do Oceano
- Rua Três dos Jardins do Oceano
- Rua Quatro dos Jardins do Oceano
- Rua Cinco dos Jardins do Oceano
- Rua Seis dos Jardins do Oceano
- Rua dos Jogos da Ásia Oriental – East Asian Games Street
- Rua de Kwai Lam – named for Guilin
- Rua de Lagos – named for Lagos
- Rua da Madeira – named for Madeira
- Rua do Meio
- Rua dos Mercadores
- Rua do Minho
- Rua de Montenegro – named for Montenegro
- Rua de Nam Keng – named for Nanjing
- Rua dos Negociantes
- Rua do Pai Kok
- Rua da Patinagem – Ice-skating Street
- Rua de Pequim – named for Beijing
- Rua da Ponta Negra – Black Bridge Street
- Rua do Porto – named for Porto
- Rua do Progresso
- Rua da Prosperidade
- Rua do Regedor
- Rua da Restauração
- Rua do Retiro
- Rua da Riqueza
- Rua de Sai On – named for Xi'an
- Rua de San Tau – named for Shantou
- Rua de Seng Tou – named for Chengdu
- Rua de Siu Heng – named for Zhaoqing
- Rua de Siu Kuan – named for Shaoguan
- Rua de S. João
- Rua do Sol
- Rua Son Keng
- Rua do Súpico
- Rua de Tai Lin – named for Dalian
- Rua de Tai Pou
- Rua de Ténis
- Rua de Tin Chon – named for Tianjin
- Rua do Tiro – Archery Street
- Rua da Tranquilidade
- Rua das Virtudes
- Rua de Viseu – named for Viseu
- Rua da Vitória
- Rua Wo Mok
- Rua de Zhanjiang – named for Zhanjiang

=== Avenue and road (Avenida, Caminho and Estrada) ===
- Avenida do Aeroporto
- Avenida da Benevolência (Ilhas Hospital Complex)
- Avenida de Cotai
- Avenida de Carlos da Maia
- Avenida da Cidade Nova – New City Avenue
- Avenida Doutor Henry Fok
- Avenida Dr. Sun Yat Sen – named for Chinese revolutionary leader Sun Yat-sen.
- Avenida da Fraternidade (Ilhas Hospital Complex)
- Avenida de Guimarães – named for Guimarães
- Avenida de Kwong Tung
- Avenida do Estádio
- Avendia do Hospital das Ilhas (Ilhas Hospital Complex)
- Avenida dos Jardins do Oceano
- Avenida dos Jogos da Ásia Oriental
- Avenida Marginal Flor de Lótus
- Avenida da Nave Desportiva
- Avenida Olímpica
- Avenida Padre Tomás Pereira
- Avenida da Praia
- Avenida do Progresso
- Avenida da Prosperidade
- Avenida Son On
- Avenida Wai Long
- Caminho das Hortas
- Caminho da Povoação de Cheok Ka
- Estrada Almirante Marques Esparteiro
- Estrada Almirante Magalhães Correia – named for former governor Luís Magalhães Correia.
- Estrada da Baía de Nossa Senhora da Esperança – Our Lady of Hope Bay Road
- Estrada do Cais de Pac On
- Estrada Coronel Nicolau de Mesquita
- Estrada do Dique Oeste
- Estrada Flor de Lótus – the lotus is the floral emblem of Macau
- Estrada Governador Albano de Oliveira
- Estrada Governador Nobre de Carvalho – named for Governor of Macau José Manuel de Sousa e Faria Nobre de Carvalho 1966 to 1974
- Estrada do Istmo
- Estrada Lou Lim Ieok – named for Chinese born Macau merchant Lou Lim Ieok
- Estrada Nordeste da Taipa
- Estrada de Pac On
- Estrada Padre Estevão Eusébio Situ
- Estrada da Ponta da Cabrita
- Estrada da Ponte de Pac On
- Estrada dos Sete Tanques

=== Roundabout and square (Rotunda, Largo and Praça) ===
- Largo da Baía
- Largo dos Bombeiros
- Largo Camões
- Largo do Carmo
- Largo Governador Tamagnini Barbosa
- Largo Maia de Magalhães
- Largo de Pac On
- Largo da Ponte
- Largo Sanches Miranda
- Rotunda da Aeronáutica
- Rotunda do Aeroporto
- Rotunda da Central Térmica de Coloane – Coloane Power Plant Roundabout
- Rotunda de Cotai
- Rotunda do Dique Oeste
- Rotunda Dr. Carlos A. Correa Pães d'Assumpção – named for late Chairman of the Macau Legislative Assembly and a member of the Fundação Oriente's Consultative Committee
- Rotunda Dr. Sun Yat Sen
- Rotunda do Estádio – Stadium Roundabout
- Rotunda Flor de Lótus – Lotus Flower Roundabout
- Rotunda do Istmo
- Rotunda dos Jogos da Ásia Oriental
- Rotunda de Leonel de Sousa
- Rotunda Marginal
- Rotunda Ouvidor Arriaga
- Rotunda de Pac On
- Rotunda Padre Tomás Pereira
- Rotunda da Piscina Olímpica – Olympic Swimming Pool Roundabout
- Rotunda Tenente P.J. da Silva Loureiro
- Rotunda da Universidade de Ciência e Tecnologia

=== Lane, crescent and alley (Beco and Travessa) ===
- Beco da Alegria
- Beco da Baía
- Beco do Desporto
- Beco do Ferreiro
- Beco das Flores
- Beco da Formiga
- Beco do Penacho
- Beco da Pérola
- Beco da Sorte
- Travessa da Boa Vista
- Travessa das Bruxas
- Travessa das Canastras
- Travessa do Carmo
- Travessa da Esperança
- Travessa da Felicidade
- Travessa da Glória
- Travessa Lou Fu
- Travessa dos Mercadores
- Travessa Nova
- Travessa da Povoação de Sam Ka
- Travessa da Rebeca
- Travessa de Santa Gertrudes

=== Ramp (Calçada and Rampa) ===
- Calçada do Carmo
- Calçada do Quartel
- Rampa do Observatório
- Rampa da Taipa Grande

=== Stairs and steps (Escada and Escadaria) ===
- Escada do Coxo
- Escadaria de Iat Fai

== List of roads in the University of Macau (Taipa) ==
=== Street (Rua) ===
- Rua do Ameixas dos Pêssegos e Peras (private road)
- Rua da Biblioteca Norte (private road)
- Rua da Biblioteca Sul (private road)
- Rua do Elite (private road)
- Rua do Estudioso (private road)
- Rua da Interdisciplinaridade (private road)
- Rua Leste de Investigação Científica
- Rua Norte de Investigação Científica (private road)
- Rua Oeste de Investigação Científica
- Rua da Medicina Compassiva (private road)
- Rua do Pinheiro (private road)
- Rua dos Saberes
- Rua da Sumaúma (private road)

=== Avenue (Avenida) ===
- Avenida de Antigos Alunos (private road)
- Avenida Central (private road)
- Avenida do Crisântemo (private road)
- Avenida Lótus (private road)
- Avenida da Perfeição (private road)
- Avenida da Residência (private road)
- Avenida da Saúde
- Avenida do Transporte – where the university's bus terminus is located.
- Avenida da Universidade
- Avenida das Virtudes
- Avenida da Vitória

=== Lane (Pista) ===
- 1ª Pista do Colégio (private road)
- 2ª Pista do Colégio (private road)
- 3ª Pista do Colégio (private road)
- 4ª Pista do Colégio (private road)
- 5ª Pista do Colégio (private road)
- 6ª Pista do Colégio (private road)
- 1ª Pista do Faculdade (private road)
- 2ª Pista do Faculdade (private road)
- 3ª Pista do Faculdade (private road)
- 4ª Pista do Faculdade (private road)
- 5ª Pista do Faculdade (private road)
- 6ª Pista do Faculdade (private road)

=== Roundabouts (Rotunda) ===
- Rotunda da Sumaúma (private road)
- Rotunda Norte da Universidade
- Rotunda Sul da Universidade

== List of roads on Coloane ==
=== Boulevard or Promenade (Alameda) ===
- Alameda da Harmonia

=== Street (Rua) ===
- Rua das Acácias Rubras
- Rua das Albizias
- Rua de António Francisco
- Rua das Árvores do Pagode
- Rua dos Bombaxes
- Rua do Caetano
- Rua das Canforeiras
- Rua de Central Térmica de Coloane
- Rua de Cipreste
- Rua da Cordoaria
- Rua Correia Lemos
- Rua do Estaleiro
- Rua dos Eucaliptos
- Rua da Flor de Merenda
- Rua das Gaivotas
- Rua do Interior
- Rua Um de Ip Heng
- Rua Dois de Ip Heng
- Rua Três de Ip Heng
- Rua dos Jamboleiros
- Rua do Jardim
- Rua Um dos Jardins de Cheoc Van
- Rua Dois dos Jardins de Cheoc Van
- Rua Três dos Jardins de Cheoc Van
- Rua Um de Koi Nga
- Rua Dois de Koi Nga
- Rua das Mangueiras
- Rua Marginal da Concórdia
- Rua das Margoseiras
- Rua do Meio
- Rua dos Navegantes
- Rua dos Negociantes
- Rua de San Lei
- Rua das Schimas
- Rua de S. Francisco Xavier
- Rua do Tassara

=== Avenue and road (Avenida, Caminho and Estrada) ===
- Avenida de Cinco de Outubro
- Avenida da Harmonia
- Avenida de Ip Heng
- Avenida de Lok Koi
- Avenida de Luís de Camões
- Avenida Marginal Flor de Lótus
- Avenida da República
- Avenida de Vale das Borboletas
- Caminho das Águas
- Caminho da Cordoaria
- Caminho da Povoação de Ká-Hó
- Caminho de Tan Fong
- Caminho de Telesat
- Caminho do Quartel de Hac Sá
- Estrada da Aldeia
- Estrada do Altinho de Ká Hó – named for village of Ká-Hó
- Estrada do Alto de Coloane
- Estrada da Barragem de Ká Hó
- Estrada do Campo
- Estrada de Cheoc Van
- Estrada de Hac Sá – named for local Hac Sa Beach
- Estrada de Hac Sá Long Chao Kok
- Estrada do Istmo
- Estrada de Lai Chi Vun
- Estrada Militar
- Estrada de Nossa Senhora de Ká Hó
- Estrada Nova de Hac Sá
- Estrada de Seac Pai Van – Street and nearby park on Coloane named after Seac Pai Van

=== Alley, crescent, yard and lane (Azinhaga, Beco, Pátio and Travessa) ===
- Azinhaga dos Amores
- Azinhaga dos Piratas
- Beco do Campo
- Beco do Funil
- Beco do Jardim
- Beco de Lótus
- Beco do Poço
- Beco da Rosa
- Pátio das Flores
- Pátio do Gaio
- Pátio do Gordo
- Pátio da Greta
- Pátio do Sol
- Pátio do Velho
- Travessa do Balichão
- Travessa da Cordoaria
- Travessa do Estaleiro
- Travessa da Formiga
- Travessa da Igreja
- Travessa Um de Long Chao Kok
- Travessa Dois de Long Chao Kok
- Travessa Três de Long Chao Kok
- Travessa da Pipa
- Travessa da República
- Travessa da Taipa
- Travessa das Trinas

=== Ramp (Calçada and Rampa) ===
- Calçada do Quartel

=== Roundabout and square (Rotunda, Largo and Praça) ===
- Largo do Bazar
- Largo do Caetano
- Largo do Cais
- Largo da Cordoaria
- Largo do Estaleiro
- Largo da Fonte
- Largo do Matadouro
- Largo do Presidente António Ramalho Eanes
- Largo Tam Kong Miu
- Largo Tin Hau Miu
- Praceta de Seac Pai Van
- Rotunda do Altinho de Ká Hó – named for village of Ká-Hó
- Rotunda da Concórdia
- Rotunda da Harmonia
- Rotunda das Palmeiras

=== Stairs (Escadaria) ===
- Escadaria da Praia de Cheoc Van

== See also ==
- Transport in Macau
