= Yaohan =

Japanese retail group

Yaohan Co., LTD.
- Native name: 株式会社ヤオハン
- Romanized name: Kabushiki gaisha Yaohan
- Industry: Retail
- Founded: 1930; 96 years ago in Japan; 1948; 78 years ago (incorporated)
- Founder: Ryohei and Katsu Wada
- Defunct: 1997; 29 years ago
- Fate: Bankrupt; Most assets acquired by ÆON; Japanese stores became MaxValu; some overseas stores became JUSCO (now ÆON)
- Successor: MaxValu (in Japan)
- Area served: Worldwide
- Key people: Kazuo Wada

Yaohan Co., Ltd. (Japanese: 株式会社ヤオハン, Hepburn: Kabushiki gaisha Yaohan) or Yaohan (ヤオハン; or 八百半); (Chinese: 八佰伴) was a Japanese retail group, founded in 1930 by Ryohei Wada (和田 良平, Wada Ryōhei) and his wife Katsu Wada (和田 カツ, Wada Katsu). Initially a single shop selling vegetables, it was expanded by their son Kazuo Wada into a major supermarket chain with most retail outlets located in Shizuoka prefecture, south of Tokyo. It was incorporated in 1948 and listed on Tokyo Stock Exchange. The store was far more established and notable outside Japan, due to restrictive laws in Japan that made it difficult to set up new businesses, such that by the time it opened its first store in the Tokyo metropolitan area, the company was already in a state of decline due to accumulated debts from over-expansion.

== Growth ==
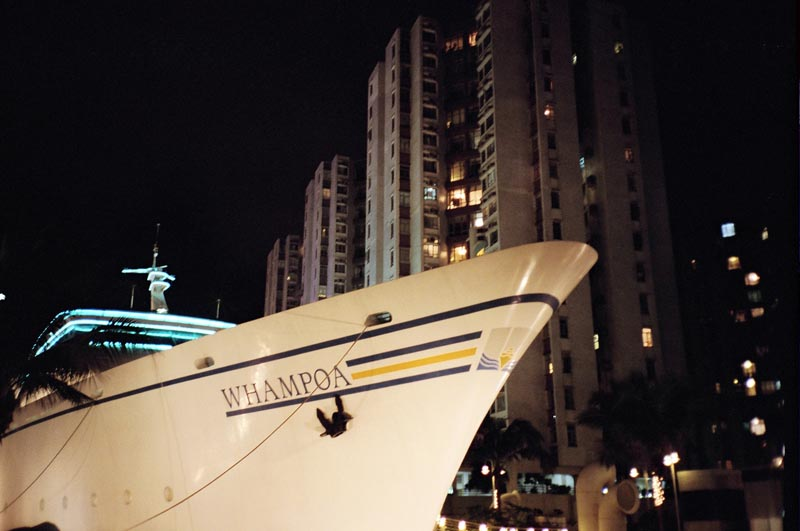
The Whampoa, a 110-meter-long shopping centre building that takes the form of a ship in Whampoa Garden, Hong Kong, housed a large Yaohan department store on its ground and basement levels from the 1980s to the late 1990s.

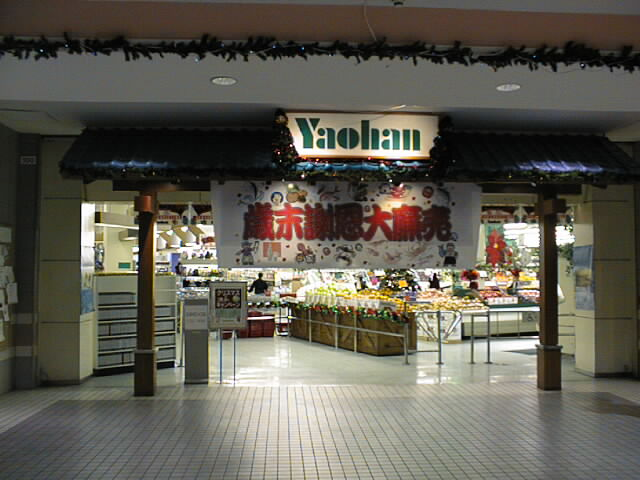
Yaohan store in Little Tokyo, Alameda Street, Los Angeles, USA

During the 1980s and 1990s, the Yaohan group expanded dramatically outside Japan, especially into Hong Kong (since 1984), Taiwan (since 1988), China (since 1995) and the US. At its peak, it had 450 outlets in 16 countries, including 9 in Hong Kong, as well in Brazil with stores in São Paulo (since 1971) and Sorocaba, San José, Costa Rica, Los Angeles, Vancouver (Yaohan Centre), Honolulu, London, and San Jose, California. Yaohan's first North American location, at Fresno, California, was opened in 1979 at Yaohan Plaza.

Its training center was located at Atami.

Typical of large Japanese companies, new employees were required to go through induction training programs that, in the case of Yaohan, had a strong religious emphasis on the principles of Seicho-no-Ie. Employees also had to go through regular seminars on Seicho-no-Ie and were ultimately required to be members of Seicho-no-Ie. This was not without resistance from its employees. Although the company was less strict on seminar attendance and membership for employees of overseas branches, the same resistance persisted.

=== Hong Kong ===
The first Yaohan store was opened in New Town Plaza, Sha Tin, Hong Kong in 1984. After that, Yaohan store grew quickly in Hong Kong and had opened nine stores, which include Tuen Mun Town Plaza, Whampoa Garden, Yuen Long, Ma On Shan, Tsuen Wan. All the stores were closed in 1997 due to the financial turmoil and the burst of the Japanese economy bubble. Then many stores were replaced by another Japanese department store chain, JUSCO (now called AEON).

Yaohan is one of the listed companies in Hong Kong during 1986 to 1997. It has owned many companies, such as the Wonderful World of Whimsy, Millie, Santa Ana Bakery and some another fast-food restaurant. But many of them were closed later.

=== Macau ===
Yaohan store was established and opened in 1992 in Macau. It is the first and the only department store in Macau until now. It was renamed as New Yaohan after the bankruptcy of the original company, and the new company is operated by Yaohan International Company Limited.

=== Malaysia ===
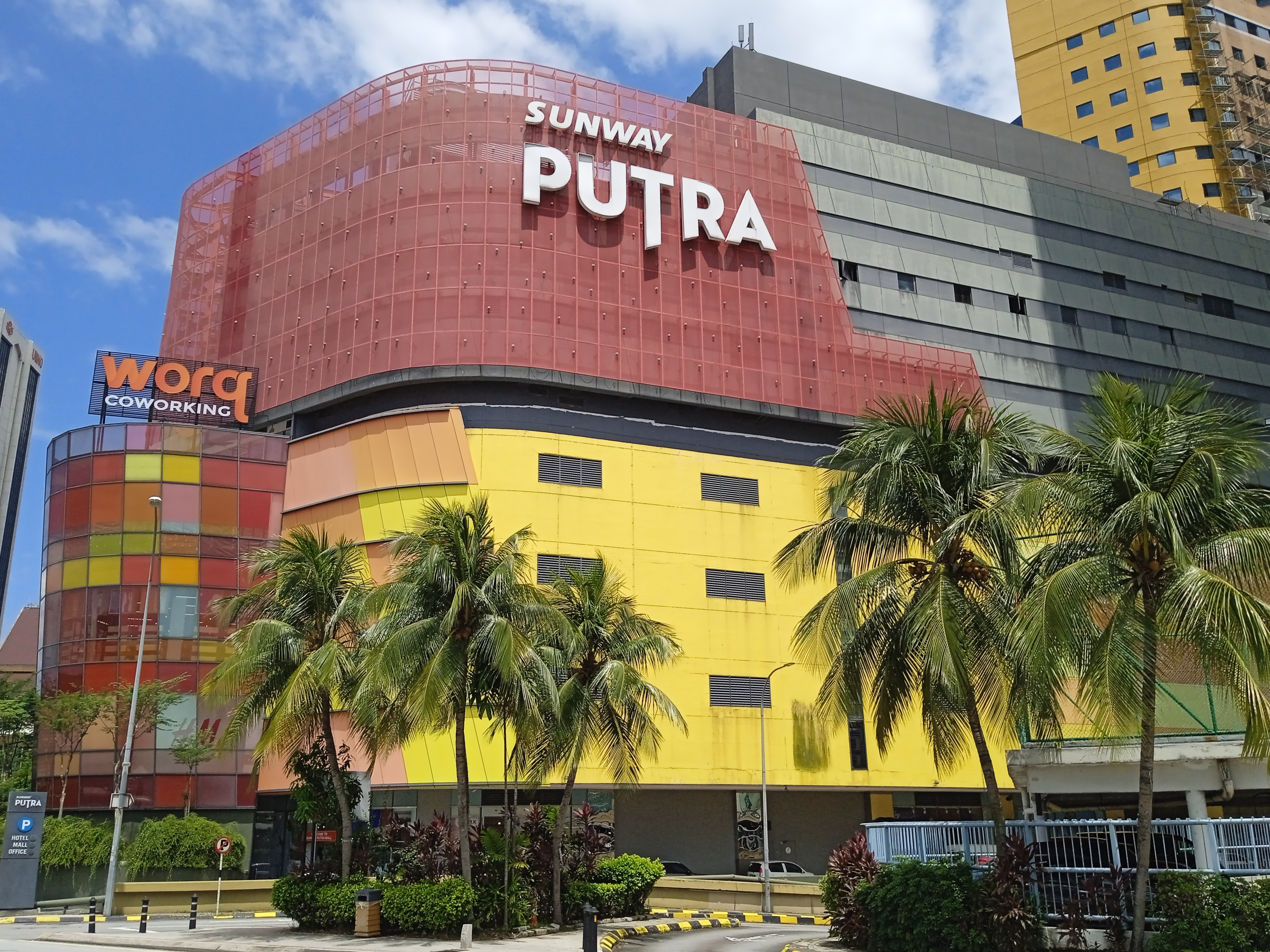
Sunway Putra Mall, where Yaohan's first Malaysian store once operated from 1987 to 1997. It is still referred to as Yaohan by the locals

The Malaysian branch of Yaohan – operated by Yaohan Malaysia Sdn Bhd – was owned by Metroplex Group Sdn Bhd, with the latter owning 36.5% of its shares while Yaohan Group Malaysia is owned by Yaohan of Japan with 22.87% of its shares owned by Metroplex Group.

Yaohan expended to Malaysia in May 1987 with its first store at The Mall in the Chow Kit district of Kuala Lumpur. Yaohan later opened an outlet in Johor Bahru (with Pelangi Berhad) and Penang.

In 1992, Yaohan Malaysia planned to open five more outlets within five years, including one in Sabah, totalling into nine outlets.

By 1997, Yaohan had expanded to seven stores including two in East Malaysia:

- (Federal Territories of Malaysia) The Mall, Chow Kit, Kuala Lumpur
- (Federal Territories of Malaysia) Plaza OUG (demolished in 2022), Old Klang Road, Kuala Lumpur
- KOMTAR, George Town, Penang
- Centre Point Sabah, Kota Kinabalu, Sabah
- Lahad Datu, Sabah
- Terminal One, Seremban, Negeri Sembilan
- Sunway Pyramid, Subang Jaya, Selangor

Following the chain's bankruptcy in 1997, all stores were replaced by Aktif Lifestyle Corporation Bhd in January 1998 and later Parkson in 2004.

=== Singapore ===
The Singapore branch of Yaohan was a joint venture of Yaohan Department Store Co, Ltd. and Development Bank of Singapore, Singapore Nomura Merchant Bank, Singmanex Pte Ltd and Tiger Pte Ltd. As of 1974, the branch had 550 staff; expanding to 1400 by 1979. The branch also owned the Yaohan trademark for Singapore, Malaysia and Brunei.

Yaohan had two bakeries: one in Woodlands and in Jurong, opened in April 1980. Its subsidiary, Shin Mei Trading, exports locally made products such as candy, ivory products and garments.

One of the oldest Japanese retailers in Singapore, its first store in 1974 at Plaza Singapura revolutionised the grocery shopping experience in Singapore, and it quickly became a household name. Other stores were also opened in Thomson Plaza (1979), Bukit Timah (1982), Jurong (1983), and Parkway Parade (1983). The Jurong store was closed in 1989, and a new store planned at the IMM Shopping Mall was due to open in 1990. The sixth store was supposed to open in Kovan Shopping Centre in 1993. When the last store to cease operations in 1997 exited Singapore from Thomson Plaza, its staff were visibly moved and some were in tears. Also in operation in Singapore since 1985 was the Yaohan Best chain (a joint venture with Best Denki), specializing in electronics, which first opened in Yaohan's store space.

In 1993, Yaohan Singapore was restructured with its retail business moved to Yaohan Department Store Singapore and real estate moving to Exceltech. Its retail business would be listed in 1996.

=== Brunei ===
Yaohan expanded to Brunei with its first store at Abdul Razak Plaza opened on March 13, 1987. Over 40,000 customers visited the store on its first day of operations. Yaohan Brunei was a joint venture of Yaohan Department Store of Japan and Haji Awang Abdul Hapidz, then-president of Malay Chamber of Commerce and Brunei National Chamber of Commerce and Industry.

=== Thailand ===
The first Yaohan store was opened in Thailand at Fortune Town, Ratchadaphisek Road, Bangkok in 1991 following by Future Park Bang Khae in 1994. (Thai: เยาฮัน) Withdrew during the year 1997 following financial crisis.

=== Indonesia ===
In 1992, Yaohan opened its first branch in Indonesia at Plaza Atrium, a shopping center in the Segitiga Senen superblock, Central Jakarta. Opening on 21 August 1992, the 3-storey store was 100% managed and owned by PT Suryaraya Mantaputama (co-owned by Suhartoyo, T.P. Rachmat, Djoko Soedjatmiko and Ali Santoso), being supported with a US$10 million investment from Yaohan International Company Limited, which also licensed branding, distribution, and basic training. After the Plaza Atrium branch, there were plans to open a second branch in Mal Kelapa Gading 2, although it was instead replaced with a Sogo. This outlet closed in early 1995, due to its inconspicuous location being unattractive for its target customers, resulting in rapid loss. It has since been replaced by Matahari, a local department store chain. A few unrelated supermarkets under the name Macan Yaohan also opened since 1985 in Medan, although all locations had since closed in 2015.

== Decline ==
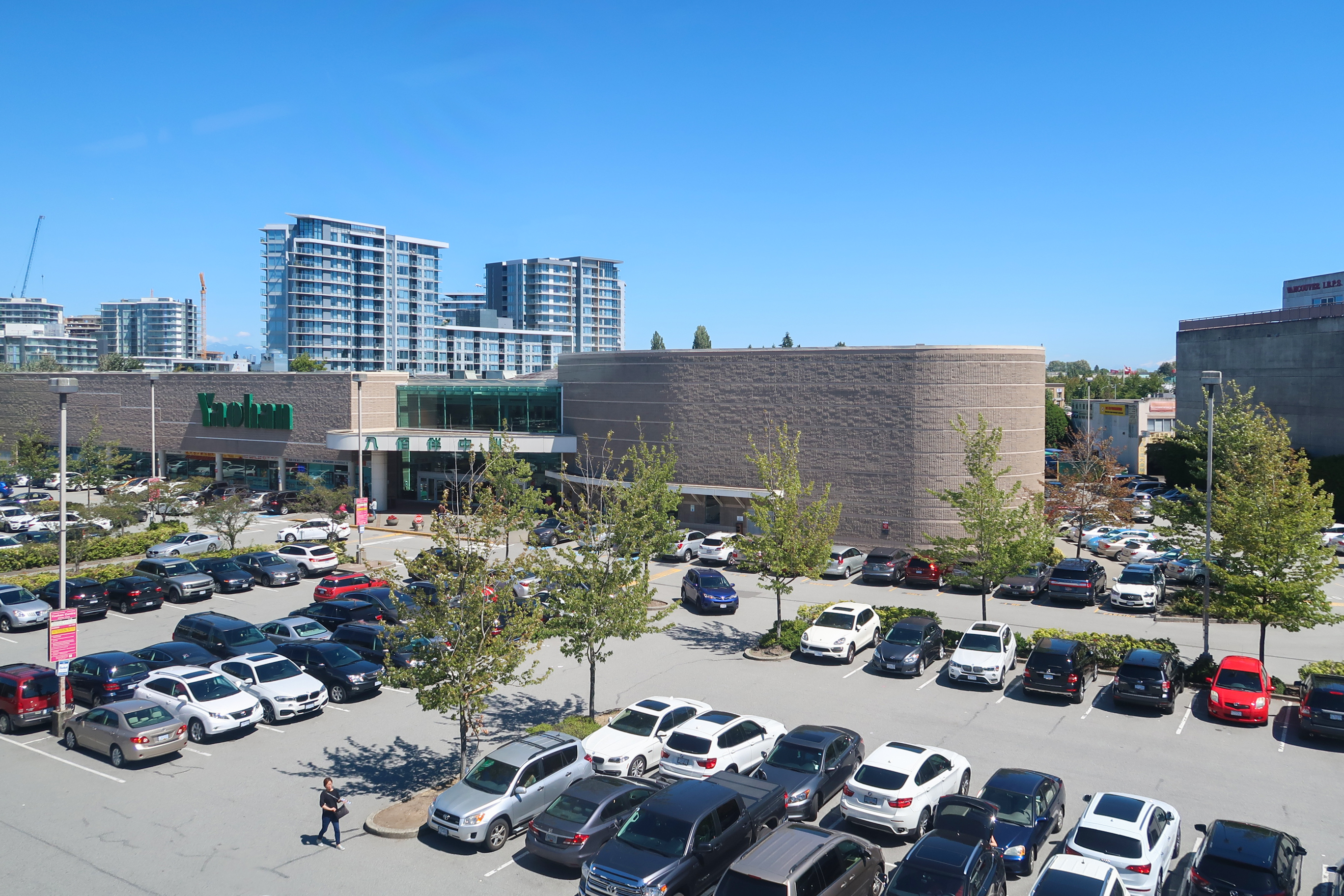
Yaohan Centre in Richmond, BC. The shopping centre retained its name after purchase by the President Group

When the company faced financial difficulties, it was split into two companies, one in Japan and with the overseas part headquartered in Hong Kong, in a bid to survive. The group was traded on the Hong Kong Stock Exchange as Yaohan International Company Limited until 11 August 1998. Through a combination of the 1997 Asian financial crisis and the stagnation of the Japanese retail market, however, the group declared bankruptcy with 161 billion yen of debts. It was the biggest postwar failure in Japan's retail sector at the time. Already at a "financial dead-end", the super-market chain asked for protection from creditors under Japan's Corporate Rehabilitation Law on 18 September 1997. Many outlets were closed.

In December 1997, Yaohan in Japan was bought by ÆON Group and changed its name to Maxvalu Tokai; most of the stores in Hong Kong were also overtaken by ÆON and became JUSCO. Other stores in the US were bought by Maruwa, Mitsuwa, and Marukai, the latter two based in Los Angeles. Stores in Canada were bought by The President Group, a Taiwanese company.

A former Yaohan department store in Macau is operating under the trading name New Yaohan (新八佰伴), operated by Yaohan International Company Limited in Hong Kong which is owned by STDM (controlled by Stanley Ho) and no longer has a connection with the Wada family. Yaohan Best has been renamed as Best Denki.

== See also ==
- Economy of Japan
- Oshin, an NHK asadora loosely based on the growth of Yaohan
- Oriental City, formerly Yaohan Plaza
