= Plaza Singapura =

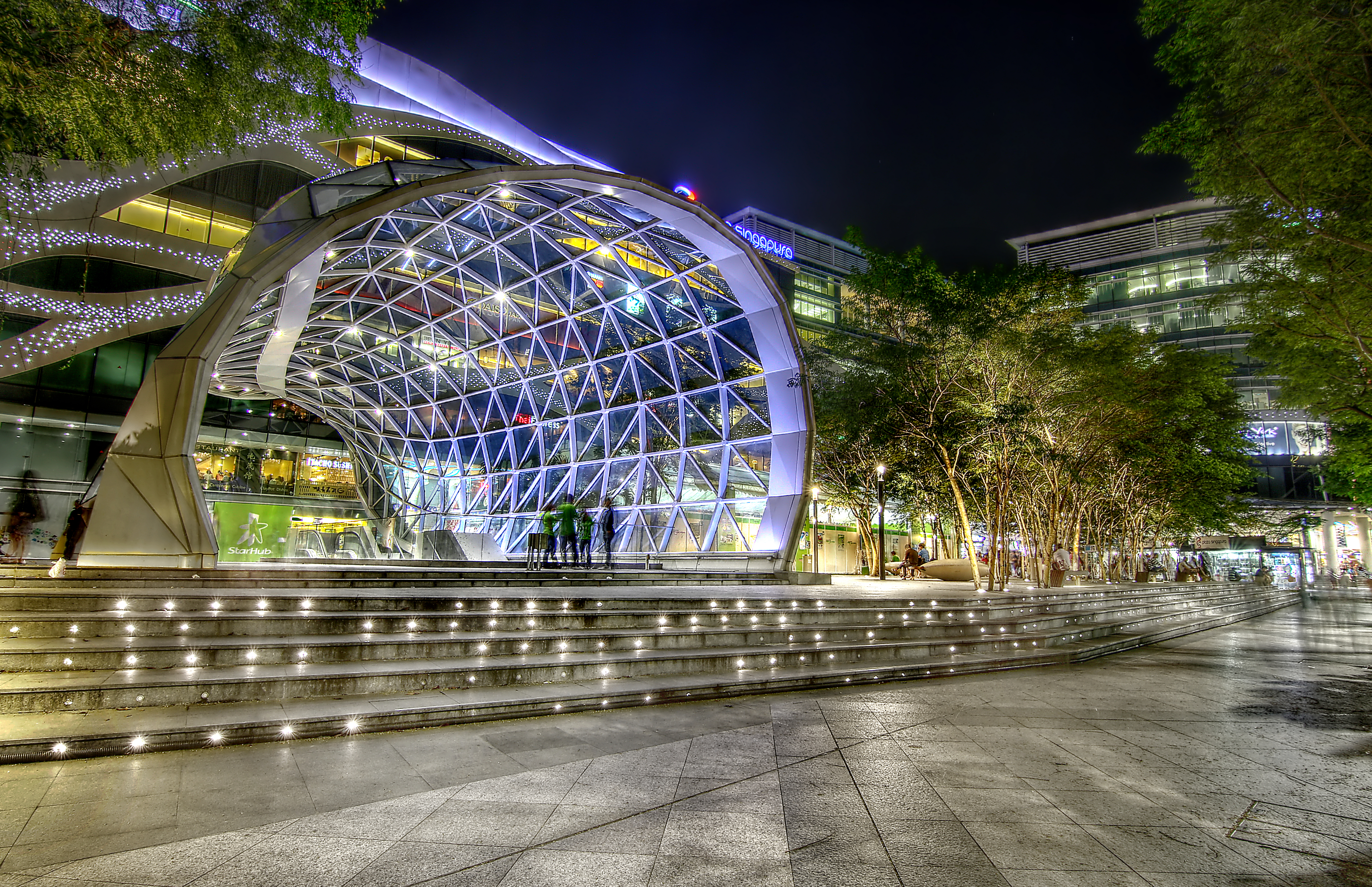
- Facade of Plaza Singapura in 2013
- Location: Singapore
- Coordinates: 01°18′03″N 103°50′42″E
- Address: 68 Orchard Road, Singapore 238839
- Opened: 14 September 1974; 52 years ago (original soft opening); 16 August 1975; 51 years ago (original official opening); 4 December 1998; 27 years ago (refurbished opening)
- Developer: DBS Land
- Manager: CapitaMalls Asia
- Owner: CapitaMall Trust
- Architect: BEP Akitek Pte Ltd
- Num. of stores: 320
- Num. of anchor tenants: 5
- Floor area: 629,000 sq ft (58,400 m^{2})
- Floors: 9
- Public transit: NS24 NE6 CC1 Dhoby Ghaut
- Website: www.plazasingapura.com.sg

Plaza Singapura is a contemporary shopping mall located along Orchard Road, Singapore, next to Dhoby Ghaut MRT station. The mall is managed by CapitaLand and owned by CapitaMall Trust. There are retail outlets over seven floors and two basements. The mall has a 752 lot seven-storey carpark at the rear of the building, and a two basement goods bay beneath it. The mall is popular with families, teenagers and young adults.

The mall was first opened in 1974 and in 2012, it underwent an extensive revamp which included the construction of a new wing increasing retail space by 25 percent. It is one of the oldest malls located along Orchard Road.

== History ==
Yaohan's supermarket at Basement 1 and department store at the ground floor opened in October 1974. Yaohan department store, located at Basement 2, opened on 1 November 1974 by then-chairman of Singapore Tourist Promotion Board Runme Shaw. At opening time, Yaohan's supermarket section had 16 checkout counters while its department store section had 19 sales counters.

Plaza Singapura was officially opened by then Minister for Finance, Hon Sui Sen in August 1975.

== Architecture ==
The mall once again underwent a revamp with a new tenant mix during the SARS period from 2002 to 2003. The mall had renovations in the basements, and a direct link to Dhoby Ghaut MRT station was constructed. Travelators were also installed in the building for the convenience of shoppers serving Basement 2, Basement 1 and Level 1.

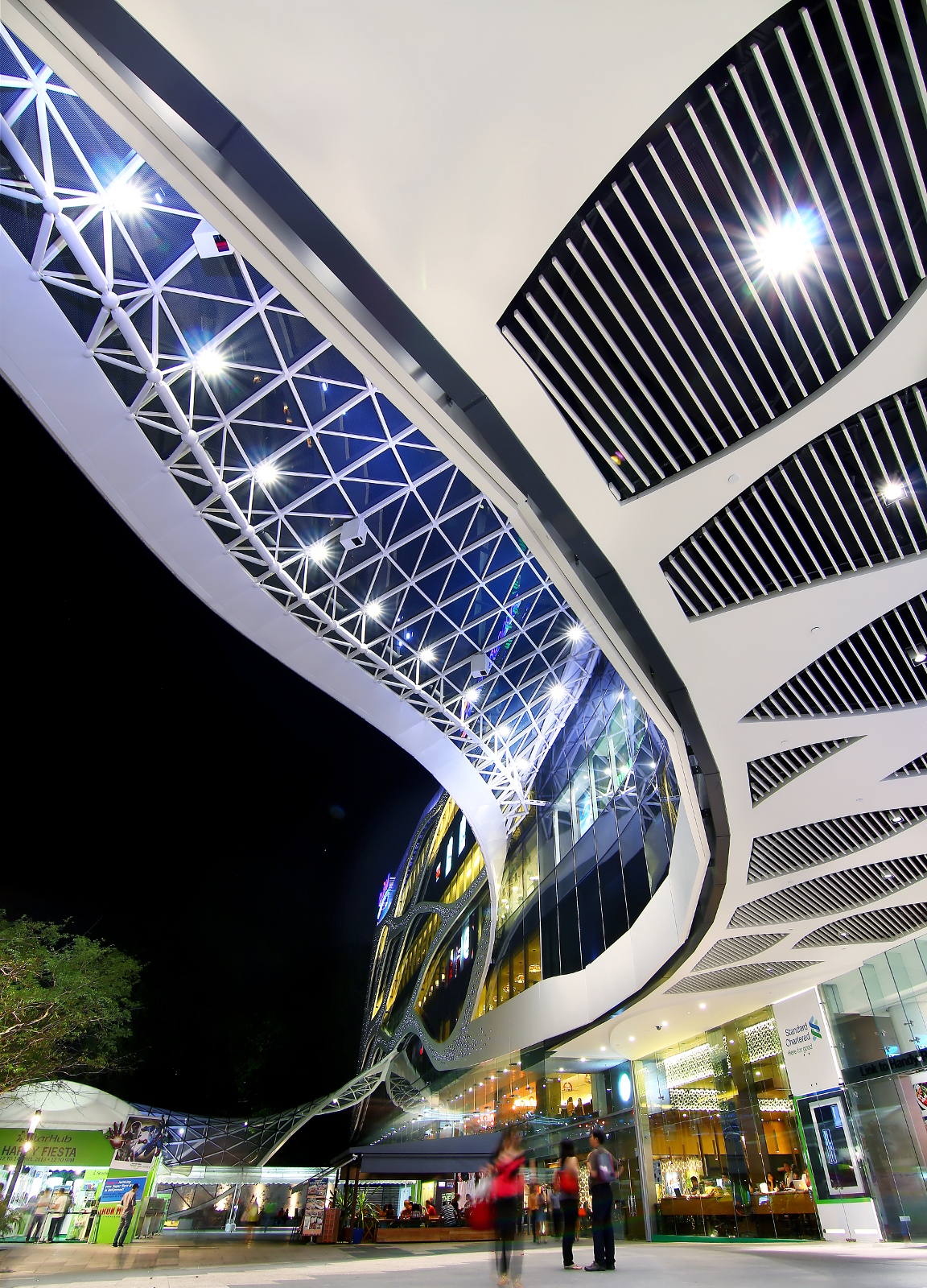
Plaza Singapura "Wave" façade after renovations.

In 2008, further changes were made to Plaza Singapura. Level 7 of the mall was given a facelift and tenants selling toys, gifts and hobby related items such as anime and cosplay costumes were introduced.

In 2012, Plaza Singapura underwent major renovation work which costs about S$150 million. The first phase involved the first three levels of Atrium@Orchard, which formerly housed several offices, now converted to shop spaces and linked to the main building. The second phase involves the former 81,000 sq ft (7,500 m^{2}) Carrefour (after the exit on 30 September that year) as was converted to supermarket Cold Storage at Basement 2 and department store John Little (ceased operations in December 2016) at Level 1, which were completed in June 2013. Previously, Urban Revivo had taken over the space from 2017 to 2023, and had then been replaced by Muji.

Times Bookstore had also closed down in February 2024 and was replaced by The Travel Store. Other long-time tenants include Daiso, Cotton On and Uniqlo.

The mall has also been given a new façade with a 170-metre long wave frontage and features multi-coloured sculptures called the Jelly Baby Family by Italian artist Mauro Peruchetti. The renovation and construction of a new wing has increased the retail floor area of the mall from 497,575 sq ft (46,226.2 m^{2}) to 629,000 sq ft (58,400 m^{2}), which added 80 new retail and F&B shops to the directory of the mall.

In 2015, Plaza Singapura underwent interior upgrading works. Floor finishes, corridor lighting, toilets and lift lobbies were upgraded. More nursing rooms were added on Level 2.

Plaza Singapura will undergo a major revamp in phases, from the third quarter of 2026 to the fourth quarter of 2028, to connect it more strongly with the surrounding green spaces. Though the mall remains open throughout, Golden Village cinema will shut down in August 2026 for good.

== Notable Restaurants ==
- Mamma Mia Trattoria E Caffè An Italian eatery offering a contemporary menu featuring pasta, and regional specialties with specialized dish as Tortiglioni Spicy Pink Sauce.
- Co Chung A Vietnamese restaurant
- Cajun on Wheels A Halal-certified seafood restaurant offering Cajun-style seafood buckets and platters.
- Arteastiq DePatio A European-style bistro serving a variety of dishes including pasta, grilled meats, and artisanal teas.
- Go-Ang Pratunam Chicken Rice A Thai eatery specializing in the famous Pratunam-style chicken rice.
- Akimitsu A Japanese restaurant offering tempura dons with a rich history spanning five generations.
- Tamoya Udon & Tempura A Japanese eatery known for its handmade udon noodles and crispy tempura.
- Muji Café A minimalist café offering a selection of Japanese-inspired dishes and desserts.
- Five Guys An American fast-food chain renowned for its customizable burgers and hand-cut fries.
- Nanjing Impressions A Chinese restaurant serving traditional Nanjing cuisine.

== Gallery ==
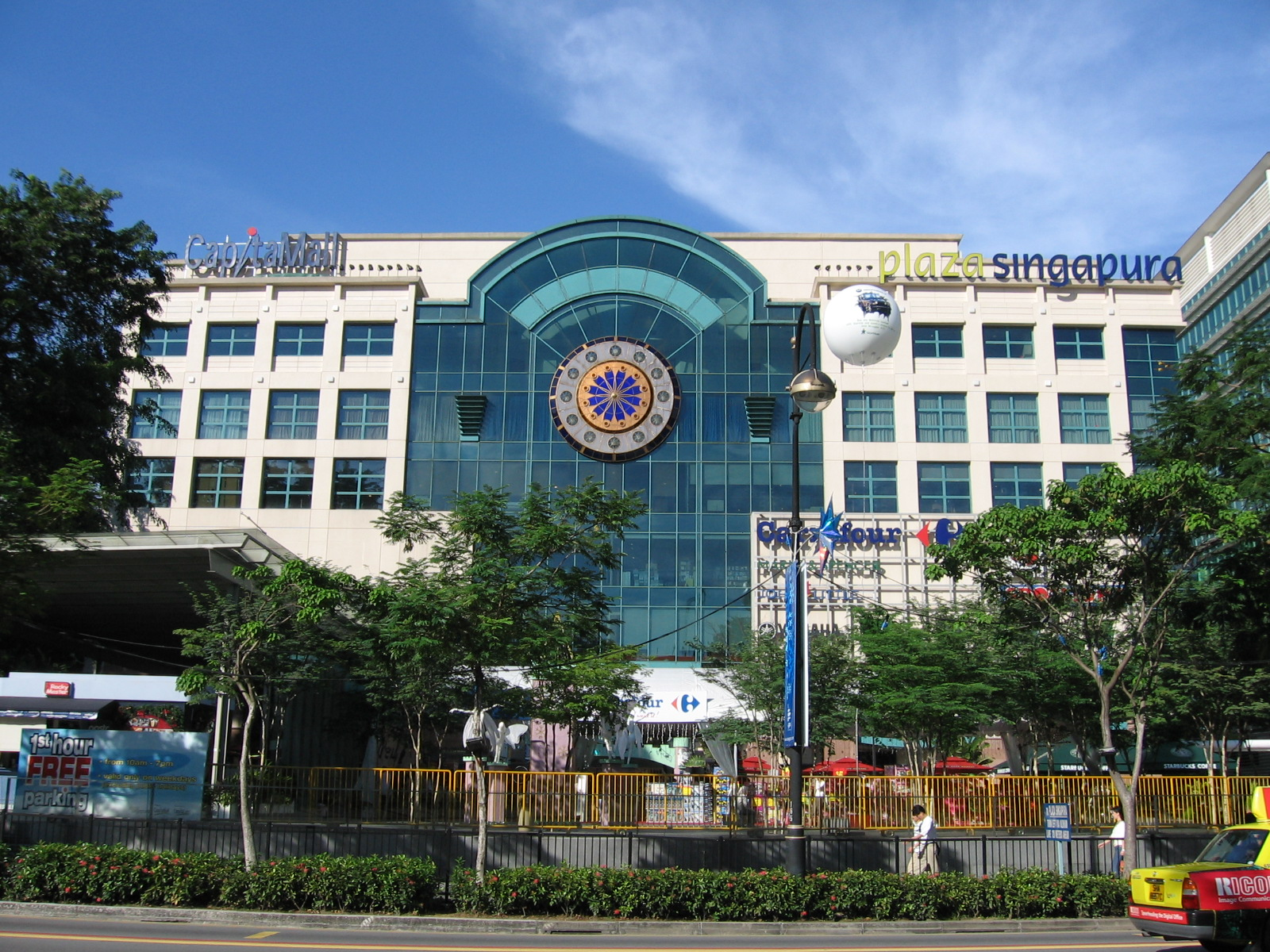
Old facade of Plaza Singapura in December 2005

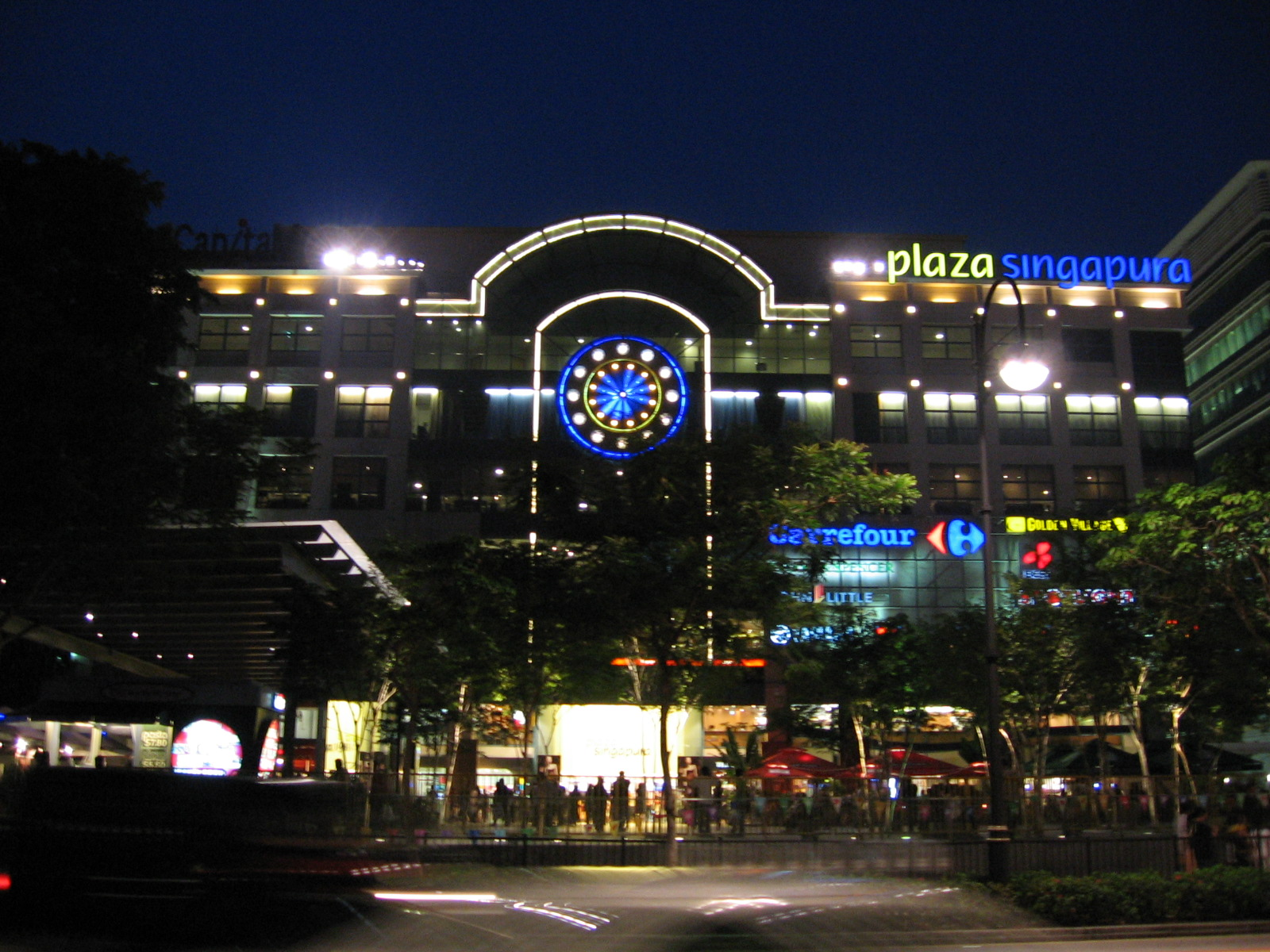
Plaza Singapura at night in August 2006

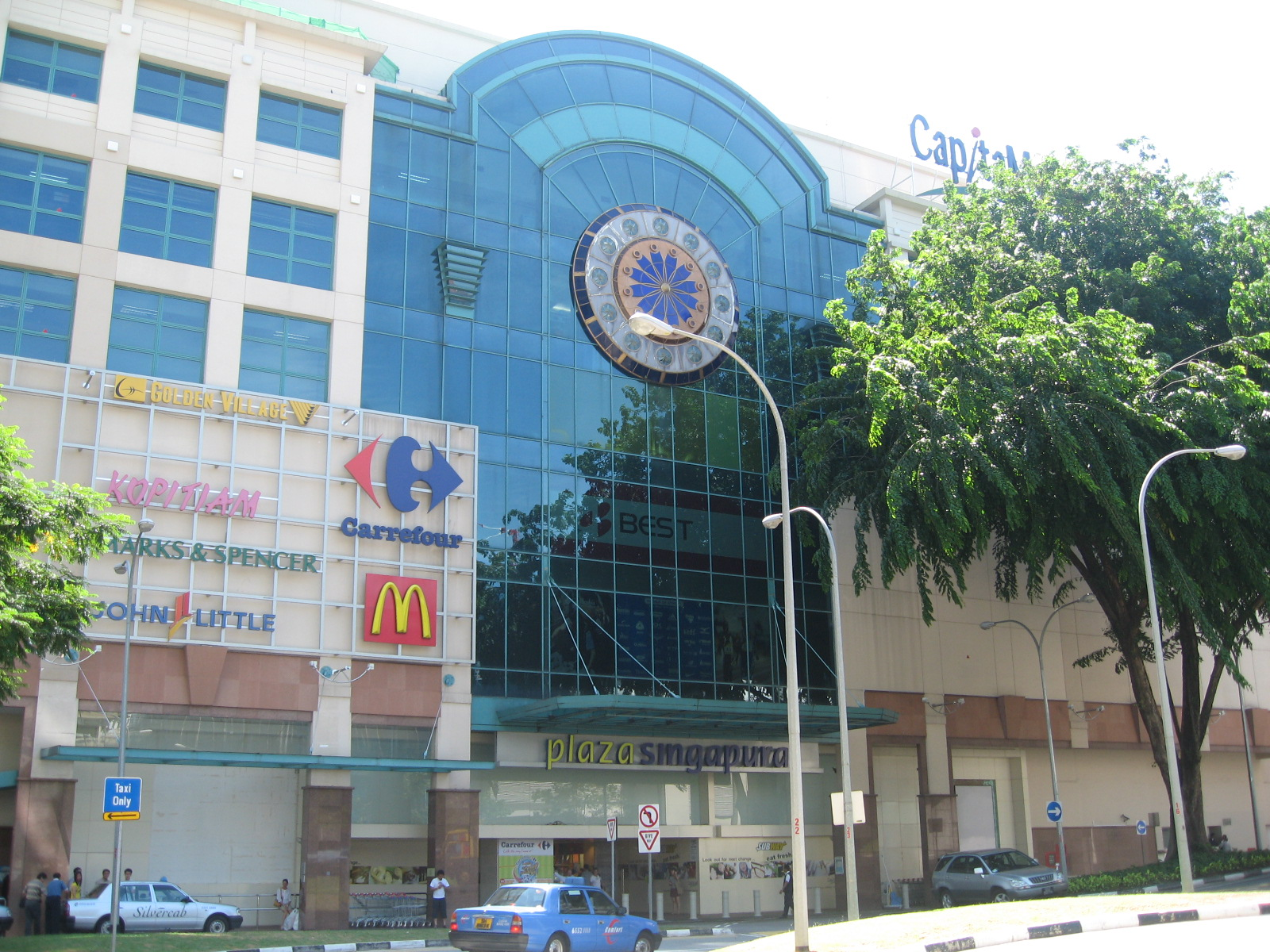
Plaza Singapura in 2006

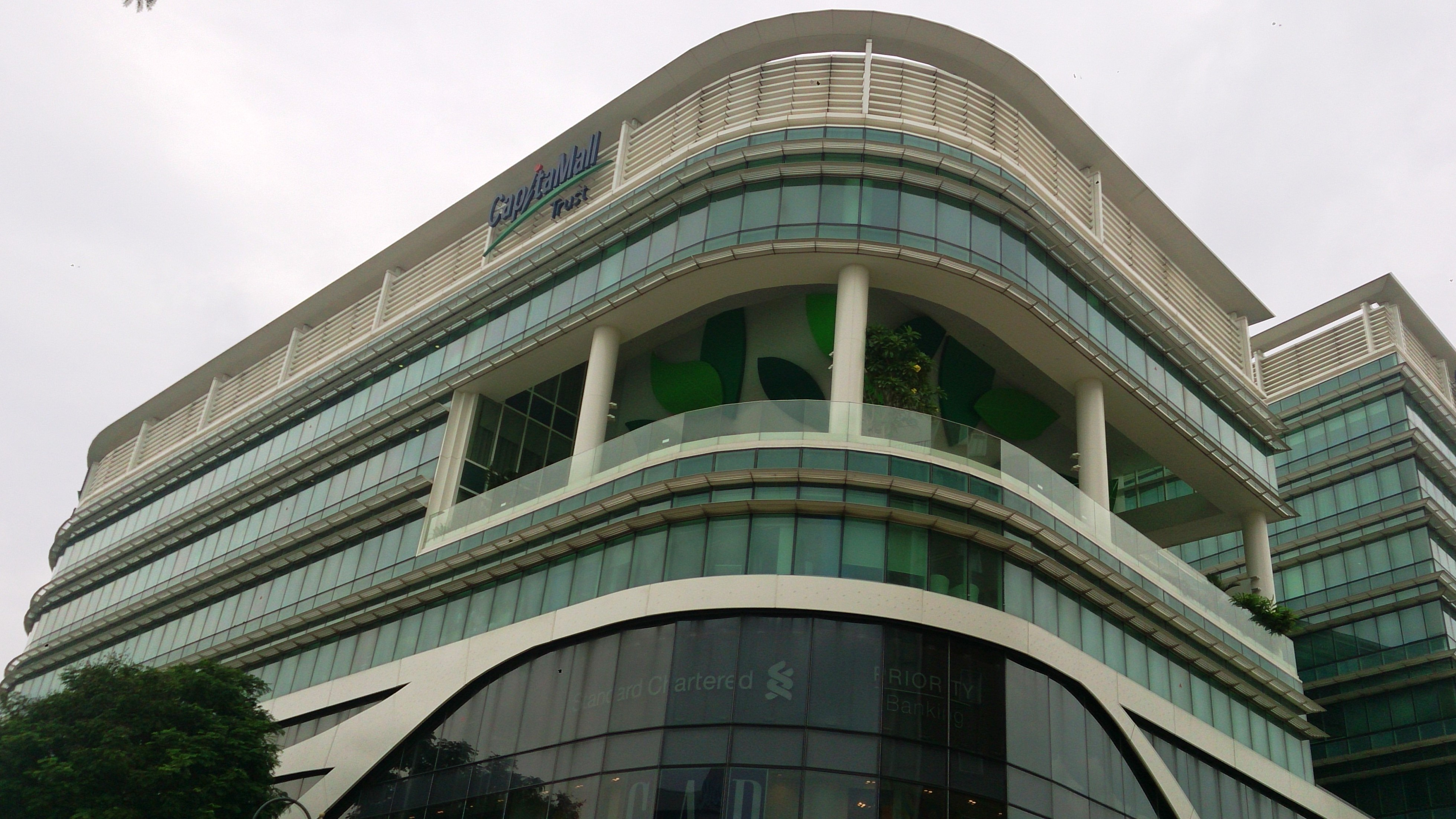
New wing of Plaza Singapura in 2013

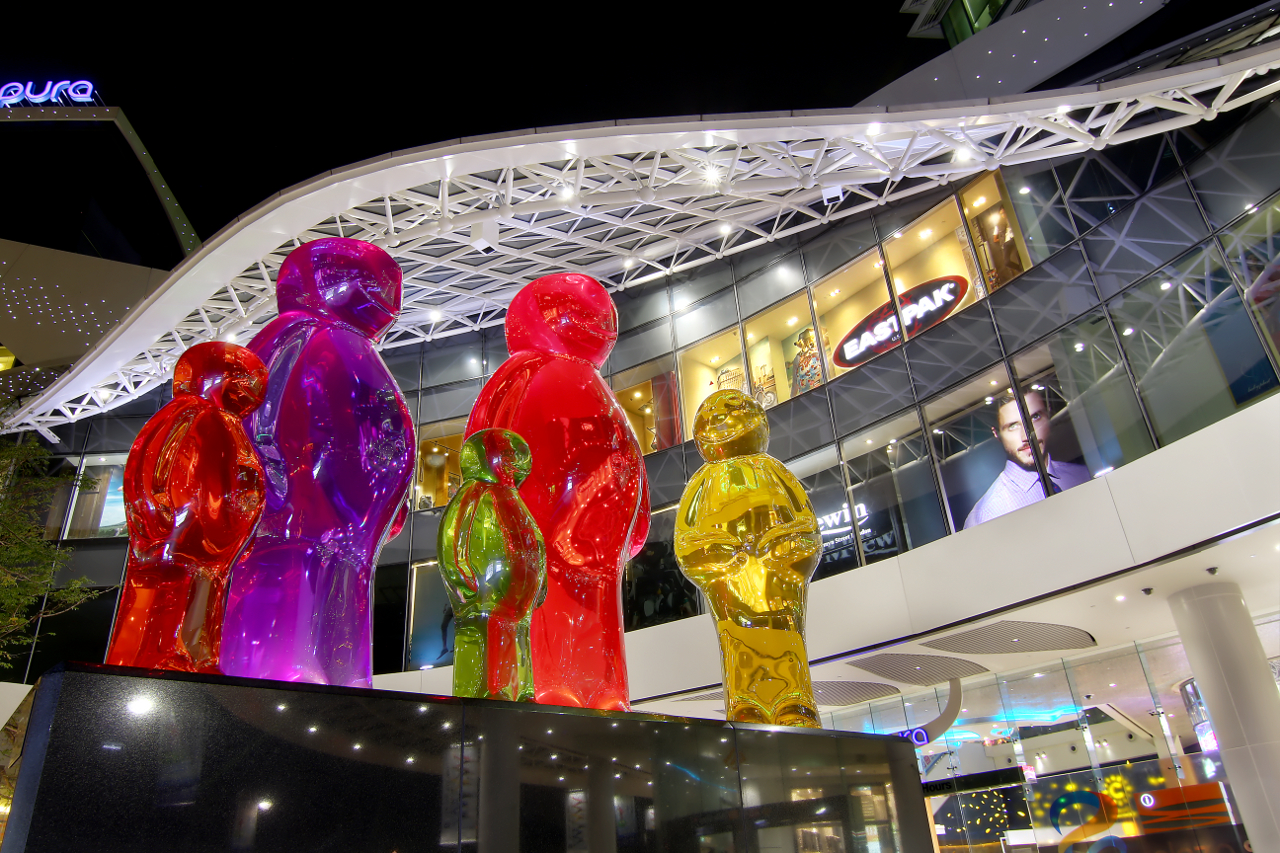
Jelly Baby Family by Italian artist Mauro Peruchetti

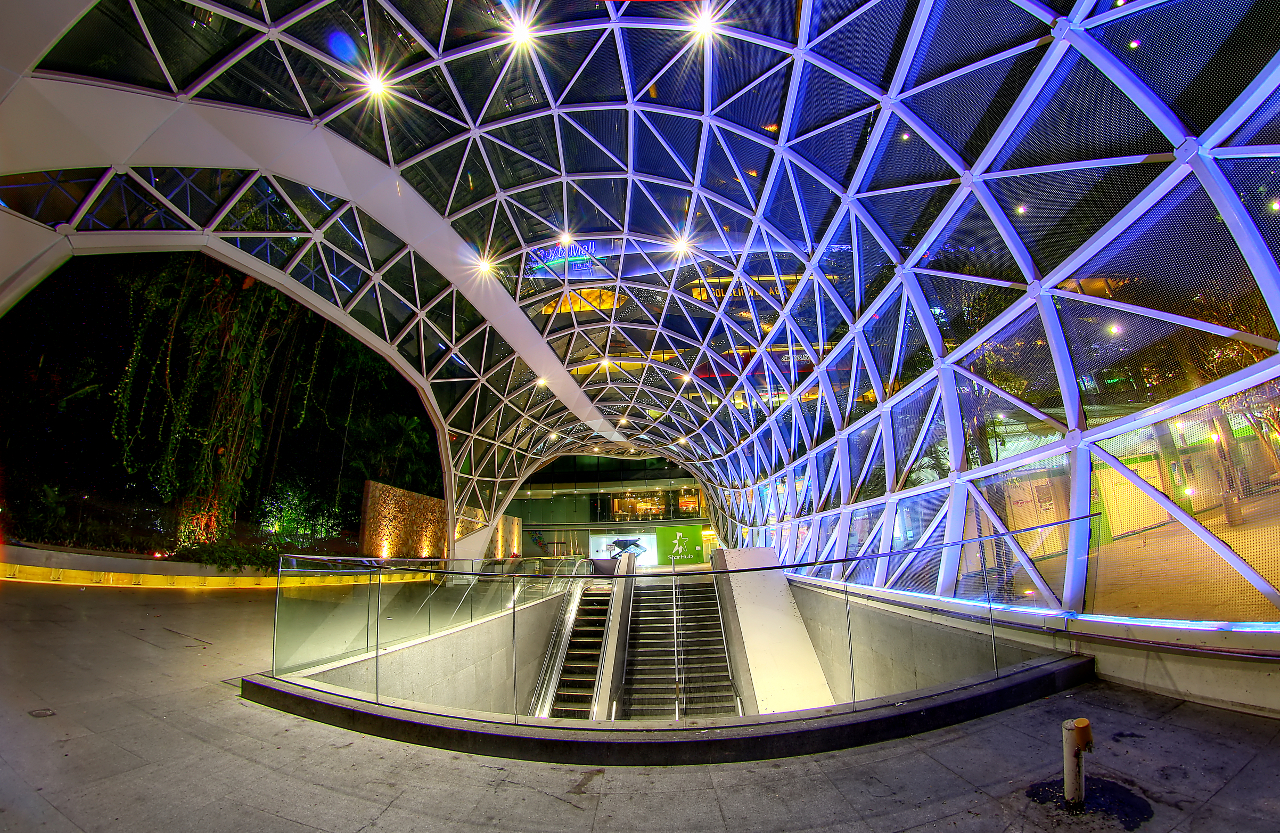
Plaza Singapura underpass in 2013

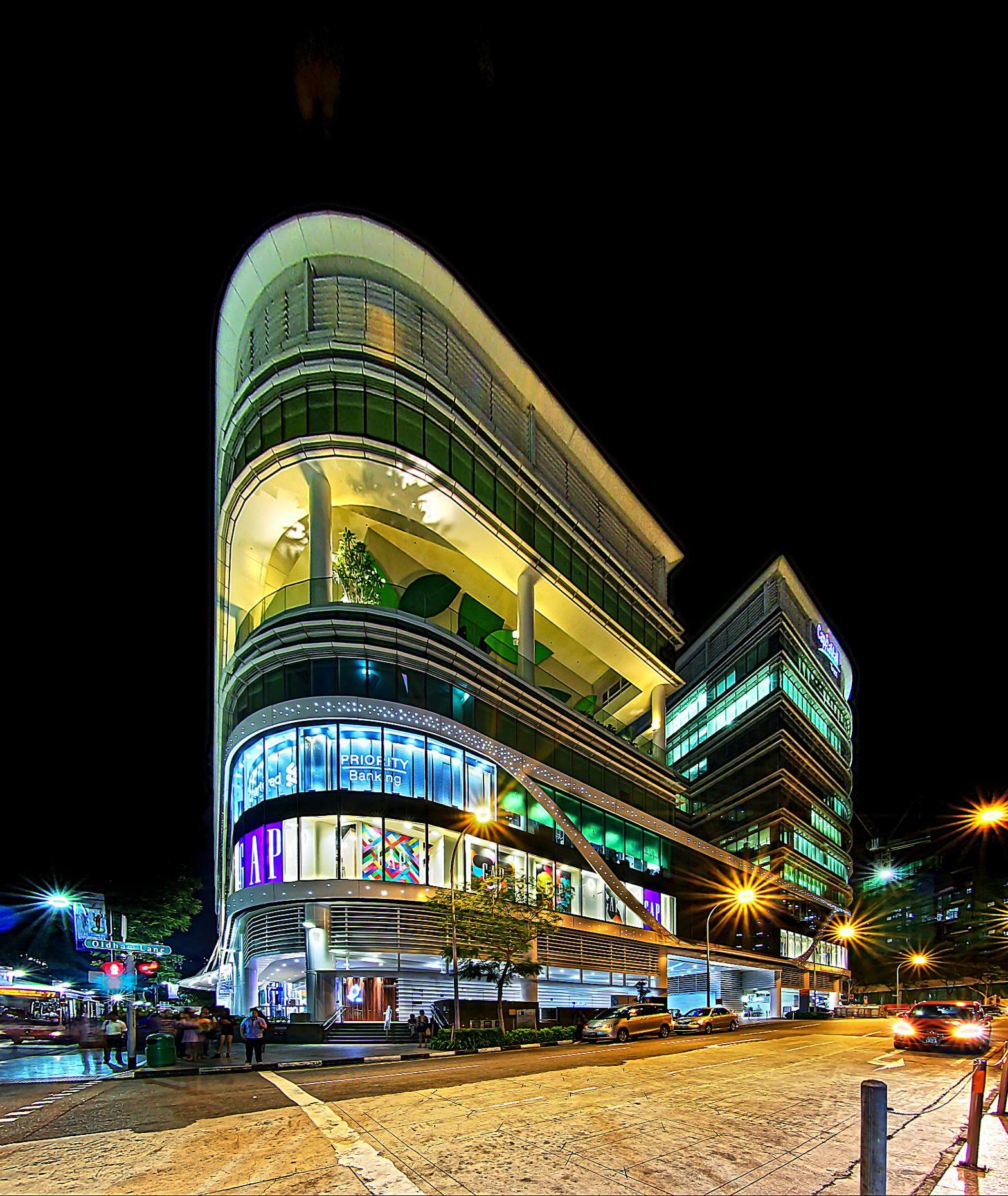
The Atrium@Orchard, now part of Plaza Singapura

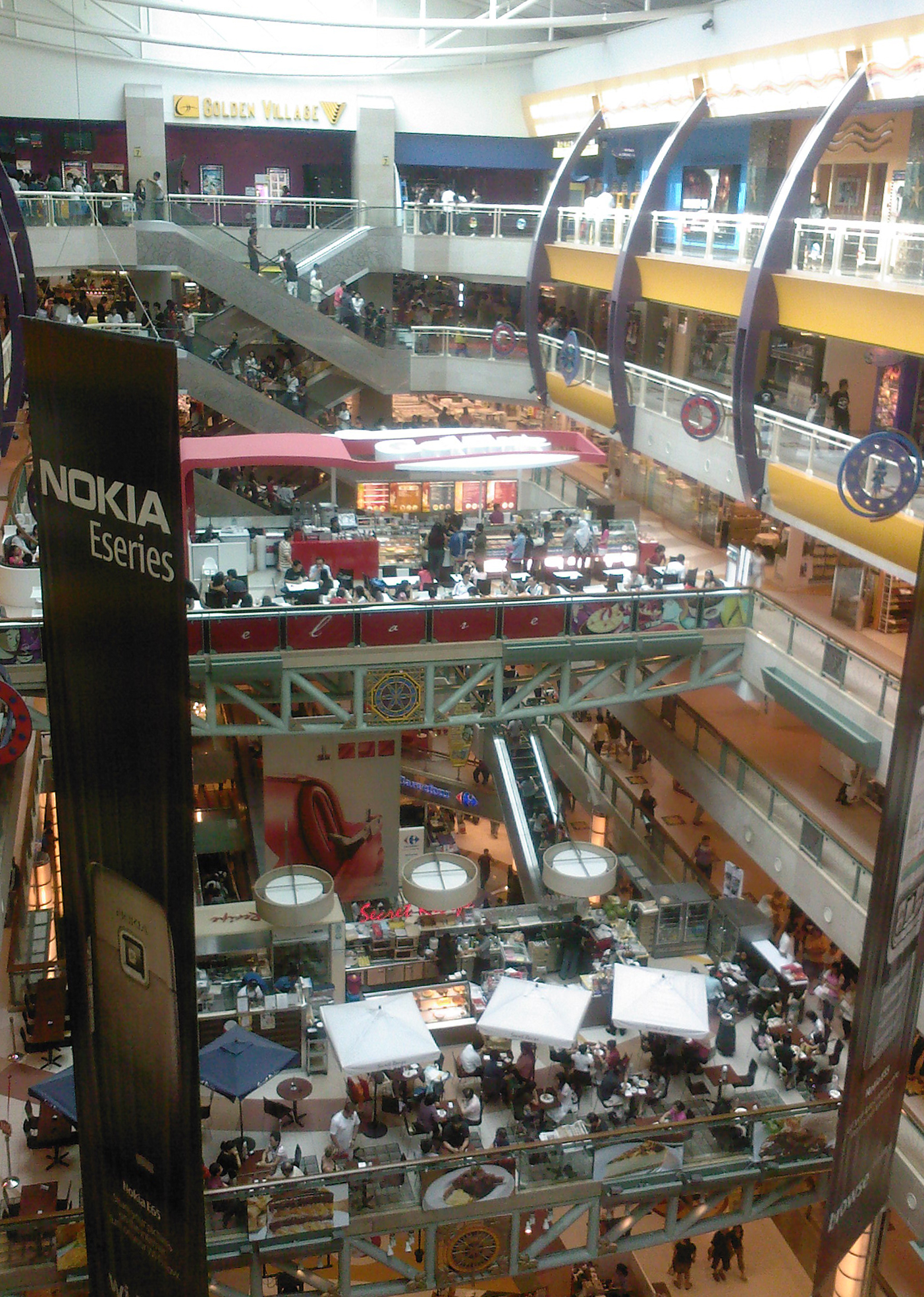
Interior of Plaza Singapura

== See also ==
- List of shopping malls in Singapore
