= Aeon (company) =

Japanese multinational retail holding company

Aeon Co., Ltd.

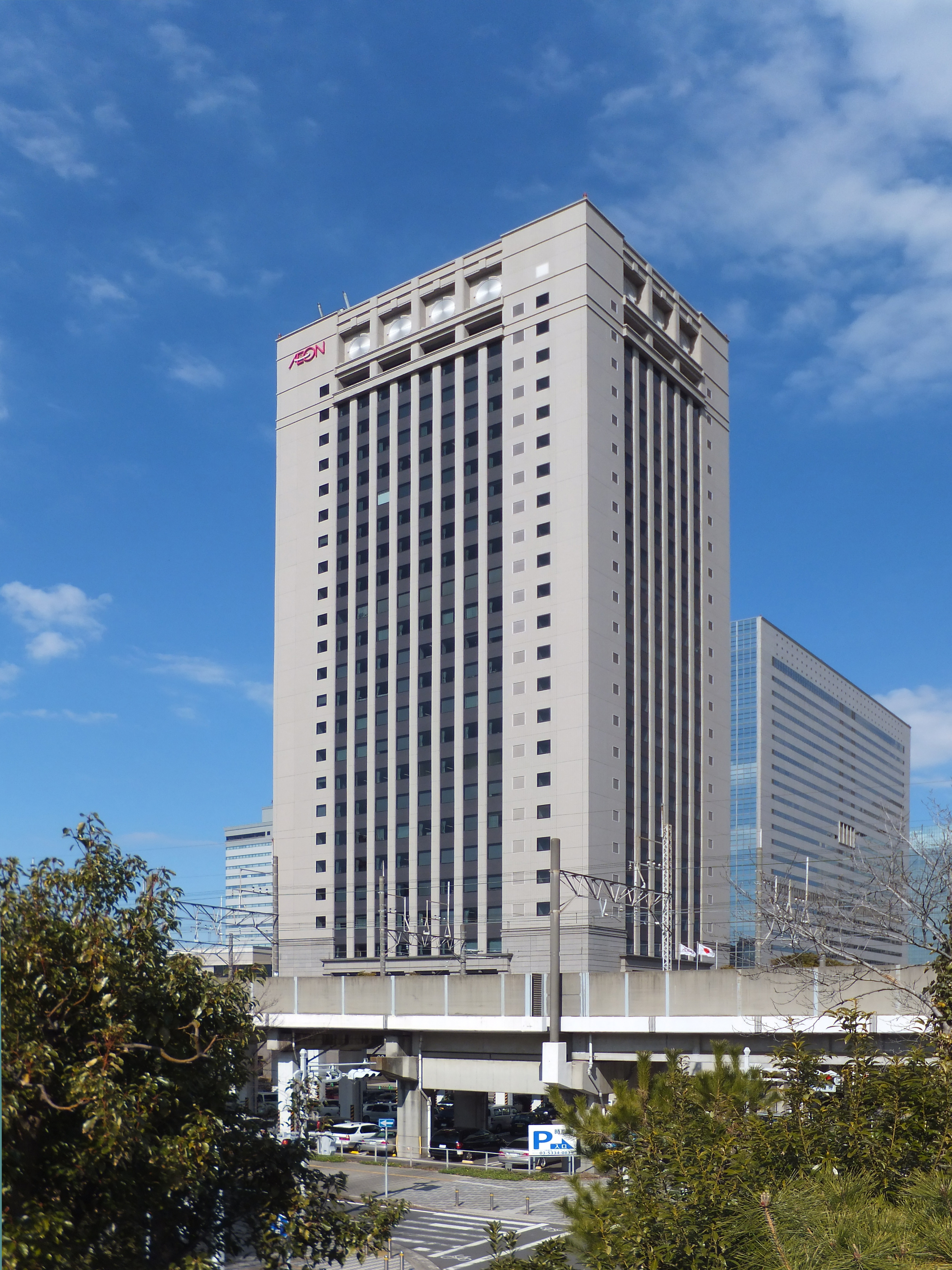
- Headquarters in ÆON Tower, Chiba, Japan
- Formerly: Jusco Co., Ltd. (1969-2001)
- Type: Public
- Traded as: TYO: 8267; Nikkei 225 component; TOPIX Large70 component
- Industry: Retail
- Founded: September 21, 1926; 100 years ago (as Kabushiki gaisha Okada-ya Gofukuten, in Yokkaichi, Mie Prefecture)
- Headquarters: Aeon's headquarters in Mihama-ku, Chiba, Chiba Prefecture, Japan
- Number of locations: 20,008 stores (2023)
- Area served: Asia
- Key people: Motoya Okada (岡田 元也 Okada Motoya), President
- Services: Apparel/footwear specialty; Convenience store; Department store; Discount store; Pharmacy; Home improvement; Hypermarket; Supermarket; Movie theaters
- Revenue: ▲¥8,176,732 million (FY 2016)
- Net income: ▲¥52,707 million (FY 2016)
- Total assets: ▲¥8,225,874 million (FY 2016)
- Total equity: ▲¥1,819,474 million (FY 2017)
- Owners: MTBJ investment trusts (6.37%); JTSB investment trusts (5.88%); Mizuho Bank (3.93%); AEON Environmental Foundation (2.56%); Okada family (2.51%); Norinchukin Bank (2.14%)
- Number of employees: 560,000+ (2023)
- Subsidiaries: List: Aeon Hokkaidō; Aeon Tōhoku; Aeon Kyūshū; Aeon Ryūkyū; Aeon Retail; BonBelta; Sunday; Aeon Super Center; Topvalu Collection; Aeon Bike; Aeon Liqour; Origin Tōshū; United Super Market Holdings (53.67%); Maxvalu Minami-Tōhoku; Maxvalu Kantō; Maxvalu Tōkai; Maxvalu Hokuriku; Maxvalu Nishi-nihon; Aeon Market; Maruetsu; Kasumi; Kohyo; Daiei; Fuji Retailing; Red Cabbage; Aeon Maxvalu (Guangzhou) Co., Ltd.; Aeon Big; Ministop; My Basket; Bio c' Bon Japon; Marudai Sakurai Pharmacy; Aeon Body; Aeon Wellness; Welcia Holdings (50.54%); Aeon Bank; Aeon Product Finance; Aeon Credit Service; AFA Corporation; Aeon Insurance Service; Aeon Allianz Life Insurance; Aeon Mortgage Loan Service; Aeon Mall; Aeon Town; OPA; Aeon Fantasy; Aeon Delight; Miraiya Shoten; Mega Sports; Aeon Eaheart; Aeon Pet; Aeon Entertainment; G-Foot (66.88); Can Do (51.15%); Aeon Topvalu; Aeon Agri Creat; Aeon Bakery; Aeon Food Supply
- Website: aeon.info

Aeon Co., Ltd. (Japanese: イオン株式会社, Hepburn: Ion Kabushiki gaisha; [iꜜoɴ]; occasionally stylized as ÆON), formerly Jusco Co., Ltd. (Japanese: ジャスコ株式会社, Hepburn: Jasuko Kabushiki gaisha), is a Japanese diversified retail holding company. It is one of the largest retail companies in Japan, owning Aeon hypermarkets, Aeon Mall and Aeon Town shopping malls, Daiei, MaxValu, Maruetsu, and My Basket supermarkets, Ministop convenience store, Welcia drugstore, Aeon Cinema movie theaters and Aeon Bank.

Aeon traces its origins back to 1758 during the Edo period in Japan when it was established as a small sundry goods store called Shinohara-ya (篠原屋). Later, it was renamed Okada-ya Gofuku (岡田屋呉服店) after the founding family. In 1970, Okada-ya merged with several other companies it had established and became Jusco. Through a series of mergers and acquisitions, Jusco expanded and in 2001 changed its name to Aeon. In 2010, Aeon merged with its subsidiary retail companies and consolidated all its hypermarket brands such as Jusco, MYCALGroup and Saty under the Aeon name. In 2021, Aeon was the 17th largest retailer in the world by revenue.

== Naming ==
The name Aeon is a transliteration from the koine Greek word ὁ αἰών (ho aion), from the archaic αἰϝών (aiwon). The name and symbolism used in the branding (i.e., aeon) implies the eternal nature of the company.

== History ==
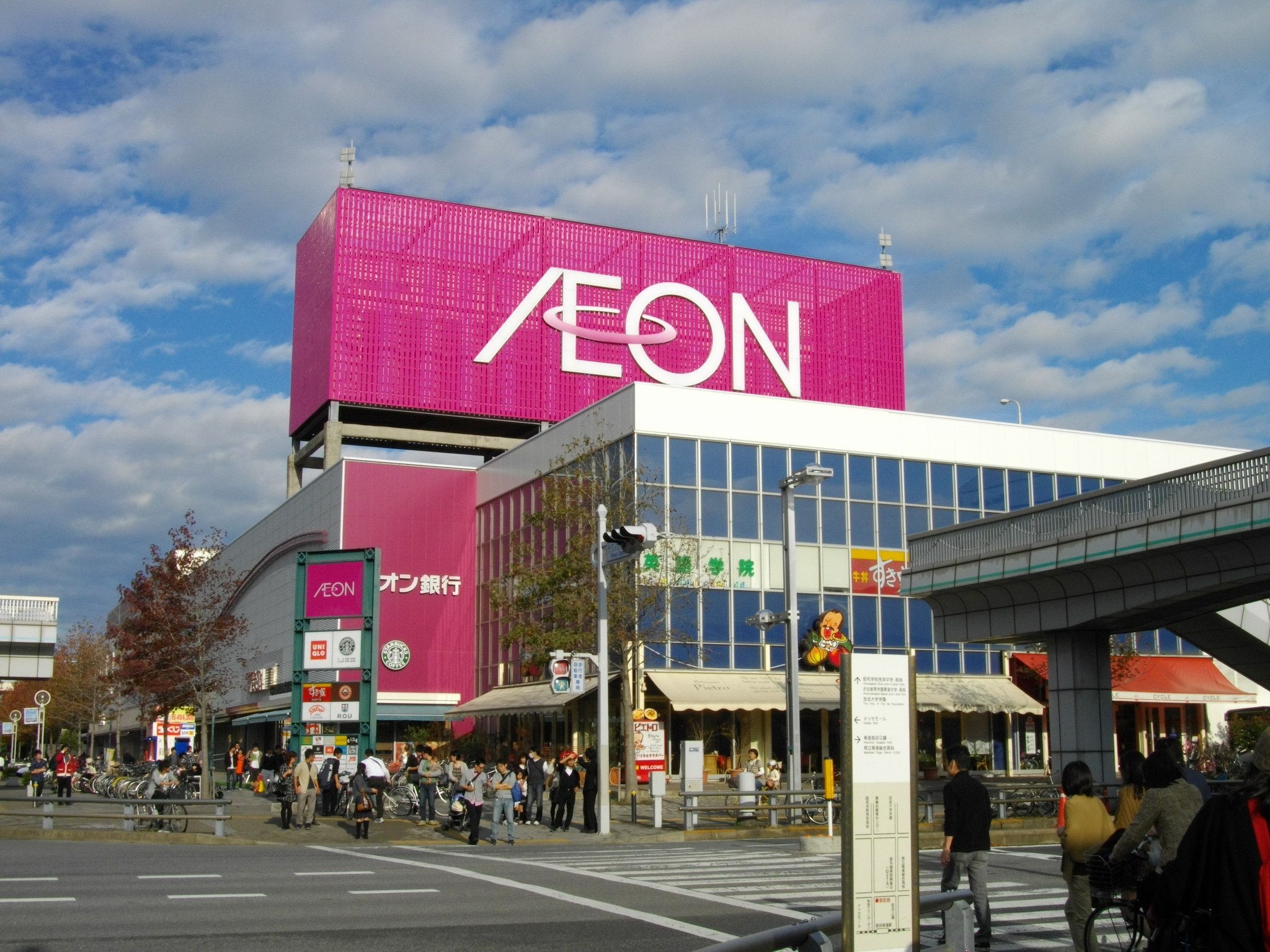
Aeon supermarket in Chiba

JUSCO (ジャスコ, Jasuko) is the acronym for Japan United Stores Company, a chain of "general merchandise stores" (or hypermarket) and the largest of its type in Japan.

The company was legally incorporated in September 1926 as Okadaya (founded in 1758). In 1970, Okadaya merged with Futagi and Shiro to form Jusco Co., Ltd. The employees voted to name the company "Japan United Stores Company". The various Jusco companies are subsidiaries of the Aeon supermarket chain. The Jusco name was adopted from a company founded as a kimono silk trader in 1758. Renamed Aeon in 1989, it operates stores throughout Japan under Jusco and other names and also has a presence in Malaysia, Hong Kong, mainland China and Thailand.

Aeon took over the Japanese operations of Yaohan in December 1997.

On August 21, 2001, the company became Aeon Co., Ltd. The largest Jusco (also the largest single-building shopping center in Japan) opened in 2005 in Mito. On August 21, 2008, the corporate structure changed. Aeon Co., Ltd. became a holding company while Aeon Retail Co., Ltd. took over the retail operations formerly held by Aeon Co., Ltd.

As of March 1, 2011, all Jusco and SATY stores under the Aeon umbrella in Japan changed their names to Aeon while all the Jusco stores and shopping centres in Malaysia have been fully re-branded into Aeon since March 2012. The Hong Kong and Mainland China subsidiaries officially changed their name to Aeon on 1 March 2013.

On July 28, 2026, an Aeon Mall in Kashima, Kumamoto partially collapsed after an explosion caused by an earthquake. Seven people were killed in the collapse and an additional five people had to be rescued from the wreckage.

== International ventures ==
Countries with Aeon stores

=== Malaysia ===
In 1983, Malaysian Prime Minister Mahathir Mohamad met with Takuya Okada and thought that he should bring Japanese supermarkets to Malaysia. The Malaysian operations of Aeon started as a jointly owned company with Cold Storage and three local companies, known as Jaya Jusco. It was the first time that a Japanese company had entered into a significant joint venture in the Malaysian retail industry.

The first Jusco store outside Japan was opened in the basement of Plaza Dayabumi, Kuala Lumpur, Malaysia in 1985.

Jusco assumed total operational control of the chain in 1988.

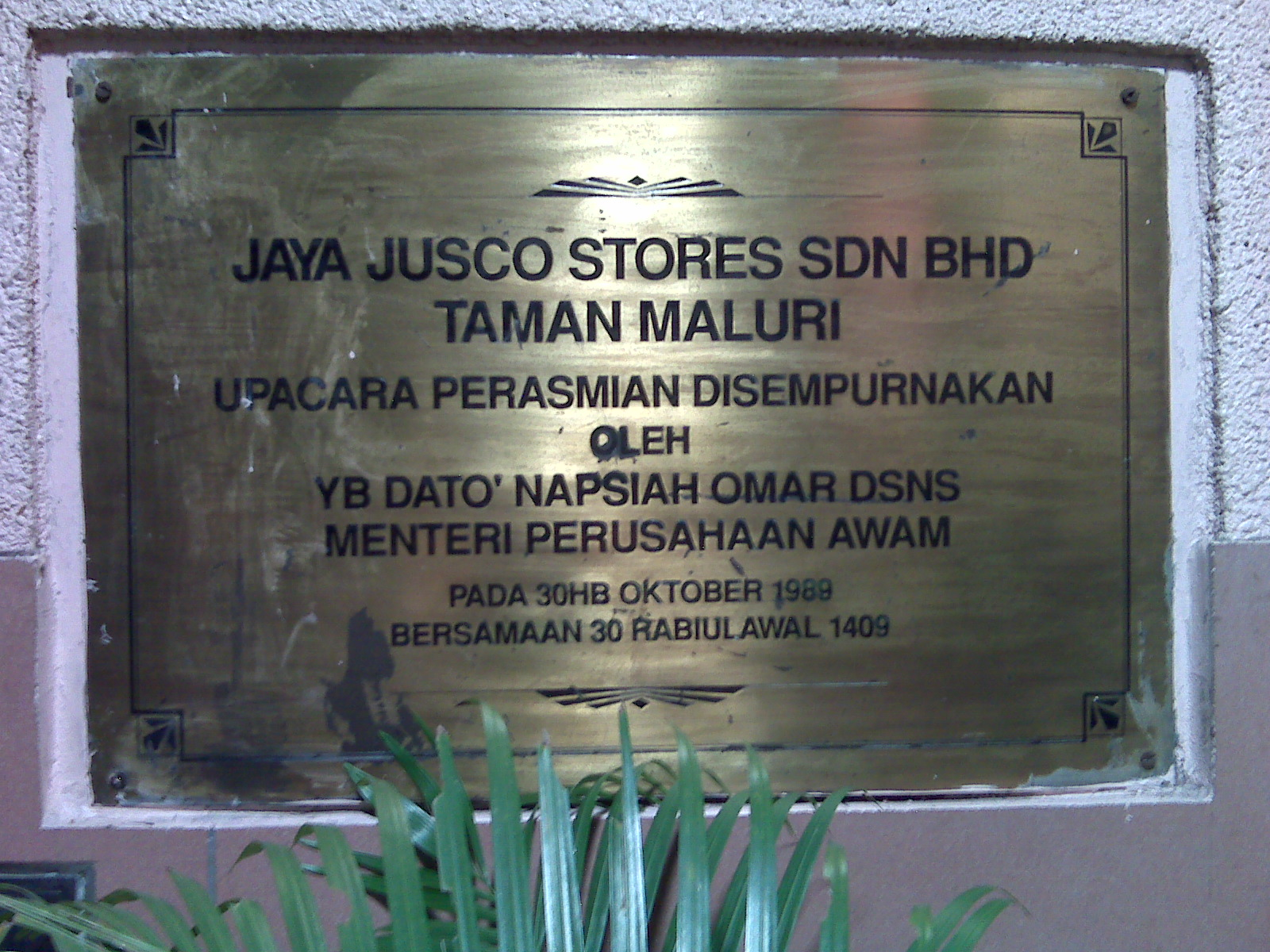
A plaque commemorating the opening of Jusco Taman Maluri on 30 October 1989

The oldest Jusco store in Malaysia is Jusco Taman Maluri located in Cheras, Kuala Lumpur. It opened on 30 October 1989.

Aeon's third outlet in Malacca opened in 1991 while its fourth at Wangsa Maju (Alpha Angle) opened in April 1992.

The Aeon Bukit Tinggi Shopping Centre in Bandar Bukit Tinggi, Klang, Selangor, Malaysia is the largest Aeon store in Malaysia and until 2024, was the overall largest in Southeast Asia, with over 200,000 square metres (2,200,000 sq ft) of built-up area and 5,000 car park bays.

Jusco in Malaysia is notable for being among the first general merchandise chains to introduce biodegradable polybags made from sweet potatoes.

In March 2012, all the Jusco stores and shopping centres in Malaysia were rebranded to Aeon, following the decision of Aeon in Japan. In November 2012, Aeon acquired the operation of Carrefour Malaysia with an enterprise value of €250 million. All of the current Carrefour hypermarkets and supermarkets in Malaysia were then fully re-branded into Aeon BiG. The acquisition of Carrefour Malaysia made Aeon as the second largest retailer in Malaysia, which combined the sales from Aeon Retail stores (formerly known as Jusco) and the former Carrefour outlets. Post-acquisition, Aeon's ASEAN business vice president said the retail giant targeted to open 100 outlets in various formats in the country by year 2020.

In April 2018, Aeon expanded to East Malaysia by opening their first mall in Kuching.

State	Stores
(Federal Territories of Malaysia) F.T. of Kuala Lumpur	6
Selangor	11
Perak	5
Johor	6
Negeri Sembilan	2
Malacca	2
Penang	2
Kelantan	1
Pahang	1
Sarawak	1

=== Vietnam ===
The first Jusco store "AEON MALL Tan Phu Celadon" opened on January 11, 2014, in Ho Chi Minh City at Tân Phú district. On October 28, 2015, Hanoi opened its first Jusco store "AEON MALL Long Bien" in Long Biên district with an investment of US$200 million. Vietnam has currently about 200 Jusco stores including 6 malls and several supermarkets. Jusco has announced in 2023 that the first Aeon mall will be opened in Central Vietnam in the city of Huế in 2024.

=== Cambodia ===
The first Jusco store in Cambodia was opened on June 30, 2014, in Phnom Penh at Tonlé Bassac district. As of September 2023, Cambodia has three Aeon Malls, all of them located in the capital Phnom Penh.

=== Mainland China ===
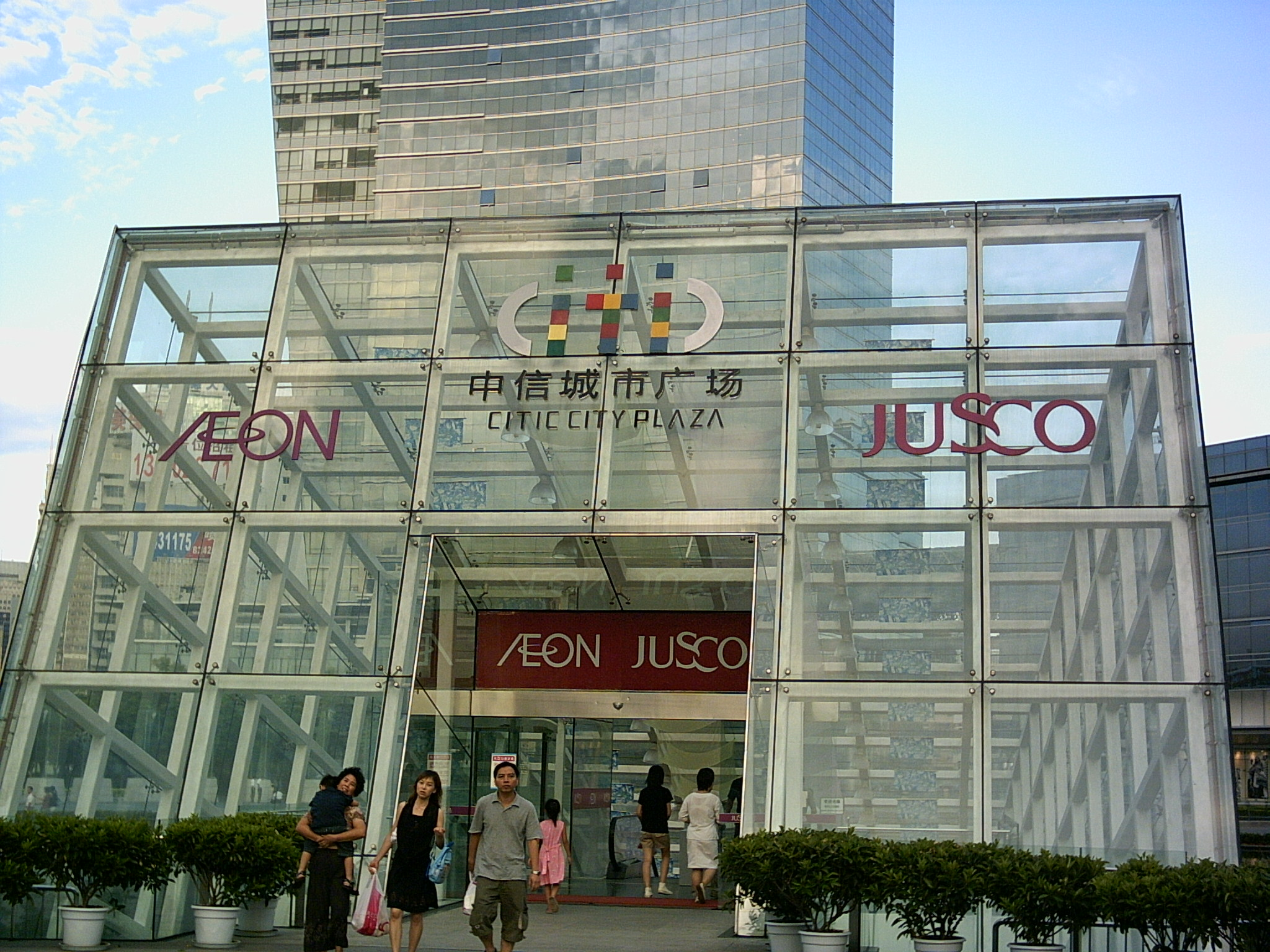
A Jusco store in Shenzhen, China

In Mainland China, Jusco uses Aeon and Jusco for its name. From 1996, Aeon Co., Ltd created many shopping mall named Jusco. In Shanghai, there was a Jusco before, but it divested finance finally because of poor management. In Guangdong, Guangdong Jusco Co., Ltd used the name "Jusco" to operate the first Jusco at 1996. Now, there are thirteen shops in Guangdong. Otherwise, Aeon also operated large shopping mall in Beijing and Shunde. It also planned to expand to North China. Jusco Mall was first opened in Qingdao in the late 90s (now Aeon) and quickly became a local popular especially for its supermarket.In Shenzhen, Aeon (永旺) has a number of large stores including one at Coastal city (Houhai station 后海).

=== Hong Kong ===
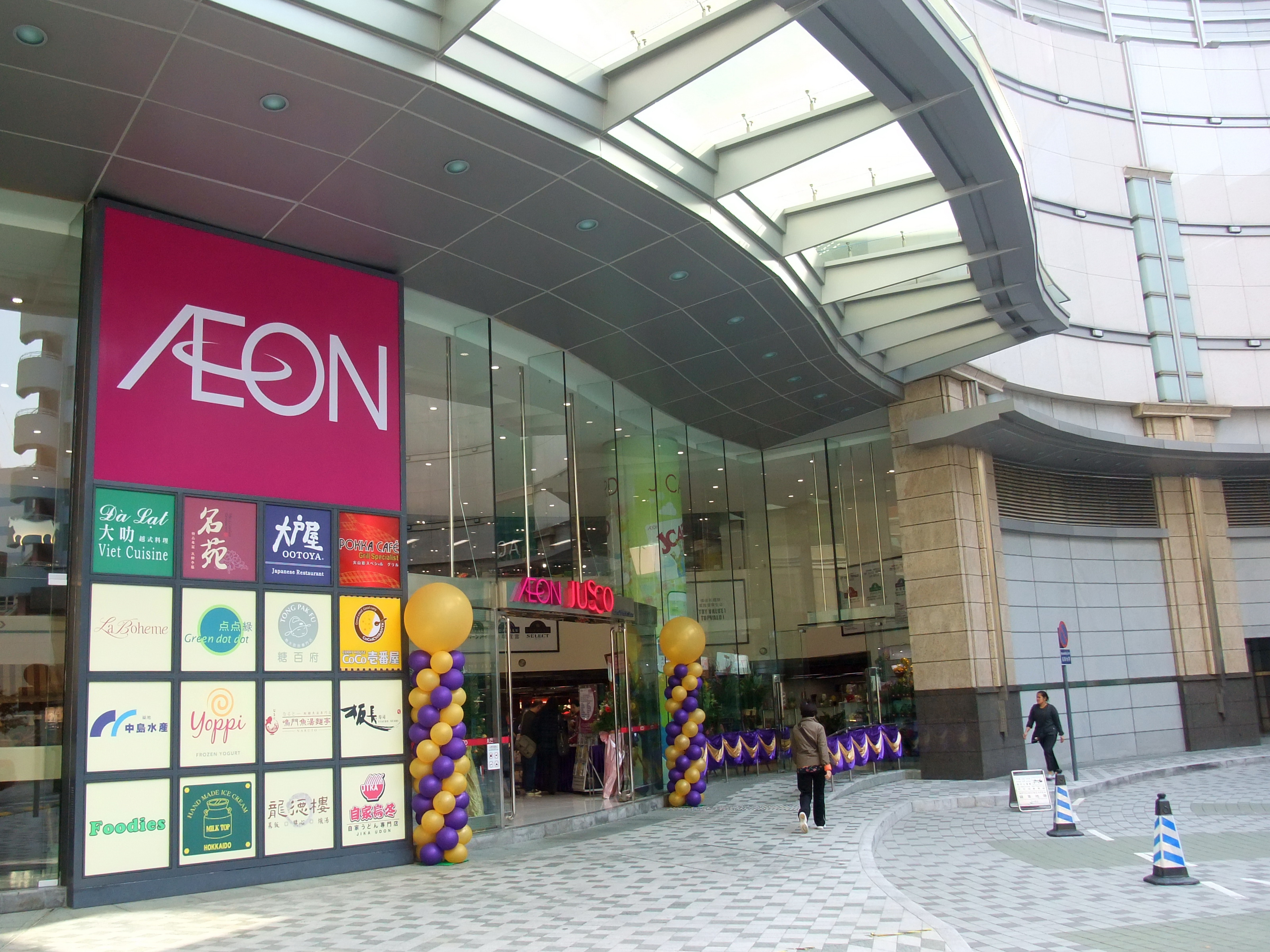
An Aeon store in Hong Kong

Aeon Stores (Hong Kong) Co., Limited was established in Hong Kong in November 1987 and listed on the Hong Kong Stock Exchange in February 1994. Aeon aims to develop a chain operation in Hong Kong and offer value-for-money merchandise to Hong Kong customers.

The Hong Kong Jusco subsidiary was established in November 1987 as Jusco Department Store Co. Ltd. The first Jusco store opened in Kornhill in December 1987 (another name for this store was Quarry Bay Main and Flagship store). It was listed in Hong Kong Exchanges and Clearing Limited on 4 February 1994 with the stock code 984.

Hong Kong Jusco has now been renamed as Aeon Stores (Hong Kong), and mainly manages shopping malls and other retail shops such as supermarkets, discount shops, home places, convenience stores and department stores. They offer low-cost and convenient daily necessities to customers including food, clothes, household items and electrical appliances. As of March 2013, there are eight Aeon General Merchandise Stores (GMS) in Hong Kong, seven branches of Aeon Supermarkets, 22 branches of Living Plaza by Aeon, 4 branches of BENTO EXPRESS by Aeon, 2 Aeon Style stores and only one branch of Aeon MaxValu Prime, which is located at The One, Tsim Sha Tsui.

=== Taiwan ===
Taiwan Jusco are subsidiaries of Taiwan Aeon Stores Co., Ltd. The first Jusco was in Windance in Hsinchu City. It was operated in 2003. The second Jusco was operated in December 2005 at New Taipei city global mall.

=== Thailand ===
All Juscos have been closed down in Bangkok, Thailand. Aeon Co., Ltd. and now use the MaxValu name instead.

=== Indonesia ===
The first AEON store in Indonesia was opened on May 30, 2015, in BSD City, Tangerang located in the western suburbs of Greater Jakarta. It was also the first AEON Mall in the country.

In September 2023, AEON opened the first store that is separate from the AEON Mall property in Mall Alam Sutera, Tangerang. In 2024, AEON opened its largest mall in Southeast Asia at Kota Deltamas, Cikarang.

== See also ==
- Aeon Cup
- Don Quijote (store)
- Maxvalu Tokai
