= MaxValu =

Japanese retail store chain

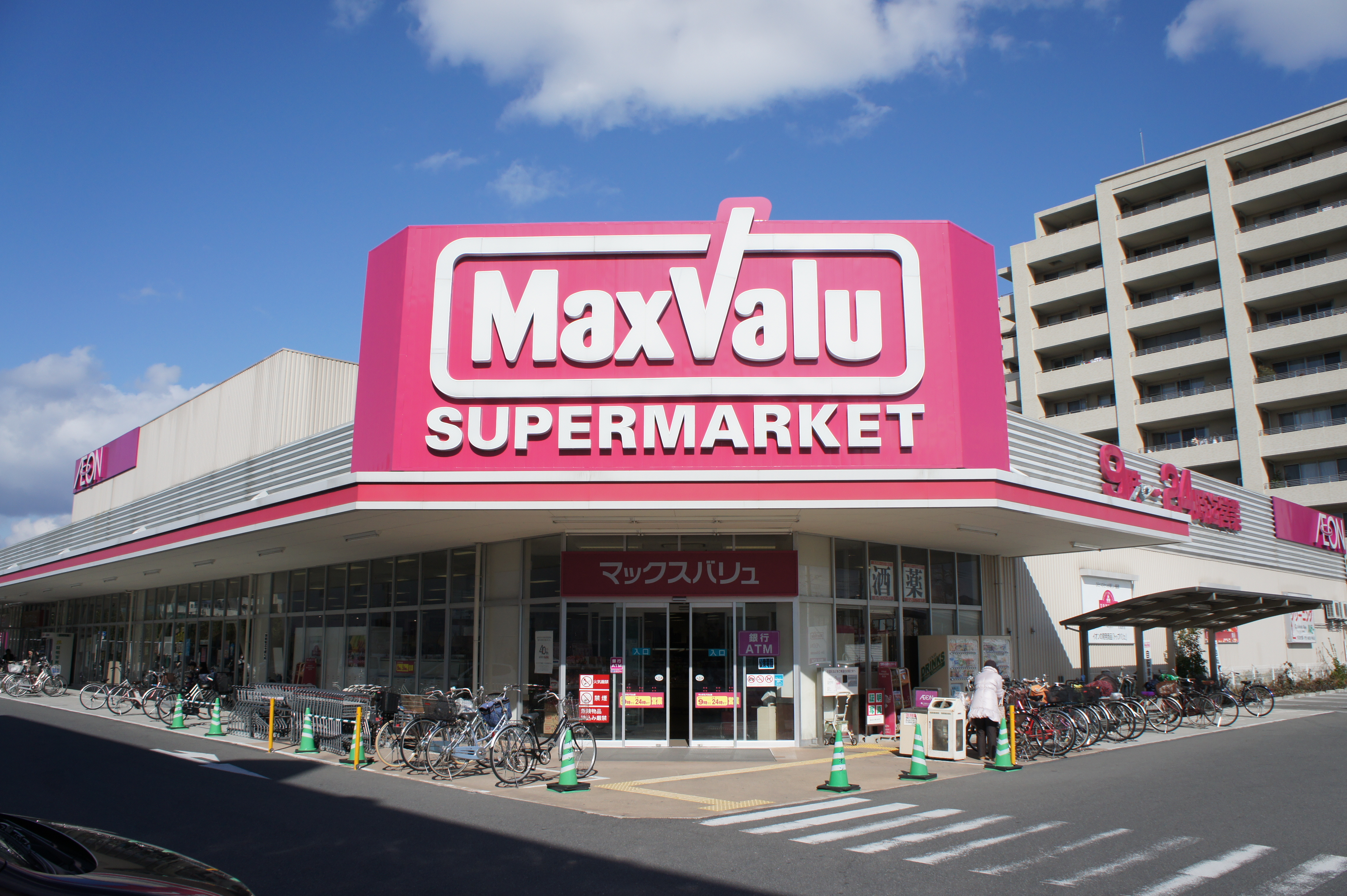
A MaxValu in Osaka, Japan

MaxValu (マックスバリュ) is a Japanese supermarket chain owned by the Aeon Group. It is operated by multiple regional subsidiaries in Japan and abroad. Maxvalu Tokai Co., Ltd. (マックスバリュ東海株式会社, Makkusubaryu Tōkai Kabushiki-gaisha) (TYO: 8198) was formerly known as Yaohan until 2000, when it was renamed following bankruptcy and acquisition by Aeon.

== MaxValu in other countries ==
=== Thailand ===
In 2008, Aeon rebranded all JUSCO stores in Thailand to Maxvalu Tokai. In 2012, Maxvalu Tokai in Thailand had a total of 68 stores. Maxvalu Tokai in Thailand has two formats and brands of supermarket:

- MaxValu Supermarket (Thai: แม็กซ์แวลู ซูเปอร์มาเก็ต) is a full-scale format of supermarket, around 1,000-3,000 square meters.
- MaxValu Tanjai (แม็กซ์แวลู ทันใจ) is a mini-scale format of supermarket, around 300-800 square meters.

MaxValu is set to leave Thailand after Central Group acquired MaxValu locations and turn them into Tops.

=== Malaysia ===
In Malaysia, MaxValu stores carry the MaxValu Prime or Pasar Raya MaxValu (MaxValu Supermarket in Malay) brands. They take up a smaller format (typically only one floor), unlike full Aeon outlets in Malaysia. Currently there are 7 stores throughout Peninsular Malaysia:

State	Stores
(Federal Territories of Malaysia) Federal Territory of Kuala Lumpur	4
Selangor	2
Johor	1

=== China ===
Maxvalu has presence in Happy Valley, Zhujiang New Town, Tianhe, Guangzhou.
