= Executive Council of Macau =

Council that advises and assists the Chief Executive of Macau

The Executive Council (Chinese: 行政會; Portuguese: Conselho Executivo) is a formal body of advisers to the Chief Executive of Macau that serves as a core policy-making organ of the Government of Macau.

== Composition ==
The members of Executive Council are appointed by the Chief Executive from among principal officials (heads of department, informally called "ministers"), members of Legislative Council, and public figures. Their appointment and removal is decided by the Chief Executive. There is no fixed term of office, but the term of office of members cannot extend beyond the expiry of that of the Chief Executive who appoints them.

The following list includes all members of the Executive Council in the order of precedence:

- Note: To avoid confusion, all the names on this list follow the Macau convention: Portuguese name <if available>, family name, (Chinese given name <if available>) for consistency.

Office	Name
Chief Executive	Ho Iat Seng
Administration and Justice Secretary	Cheong Weng Chon
Economy and Finance Secretary	Lei Wai Nong
Security Secretary	Wong Sio Chak
Social Affairs and Culture Secretary	Ao Ieong U
Transport and Public Works Secretary	Raimundo Arrais do Rosário
Commissioner Against Corruption	Chan Tsz King
Commissioner of Audit	Ho Veng On
Public Prosecutor-General	Ip Son Sang
Members	Leonel Alberto Alves (歐安利); Peter Lam Kam Seng (林金城); Chan Chak Mo (陳澤武); Frederico Ma Chi Ngai (馬志毅); Lee Chong Cheng (李從正); Chan Ka Leong (陳家良); Iau Teng Pio (邱庭彪); Ieong Tou Hong (楊道匡); Zhang Zong Zhen (張宗真); Chao Weng Hou (周永豪)

== List of the past Executive Councils ==
=== 1st ExCo (1999–2004) ===
Office	Name
Chief Executive	Edmund Ho Hau Wah
Administration and Justice Secretary	Florinda da Rosa Silva Chan Lai Man
Economy and Finance Secretary	Francis Tam Pak Yuen
Security Secretary	Cheong Kuoc Vá
Social Affairs and Culture Secretary	Fernando Chui Sai On
Transport and Public Works Secretary	Ao Man Long
Commissioner Against Corruption	Cheong U
Commissioner Of Audit	Fátima Choi
Public Prosecutor-General	Ho Chio Meng
Members	Tong Chi Kin (唐志堅) (Convenor); Victor Ng Wing Lok (吳榮恪); Leong Heng Teng (梁慶庭); Liu Chak Wan (廖澤雲); Alexandre Ma Iao Lai (馬有禮)

=== 2nd ExCo (2004–2009) ===
Office	Name
Chief Executive	Edmund Ho Hau Wah
Administration and Justice Secretary	Florinda da Rosa Silva Chan Lai Man
Economy and Finance Secretary	Francis Tam Pak Yuen
Security Secretary	Cheong Kuoc Vá
Social Affairs and Culture Secretary	Fernando Chui Sai On
Transport and Public Works Secretary	Ao Man Long
Commissioner Against Corruption	Cheong U
Commissioner Of Audit	Fátima Choi
Public Prosecutor-General	Ho Chio Meng
Members	Tong Chi Kin (唐志堅) (Convenor); Leong Heng Teng (梁慶庭); Liu Chak Wan (廖澤雲); Alexandre Ma Iao Lai (馬有禮); Ho Iat Seng; Leonel Alberto Alves; Cheang Chi Keong (鄭志強); Lam Heong Sang (林香生); Lionel Leong Vai Tac

=== 3rd ExCo (2009–2014) ===
Office	Name
Chief Executive	Fernando Chui Sai On
Administration and Justice Secretary	Florinda da Rosa Silva Chan Lai Man
Economy and Finance Secretary	Francis Tam Pak Yuen
Security Secretary	Cheong Kuoc Vá
Social Affairs and Culture Secretary	Cheong U
Transport and Public Works Secretary	Lau Si Io
Commissioner Against Corruption	Vasco Fong Man Chong
Commissioner Of Audit	Ho Veng On
Public Prosecutor-General	Ho Chio Meng
Members	Leong Heng Teng (梁慶庭) (Convenor); Liu Chak Wan (廖澤雲); Alexandre Ma Iao Lai (馬有禮); Leonel Alberto Alves; Cheang Chi Keong (鄭志強); Lionel Leong Vai Tac; Chan Meng Kam; Ho Sut Heng (何雪卿); Eddie Wong Yue Kai (黃如楷); Peter Lam Kam Seng (林金城)

=== 4th ExCo (2014–2019) ===
Office	Name
Chief Executive	Fernando Chui Sai On
Administration and Justice Secretary	Sonia Chan Hoi Fan
Economy and Finance Secretary	Lionel Leong Vai Tac
Security Secretary	Wong Sio Chak
Social Affairs and Culture Secretary	Alexis Tam Chong Veng
Transport and Public Works Secretary	Raimundo Arrais do Rosário
Commissioner Against Corruption	André Cheong Weng Chon (張永春)
Commissioner of Audit	Ho Veng On (何永安)
Public Prosecutor-General	Ip Son Sang (葉迅生)
Members	Leong Heng Teng (梁慶庭) (Convenor); Liu Chak Wan (廖澤雲); Alexandre Ma Iao Lai (馬有禮); Leonel Alberto Alves; Cheang Chi Keong (鄭志強); Chan Meng Kam; Ho Sut Heng (何雪卿); Eddie Wong Yue Kai (黃如楷); Peter Lam Kam Seng (林金城); Chan Chak Mo (陳澤武)

== See also ==
- Politics of Macau
- Legislative Assembly of Macau
