= Government of Macau =

Principal executive body of Macau SAR

Government of the Macao Special Administrative Region
- Emblem of Macau
- Formation: 20 December 1999; 26 years ago
- Founding document: Macao Basic Law
- Country: China
- Website: www.gov.mo

Legislative branch
- Legislature: Legislative Assembly
- Speaker: President
- Meeting place: Legislative Assembly Building

Executive branch
- Leader: Chief Executive
- Appointed by: Premier, State Council of China
- Headquarters: Macau Government Headquarters
- Main organ: Executive Council

Judicial branch
- Court: Court of Final Appeal (See also Judiciary of Macau)
- Seat: Superior Court of Macau Building

Government of Macau

Chinese name
- Traditional Chinese: 澳門特別行政區政府
- Simplified Chinese: 澳门特别行政区政府
Transcriptions
Standard Mandarin
- Hanyu Pinyin: Àomén Tèbiéxíngzhèngqū Zhèngfǔ
Yue: Cantonese
- Jyutping: ou3 mun4*2 dak6 bit6 hang4 zing3 keoi1 zing3 fu2

Abbreviation
- Chinese: 澳門政府
Transcriptions
Standard Mandarin
- Hanyu Pinyin: Àomén Zhèngfǔ
Yue: Cantonese
- Jyutping: ou^{3} mun^{2} zing^{3} fu^{2}

Portuguese name
- Portuguese: Governo da Região Administrativa Especial de Macau

The Government of the Macao Special Administrative Region, commonly known as the Macao Government, is the executive authorities of Macau. Formed on 20 December 1999 in accordance with the Sino-Portuguese Joint Declaration, it is headed by secretariats or commissioners and report directly to the chief executive. The affairs of the government are decided by secretaries, who are appointed by the chief executive and endorsed by the State Council of the Central People's Government in Beijing. As a special administrative region of China, Macau has a high degree of autonomy, in light of the "One Country, Two Systems" policy. The Macau Government, financially independent from the Central People's Government, oversees the affairs of Macau.

== Head of government ==
The chief executive is responsible for the administration of Macau. The affairs of the government are decided by secretariats, who are appointed by the chief executive and endorsed by the State Council of the People's Republic of China in Beijing. The office of chief executive replaced that of governor after 1999 as head of the government in Macau. The chief executive reports to the State Council.

The current chief executive is Sam Hou Fai and Hoi Lai Fong is the chief of the Office of the Chief Executive.

== Principal officials ==
The secretaries are similar to the Hong Kong Government policy bureaux secretaries. However, there are fewer secretaries in Macau, and they are considered part of the civil service instead of officials employed on contracts. The current (fifth) government was inaugurated in December 2019.

The principal officials of the current government are:

- Secretary for Administration and Justice – Wong Sio Chak
- Secretary for Economy and Finance – Ng Wai Han
- Secretary for Security – Chan Tsz King
  - Commissioner General of the Unitary Police Service – Leong Man Cheong
  - Director General of the Macao Customs – Adriano Marques Ho
- Secretary for Social Affairs and Culture – O Lam
- Secretary for Transport and Public Works – Tam Vai Man
- Commissioner Against Corruption – Ao Ieong Seong
- Commissioner of Audit – Ao Ieong U

== Organisation of government ==
Each secretary leads a number of bureaux (Chinese: 局 or 署; Portuguese: direcções or instituto, lit. 'directorate or institutes'), which carry out decisions and plans made by the secretaries.

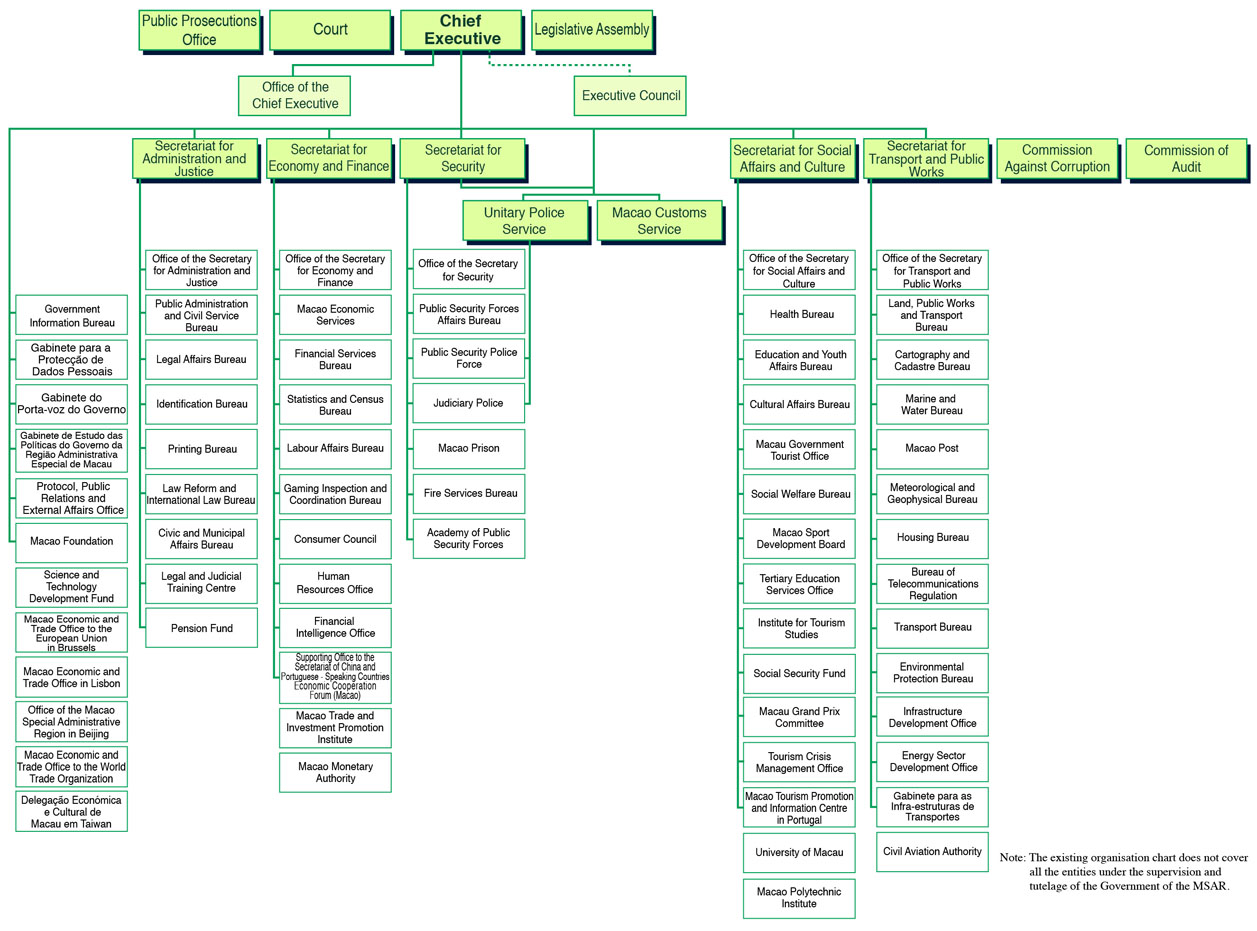

== Pre-1999 government ==
The structure of the Portuguese administration in Macau was slightly different from the current:

- Governor of Macau as Head of Government
- Secretary for Economic Coordination
- Secretary for Transport and Public Works
- Secretary for Justice
- Secretary for Social Affairs and Budget
- Secretary for Public Administration, Education and Youth
- Secretary for Public Security
- Secretary for Communications, Tourism and Culture

Localisation of key positions was non-existent prior to the handover, all department heads were Portuguese. Chinese civil service heads did not appear until after the establishment of the special administrative region. Currently, many government officials received education in mainland China; some of them even grew up in China.

== See also ==
- Government Information Bureau - the media department of Macau Gov.
- Government of Hong Kong
- Government of China
  - Macau Liaison Office
- Chinese Communist Party
  - Central Leading Group on Hong Kong and Macau Affairs
  - Hong Kong and Macau Affairs Office
