= 2009 Macanese Chief Executive election =

Administrative member selection

← 2004	26 July 2009	2014 →

All 300 votes of the Election Committee 151 votes needed to win
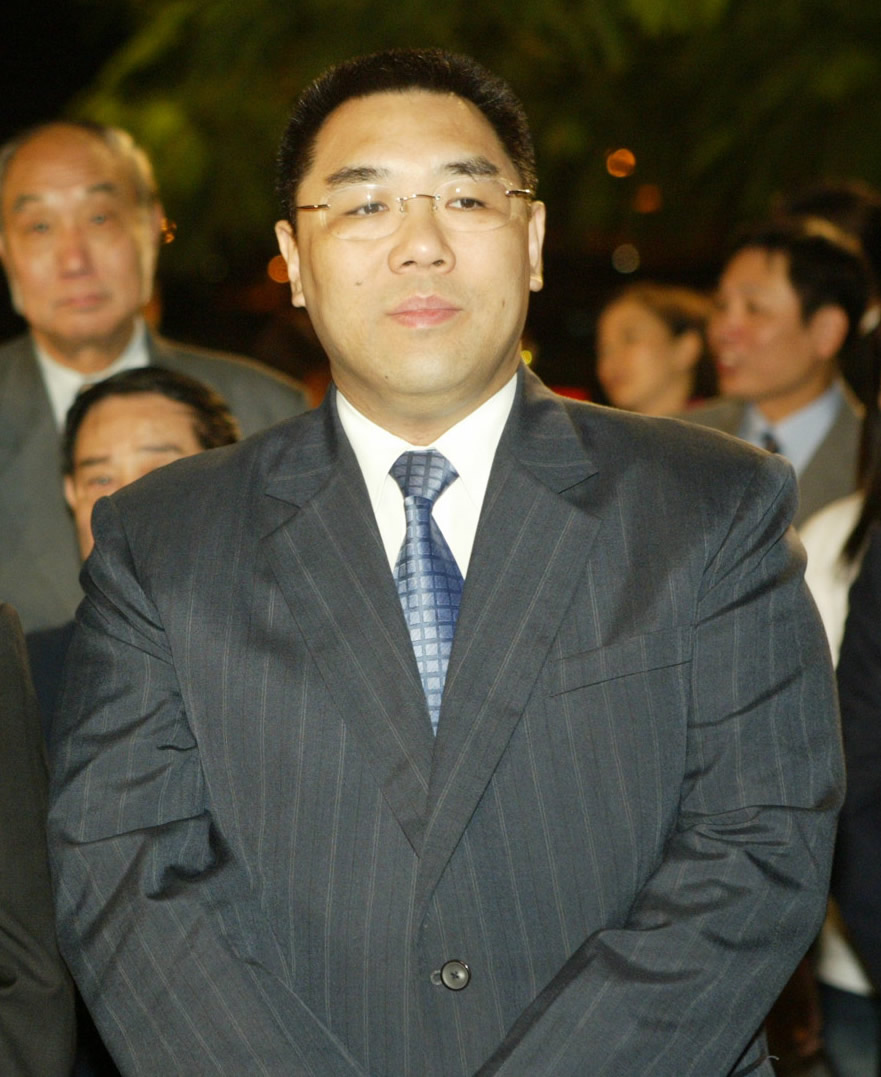
Candidate	Fernando Chui
Party	Independent
Alliance	Pro-Beijing
Electoral vote	282
Chief Executive before election
Edmund Ho
Independent
Elected Chief Executive
Fernando Chui
Independent

Chief Executive elections were held in Macau on 26 July 2009 for the third term of the Chief Executive of Macau (CE), the highest office of the Macau Special Administrative Region. Fernando Chui was elected without contest after incumbent Chief Executive Edmund Ho was ineligible for re-election due to having served two terms.

== Background ==
Under the Basic Law of Macau, the mini-constitution, incumbent Chief Executive Edmund Ho was ineligible to run again for the top office as he was re-elected in 2004, meaning a new leader must be selected. Rumours started floating around in 2007, suggesting various high-ranking officials will be running in the election, including Secretary for Social Affairs and Culture Fernando Chui, Procurator General Ho Chio-meng, member of the Standing Committee of the National People's Congress and Executive Council of Macau Ho Iat-seng, Secretary of Economy and Finance Francis Tam, and Lionel Leong, but some later publicly rejected. He argued that he was only 54 and none of those potential candidates were as capable as him, some claimed Ho could stage a comeback in the next election despite setting an unfavorable precedent.

== Campaign ==
On 12 May 2009 Fernando Chui announced his election campaign, under the slogan of "people-oriented, preservation and innovation, building harmony" revealed on 25 May, focusing on focused on four main issues: handling post-2008 financial crisis economy, improving living quality, advocating diversified economy, and reforming governance.

Chui resigned Secretary for Social Affairs and Culture on 13 May and accepted by the Chinese Government a day later. The Chief Executive succeeded as the acting Secretary. Chui submitted his 286 nominations on 16 June, and became the sole candidate of this election.

== Candidates ==
=== Nominees ===
- Fernando Chui Sai-on, former Secretary for Social Affairs and Culture

=== Expressed interest ===
Four individuals publicly expressed interest for running in the election, namely Li Guangyuan, Wu Ruiyuan, Lü Ziyu, and Liu Shunlian. None reached the 50 nominations threshold as Chui secured 286 nominations amongst 300 Election Committee members.

=== Declined ===
- Ho Chio-meng, Procurator General
- Ho Iat-seng, member of the Standing Committee of the National People's Congress, member of the Executive Council

== Results ==
On 26 July 2009, Fernando Chui Sai-on was elected with 95% of electoral votes. Despite being nominated by 286 members, Chui only won 282 votes after 14 voted abstention and 4 did not vote, including pro-democracy José Pereira Coutinho despite his attendance in the poll station.

The election result was ratified on 28 July 2009 by the Court of Final Appeal.

Candidate	Party	Votes	%
Fernando Chui	Independent	282	100.00
Total		282	100.00
Valid votes		282	95.27
Invalid votes		0	0.00
Blank votes		14	4.73
Total votes		296	100.00
Registered voters/turnout		300	98.67
Source: Electoral Affairs Commission

== Criticism ==
Criticisms surrounding Chui and the election tangled throughout the whole campaign, including collision between government and businessmen.

=== Undemocratic election ===
Pro-democracy legislator Antonio Ng sarcastically praised the election for being perfect in "small-circle", referring to the limited electorates. He said if Ho Chio-meng ran in the election, it could in fact bring illusions of public opinion having a say in elections.

Pro-democracy camp continued their objection towards the stalling of democratisation, called for universal suffrage of Chief Executive elections. New Macau Association, who held two seats in Election Committee as ex-officio members, stated they would not vote in the election in protest to the unfair selection of the committee.

Some also claimed the contact information of Election Committee members were not publicised, causing unjustness to those who were interested in joining the race.

=== Media-related ===
Apple Daily from Hong Kong reported that electorates took photos in front of polling station, while some being suspected of leaking voting intention before submitting their votes. The newspaper described the whole election process as "lax".

Ming Pao and Hong Kong Economic Journal received letters from Macau with blades attached, objecting to businessman holding the top office of Macau.

=== Abstention votes ===
Billionaire Stanley Ho criticised those casting empty ballots as "making a very wrong mistake". Pro-Beijing newspaper Journal San Wa Ou editor-in-chief 林昶 condemned Coutinho with the idiom "being a whore while trying to secure virginity" for publicly boycotting the election.
