= Secretary for Transport and Public Works (Portuguese Macau) =

The Secretary for Transport and Public Works (Portuguese: Secretário-Adjunto dos Transportes e Obras Públicas) was a bureau secretary in Portuguese Macau until the handover of Macau in 1999. The Secretary headed the Secretariat for Transport and Public Works (Secretaria dos Transportes e Obras Públicas).

The role for Communications from the old Secretary for Public Works and Communications was transferred to the Secretary for Tourism and Culture.

List of responsibilities:

== List of departments ==
- Cartography and Cadastre Bureau
- Port Authority
- Macau Post - created from the old Posts, Telegraphs and Telephones
- Meteorological and Geophysical Bureau
- Housing
- Environmental Protection Committee
- Civil Aviation Authority
- Infrastructure Development Office
- Energy Sector Development Office
- Bureau of Telecommunications Regulation - created from the old Posts, Telegraphs and Telephones
- Land, Public works and Transport Bureau (Macau)
- Maritime Administration

== List of Secretariats ==
- Alves Paula

== Deputy Secretaries ==
- Vasco Joaquim Rocha Vieira 1974-1975 (Public Works and Communications); last Governor 1991–1999

== See also ==
- Transport in Macau
