= Centre for Disease Control and Prevention (Macau) =

- 疾病預防控制中心; Centro de Controlo e Prevenção da Doença

Agency overview
- Formed: 2001
- Superseding agency: none
- Jurisdiction: Macau
- Headquarters: Macau
- Ministers responsible: Secretary for Social Affairs and Budget; Lei Chin Ion, Director of the Health Bureau
- Agency executive: Mr Tong Ka-io, Director
- Parent agency: Health Bureau

The Centre for Disease Control and Prevention (Chinese: 疾病預防控制中心, Portuguese: Centro de Controlo e Prevenção da Doença) was created in 2001 and is under the Health Bureau of Secretariat for Social Affairs and Culture of Macau, China.

== History ==
In the wake of the COVID-19 pandemic in Macau, the CPDCP's Communicable Disease Prevention and Disease Surveillance Unit is tasked to monitor residents of Macau and anyone else who travels in and out of the SAR as part of anti-coronavirus measures enacted.

== Structure ==
The CDCP is in of the following units:

- Communicable Disease Prevention and Disease Surveillance Unit
- Special Preventive Services Team
- Chronic Disease Prevention and Health Promotion Unit
- Environmental & Food Hygiene Unit
- Health Planning Unit
- Vector Control Working Group
- Community Health Working Group

== See also ==
- Similar agencies
  - Centre for Health Protection, Hong Kong
  - Chinese Center for Disease Control and Prevention
  - European Centre for Disease Prevention and Control (ECDC) European Union
  - Centres for Disease Control (CDC) United States
  - Health Protection Agency (HPA) United Kingdom
  - Institut de veille sanitaire (IVS) France
  - Public Health Agency of Canada (PHAC) Canada
- Public health
