= Yuet Wah College =

Coordinates: 22.19709°N 113.54825°E

- 粵華中學; Colégio Yuet Wah
- School Badge of Yuet Wah College

Location
- 18, Estrada da Vitoria; Estrada da Vitória, Macau; Macau

Information
- School type: Grant-in-aid, Secondary school
- Motto: Latin: "IN VIRTUTE SCIENTIA"; Chinese: 德修學講
- Religious affiliation: Roman Catholic
- Established: 1925
- Status: Open
- Supervisor: Fr. Martin Yip Tai-ho (葉泰浩神父)
- Principal: Fr. Joseph Chow Pak Fai (周伯輝神父)
- Grades: F.1 - F.6 (Equivalent of Grades 7–12)
- Gender: Male Only
- Enrollment: 1692
- Education system: English Section: IGCSE;IAL; Chinese Section: "Curriculum Framework" and "The Requirements of Basic Academic Attainments"
- Language: Chinese, English
- Affiliation: Salesians of Don Bosco
- Website: http://www.yuetwah.edu.mo

Yuet Wah College

Chinese name
- Traditional Chinese: 粵華中學
- Simplified Chinese: 粤华中学
Transcriptions
Standard Mandarin
- Hanyu Pinyin: Yuè Huá Zhōngxué
Yue: Cantonese
- Jyutping: jyut6 waa4 zung1 hok6

Portuguese name
- Portuguese: Colégio Yuet Wah

Yuet Wah College (Portuguese: Colégio Yuet Wah; Chinese: 粵華中學; abbr: YWC), often referred to as Yuet Wah, is a Macau all-boys Catholic secondary school in São Lázaro (St. Lazarus Parish), Macau. It was founded in 1925, making it one of the oldest secondary schools in Macau. It is accredited by the Salesians of Don Bosco.

The school aims to provide a liberal education based on Catholic principles; its students are encouraged to be well-rounded. School teams participate in various inter-school sports and music competitions. Since 2001, it has become a through-train school with Colégio do Perpétuo Socorro Chan Sui Ki (suc.) and Colégio Dom Bosco (Yuet Wah).

== History ==
Yuet Wah College was founded by Liu Fung Kei in 1925 in Canton, China. Due to instability in Canton, Yuet Wah College moved its campus to Macau in 1928. Starting from 1941, Yuet Wah College has offered a full high school curriculum after the first batch of students graduated. After the outbreak of the Pacific War in 1942, the school was transferred to the Salesians of Don Bosco, under the arrangements of Fr. Mario Aquistapace.

== Curriculum ==
Yuet Wah College prepare students for the JAEM Examination and International A-levels as well as IGCSE.

== Facilities ==
- Jubilee Complex

- Covered Playground
- Gym Room
- Taekwondo Room
- Hall
- Jubilee Staff Room
- Toilets

- Dominic Building

- Classrooms
- Priest's Dormitory
- School Office
- General Office
- Principal's Room
- Admission Counseling Room
- Library
- Stationery Shop
- Religious Activity Room
- Salesian Youth Room
- Small Chapel
- School Supervisor's Room
- Meeting Room
- Dominic Canteen
- Dominic Music Room
- Dominic Art Room
- Toilets
- Communication Office

- Rinaldi Building

- Small Hall
- Classrooms
- Rinaldi Music Room
- Rinaldi Art Room
- Electric Laboratory
- Toilets

- Versiglia Building

- Computer Rooms
- Physical Laboratory
- Chemical Laboratory
- Social Worker's Room
- First Aids' Room
- Student Union's Room
- PE Room
- Toilets

- Bosco Building

- Chapel
- Bosco Staff Room
- Rinaldi Canteen
- Orchestra's Room
- Meeting Room
- Toilets
- Table Tennis Room

- School History Museum
- Dominic Basketball Court
- Versiglia Basketball Court
- Football Field
- Mary's Pavilion
- Titan Track

== Notable alumni and staff ==
Yuet Wah College has a number of notable alumni, including entrepreneurs, politicians, civil servants, musicians, actors, three members of the Macau Executive Council and three secretaries.

- António Ng Kuok Cheong (member in the Macau Legislative Assembly)
- Cheong Kuoc Vá (first Secretary for Security of Macau)
- Lau Si Io (second Secretariat for Transport and Public Works of Macau)
- Kuan Hsin-chi (chairman of the Hong Kong Civic Party)
- Chan Wai Chi (chairman of the New Democratic Macau Association)
- Ao Man-long (first Secretary for Transport and Public Works of Macau)
- Alex Fong Chung-Sun (famous actor from Hong Kong)
- Julio Acconci (member of the HK-based band Soler)
- Dino Acconci (member of the HK-based band Soler)
- Steven Lo Kit-Sing (businessman active in Hong Kong and Macau entertainment. Current chairman of the BMA Investment.)

== See also ==
- Chan Sui Ki Perpetual Help College
