= Florinda Chan =

Macanese politician (born 1954)

Florinda da Rosa Silva Chan Chan Lai Man OMP
- 陳麗敏

Secretary for Administration and Justice
- In office 20 December 1999 – 20 December 2014
- Chief Executive: Edmund Ho; Fernando Chui
- Preceded by: Jorge Rangel (Secretary for Public Administration, Education, Youth and Justice)
- Succeeded by: Sonia Chan

Personal details
- Born: June 1954 (age 72) Portuguese Macau
- Education: International Open University of Asia; Beijing Languages and Cultural University
- Occupation: civil servant
- Profession: business administration

Florinda Chan
- Traditional Chinese: 陳麗敏
- Simplified Chinese: 陈丽敏
Transcriptions
Standard Mandarin
- Hanyu Pinyin: Chén Límǐn
Yue: Cantonese
- Jyutping: can4 lai6 man5

Florinda da Rosa Silva Chan (陳麗敏) (born June 1954) is a Macanese politician. She was the first Secretary for Administration and Justice in Macau.

Chan was born in Macau in June 1954. She was educated in Macau holding a master's degree in Business Administration. In July 1993, she attended a one-year programme in Chinese Language and Public Administration in Beijing. She is fluent in various languages including Chinese, Portuguese, English and Italian.

She has been with the Macau civil service since 1983 having served in various positions:

- Division Chief, Division of Textile Negotiations 1983–1985
- Macau Liaison Office in Brussels
- Division Chief, Division of Quotas Control 1987–1995
- Deputy Director of Economic Services Department 1995–1998
- Director of Economic Services Department 1998–1999
- Secretary-general of the Economic Committee 1993
- Secretary to the Presidium of the Center for the Transfer of Productivity and Science and Technology 1998–1999
- member of the Standing Committee of the Consultative Committee for the Basic Law of MSAR
- Vice-chairman of the Economic Committee of the Macau Government
- Chairman of the General Committee of the Center for the Transfer of Productivity and Science and Technology
- Council member of the Association of the Basic Law of MSAR

Preceded by Jorge Alberto Hagedorn Rangel as Secretary for Public Administration, Education and Youth of Macau & Secretary for Justice of Macau	Secretary for Administration and Justice of Macau; 1999–2014	Succeeded by Sónia Chan Hoi Fan
