= Ho Sut Heng =

Macanese trade unionist and politician

Ho Sut Heng (born 1960) is a Macau politician and trade union leader. She is the president of the Macau Federation of Trade Unions, Macau's largest body of trade unions, has served two terms on Macau's Executive Council, and is one of Macau's twelve representatives in the Chinese national legislature. She is a recipient of the Silver Lotus Medal of Honour from the Macau government.

== Biography ==
Ho Sut Heng was born in 1960 in Macau.

== Career ==
Ho Sut Heng is the current president of the Macau Federation of Trade Unions, Macau's largest trade union body, after serving as its vice-president for several years. The Federation represents 43 branch unions and over 50,000 members. In her capacity as the president, she also served on Macau's Executive Council for two terms while Fernando Chui was the Chief Executive. She is also one of the twelve people representing Macau on the National People's Congress, China's national legislature, since 2017, serving two terms. Within Macau, she also serves on the University Council of the Macau University of Science and Technology. In November 2019, she was the recipient of the Macau government's Silver Lotus Medal of Honour. In 2020, she received an honorary doctorate from the Macau University of Science and Technology. In 2020, Macau Business listed her as one of Macau's twenty most influential women.

In 2013, Ho publicly opposed the demolition of an 80 year old Portuguese pillbox, calling for a balance between economic development and the preservation of Macau's cultural heritage.
