= Ho Chio Meng =

Macanese legal prosecutor

- 何超明

Procurator General of Macau
- In office 1999–2014
- Preceded by: António Simões Redinha as Attorney General of Macau
- Succeeded by: Ip Son Sang

Personal details
- Born: 1955 (age 70–71) Macau
- Education: Southwest China University of Political Science and Law, Law College of Beijing University, University of Coimbra, University of Macau
- Occupation: prosecutor
- Profession: lawyer

Ho Chio Meng (born in 1955) was the first prosecutor general of the Public Prosecutions Office of the Macau Special Administrative Region of the People's Republic of China. Having been appointed in 1999 and re-appointed in 2004 and 2009, he served until 20 December 2014, when he was replaced by Ip Son Sang, a judge.

Ho was also the president of the Macau Public Prosecutors Commission, president of the Macau Justice and Prosecution Society, and honorary president of the Macau Juridical and Economic Authority.

== Biography ==
Ho's ancestors moved to Macau from Panyu, Guangdong Province, in 1824, and he belongs to the fifth generation of his family to have lived in the enclave. He was born in Macau, and, as a child, he moved with his family to mainland China in 1966, where he remained for the next three decades.

From 1972 to 1979, Ho worked for the Guangzhou Bureau for Foreign Trade, where he was involved in the areas of trade (import and export of foodstuffs) and administration.

=== Legal career ===
Ho studied law at Southwest University of Political Science & Law from 1979 to 1983, and received a PhD and a bachelor's degree in law.

Ho served in Guangdong Provincial People's High Court from 1987 to 1990 as Assistant Judge, Judge, and Chief of Court.

After returning to Macau in 1990, Ho went to the University of Coimbra in Portugal, to further his study of the Portuguese language and law. Upon his return to Macau, he obtained a bachelor's degree in law from the University of Macau.

In 1998, Ho took the Training Course for Senior Public Servants of Macau at the National Administration Institute of China, and he completed a doctoral course in economic law at the Law College of Beijing University in 2002.

=== Macau civil servant ===
In Macau, Ho took up the post of Coordinator of the High Commissioner's Office Against Corruption of Administrative Illegality in 1993, became Deputy High Commissioner in 1995, and he served, as required, as Acting High Commissioner.

Ho also became a magistrate in Macau. Ho was appointed the first prosecutor general of the Public Prosecutions Office of Macau in 1999, and served until 20 December 2014. His appointment raised concerns and suspicions that Ho's legal training in and deep connection with China may limit his understanding of the legal codes and imperil his impartiality.

=== Arrest and conviction ===
Ho was arrested on 26 February 2016 as he was boarding a ferry to Hong Kong, and was charged with 1,536 counts of a criminal nature–the largest number of charges in Macau's history. Alleged crimes included initiating or founding a criminal syndicate, forgery, fraud and money laundering.

Ho allegedly conspired to award and personally benefit from some 2,000 public contracts worth more than 167 million patacas (US$20 million) between 2004 and 2014. Ho and nine co-defendants were estimated to have pocketing at least 44 million patacas (US$5.3 million). Ho is said to have conspired with relatives to set up 10 shell companies, which were then used to obtain outsourcing contracts from the prosecutor's office.

During the trial, his driver Mak Hak Neng admitted in court to having transported bags of cash–from 100 to 300,000 patacas each time–on Ho's behalf and deposited in an individual bank account in Zhuhai under Ho's name.

Ho was found guilty of the city's top court, and sentenced to 21 years' imprisonment on 14 July 2017 with no right to appeal. He has been ordered to pay more than 18 million patacas to the prosecutor general's office of which he was once head. Separately, he and co-defendants have to pay more than 50 million patacas to the office that had been defrauded.

== See also ==
- Ao Man Long
- Commission Against Corruption (Macau)
- Corruption in China

Preceded by Antonio Simoes Redinha as Attorney General of Macau	Procurator General of Macau; 1999– 2014	Succeeded by Ip Son Sang
