= AACM =

AACM may refer to:

- Ali Akbar College of Music, three schools founded by Indian musician Ali Akbar Khan to teach Indian classical music
- Ardennes American Cemetery and Memorial, a cemetery for American World War II dead on foreign soil
- Association for the Advancement of Creative Musicians, a non-profit organization of musicians
- Civil Aviation Authority of Macau (Autoridade de Aviação Civil da Região Administrativa Especial de Macau)
