= Hoi Lai Fong =

Macau politician

Chief of the Office of the Chief Executive
- Incumbent
- Assumed office 20 December 2019
- Chief Executive: Ho Iat Seng

Deputy Commissioner of Commission Against Corruption
- In office December 2014 – 19 December 2019
- Succeeded by: Chan In Chio

Personal details
- Born: 1974 (age 51–52) Fujian Province, China
- Education: Sun Yat-sen University

Hoi Lai Fong (Chinese: 許麗芳) is a Macau politician and the current chief of the Office of the Chief Executive. Hoi previously served as the deputy commissioner of the Commission Against Corruption, and the head of the Macau Economic Bureau Legal Production Department.

She was born in Fujian in 1974 and studied law at Sun Yat-sen University.
