= Cheong Weng Chon =

Secretariat for Administration and Justice in Macau

André Cheong Weng Chon
- 張永春

President of the Legislative Assembly of Macau
- Incumbent
- Assumed office 16 October 2025
- Preceded by: Kou Hoi In

Member of the Legislative Assembly of Macau
- Incumbent
- Assumed office 15 October 2025
- Appointed by: Sam Hou Fai
- Preceded by: Kou Hoi In

Secretary for Administration and Justice
- In office 19 December 2019 – 16 October 2025
- Chief Executive: Ho Iat-seng
- Preceded by: Sonia Chan
- Succeeded by: Wong Sio Chak

Commissioner Against Corruption of Macau
- In office December 2014 – December 2019
- Chief Executive: Fernando Chui
- Preceded by: Vasco Fong Man Chong
- Succeeded by: Chan Tsz King

Personal details
- Born: Zhang Yongchun; September 1966 (age 59–60) Beijing, China
- Party: Non-partisan
- Education: Beijing Foreign Studies University, University of Macau
- Occupation: Civil Servant

Cheong Weng Chon
- Traditional Chinese: 張永春
- Simplified Chinese: 张永春
Transcriptions
Standard Mandarin
- Hanyu Pinyin: Zhāng Yǒngchūn
- IPA: [ʈʂáŋ jʊ̀ŋ.ʈʂʰwə́n]
Yue: Cantonese
- Jyutping: Zoeng^{1} Wing^{5} Ceon^{1}
- IPA: [tsœŋ˥ wɪŋ˩˧ tsʰɵn˥]

André Cheong Weng Chon ([ɐ̃ˈdɾɛ ˈtʃɛɲ]; Chinese: 張永春; born September 1966) is current President of the Legislative Assembly of Macau since 2025 and former Secretary for Administration and Justice of Macau from 2019 to 2025.

== Early life and education ==
Cheong Weng Chon was born in Beijing in 1966 and later moved to Macau. He received a Bachelor of Arts in the Portuguese language from Beijing Foreign Studies University and a law degree from the University of Macau.

== Career ==
Cheong worked in Macau as an assistant to the Registrar and the Notary Public, as Registrar of the Real Estate Registry and as Director of the Judicial Affairs Bureau. He later served as Director of the Legal Affairs Bureau from November 2000 to December 2014. He held the post of Commissioner Against Corruption from December 2014 to December 2019.

Cheong served as President of the Legal Aid Commission, a member of the Public Administration Reform Consultation Committee and a member of the Law Reform Consultative Committee. In 2019 he was appointed Secretary for Administration and Justice in Macau, becoming the first male to hold the position. He was appointed as a member of the Legislative Assembly of Macau in 15 October 2025 and was unanimously elected as the legislature’s president the next day.

Preceded by Sónia Chan Hoi Fan	Secretary for Administration and Justice of Macau; 2019–2025	Succeeded by Wong Sio Chak
