= Procurator General of Macau =

The Procurator General of Macau (Chinese: 檢察長; Portuguese: Gabinete do Procurador) is the senior law officer of Macau. The PG replaced the Attorney General of Macau in December 1999 in the new Government of Macau. The PG reports to the Secretariat for Administration and Justice. The current PG is Ip Son Sang, who was appointed on 20 December 2014.

== Organization ==
With the exception of the title change from Attorney General to Prosecutor-General, the other office holders are the same as before the handover in 1999. The office is similar to most legal structures in Europe and North America.

List of Procurator General of Macau

No.	Name	Assumed office	Left office
1	Ho Chio Meng 何超明	20 December 1999	20 December 2014
2	Ip Son Sang 葉迅生	20 December 2014	Incumbent

=== Public Prosecutor ===
Department of Public Prosecution (Ministerio Publico) is the office charged with supervising the enforcement of laws of Macau.

The DPP consists of

- Assistant Prosecutor-General (Procurador-Geral Adjunto)
  - Vong Vai Va PhD(Law) – Part-time assistant professor of law at the University of Macau
- 4 Chief Prosecutors (Procuradores)
- 24 Prosecutors (Delegados do Procurador)

== See also ==
- Legal system of Macau
