= Land and Urban Construction Bureau =

- 土地工務局; Direcção dos Serviços de Solos e Construção Urbana

Bureau overview
- Formed: 2022
- Preceding agencies: Public Works Bureau (1867); Public Works and Transport Bureau (1964); Land, Public Works and Transport Bureau (1990)
- Jurisdiction: Government of Macau
- Headquarters: Estrada de D. Maria II, N° 33, Macau
- Bureau executive: Director of Land and Urban Construction Bureau
- Parent Bureau: Secretariat for Transport and Public Works (Macau)
- Website: http://www.dsscu.gov.mo/

The Land and Urban Construction Bureau (DSSCU; Chinese: 土地工務局; Portuguese: Direcção dos Serviços de Solos e Construção Urbana) is a department under the Secretariat for Transport and Public Works of Macau, China.

It is responsible for government policy and regulation over transport, land use, and public works and infrastructure in Macau.

== Departments ==
- Urbanization
  - Licensing Division
  - Inspection Division
- Urban Planning
- Public Construction
  - Project and Construction Works
  - Maintenance and Repair Division
- Land Management
- Infrastructure
  - Hydraulics and Sanitation Division
  - Geotechnics and Roads Division

== See also ==
- Government of Macau
