= Sonia Chan =

Chinese government official

Sónia Chan Chan Hoi Fan
- 陳海帆
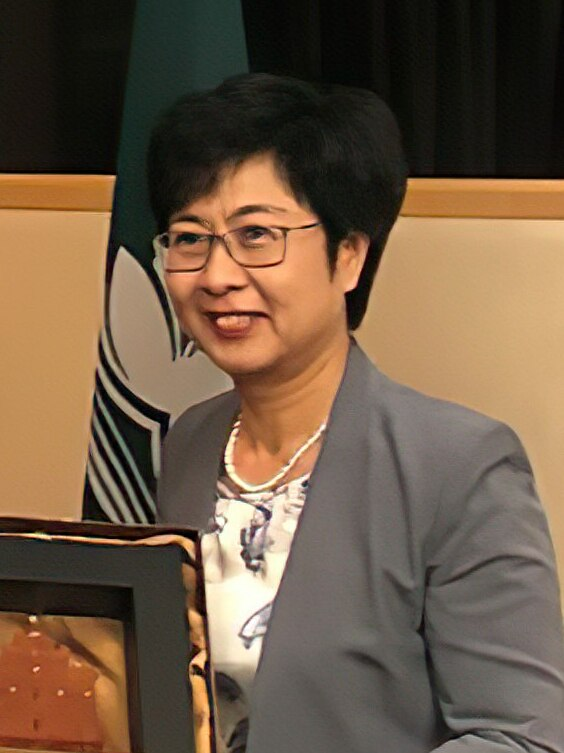

Secretary for Administration and Justice
- In office 20 December 2014 – 19 December 2019
- Chief Executive: Fernando Chui
- Preceded by: Florinda Chan
- Succeeded by: Cheong Weng Chon

Personal details
- Born: December 1964 (age 61) Guangzhou, Guangdong
- Education: Sun Yat-sen University; Renmin University of China
- Occupation: civil servant
- Profession: criminal law enforcer

Sonia Chan
- Traditional Chinese: 陳海帆
- Simplified Chinese: 陈海帆
Transcriptions
Standard Mandarin
- Hanyu Pinyin: Chén Hǎifān
Yue: Cantonese
- Jyutping: can4 hoi2 faan4

Sónia Chan Hoi Fan (Chinese: 陳海帆; born December 1964) was the Secretary for Administration and Justice from 2014 to 2019, the second most senior government official in Macau.

Chan was born in Guangzhou, Guangdong province, in December 1964. She received a bachelor's degree in law from Sun Yat-sen University. In 2000, she attended Renmin University of China in Beijing and earned a master's degree in criminal law. Chan was the chairperson of the Female Civil Servants Association from 1999 to 2010 and the director of the Alumni Association of Macao Academy Education Fund Society since 1992.

She has been with the Macau civil service since 1994 having served in various positions:

- Head of the Division of Criminal Record under the Identification Services Bureau (DSI), 1994–1998
- Deputy Director of the Identification Services Bureau (DSI), 1998–2010
- Coordinator of the Office for Personal Data Protection, 2007–2014

Preceded by Florinda da Rosa Silva Chan	Secretary for Administration and Justice of Macau; 2014–2019	Succeeded by Cheong Weng Chon
