= Secretary for Public Administration, Education and Youth =

The Secretary for Public Administration, Education and Youth was a bureau secretary in the Portuguese administration in Macau. The Secretary headed the Secretariat for Public Administration, Education and Youth, which was responsible for the civil service, education and youth affairs in the colony. The department's civil service section was reassigned to the Secretariat for Administration and Justice, while the youth and education affairs section was given to the Secretariat for Social Affairs and Culture following the handover.

== List of responsibilities ==
- Civil Service
- Education and Youth Affairs Bureau
- Macau Sports Development Board
- Tertiary Education Services Office
- University of Macau
- Macau Polytechnic Institute

== List of Secretariats ==
- Dr. Jorge Alberto Hagedorn Rangel - Secretary
- Ho Ven On - Assistant Secretary
