= Government Information Bureau =

- 新聞局; Gabinete de Comunicação Social (Portuguese)

Agency overview
- Formed: 1981; 45 years ago
- Superseding agency: Office of Chief Executive of Macau
- Jurisdiction: Macau
- Headquarters: Avenida da Praia Grande, n.os 762-804, Edifício China Plaza, 15.º andar, Macau
- Agency executive: Inês Wong Lok I, Director
- Website: www.gcs.gov.mo/news/home/en

The Government Information Bureau (Chinese: 新聞局; Portuguese: Gabinete de Comunicação Social), commonly known as MacaoGCS, is the agency responsible for coordinating and studying the social transmission of government of the Macao Special Administrative Region of the People's Republic of China. The departments that broadcast and provide assistance to the administrative authorities in this field are directly under the jurisdiction of the chief executive.
