= Alexis Tam =

Macau civil servant

Alexis Tam Tam Chon Weng
- 譚俊榮

Secretary for Social Affairs and Culture of Macau
- In office 20 December 2014 – 19 December 2019
- Preceded by: Cheong U

Personal details
- Born: July 1962 (age 64) Myanmar
- Education: National Chengchi University; China University of Political Science and Law; University of Glasgow; Nankai University; Lisbon University Institute; Catholic University of Portugal
- Occupation: Civil servant

Alexis Tam Chon Weng
- Traditional Chinese: 譚俊榮
- Simplified Chinese: 谭俊荣
Transcriptions
Standard Mandarin
- Hanyu Pinyin: Tán Jùnróng
Yue: Cantonese
- Jyutping: taam4 zeon3 wing4

Alexis Tam Chon Weng (Chinese: 譚俊榮; born July 1962) is a retired Macau civil servant.

Tam spent 33 years in the civil service of Macau. He previously served as Secretary for Social Affairs and Culture of Macau, the fifth most senior government official in Macau, from 2014 until 2019. He retired in December 2022.

== Early life and education ==
Tam was born in Myanmar in July 1962. He received a bachelor's degree in business administration from National Chengchi University and a bachelor's degree in law from China University of Political Science and Law. He also earned a master's degree in international business and entrepreneurship from the University of Glasgow along with a PhD in business administration from Nankai University. Tam also has two higher education degrees in Portuguese language and culture from the Lisbon University Institute and human resource management and strategic management from the Catholic University of Portugal.

== Career ==
Tam was the Chief of Office of the Chief Executive Fernando Chui's Office during December 2009 to December 2014.

In 2023, Tam's retirement in December 2022 was announced.

| Preceded by Cheong U | Secretary for Social Affairs and Culture of Macau; 2014–2019 | Succeeded by Elsie Ao Ieong |
