= Fátima Choi =

Fátima Choi Choi Mei Lei
- 蔡美莉

Commissioner of Audit of Macau
- In office 20 December 1999 – 19 December 2009
- Preceded by: post established
- Succeeded by: Ho Veng On

Personal details
- Born: 1958 (age 67–68) Macau
- Education: University of Essex, Hong Kong Polytechnic University and Chinese University of Hong Kong
- Occupation: civil servant
- Profession: auditor, statistician, researcher

Fátima Choi Mei Lei (born 1958) MSc, BSc, was a Commissioner of Audit in Macau.

Born in Macau, Choi obtained a Master of Science degree in statistics and Bachelor of Science degree in mathematics from the University of Essex.

She was an assistant researcher in Hong Kong Polytechnic University and Chinese University of Hong Kong from 1985 to 1986. She joined the statistics and census department of the Macau government. Choi held other positions in the local government:

- Senior Technician
- Department Chief of Social Affairs and Accountants 1991–1995
- Deputy Director 1995–1997
- Director 1997–1999

Choi was the first Chinese official at the director's level after localization in Macau before it was transferred from Portuguese to Chinese rule.

Preceded by new position	Commissioner of Audit of Macau; 1999–2009	Succeeded by Ho Veng On
