= Cheong U =

- 張裕

Secretary for Social Affairs and Culture
- In office 20 December 2009 – 20 December 2014
- Chief Executive: Fernando Chui
- Preceded by: Fernando Chui
- Succeeded by: Alexis Tam

Head of the Commission Against Corruption
- In office 20 December 1999 – 20 December 2009
- Chief Executive: Edmund Ho
- Preceded by: Luís Mendonça Freitas (as High Commissioner Against Corruption and Administrative Illegality)
- Succeeded by: Vasco Fong

Personal details
- Born: 1957 (age 68–69) China
- Education: University of Macau; Zhongshan University
- Profession: Auditor

Cheong U (traditional Chinese: 張裕; simplified Chinese: 张裕; pinyin: Zhāng Yù; born 1957) is the Secretary for Social Affairs and Culture. Previously he served as the head of Commission Against Corruption.

Born in China, Cheong went to Hou Kong Secondary School and obtained his bachelor's degree in public administration at the University of Macau's National Institute of Public Administration of Portugal and a Master of Public Administration from Zhongshan University in Guangzhou.

Cheong was a member of the Second Municipal Council of Macau and held other political titles:

- Director of public health and environment of the Municipal Islands Council
- appointed member of the Municipal Islands Assembly
- Vice-chairman of the Executive Committee of the Municipal Islands Council
- member of the Municipal Islands Assembly
- Deputy Secretary-general of the Macau Association of Public Administration

Prior to the handover Cheong served in China related positions:

- Member of the Selection Committee for the first government of MSAR

Preceded by Luís Mendonça Freitas as High Commissioner Against Corruption and Administrative Illegality	Head of the Commission Against Corruption; 1999–2009	Succeeded by Vasco Fong
Preceded by Fernando Chui	Secretary for Social Affairs and Culture; 2009–2014	Succeeded by Alexis Tam
