= Raimundo Arrais do Rosário =

Engenheiro Raimundo Arrais do Rosário Lo Lap Man
- 羅立文

Secretary for Transport and Public Works
- In office 20 December 2014 – 20 December 2024
- Preceded by: Lau Si Io
- Succeeded by: Tam Vai Man

Personal details
- Born: August 1956 (age 70) Portuguese Macau
- Education: University of Porto, Universidade Nova de Lisboa
- Occupation: Civil servant
- Profession: Civil engineer

Raimundo Arrais do Rosário
- Traditional Chinese: 羅立文
- Simplified Chinese: 罗立文
Transcriptions
Standard Mandarin
- Hanyu Pinyin: Luó Lìwén
Yue: Cantonese
- Jyutping: lo4 lap6 man4

Raimundo Arrais do Rosário (Chinese: 羅立文; born August 1956), is a civil servant, ex-legislator (1992–1999) and was the Secretariat for Transport and Public Works (2014–2024 ) of the Macau Special Administrative Region of China.

Rosário, a Macanese of Portuguese ancestry, was born in Macau, then under Portuguese administration, in August 1956. He received a bachelor's degree in civil engineering from University of Porto and completed a postgraduate programme in soil mechanics from Universidade Nova de Lisboa. Rosário became a civil servant in 1979 until 1990, having served in various positions:

- Technician of the Secretariat for Transport and Public Works
- Department Head of the Secretariat for Transport and Public Works
- Deputy Secretary of the Secretariat for Transport and Public Works
- Chairman of the Land Committee and Traffic Committee.

From 1990 to 1999 he became a freelance civil engineer. Between 1992 and 1999, he was a member of the Legislative Assembly of Macau, being appointed by the Governor of Macau. He was also a member of the Drafting Committee of the Basic Law of Macau, a member of the Preparatory Committee of the Macau Special Administrative Region, and a member of the Portuguese delegation of the Sino-Portuguese Land Group.

After the transfer of Macau to China (1999), and until 2014, Rosário was director of the Macau Economic and Trade Office in Lisbon, director of the Macau Economic and Trade Office to the European Union in Brussels, and director of the Macau Economic and Trade Office to the World Trade Organization in Geneva.

After returning to Macau in 2014, he was the Secretary for Transport and Public Works of Macau for ten years, until 2024.

== See also ==
- List of members of the Legislative Assembly of Macau

Preceded by Lau Si Io	Secretary for Transport and Public Works; 2014–2024	Succeeded by Tam Vai Man
