= CTT (Macau) =

Postal service and telecommunications regulator

Macau Post and Telecommunications (CTT) 澳門郵電局 Correios e Telecomunicações de Macau
- Type: Public agency
- Industry: Post, Philately, Telecommunications
- Founded: 1884
- Founder: CTT
- Headquarters: Edifício-Sede dos Correios de Macau, Largo do Senado, Macau Peninsula, Macau, China; 22°11′35.9″N 113°32′24.7″E, Macau, China
- Area served: Macau
- Key people: Derby Lau Wai-Meng (Director)
- Services: Postal services, Philatelic services, Telecommunications
- Owner: Government of Macao
- Website: ctt.gov.mo

Correios de Macau
- Traditional Chinese: 澳門郵政
- Simplified Chinese: 澳门邮政
- Literal meaning: Macau Post
Transcriptions
Standard Mandarin
- Hanyu Pinyin: Àomén Yóuzhèng
Yue: Cantonese
- Jyutping: Ou3 Mun4 Jau4 Zing3

Logo of Macau Post

Macau Post and Telecommunications, (Note: Portuguese: Correios e Telecomunicações de Macau; Chinese: 澳門郵電局) most commonly known as CTT, is an entity under the Government of Macao responsible for postal services and telecommunications regulation.

The acronym CTT comes from the former name of the Portuguese postal administration (Portuguese: Correios, Telégrafos e Telefones, lit. 'Post, Telegraph and Telephone') during the colonial period of Macao.

== Postal history ==
The Macao Post was founded on 1, March 1884 (separate from Correio Público—Public Post Office of Portugal), as a separate entity from China Post and a sub-member of the Universal Postal Union. Prior to the handover of Macau from Portugal to China in 1999, Macau postage stamps bore the Portuguese words REPÚBLICA PORTUGUESA (i.e., the 'Portuguese Republic'), but now bear the Portuguese words MACAU, CHINA.

=== Organization ===
The Postal service is headed by a Director with two sub-directors.

=== Services ===
- Postal Services (1884-now)
- Postal Savings (1917-now)
- Operator of Telecommunication Services (1927–1981)
- Regulator of Telecommunication Services and Radio Spectrum Management (1982–2000)
- Radio Broadcasting Services (1933–1973)
- Supervision of the Electric Industries Services (1928–1985)
- eSignTrust - Digital Certificate Services (2006-now)
- Communications Museum (2006-now)
- Secure Electronic Postal Services (SEPS) (2008-now)
- Telecommunications Regulator (2017-now)

== Postal Stations ==
Postal Stations are referred to as Branches with fifteen spread across Macao:

- Central
- Rua do Campo
- Red Market (Almirante Lacerda)
- Mong Ha
- Hac Sa Wan (Areia Preta)
- Cultural Centre
- Terminal Tradic
- Loja do Museu
- Airport
- Nova Taipa
- Ocean Garden
- Carmo (The former Taipa Post Office)
- Coloane
- Seac Pai Van
- Fai Chi Kei
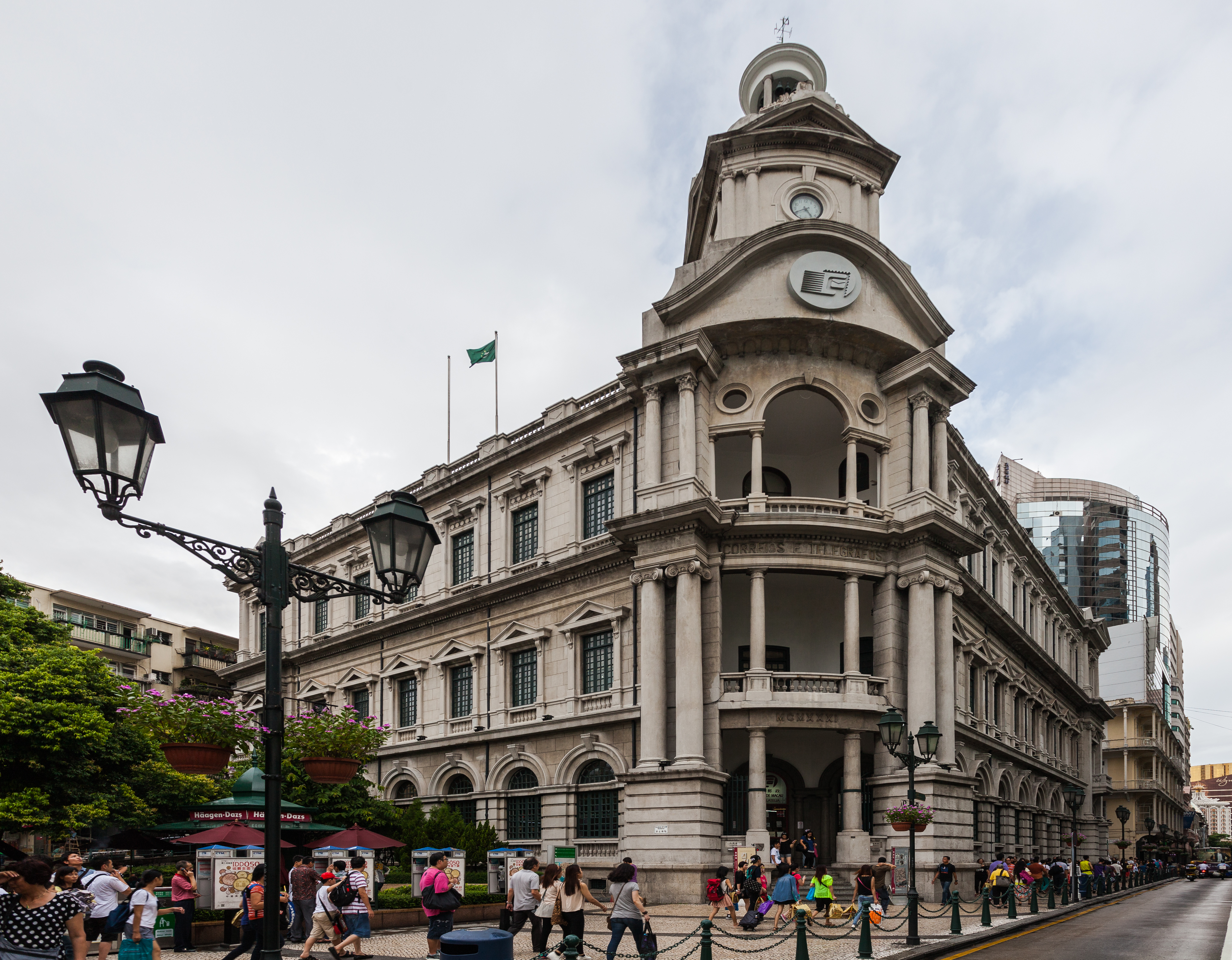
Headquarters of Macao Post

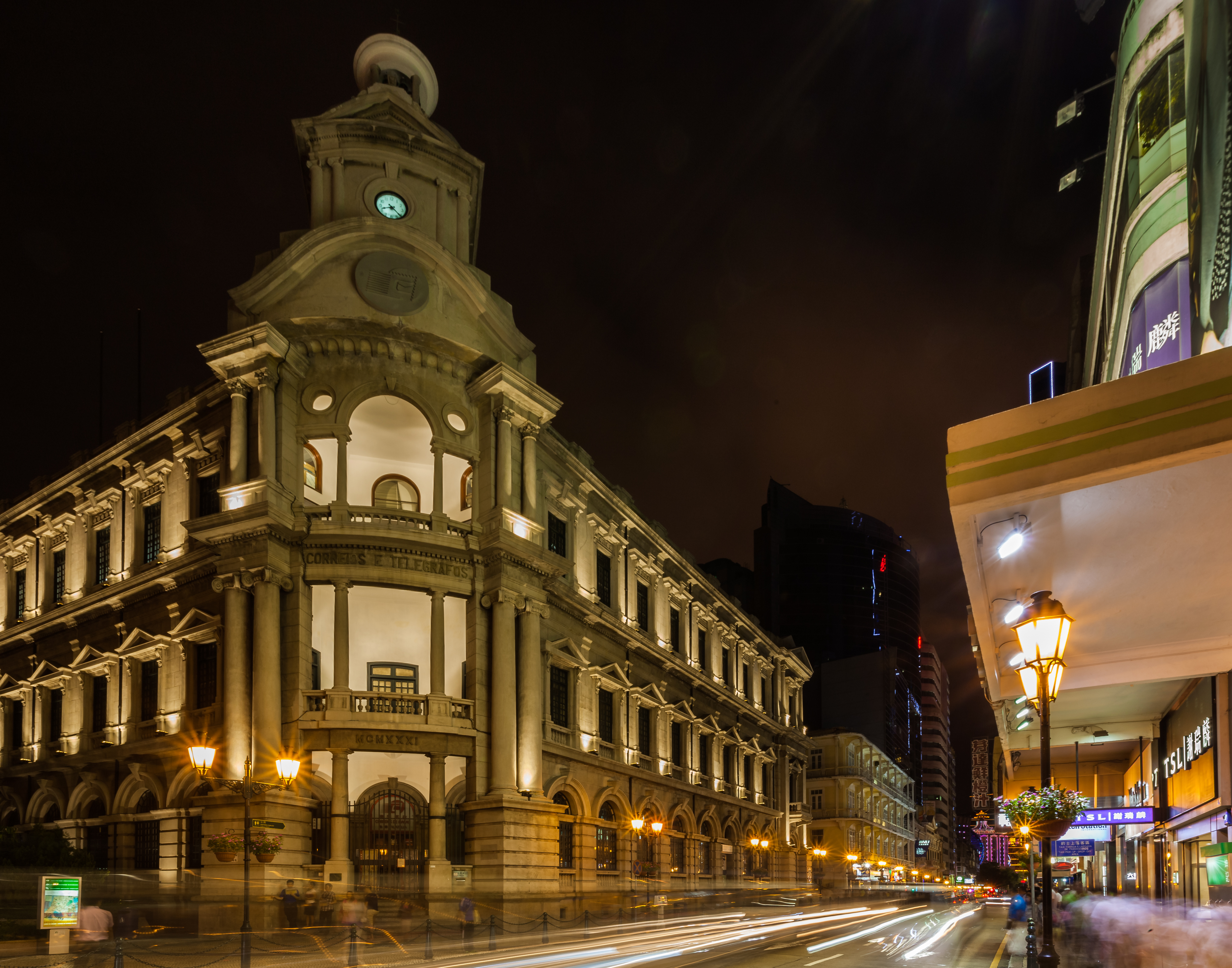
Building by night

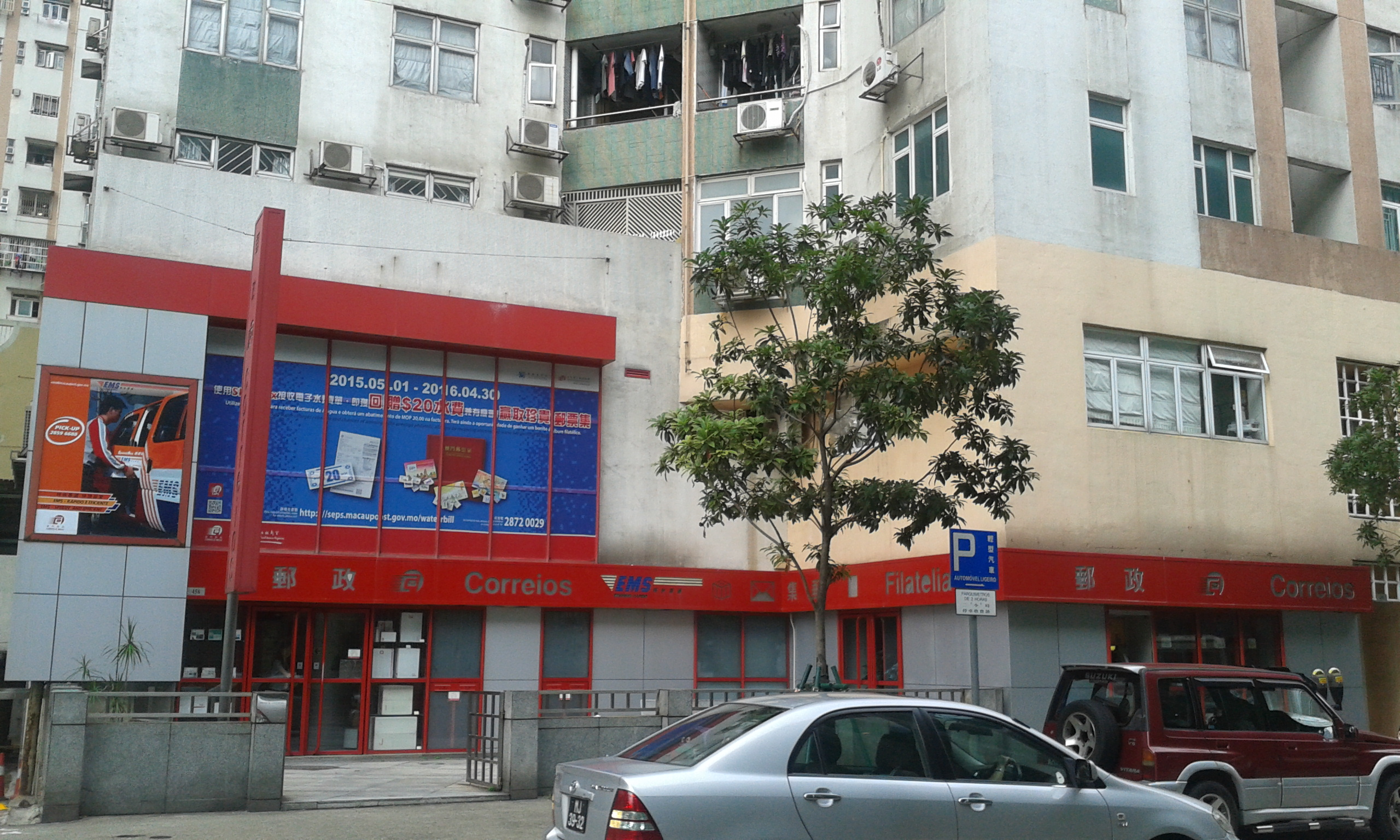
Nova Taipa Post Office

== Post boxes ==
CTT post boxes are red in colour as was the case in Hong Kong before 1997. The boxes bear CTT's name in Portuguese and Chinese.

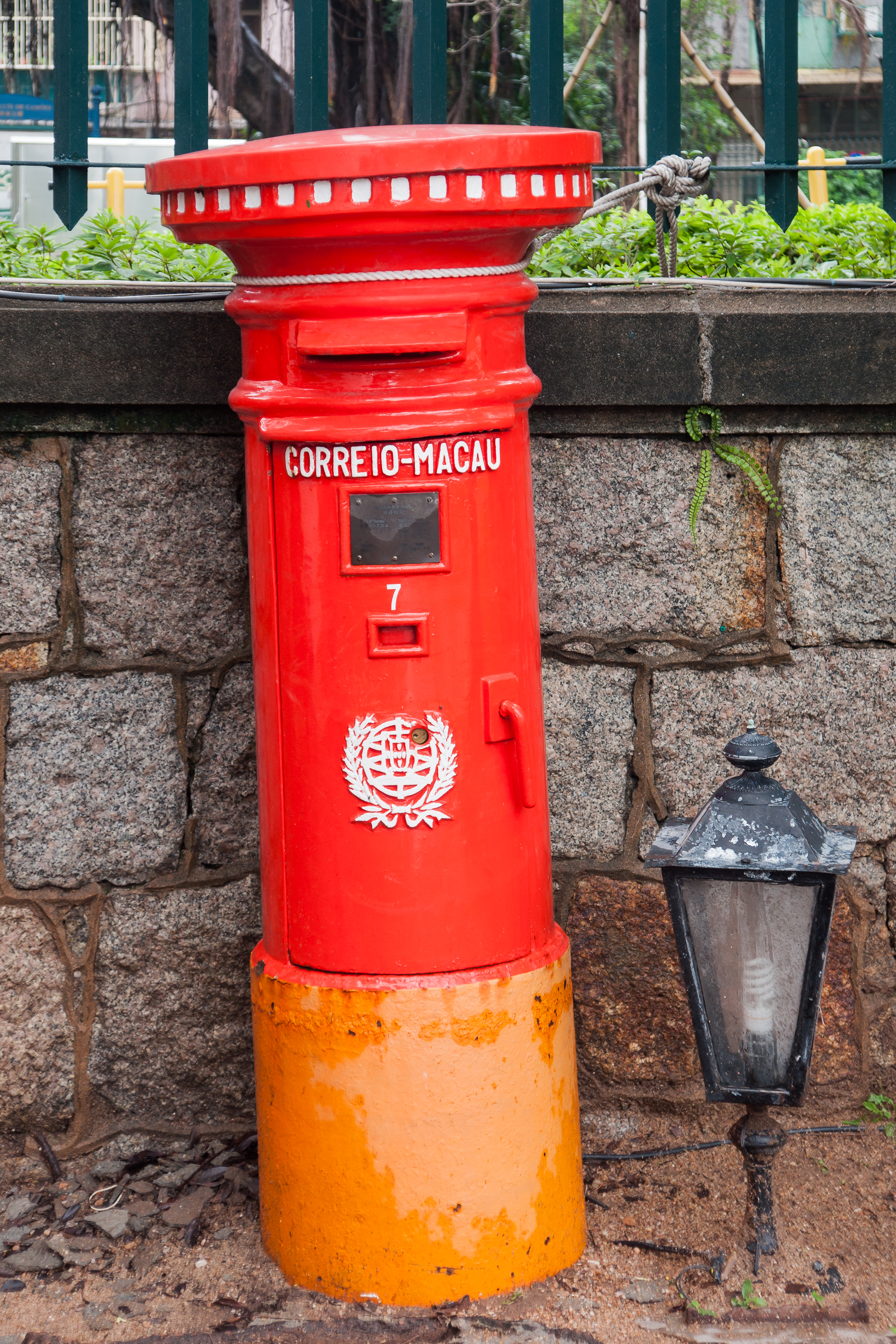
Postbox (old Style)

Auto Postbox

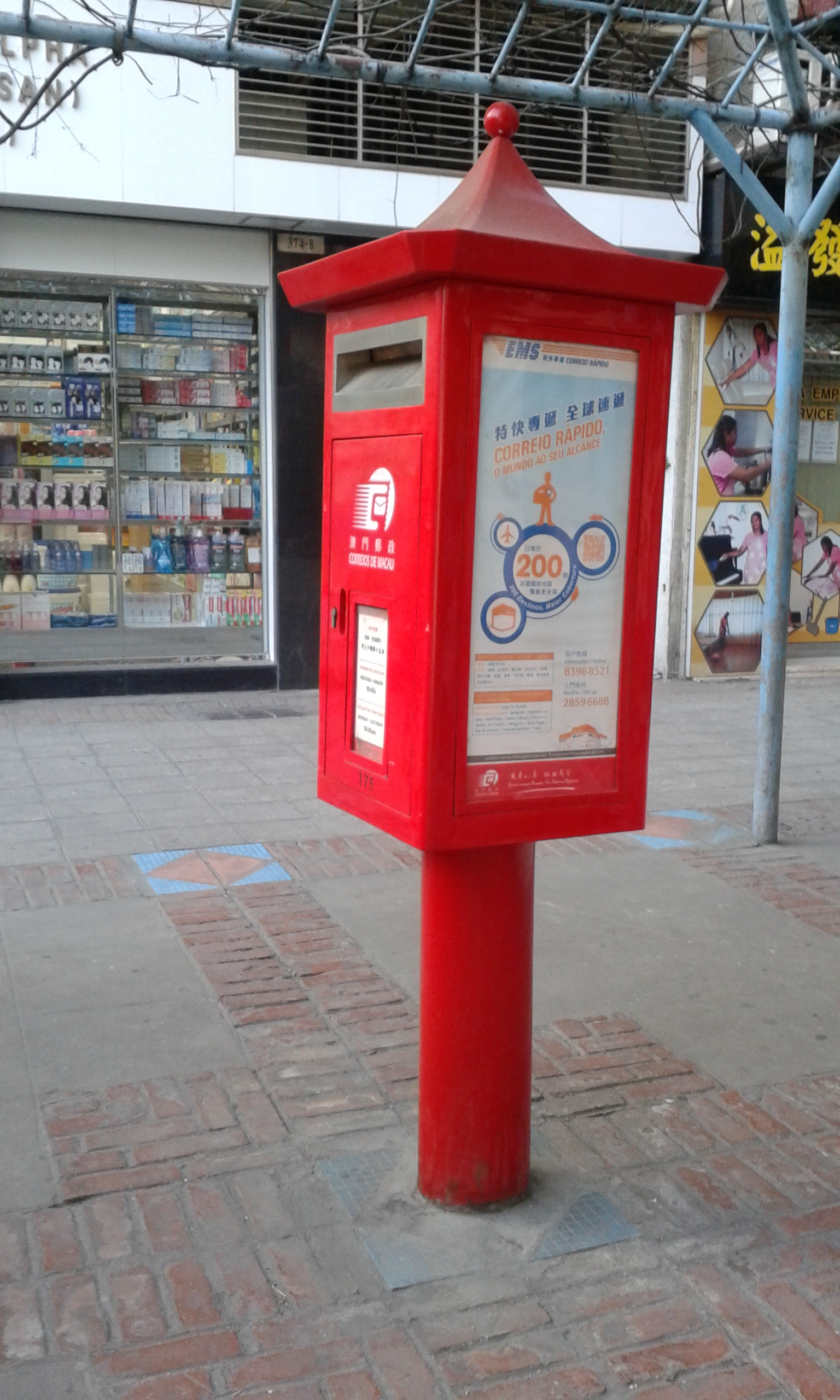
Postbox

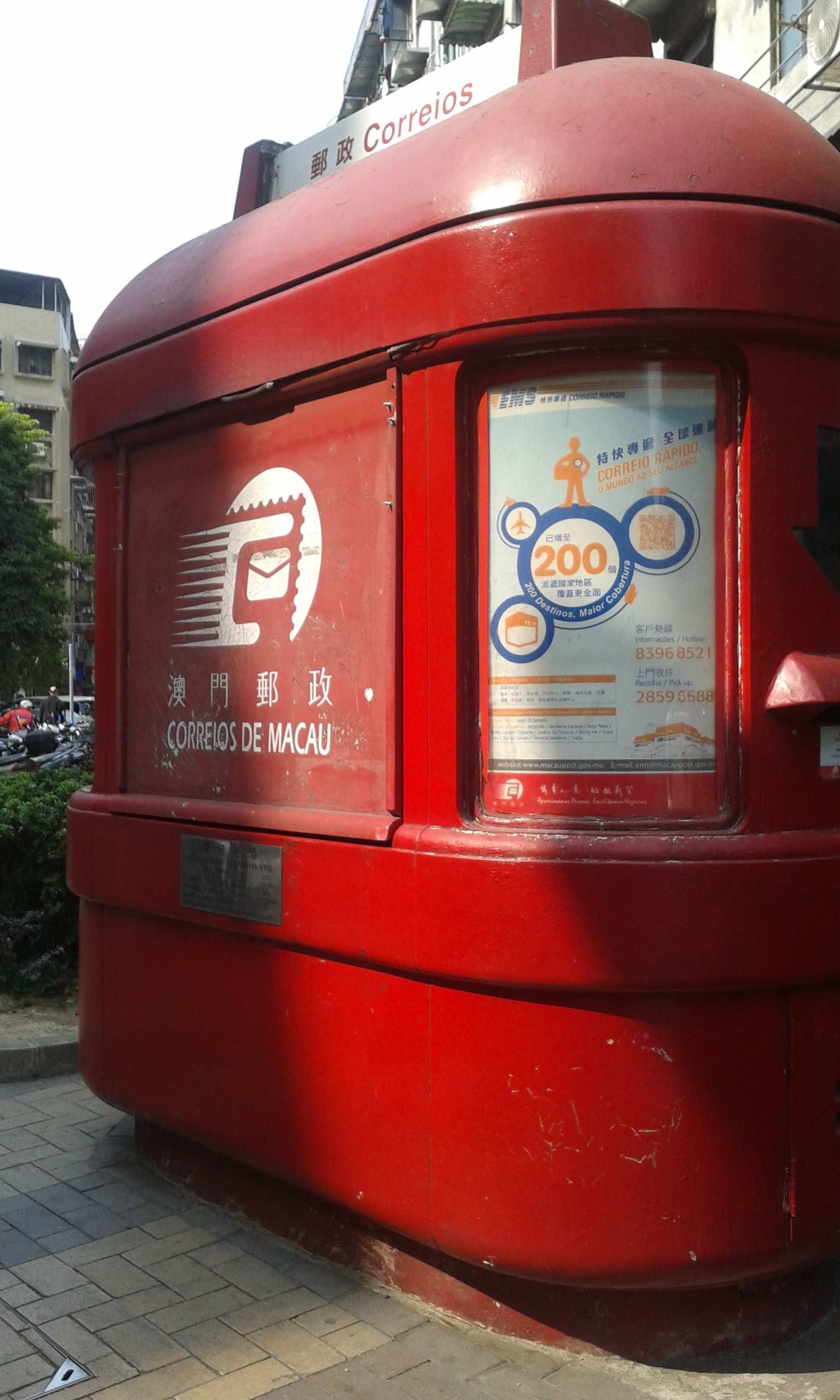
Post House

== See also ==
- List of companies of Macau
