= Civil Aviation Authority (Macau) =

- 民航局; Autoridade de Aviação Civil
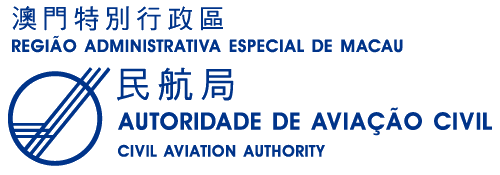

Agency overview
- Formed: 1987
- Preceding agency: Macau International Airport Office (O Gabinete do Aeroporto Internacional de Macau)
- Jurisdiction: Macau
- Headquarters: 18/F, Cheng Feng Commercial Centre, 336-342, Alameda Dr. Carlos D'Assumpção, Macau
- Agency executive: Simon Chan Weng Hong, President
- Parent agency: Secretariat for Transport and Public Works (Macau)
- Website: www.aacm.gov.mo

Civil Aviation Authority

Chinese name
- Traditional Chinese: 民航局
- Simplified Chinese: 民航局
Transcriptions
Standard Mandarin
- Hanyu Pinyin: Àomén Tèbié Xíngzhèngqū Mínhángjú
Yue: Cantonese
- Jyutping: Ou3mun4*2 Dak6bit6 Hang4zing3 Keoi1 man4 hong4 guk6

Portuguese name
- Portuguese: Autoridade de Aviação Civil

The Civil Aviation Authority (Chinese: 民航局, Portuguese: Autoridade de Aviação Civil, AACM) is the civil aviation authority of Macau. It is responsible for controlling and regulating the air traffic and airspace within Macau.

Its head office is on the 18th floor of the Cheng Feng Commercial Centre in Sé.

The AACM is an agency under the Secretariat for Transport and Public Works. It was formally created in 1991 to replace the Macau International Airport Office that had been established in 1987. Some of the roles of the Airport Office was taken over by the CAM-Macau International Airport Company Limited.

The AACM is headed by a president who reports to the general committee (as a member) and the administrative committee (as the head). As of 2013, Simon Chan Weng Hong is the president of the AACM.

Like its Hong Kong counterpart, the AACM is independent from the Civil Aviation Administration of China. The AACM controls the airspace within Macau. It also investigates aviation accidents and incidents.

== See also ==
- Civil Aviation Department (Hong Kong)
