= Health Bureau (Macau) =

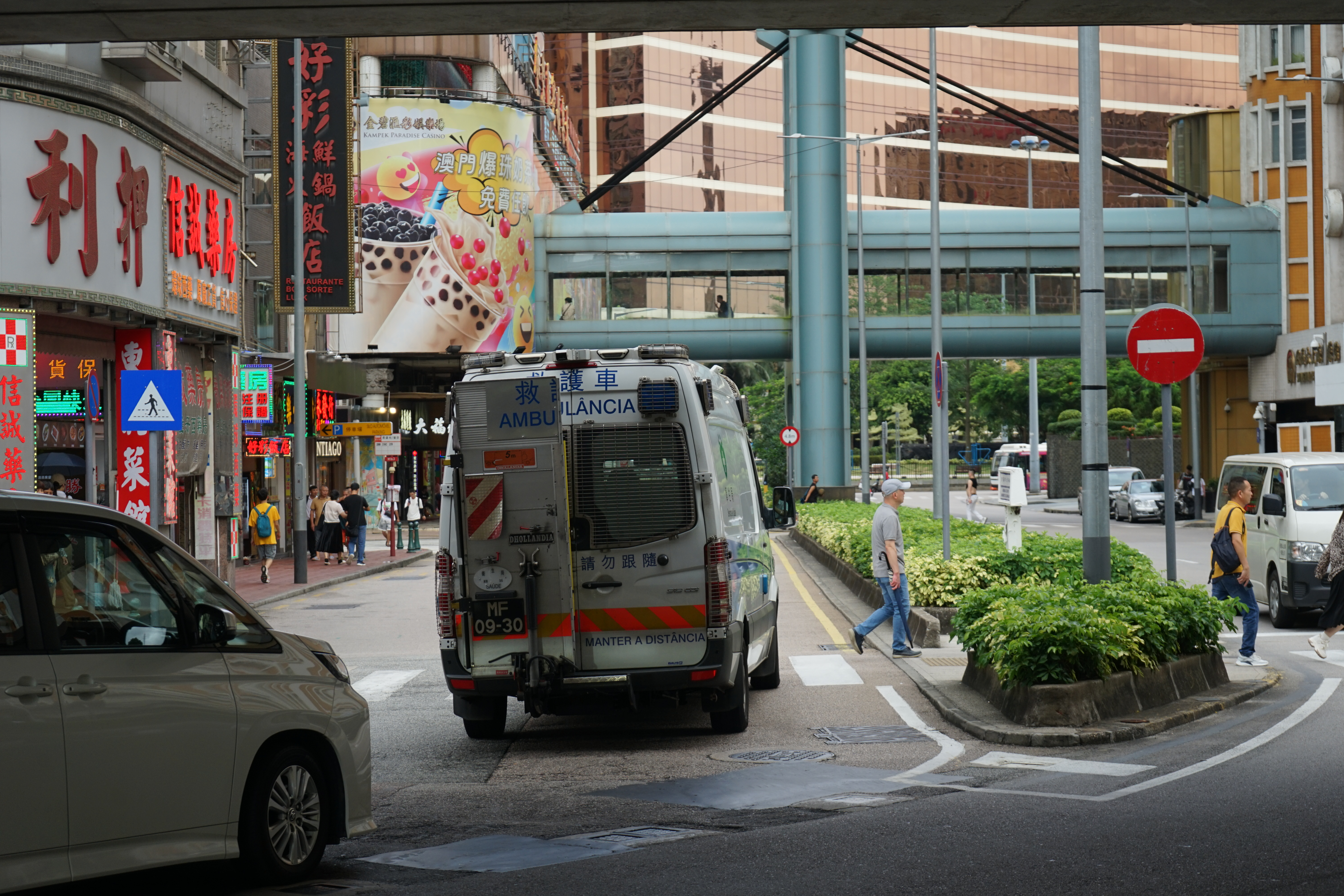
A Macau Health Bureau vehicle driving near Hotel Lisboa in Macau.

The Health Bureau (Chinese: 衛生局, Portuguese: Serviços de Saúde) in Macau is mainly responsible for coordinating the activities between the public and private organisations in the area of public health, and assure the health of citizens through specialised and primary health care services, as well as disease prevention and health promotion.

It also handles the organisation of care and prevention of diseases affecting the population, sets guidelines for hospitals and private health care providers, and issues licences.

The bureau is currently under Lo Iek Long.

== History ==
The Macau Centre for Disease Control and Prevention was established in 2001, which monitors the operation of hospitals, health centres, and the blood transfusion centre in Macau.

In January 2020, the Bureau was tasked to handle cases related to the COVID-19 pandemic.

On May 1, 2020, the Health Bureau officially launched a digital colour code system to help enforce anti-COVID-19 measures throughout Macau.

== Departments ==
- Conde de São Januário General Hospital
- Centre for Disease Control and Prevention (Macau)
- Health Centre (Macau)
- Private Medical Activity Licensing Unit
- Tobacco Control and Prevention Office
- Macau Public Health Laboratory
- Blood Transfusion Service
- Assessment Centre of Complaints on Medical Activities
- Division of Pharmaceutical Affairs
