= Secretary for Justice (Macau) =

Before December 1999, the Secretary for Justice (Portuguese: Secretaria da Justiça) was a bureau secretary and senior law officer in Portuguese Macau. The Secretary headed the Secretariat for Justice, which was responsible for legal affairs and public prosecution in the colony. The department was replaced by the position of Secretariat for Administration and Justice on 20 December 1999, following the handover of Macau.

List of responsibilities:

- Legal Affairs Bureau
- Printing Bureau
- International Law Office
- Gabinete para a Reforma Judica

== List of Secretariats ==
- Dr. Jorge Alberto Hagedorn Rangel - Secretary until 1999; now President of the Macau International Institute
- Ho Ven On - Assistant Secretary
- Jorge Noronha e Silveira - under secretary

== Attorney general ==
The former role of the Attorney General was that of the highest law officer of Macau.

- Antonio Simoes Redinha - last Attorney General of Macau
