= Commission of Audit =

Macau independent commission

Commission of Audit

The Commission of Audit (CA; Chinese: 審計署; Portuguese: Comissariado da Auditoria) is the auditor for the government of Macau to aid accountability by conducting independent audits of the government operations. The office has similar functions to auditors in other jurisdictions, but the Commissioner reports directly to the Chief Executive of Macau, not to Legislative Council of Macau and therefore lacks independence from political interference.

A list of commissioners:

- Fátima Choi Mei Lei 1999-2009
- Ho Veng On 2009–Present

== See also ==
- Canada Auditor General of Canada
- Hong Kong Director of Audit
- Inspector General
