= Jorge Alberto Hagedorn Rangel =

Portuguese civil servant

Jorge Alberto da Conceição Hagedorn Rangel

Secretary for Public Administration, Education and Youth
- In office 1991–1999
- Governor: Vasco Joaquim Rocha Vieira
- Succeeded by: Florinda Chan

Secretary for Education, Culture and Tourism
- In office 1981–1986

Member of Legislative Assembly of Macao
- In office 1976–1980

Personal details
- Born: 12 July 1943 (age 83) Portuguese Macau
- Education: University of Lisbon

Dr. Jorge Alberto da Conceição Hagedorn Rangel (born 12 July 1943) is a Macau politician who served as the Secretary for Public Administration, Education and Youth.

== Early life ==
Rangel was born into a Portuguese family in Macau.

== See also ==
- Politics of Macau
