= Secretary for Communications, Tourism and Culture =

The Secretary for Communications, Tourism and Culture was bureau secretary in the Portuguese administration in Macau. The Secretary was responsible for communications and promoting the colony of Macau. The department's sections were merged into the Secretariat for Social Affairs and Culture (Macau). Before the transfer of Communications to the Secretariat it was called Secretariat for Tourism and Culture.

The responsibilities for communications was transferred from the old Secretary for Public Works and Communications.

== Organisational structure ==
- Cultural Affairs Bureau
- Macau Government Tourist Office
- Macau Sports Development Board
- Institute of Tourism Studies
- Macau Grand Prix Committee
- Macau Tourism Office in Portugal

== List of Secretariats ==
- Dr. Antonio Salavessa da Costa 1998–1999
- Salavessa de Costa - under-secretary
