= Elsie Ao Ieong =

Macau government minister

- 歐陽瑜

Secretary for Social Affairs and Culture of Macau
- In office 21 December 2019 – present
- Preceded by: Alexis Tam

Personal details
- Occupation: Civil servant

Elsie Ao Ieong (Chinese: 歐陽瑜) is a Macau civil servant, serving as the Secretary for Social Affairs and Culture and Secretary of the Talents Development Committee in the Macau Government, and is currently their highest-ranking female civil servant. She previously headed the Macau Female Civil Servant Association.

== Early life and education ==
Elsie Ao Ieong has lived in Macau since the 1990s. She completed an undergraduate and master's degree in engineering and computer engineering respectively, and later earned a second post-graduate degree in comparative law.

== Career ==
Elsie Ao Ieong was a civil servant and headed Macau's Identification Services Bureau. She was later selected to be the Secretary for Social Affairs and Culture, replacing Alexis Tam. She is the only woman to be a part of the cabinet appointed by Ho Iat-Seng, the current Chief Executive of Macau. She is also the only woman member of Macau's Executive Council, making her the highest-ranking female civil servant in Macau. In 2022, she was given additional charge of Macau's Talents Development Committee, a government agency charged with developing human resources in Macau.

Elsie Ao Ieong previously headed the Macau Female Civil Servant Association.

As Secretary for Social Affairs and Culture, she has managed travel restrictions and quarantine regulations with respect to Macau's response to the global COVID-19 pandemic.
