= Secretary for Administration and Justice =

The Secretary for Administration and Justice (Chinese: 行政法務司; Portuguese: Secretaria para a Administração e Justiça) is the most senior cabinet role and key departments in the Government of Macau. When the Chief Executive is on leave, the Secretariat for Administration and Justice, according to Article 55 of the Basic Law, is of first priority to take up the responsibility of acting Chief Executive.

The department was the amalgamation of:

- Secretary for Justice
- Secretary for Public Administration, Education and Youth

List of responsibilities:

- Public Administration and Civil Service Bureau
- Legal Affairs Bureau
- Printing Bureau
- International Law Office
- Civic and Municipal Training Centre
- Judicial Reform Office (Gabinete para a Reforma Judica)

== List of Secretariats ==
Name	Assumed office	Left office	Term
Florinda da Rosa Silva Chan 陳麗敏	20 December 1999	20 December 2004	1
Florinda da Rosa Silva Chan 陳麗敏	20 December 2004	20 December 2009	2
Florinda da Rosa Silva Chan 陳麗敏	20 December 2009	20 December 2014	3
Sónia Chan Hoi Fan 陳海帆	20 December 2014	20 December 2019	4
André Cheong Weng Chon 張永春	20 December 2019	15 October 2025	5
Wong Sio Chak 黃少澤	16 October 2025		6

=== Former Officials ===
- Dr. Jorge Alberto Hagedorn Rangel - Secretary for Public Administration, Education and Youth

- Ho Ven On - Assistant Secretary

== Procurator-General ==
The Procurator General is the actual highest law officer in Macau and not the Secretary for Administration and Justice. It replace the role of Attorney General of Macau in 1999.

== See also ==
Other principal officials of Macau:

- Secretary for Economy and Finance
- Secretary for Security
- Secretary for Social Affairs and Culture
- Secretary for Transport and Public Works
