= Ao Man Long =

Macau government official

- 歐文龍

Secretary for Transport and Public Works of Macau
- In office 20 December 1999 – 6 December 2006
- Preceded by: José Alberto Alves de Paula as Secretary for Transport and Public Works of Macau
- Succeeded by: Lau Si Io

Personal details
- Born: December 1956 (age 69) Portuguese Macau
- Spouse: Camila Chan Meng-leng
- Education: National Taiwan University (BS); University of Macao (MBA)
- Profession: Civil engineer

Ao Man Long
- Traditional Chinese: 歐文龍
- Simplified Chinese: 欧文龙
Transcriptions
Standard Mandarin
- Hanyu Pinyin: Ōu Wénlóng
Yue: Cantonese
- Jyutping: au1 man4 lung4

Ao Man Long (Chinese: 歐文龍; born in December 1956) is a Macau politician who was the first Secretary for Transport and Public Works of the Macau Special Administrative Region of the People's Republic of China, from 20 December 1999 to 6 December 2006.

On 8 December 2006, Ao was arrested based on a case built by the Macau Commission Against Corruption, making him the highest-ranking official arrested in the history of Macau. Ao had allegedly offered preference in government works projects, and had amassed assets totalling 804 million patacas. On 30 January 2008, Ao was found guilty on 40 counts of bribe-taking, amongst others, and was sentenced to 27 years in prison. Ao was aided and abetted by four family members, who were also jailed for between 10 and 18 years for money laundering. On 31 May 2012, Ao was found guilty of taking bribes of more than 31.9 million patacas, and received a sentence of 29 years in prison. Joseph Lau and Steven Lo are both implicated and have been charged with offering tens of millions in bribes to Ao.

== Career ==
Ao is a graduate of Yuet Wah College, Macau. He graduated from National Taiwan University with a Bachelor of Science in civil engineering in 1982, and then earned a Master of Business Administration at the University of Macao. Ao joined the government in 1987. He was appointed as the first Secretary for Transport and Public Works after the handover of Macau from Portugal to the PRC on 20 December 1999.

== Arrest ==
On 6 December 2006, Ao was arrested for allegedly taking bribes and having engaged in irregular financial activities. The Macau Commission Against Corruption (CCAC) alleged that between 2002 and 2006 Ao received MOP 187 million in bribes from three real estate and construction companies, two from Macau and one from the mainland, in return for which Ao had allegedly offered preference in 20 government works projects. Ao allegedly had assets not commensurate with his earnings: Ao and his wife earned 14 million patacas from their official posts between 2000 and 2006, yet had accumulated assets totalling 804 million patacas (US$100m), equivalent to 57 times their earnings. Ao was charged with 76 counts, including corruption, bribe-taking, money laundering and abuse of power.

According to Article 50 of the Basic Law of Macau, the removal of secretaries requires Central Government approval. Citing "irrefutable evidence" of improper behaviour, Chief Executive Edmund Ho asked Beijing to remove Ao from office.

== First trial ==
Ao Man-long stood trial in Macau on 5 November 2007, facing 30 years in prison. Given Ao's status of Government Secretary (equivalent to Minister), he was tried directly in the Court of Final Appeal of the Macau SAR. Over one hundred witnesses were called to testify.

Although it was an open trial, the 500-page indictment was not made public when Ao was tried. Media representatives petitioned for its release, but it was denied by judge Viriato Manuel Pinheiro de Lima, who said it would affect witnesses' thoughts and testimony. The prosecution charged Ao with having received millions of dollars in kickbacks for contracts, including those for the dome constructed for the 2005 East Asian Games, the Venetian and the Galaxy StarWorld Hotel, from Ho Meng-fai, Chairman of San Meng Fai Engineering and Construction Company.

Anti-corruption officers were aided unwittingly by Ao, who kept details of every illegal transaction and the kickbacks he received in a notebook. Ho Meng-fai – who had jumped bail – confessed in statements given to the CCAC and the procurator's office that Ao offered to recommend his company to foreign investors in exchange for 2 to 3 percent of the winning tenders. Ho said between 2004 and 2006, he paid Ao about HK$140 million in kickbacks, for private projects only. During the trial, 7 witnesses, including Ho, went missing.

Ao allegedly set up shell companies a network of secret bank accounts in Hong Kong and the British Virgin Islands with the help of friends and family members to launder bribe money. Ao's father Ao Veng-Kong, brother Ao Man-Fu, and sister-in-law Ao Chan Va-Choi were charged with setting up overseas bank accounts and shell companies for Ao Man-long to handle kickbacks. The total deposits in more than a dozen Hong Kong bank accounts under his father's name exceeded HK$157 million as of December 2006. The three family members pleaded not guilty, claiming Ao Man-long opened the bank accounts for them. All family members were sentenced to prison terms by a decision of the Macau Court of Second Instance on 30 October 2008.

=== Verdict and sentencing ===
On 30 January 2008, Ao was found guilty on 40 counts of bribe-taking, 13 counts of money laundering, two counts of abuse of power, one count of incorrect declaration of assets and one count of holding assets from unknown sources; Ao was sentenced to 27 years in prison. About MOP 252 million of his assets in Macau were seized. Ao decided not to appeal. There were concerns voiced in the Macau media that Ao was the fall-guy, as most Macanese were sceptical that corruption on such a scale could take place without anyone else knowing or being involved. During his trial, Ao hinted that contacts valued at in excess of 6 million Patacas required the approval of his superior in government, Edmond Ho.

In a separate trial, his wife was sentenced in absentia to 23 years in jail for her role in laundering money. Ao's four family members, each accused of six to 14 counts of money laundering activities, were also jailed for between 10 and 18 years. Ao's wife is believed to have absconded to the United Kingdom. Macau authorities were co-operating with the ICAC in Hong Kong to retrieve an estimated HK$637 million (US$81.7 million), which was reportedly deposited in 39 Hong Kong bank accounts in Ao's name and 92 overseas bank accounts opened in the name of his relative-accomplices.

=== Appeals ===
Ao filed a motion before the Court of Appeal to un-freeze some of his personal bank accounts, on the grounds that those accounts were supposedly not linked to the corruption case, and were the actual accounts for receiving his salary. The motion was denied on 26 September 2008: according to the verdict of his corruption trial, all his money and personal possessions, even if purchased legally, now belonged to Macau.

== Second trial ==
In March 2008, reports emerged that a fresh set of criminal proceedings related to other acts of corruption were being investigated by the Macau Commission Against Corruption. In addition, the family members and the businessmen allegedly involved were appealing their convictions. A second trial took place before the Court of Final Appeal. The final decision was handed on 22 April 2009, and the total penalty was increased from 27 years of imprisonment to 28 1/2 years.

== May 2012 trial ==
On 31 May 2012, Ao was found guilty of taking bribes of more than 31.9 million patacas. Joseph Lau and Steven Lo are both implicated and have been charged with offering MCP20 million in bribes to Ao to secure five plots of land near the airport in Macau. The judge remarked that "no other officials involved in corruption in Asia and other countries can compare" to Ao. The maximum jail term is 30 years, according to the laws of Macau, thus the judge ordered Ao serve his 29-year term concurrent with his existing sentence.

== See also ==
- 2007 Macau transfer of sovereignty anniversary protest

Preceded by Alves Paula as Secretary for Transport and Public Works of Macau	Secretary for Transport and Public Works or Macau; 1999–2006	Succeeded by Lau Si Io
