= Lau Si Io =

Macanese government official

- 劉仕堯

Secretary for Transport and Public Works of Macau
- In office 14 February 2007 – 20 December 2014
- Preceded by: Edmund Ho Hau Wah (acting)
- Succeeded by: Raimundo Arrais do Rosário

Personal details
- Born: Portuguese Macau
- Education: University of Calgary

Lau Si Io
- Traditional Chinese: 劉仕堯
- Simplified Chinese: 刘仕尧
Transcriptions
Standard Mandarin
- Hanyu Pinyin: Liú Shìyáo
Yue: Cantonese
- Jyutping: lau4 si6 jiu4

Lau Si Io (劉仕堯) is a civil servant in Macau and the second Secretariat for Transport and Public Works.

== Biography ==
Lau was born and raised in Macau, high school graduated from Yuet Wah College. He obtained an engineering graduate from the University of Calgary. After three years in the private sector (1982–1984), Lau joined the civil service and worked for the then Leal Senado.

Lau has held various civil service positions:

- Assistant technician, Public Works Department
- Chief of sector, Public Works Department
- Chief of division, Public Works Department
- Chief of the Hygiene and Cleansing Department
- Vice-president and president of the Leal Senado
- Vice-president of the executive board of the Provisional Municipal Council of Macau
- President of the Administration Committee of the Civic and Municipal Affairs Bureau, 2002–2007

== See also ==
- Politics of Macau

Preceded by Edmund Ho Hau Wah – acting	Secretary for Transport and Public Works of Macau (interim until 2009); 2007–2014	Succeeded by Raimundo Arrais do Rosário
