= Secretary for Transport and Public Works =

Department of the Macau Government

The Secretary for Transport and Public Works (Chinese: 運輸工務司; Portuguese: Secretariado para os Transportes e Obras Públicas) is the department of the Macau Government responsible for overseeing a number of the region's important services.

== List of departments ==
- Cartography and Cadastre Bureau
- Marine and Water Bureau
- Macau Post
- Meteorological and Geophysical Bureau
  - based a Tapia Grande after moving from Fortaleza do Monte
- Housing Bureau
- Environmental Protection Bureau
- Civil Aviation Authority
- Infrastructure Development Office
- Energy Sector Development Office, to be integrated to the Environmental Protection Bureau by January 2021.
- Bureau of Telecommunications Regulation
- Land, Public Works and Transport Bureau

== List of Secretariats ==
No.	Name	Assumed office	Left office	Term
1	Ao Man Long 歐文龍	20 December 1999	20 December 2004	1
1	Ao Man Long 歐文龍	20 December 2004	6 December 2006	2
During this interval, Chief Executive Edmund Ho Hau Wah was the Interim; Secretary for Transport and Public Works. (6 December 2006 - 13 February 2007)				2
During this interval, IACM Vice Chairperson Lau Si Io was the Interim; Secretary for Transport and Public Works. (13 February 2007 - 20 December 2009)				2
2	Lau Si Io 劉仕堯	20 December 2009	20 December 2014	3
3	Raimundo Arrais do Rosário 羅立文 (Lo Lap Man)	20 December 2014	20 December 2019	4
3	Raimundo Arrais do Rosário 羅立文 (Lo Lap Man)	20 December 2019	20 December 2024	5
4	Tam Vai Man 譚偉文	20 December 2024	Incumbent; Term ends on 20 December 2029	6

=== Director ===
- Wong Chan Tong

== See also ==
- Transport in Macau

=== Other Secretariats ===
- Secretary for Administration and Justice (Macau)
- Secretary for Economy and Finance (Macau)
- Secretary for Security (Macau)
- Secretary for Social Affairs and Culture (Macau)
