= Ho Ven On =

Assistant Secretary for Administration, Education and Youth

Personal details
- Born: Macau
- Occupation: civil servant

Ho Ven On is a former civil servant in Macau and served as Assistant Secretary for Administration, Education and Youth during Portuguese rule of Macau.

He was one a few local Chinese in the senior ranks of the civil service in Macau.

== See also ==
- Politics of Macau
