= Secretary for Social Affairs and Budget =

Secretary for Social Affairs and Budget was a member of the government of Portuguese Macau. The Secretary headed the Secretariat is responsible for the health and social affairs in the colony.

The department was assigned to the Secretariat for Social Affairs and Culture and budgetary powers to the Secretariat for Economy and Finance.

== Organisational structure ==
- Health Bureau
- Social Welfare Bureau

== List of Secretariats ==
- Alarcão Troni (董樂勤)
