= Secretary for Social Affairs and Culture =

Government office and position in Macau

The Secretary for Social Affairs and Culture (Chinese: 社會文化司; Portuguese: Secretariado para os Assuntos Sociais e Cultura) is a department of the Macao Government. The Secretariat is responsible for the education, health, tourism, social affairs and culture issues in the region.

The current department took over the role formerly held by the:

- Secretary for Social Affairs and Budget (Portuguese: Secretariado para os Assuntos Sociais e Orçamento)
- Secretary for Communications, Tourism and Culture (Portuguese: Secretariado para as Comunicações, Turismo e Cultura)

== Organisational structure ==
- Office of the Secretary for Social Affairs and Culture
- Education and Youth Development Bureau
- Cultural Affairs Bureau
- Sports Bureau
- Health Bureau
- Pharmaceutical Administration Bureau
- Social Security Fund
- Cultural Development Fund
- University of Macau
- Macao Polytechnic University
- Macao University of Tourism

== List of secretaries ==
No.	Image	Name	Assumed office	Left office	Term
1		Fernando Chui Sai On 崔世安	20 December 1999	20 December 2004	1
1		Fernando Chui Sai On 崔世安	20 December 2004	12 May 2009	2
During this interval, Chief Executive Edmund Ho Hau Wah was the Interim; Secretary for Social Affairs and Culture. (12 May 2009 - 20 December 2009)					2
2		Cheong U 張裕	20 December 2009	20 December 2014	3
3		Alexis Tam Chong Veng 譚俊榮	20 December 2014	20 December 2019	4
4		Elsie Ao Ieong U 歐陽瑜	20 December 2019	20 December 2024	5
5		O Lam 柯嵐	20 December 2024	Incumbent; Term ends on 20 December 2029	6

=== Former officials ===
- Dr. Antonio Salavessa da Costa - Secretary for Communications, Tourism and Culture

== See also ==
Other principal officials of Macau:

- Secretary for Administration and Justice
- Secretary for Economy and Finance
- Secretary for Security
- Secretary for Transport and Public Works
