= Fernando Chui =

Macanese politician (born 1957)

Fernando Chui Sai On GCM GML
- 崔世安
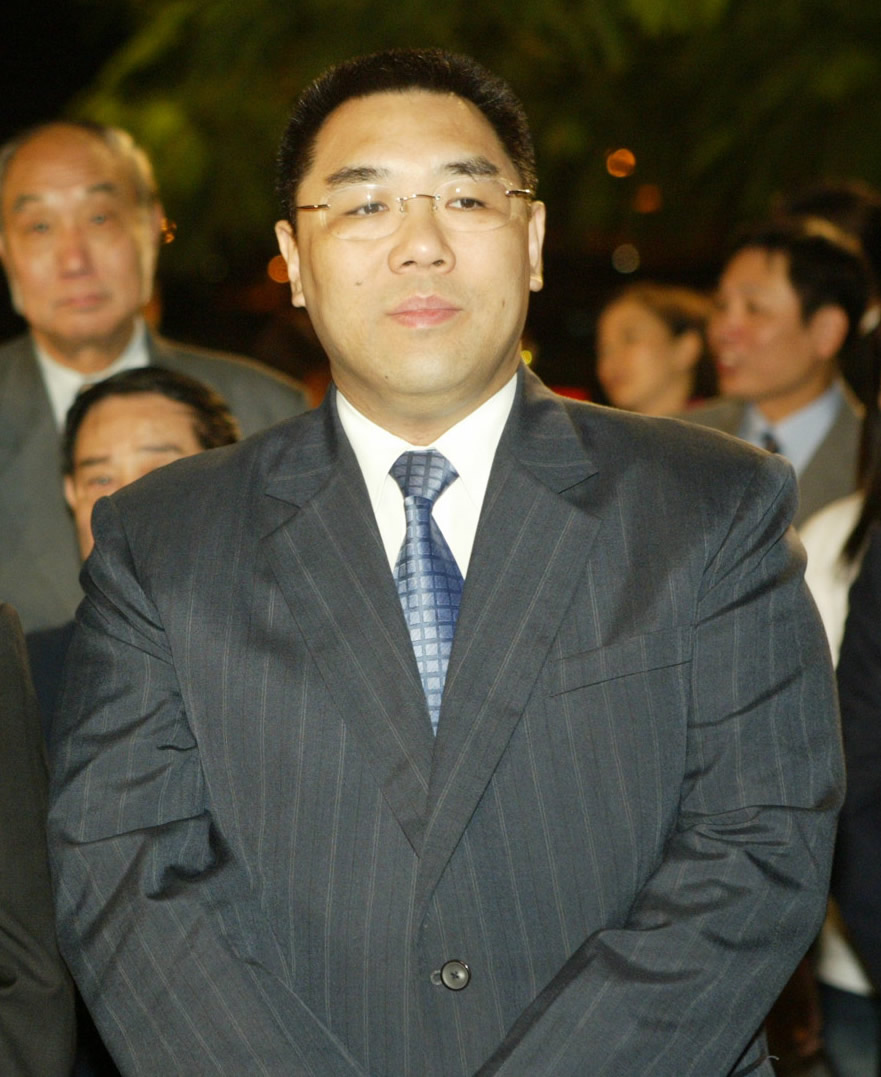
- Chui in 2004

2nd Chief Executive of Macau
- In office 20 December 2009 – 20 December 2019
- President: Hu Jintao; Xi Jinping
- Premier: Wen Jiabao; Li Keqiang
- Preceded by: Ho Hau Wah
- Succeeded by: Ho Iat Seng

Secretary for Social Affairs and Culture
- In office 20 December 1999 – 20 December 2009
- Chief Executive: Ho Hau Wah
- Preceded by: António Salavessa da Costa (Secretary for Communications, Tourism and Culture); Alarcão Troni (Secretary for Social Affairs and Budget)
- Succeeded by: Cheong U

Personal details
- Born: 13 January 1957 (age 69) Portuguese Macau
- Spouse: Winnie Fok Wai Fun
- Education: California State University, Sacramento (BA); University of Oklahoma (PhD)
- Occupation: Civil servant

Chinese name
- Chinese: 崔世安
Transcriptions
Standard Mandarin
- Hanyu Pinyin: Cuī Shì'ān
- Wade–Giles: Tsui Shih'an
- Tongyong Pinyin: Cuēi Shìh'ān
- Yale Romanization: Tswēi Shr̀'ān
- IPA: [tsʰwéɪ ʂɻ̩̂ˈán]
Yue: Cantonese
- Yale Romanization: Chēui Sái Ōn
- Jyutping: Ceoi1 Sai3 On1
- IPA: [tsʰɵ́y sɐ̄iʔɔ́ːn]

Fernando Chui Sai On GCM GML (Chinese: 崔世安; Jyutping: Ceoi1 Sai3 On1; born 13 January 1957) is a Macau politician who served as the 2nd chief executive of Macau from 2009 to 2019. He served as secretary for social and cultural affairs from 1999 to 2009.

Chui was born in 1957 to local construction tycoon Chui Tak Seng and Chan Keng Fan, the second son after Chui Sai Cheong. His wife is a niece of the late Hong Kong tycoon Henry Fok.

== Education ==
In Macau, Chui attended Lingnan High School and then finished high school at Hawaiian Mission Academy in Honolulu before pursuing his post-secondary education. He obtained his university training in the United States, where he obtained the following degrees:

- Bachelor's degree in City Hygiene Administration from California State University, Sacramento
- PhD in Public Health at the University of Oklahoma
- Registered member of the American Association of Public Hygiene
- Registered member of the American Association for the Management of Medical Affairs

He was guest professor at the Huanan Teachers Training University.

Due to studying in the United States at a younger age, Chui did not have the opportunity to study Mandarin (Putonghua), and thus does not speak it well. This was evident when he made his oath of acceptance as Chief Executive of Macau in front of Chinese leader Hu Jintao.

== Chief Executive of Macau ==
Prior to becoming Chief Executive, Chui served as a member of the 5th Legislative Assembly of Macau.

In June 2009 Chui was declared to be the sole candidate for the position of Macau's chief executive. He was nominated by 286 members of the 300-member election committee. On election day, 26 July 282 committee members voted for Chui (14 blank, 4 abstention), and was subsequently appointed by Wen Jiabao, Premier of China. He assumed his new role as Chief Executive of Macau in December 2009.

On 31 August 2014, Chui was re-elected as Macau's Chief Executive with 380 votes from the 400-member election committee. Meanwhile, 7,762 Macau residents voted having no confidence in Chui becoming the Chief Executive in an unofficial "referendum".

== List of policy addresses ==
Year	English title	Portuguese title	Chinese title
2017	Development Plan in Progress for Building a Perfect Home	"Implementação Progressiva do Planeamento, Construção Conjunta de um Bom Lar"	逐步落實規劃 共建美好家園
2016	Boosting the economy, focusing on livelihoods, and ensuring stable development	"Impulsionar a economia, promover o bem-estar da população, consolidar o desenvolvimento"	促經濟 重民生 穩發展
2015	Coordinate planning to ensure stable development Converge collective wisdom to open new chapters	"Coordenar o planeamento, promover o desenvolvimento estável Reunir sabedorias da sociedade, alcançar conjuntamente novos progressos"	統籌規劃 穩健發展 匯聚民智 同創新篇
2014	Enhance Underlying Strength and Promote Sustainable Development	"Aumentar a capacidade global e promover o desenvolvimento sustentável"	增強綜合實力 促進持續發展
2013	Enhance the Well-being of Society and Prepare for Long-term Development	"Melhorar o bem-estar da população e planear o desenvolvimento a longo prazo"	增進民生福祉 立足長遠發展
2012	Promoting Adequate Diversification of the Economy and Raising Overall Standard of Living	Promover a diversificação adequada da economia e elevar a qualidade de vida da população	推動經濟適度多元 提高民生綜合水平
2011	Adopting a Scientific Approach to Public Administration; Drawing a Blueprint for Future Development	"Desenvolvimento concertado e progresso harmonioso"	落實科學施政 規劃發展藍圖
2010	Coordinated Development in Harmony	"Desenvolvimento concertado e progresso harmonioso"	協調發展 和諧共進

== Election results ==
=== Legislative Assembly ===
Year	Candidate	Hare quota	Mandate	List Votes	List Pct
1992	Fernando Chui (UPD)	3,271	No.5/8	6,543	23.75%

=== Chief Executive ===
Year	Candidate	Votes	Pct
2009	Fernando Chui	282	95.27%
2014	Fernando Chui	380	96.95%

== Charities ==
- Executive manager and director of Medical and Health Department of the Tung Sin Tong Charitable Institution
- President of Macau Jaycees
- Executive Director of Macau Kiang Wu Hospital Charitable Association
- board member of the Macau Eye-Bank Foundation
- Vice President of the Association of the Management Professionals
- Honorary President of the Association of Nursing Staff of Macau

Chui is also involved in youth and education causes including:

- tutor in the Chamber of Commerce for International Youth
- member of the Youth Committee of the Macau Government
- headmaster of the Kiang Ping School
- President of the Youth Association of the Kiang Wu Hospital
- member and Standing Committee member of All-China Youth Federation

== Scandals ==
Chui has been linked to several scandals during his time as a minister of Edmund Ho's administration.

Most notably, the East Asian Games in 2005 were run under Chui's portfolio and put him in the midst of the Ao Man Long scandal. The games ran over budget by 70%. Ao allegedly received a MOP50 million (US$6.2 million) bribe in connection with the construction contract for the games' centerpiece, the Macau Dome indoor arena. Overall, that project wound up costing MOP640 million, MOP285 million over budget. As a result, he was extremely unpopular amongst the pro-democracy camp even before he was elected as the chief executive. In 2016, Chui was caught up in allegations of transferring Macau's reserves to the mainland. He was accused of favouritism after the Macau Foundation – a quasi-official foundation of which he is chairman and of which his brother heads the supervisory board – donated 100 million yuan ($15.4 million) of public money to Jinan University in Guangzhou, of which he is deputy head of the board. The Macanese government said that the donation was made in return for China's long-standing support to the SAR.

== Honours ==
- Grand-Cross of the Order of Merit, Portugal (9 May 2014)
- Grand Lotus Medal of Honour, Macau (19 December 2020)

Political offices
Preceded by Edmund Ho Hau Wah	Chief Executive of Macau; 2009–2019	Succeeded by Ho Iat Seng
Preceded by Antonio Salavessa da Costa as Secretary for Communications, Tourism and Culture	Macau Secretary for Social Affairs and Culture; 1999–2009	Succeeded by Cheong U
Preceded by Alarcão Troni as Secretary for Social Affairs and Budget	Macau Secretary for Social Affairs and Culture; 1999–2009	Succeeded by Cheong U
Order of precedence
First	Macau order of precedence Chief Executive	Succeeded by Sam Hou Fai; President of the Court of Final Appeal
Preceded by CY Leung; Chief Executive of Hong Kong SAR	Orders of precedence in the People's Republic of China; Chief Executive of Macau SAR	Incumbent
