= Commission Against Corruption =

Anti-corruption agency in Macau

- Logo of CCAC
- Abbreviation: CCAC

Agency overview
- Formed: 1999
- Preceding agency: High Commission Against Corruption and Administrative Illegality

Jurisdictional structure
- Legal jurisdiction: Macau
- Constituting instrument: Article 59 of Basic Law of Macau
- Specialist jurisdiction: Anti-corruption

Operational structure
- Headquarters: 105 Avenida Xian Xing Hai, Centro Golden Dragon, 17.o Andar.
- Elected officer responsible: Ho Iat Seng, Chief Executive of Macau
- Agency executive: Chan Tsz King, Commissioner

Website
- www.ccac.org.mo

Commission Against Corruption

Chinese name
- Chinese: 廉政公署
Transcriptions
Standard Mandarin
- Hanyu Pinyin: Liánzhèng Gōngshǔ
Yue: Cantonese
- Jyutping: lim4 zing3 gung1 cyu5

High Commission Against Corruption and Administrative Illegality
- Chinese: 反貪污暨反行政違法性高級專員公署
Transcriptions

Portuguese name
- Portuguese: Comissariado contra a Corrupção (CCAC)

The Commission Against Corruption (CCAC; Chinese: 廉政公署; Portuguese: Comissariado contra a Corrupção) is the statutory independent anti-corruption body of Macau with the primary objective of combating corruption, bribery, and other illicit activities in both the public and private sectors. Established in 1999 under the Article 59 of the Macau Basic Law, the CCAC is headed by the Commissioner, who reports directly to the Chief Executive of Macau.

The establishment of the CCAC came as a response to growing concerns over corruption and maladministration in Macau during the late 1990s, as the region transitioned from Portugal to China. The commission was created with the aim of ensuring transparency, accountability, and the rule of law, in line with Macau's Basic Law and the principle of "one country, two systems." Since its inception, the CCAC has played a critical role in Macau's fight against corruption and has contributed significantly to the region's reputation for good governance and adherence to the rule of law.

== History ==
The High Commission Against Corruption and Administrative Illegality (ACCCIA) was created by the Portuguese Macau government in 1992 to replace some of the anti-corruption duties conducted by Macau Judicial Police forces under Law No. 11/90/M. There was some early attempt to establish an agency since 1975, but no progress was made under the direction of former Macau Governor Raul Leandrodos Santos. This was followed by deliberations to establish an "Anti-Corruption Committee" in 1983.

The ACCCIA's operations throughout Portuguese Macau was badly affected by its weak mandate. This was because there was no agreement with the governor and the Legislative Assembly of Macau on what powers it has to conduct anti-corruption investigation.

On 20 December 1999, the CCAC was established by the Macau SAR government in accordance to the SAR's Basic Law under Article 59.

In 2005, the Macau CCAC initiated an investigation into Ao Man-long, who was serving as Macau's Secretary of Public Works and Transport at the time, on suspicions of involvement in money laundering. This investigation began after Hong Kong ICAC officers informed the Macau CCAC that their ongoing money laundering case likely implicated him. Consequently, Ao was arrested on 6 December 2006, and removed from his post the following day, 7 December 2006.

On 4 January 2011, Chan Seak Hou and Tou Wai Fong resigned from their position as deputy commissioners and were reassigned to the Public Prosecutions Office. On 1 January 2011, Kuan Kun Hong was appointed as the CCAC's deputy commissioner.

In November 2013, the CCAC released an investigation and analysis report on complaints regarding the Granting of Public Service of Road Mass Transport. The original complaint was received on 30 May 2013, and due to the filing of bankruptcy of Reolian on 3 October 2013, the CCAC released their findings. As one of the results of the report, lawmakers in Macau suggested Secretary for Transport and Public Works, Lau Si Io, to resign.

== Duties ==
Per Law No. 10/2000 of 14 August, the CCAC carries the following major statutory duties:

- To carry out preventive actions against acts of corruption or fraud.
- To investigate any crimes of corruption and fraud committed by civil servants.
- To investigate allegation of corruption and fraud in electoral registration and election of members of the institutions in the Macau SAR.
- To protect human rights, freedom and legitimate interests of individuals, as well as to uphold fairness, lawfulness and efficiency of the public administration.

== Officials ==
The following were appointed to head the CCAC (and its predecessor, the ACCCIA):

=== High Commissioner Against Corruption and Administrative Illegality ===
HCACAI was appointed by the Governor of Macau.

- Jorge Alberto Aragao Seia, 1991–1995
- Luis Manuel Guerreiro de Mendonca Freitas, 1995–1999

=== Commissioners Against Corruption of Macau ===
The head of the CCAC is appointed by the Chief Executive of Macau.

- Cheong U, 1999–2009
- Vasco Fong Man Chong, 2009–2014
- André Cheong Weng Chon, 2014–2019
- Chan Tsz King, 2019–present

=== Deputy Commissioners Against Corruption of Macau ===
- Kuan Kun Hong, January 2011–present

== See also ==
- ICAC, a similar agency in Hong Kong and the model for Macau
