= Index of Macau-related articles =

Articles (arranged alphabetically) related to Macau include:

== 0-9 ==
- June 24
- December 20

== A ==
- A-Ma Temple
- Age of Discovery
- Aircraft hijacking
- Air Koryo
- Air Macau
- Ponte da Amizade
- List of assassinated people
- Assembleia Municipal das Ilhas
- Assembleia Municipal de Macau
- Associação dos Radioamadores de Macau
- Aureo Castro Nunes e Castro

== B ==
- Baiyue
- Macao Basic Law
- Carlos Felipe Ximenes Belo
- Dines Bjørner

== C ==
- Cantonese
- Cantonese opera
- Canidrome (Macau)
- Card game
- Casino Lisboa, Macau
- Cathedral Parish (Freguesia da Sé)
- Catholic religious institutions, associations, and communities in Macau
- Chief Executive
- Chief Executive of Macau
- China
- List of China administrative regions by population density
- China proper
- Chinese character
- Chinese Domain Name Consortium
- Chinese language
- Chinese Peruvian
- Chinese spoken language
- China Travel Service Building, Macau
- Chinese white dolphin
- Church of the United Brethren in Christ
- City-state
- List of national coats of arms
- List of colonial governors in 1706
- List of colonial governors in 1758
- Commission Against Corruption
- Communications in Macau
- Concelho
- Constitution of China
- Cotai
- Cotai Strip
- List of countries by continent
- List of country calling codes
- Rua do Cunha
- Kristang language (Cristão)
- Kristang people (Cristão)
- Culture of Macau

== D ==
- Fernao Pires de Andrade
- Demographics of Macau
- Dragon boat race
- Driving on the left or right

== E ==
- East Asia
- Economy of Macau
- Education in Macau
- Elections in Macau
- EVA Air

== F ==
- Jose dos Santos Ferreira
- List of films set in Macau
- Flag of Macau
- Free port
- Freguesia (Macau)
- Functional constituency

== G ==
- Gambling in Macau
- Geography of Macau
- Ponte Governador Nobre de Carvalho
- Governor of Macau
- Macau Grand Prix
- Greyhound racing
- Guangdong

== H ==
- Hac Sa Beach
- Hippodromo
- History of China
- History of Hong Kong
- History of Macau
- History of Portugal
- Edmund Ho
- Stanley Ho
- Homosexuality in China
- Hong Kong
- Hong Kong International Airport
- Hong Kong-Zhuhai-Macau Bridge
- Hopewell Highway Infrastructure Ltd

== I ==
- Lists of incumbents
- ISO 3166-1:MO
- ISO 3166-2:MO
- Immigration to Macau

== J ==
- Jean-François de Galaup, comte de La Pérouse

== K ==
- Kun Iam Temple
- Kwang-Chou-Wan
- Kirwitzer, Wenzeslas Pantaleon

== L ==
- Leon Lai
- Land borders
- Languages of China
- Legal age to purchase alcoholic beverages
- Liang Fa
- Library of Congress Country Studies
- List of bridges and tunnels in Macau
- Lu Muzhen

== M ==
- .mo
- Macanese (disambiguation)
- Macanese cuisine
- Macanese language
- Macanese people
- Macau
- Macao (1952 film)
- Macao Daily News
- Macau (game)
- Macau International Airport
- Macau Jockey Club
- Macau Peninsula
- Macau Tower
- Mainland China
- Matsu (goddess)
- MGM Grand Macau
- Military of Macau
- List of mobile country codes
- Monetary Authority of Macau
- List of movies set in Hong Kong
- Municipalities of Macau
  - Municipality of Macau
  - Municipality of the Islands
- Music of Macau

== N ==
- Na Tcha Temple
- Gallery of national flags
- Northern Asia-Pacific Division of Seventh-day Adventists
- Freguesia de Nossa Senhora de Fátima
- Freguesia de Nossa Senhora do Carmo
- Chinese numerals
- Nanhaipotamon

== O ==
- List of official languages
- Our Lady of Fatima
- Our Lady of Fatima Parish, Macau
- Our Lady Carmo Parish

== P ==
- Pacific Century Cyberworks
- List of cities and parishes in Macau
- Harry Smith Parkes
- Pataca
- People's Republic of China
- Administrative divisions of the People's Republic of China
- Political divisions of Portugal
- Lists of political parties
- List of political parties in Macau
- Politics of Macau
- Portas do Cerco
- Portugal
- Portuguese Creole
- Portuguese language
- Province of China
- Public Security Police Force of Macau
- Puxi
- Pyongyang

== R ==
- Michelle Reis
- Republic of China
- Rotary International
- Ruins of St. Paul

== S ==
- Sacra Congregatio de Propaganda Fide
- Sam Kai Vui Kun
- Ponte de Sai Van
- St. Anthony Parish (Freguesia de Santo Antonio)
- St. Francisco Xavier Parish (Freguesia de São Francisco Xavier)
- St. Lawrence Parish (Freguesia de São Lourenco)
- St. Lazarus Parish (Freguesia de São Lazaro)
- Cathedral of Saint Paul
- António de Oliveira Salazar
- Sands Macau
- Takuma Sato
- Freguesia da Sé
- Sebastian I of Portugal
- Macau Security Force
- Severe acute respiratory syndrome
- Shangchuan Island
- Sheng Kung Hui
- SmarTone
- Society of Jesus
- Soler
- South China Sea
- State Council of the People's Republic of China
- List of state leaders in 2002
- List of state leaders in 2003
- List of state leaders in 2004
- Sub-replacement fertility
- Sun Yat-sen
- Sun Yat Sen Memorial House

== T ==
- Taipa
- Dom Justo Takayama
- Tam Kung
- Tam Kung Temple (Macau)
- Tiago Monteiro
- Timeline of Chinese history
- Time zone
- Tourism
- Tourism in Macau
- Traditional Chinese characters
- Transmac (Transportes Urbanos de Macau SARL)
- TCM (Transportas Companhia de Macau)
- Transport in Hong Kong
- Treaty of Tordesillas
- Triad (organized crime)
- Lists of tropical cyclone names
- TurboJET
- Twins (musical group)

== U ==
- Unequal Treaties
- Union for Development
- List of universities and colleges in Macau
- University of Macau
- UNU-IIST (United Nations University / International Institute for Software Technology)

== V ==
- Va Kio Daily
- Vasco Joaquim Rocha Vieira
- The Venetian Macao

== W ==
- Gordon Wu
- Wynn Macau

== X ==
- Xinhua News Agency

== See also ==
- List of China-related topics
- List of Taiwan-related topics
- Lists of country-related topics
