= List of bridges and tunnels in Macau =

The following is an incomplete List of bridges and tunnels in Macau, China.

== Bridges ==
Bridges are one of the critical infrastructures for Macau, since where includes two islands and is surrounded by the seashores of Mainland China.

Formal name (in English)	Official name (in Portuguese)	Year opened	Length (KM)	Franchise lasts until	Owner/Operator	Toll in MOP	Traffic volume	Load capacity
Amizade Bridge	Ponte da Amizade	1994	4.7	N/A	Government of Macau	Free		
Governador Nobre de Carvalho Bridge	Ponte Governador Nobre de Carvalho	1974	2.6	N/A	Government of Macau	Free		
Sai Van Bridge	Ponte de Sai Van	2004	2.2	N/A	Government of Macau	Free		
Lotus Bridge	Ponte Flor de Lótus	1999	1.78	N/A	Government of Macau	Free		
Macau Bridge	Ponte Macau	2024	3.97	N/A	Government of Macau	Free		

== Bridge-Causeway-Tunnel ==
Formal name (in English)	Official name (in Portuguese)	Year opened	Length (KM)	Owner/Operator	Toll in CNY	Traffice volume	Load capacity
Hong Kong-Zhuhai-Macau Bridge	Ponte Hong Kong-Zhuhai-Macau	2018	39		Cars ¥150 Coaches ¥200; Shuttle buses ¥300; Container trucks ¥115; Goods vehicles ¥60		

== Causeways ==
Macau had one causeway when Coloane and Taipa were separate islands. The roadway was not a bridge, but a road built on top of the water. The two islands have since been infilled and the former causeway is now an inland roadway.

Formal name (in English)	Official name (in Portuguese)	Year opened	Length (KM)	Owner/Operator	Toll in MOP	Traffic volume	Load capacity
Taipa-Coloane Causeway	Estrada do Istmo	1969	2.2	Government of Macau	Free		

== Tunnels ==
Macau currently has several tunnels. One connects two neighbourhoods on Macau Peninsula cutoff by hills, and one connects Cotai with University of Macau Hengqin Campus. There are also other tunnels on the island of Taipa.

Formal name (in English)	Official name (in Portuguese)	Year opened	Length (KM)	Owner/Operator	Toll in MOP	Traffic volume	Load capacity
Guia Hill Tunnel	Túnel da Guia	1990	0.284	Government of Macau	Free		
Hengqin Underwater Tunnel	Túnel Subaquático de Hengqin	2013	1.57	Government of Macau	Free		
Taipa Tunnel	Túnel da Taipa			Government of Macau	Free		

- Túnel da Rotunda do Istmo - connects Avenida Wai Long to Estrada da Baía de Nossa Senhora da Esperança, bypassing the roundabout.
- Túnel de Ká Hó – Coloane
- Túnel da Colina de Taipa Grande (planned)

== Viaducts ==
- Avenida do Comendador Ho Yin
