= Architecture of Macau =

The architecture of Macau is the architecture that is found in Macau. Macau has diverse architecture from the casinos in its casino region to its tallest building, Grand Lisboa (which stands at 258 metres; 846 ft). Macau is influenced by both Cantonese and Portuguese cultures.

== Background ==
Macau is a large city located off the south coast of Mainland China, with a population of approximately 630,000 people. and the official native languages being Cantonese and Portuguese. Macau is classified as a special administrative region (SAR), meaning it has separate executive, legislative and judicial systems to China. Macau was previously a Portuguese dependency, which ended in 1999 when it became autonomous. The architecture of Macau encompasses a mixture of World Heritage listed and modern buildings, as well as multiple bridges and tunnels.

== Casinos in Macau ==
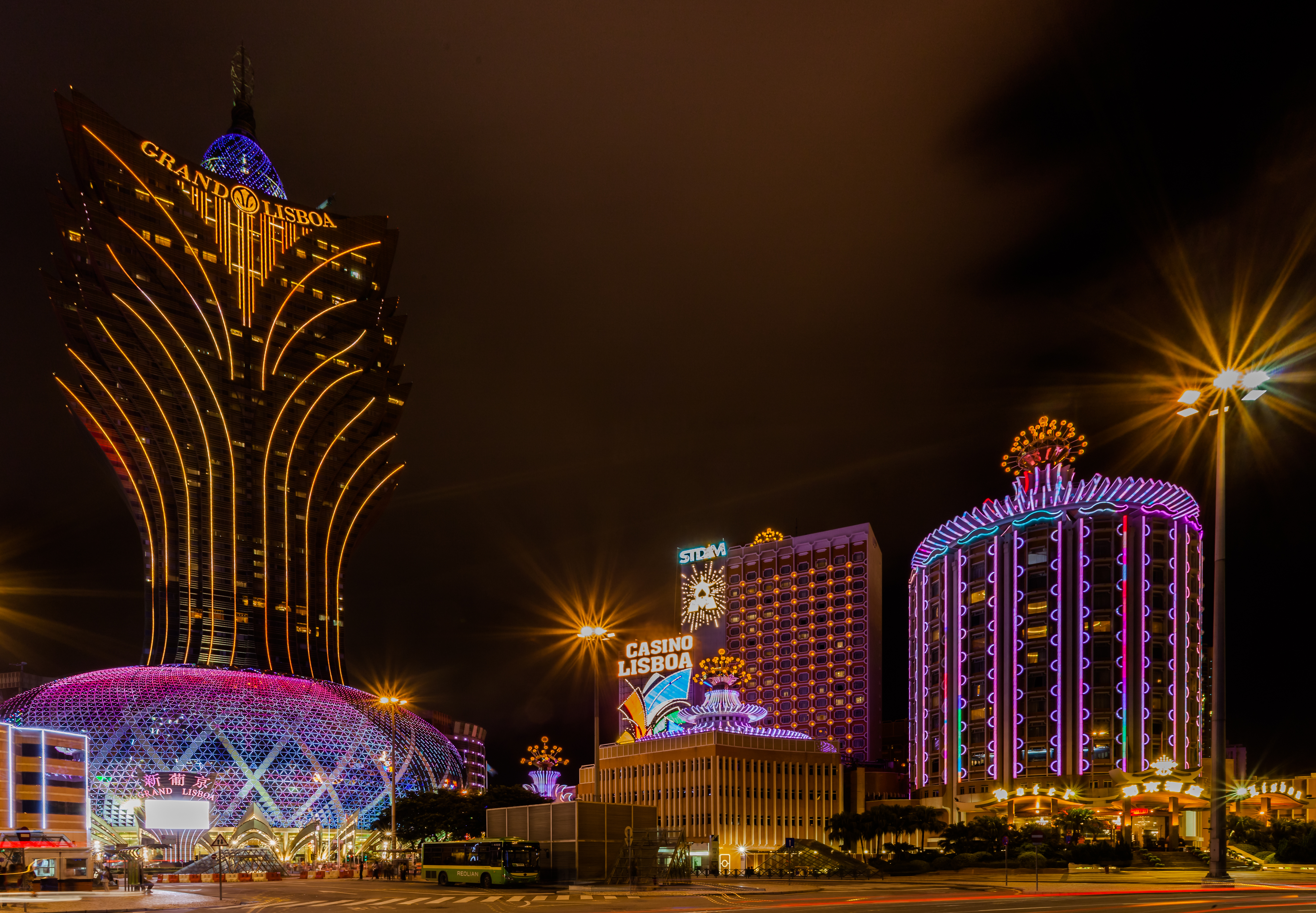
Cluster of casinos in Macau.

Within the region of Macau, there is a total of 50 Casinos spread across the cities of Macau, Cotai and Taipa. Being known as the ‘Las Vegas of China’, Macau has a substantial amount of casinos compared to other regions, with 30 in the city of Macau, 14 in Cotai and 6 in Taipa. An example of a famous Casino in Macau is the ‘MGM MACAU’, which stands at 154 metres (505 ft) tall and is located near the southern coast of the northern region of Macau. Other casinos in Macau include the Grand Lisboa Casino & Hotel, Wynn Casino Macau and Sands Macao Hotel, all of which are clustered around each other and near the MGM MACAU. This architectural cluster centralises the casinos near the southern coast of Macau, creating a ‘hub’ for gambling and accommodation.

== Tall buildings in Macau ==
Within the region of Macau, there are 20 completed buildings and 2 under construction that are above 150 metres (490 ft) tall, which ranks Macau as #48 in the world by number of buildings over 150 metres. Macau's first building over 150m was the Bank of China, which is located in the City of Macau and currently stands at 163m (535 feet) tall.

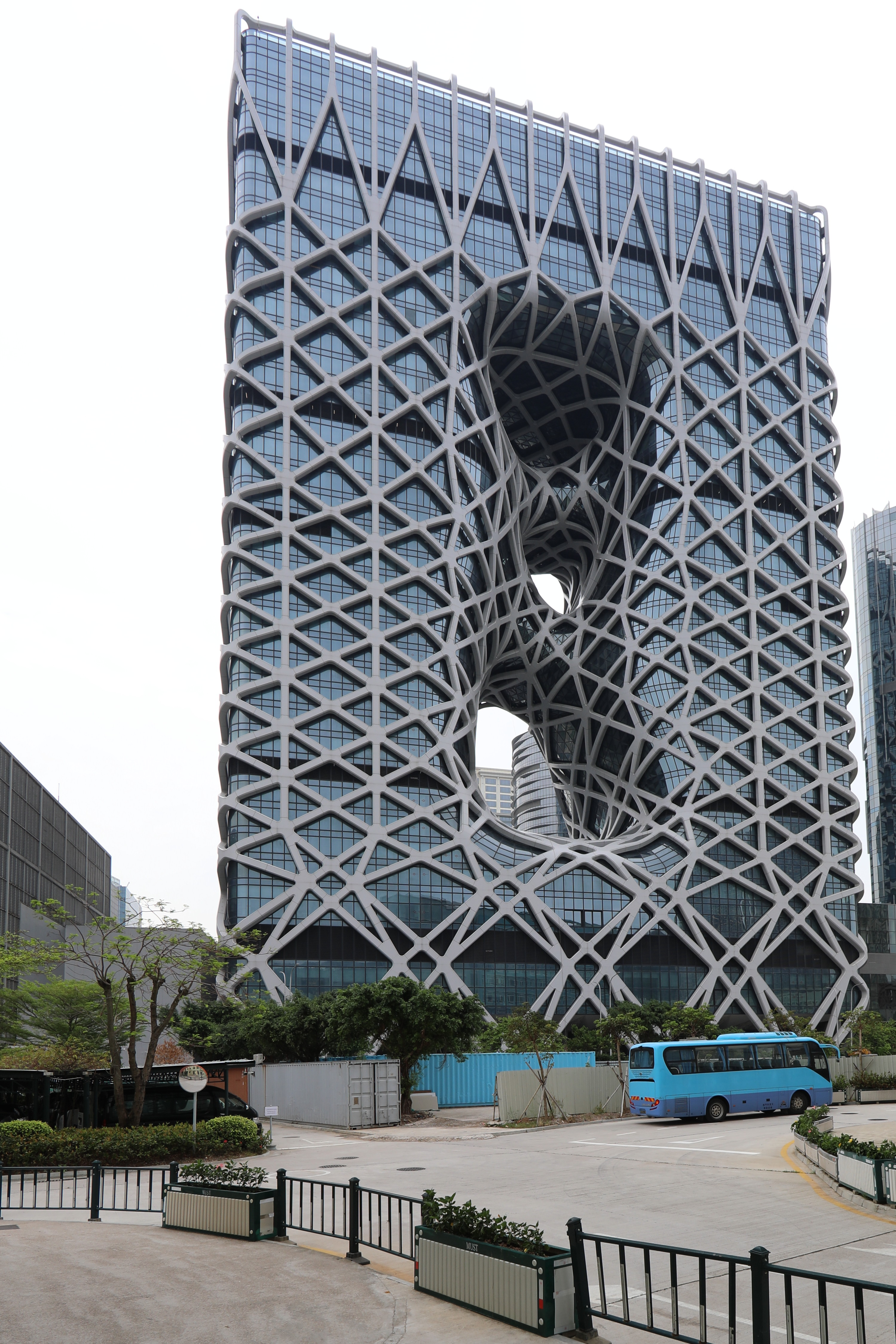
Morpheus Building, Macau.

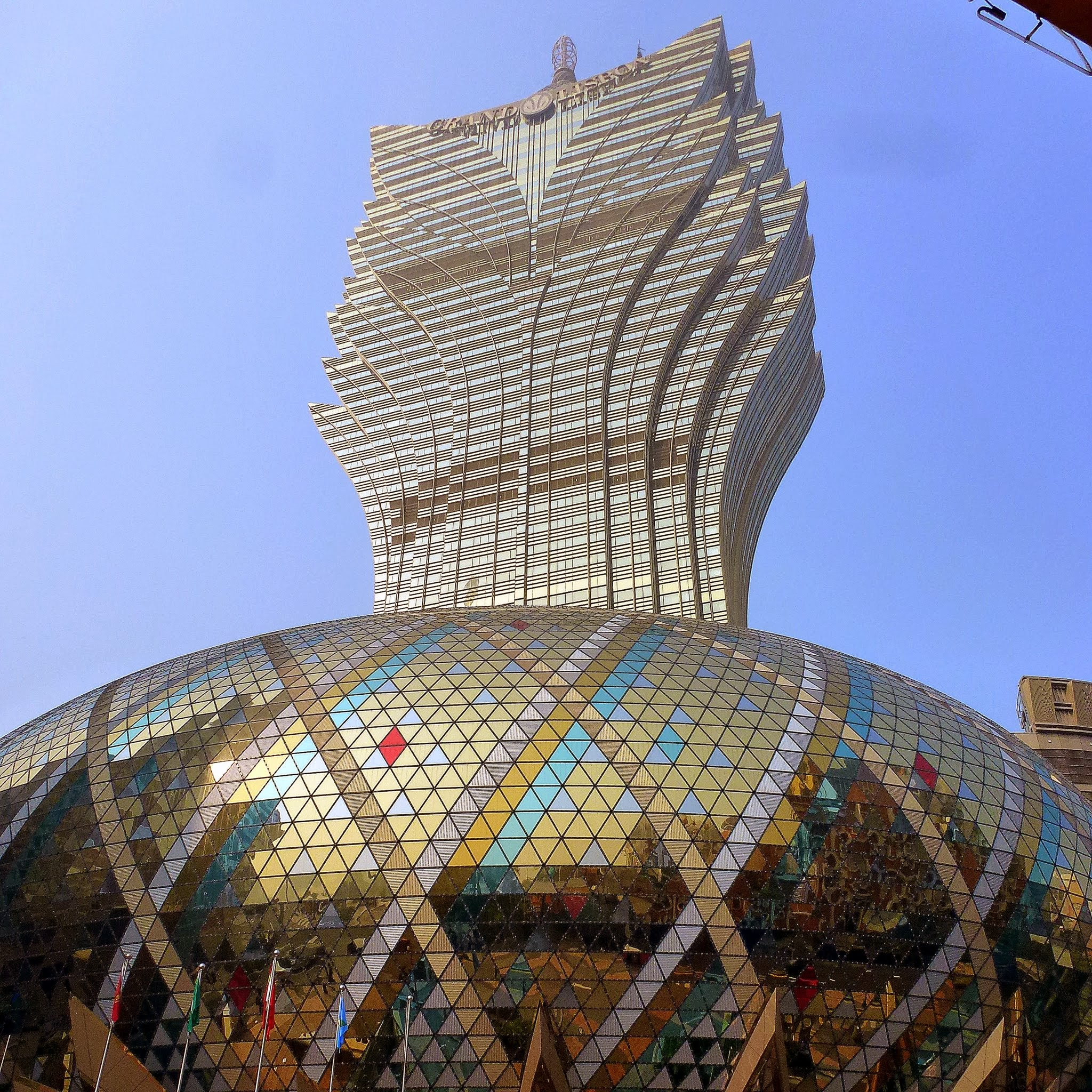
Grand Lisboa, Macau.

The tallest completed building in Macau is the Grand Lisboa Casino & Hotel, with an architectural height to the tip of 258m (846 feet) and a residential height of 197.7m (649 feet). These statistics rank the height of the building as #332 in the world. The building began construction in 2003 and was completed in 2008. Functioning as a hotel/casino and made from predominately steel, concrete and glass, it was designed by architectural company "Dennis Lau & Ng Chun Man Architects & Engineers (HK) Ltd. (DLN)" as their 9th tallest building. The Grand Lisboa has 48 floors above ground and 4 below, with 433 hotel rooms and 338 parking spots.

Macau's most recently constructed tall building, finished in 2018, is the Morpheus building, which is a multi story building that stands at 155.2m (509 feet) tall with 40 floors above ground and 770 hotel rooms. Architecturally, the Morpheus is unconventionally constructed with an exoskeleton design and 3 separate openings that travel through the middle of the building. The building was designed by the late architect Dame Zaha Hadid and was developed by Melco Crown Entertainment Limited.

Within the table below, is a list of the top 20 tallest completed buildings in Macau ranked upon structural height. The amount of floors only includes above ground floors.

Top 20 Tallest Buildings in Macau
Rank	Building Name	Floors	Height (m)	Year
1	Grand Lisboa	48	258	2008
2	L'Arc Macau	53	217	2009
3	Encore at Wynn Macau	40	206	2010
4	The Praia Block 1	56	185	2009
5	The Praia Block 2	56	185	2008
6	The Praia Block 3	56	185	2008
7	The Praia Block 4	56	185	2008
8	Mandarin Oriental Macau	42	165	2010
9	Bank of China Building	38	163	1991
10	The Buckingham	50	160	2009
11	Galaxy Macau Phase II	36	160	2015
12	Altira Macau	32	160	2007
13	Lai San Kok	52	156	2008
14	Morpheus	40	155	2018
15	MGM Grand Macau	35	154	2007
16	Studio City	32	152	2015
17	The Venetian Macau	39	151	2007
18	MGM Grand Paradise	36	151	2018
19	Crown Towers	36	151	2009
20	Galaxy StarWorld Hotel	33	148	2006

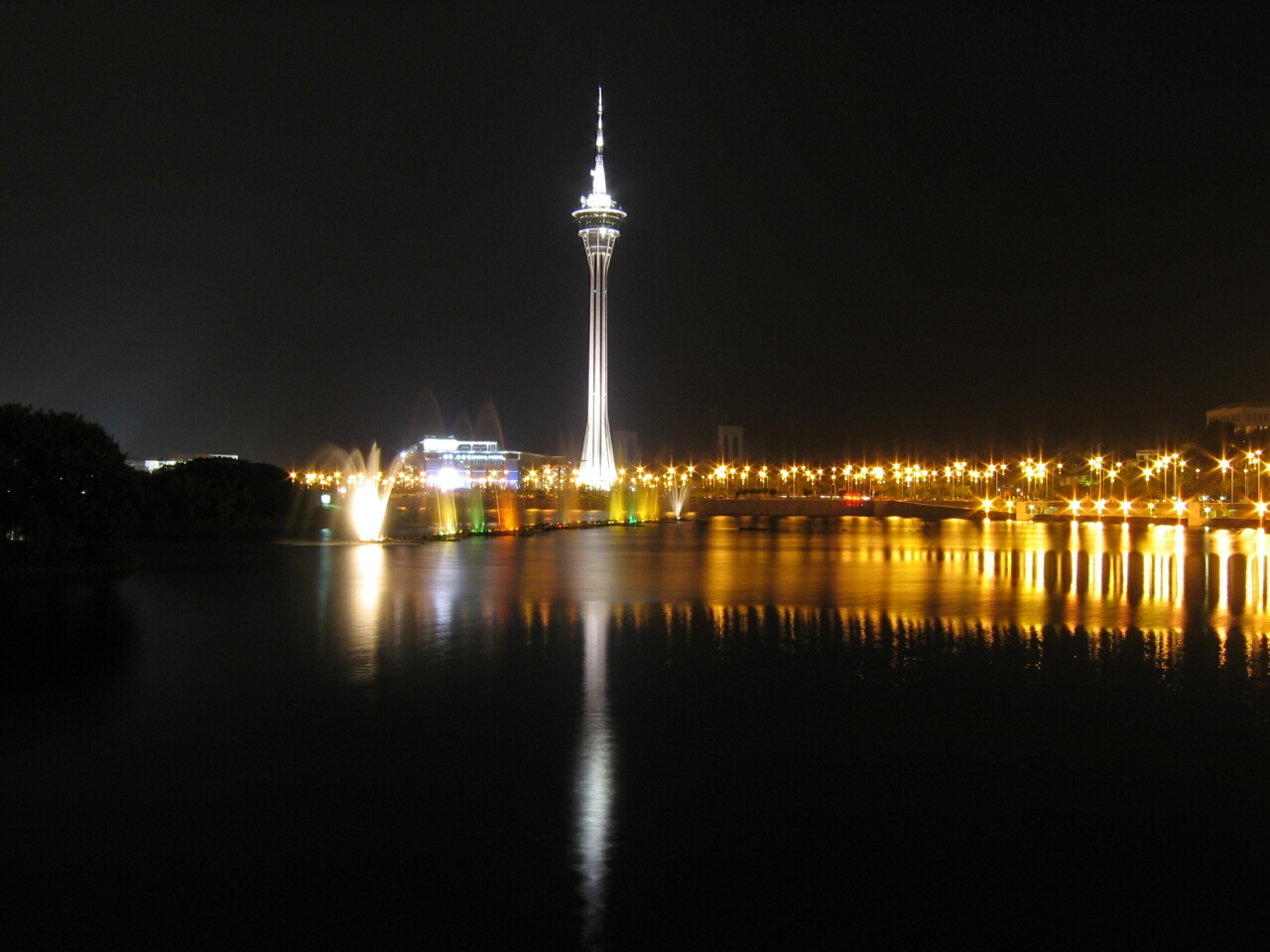
Macau Tower at night.

Technically the tallest structure in Macau, however not classified under the same category as the tallest buildings in Macau, the Macau Tower (pictured below) is 338 metres (1,109 ft) tall to the tip. The tower began construction in 1998 and was opened on 19 December 2001. It was designed by architect, Gordon Moller and was inspired by the Sky Tower in Auckland, New Zealand. It currently holds the Guinness World Record for the highest commercial bungy jump point at 233 metres (764 ft) and the first person to jump was film star Edison Chen (China) in 2006.

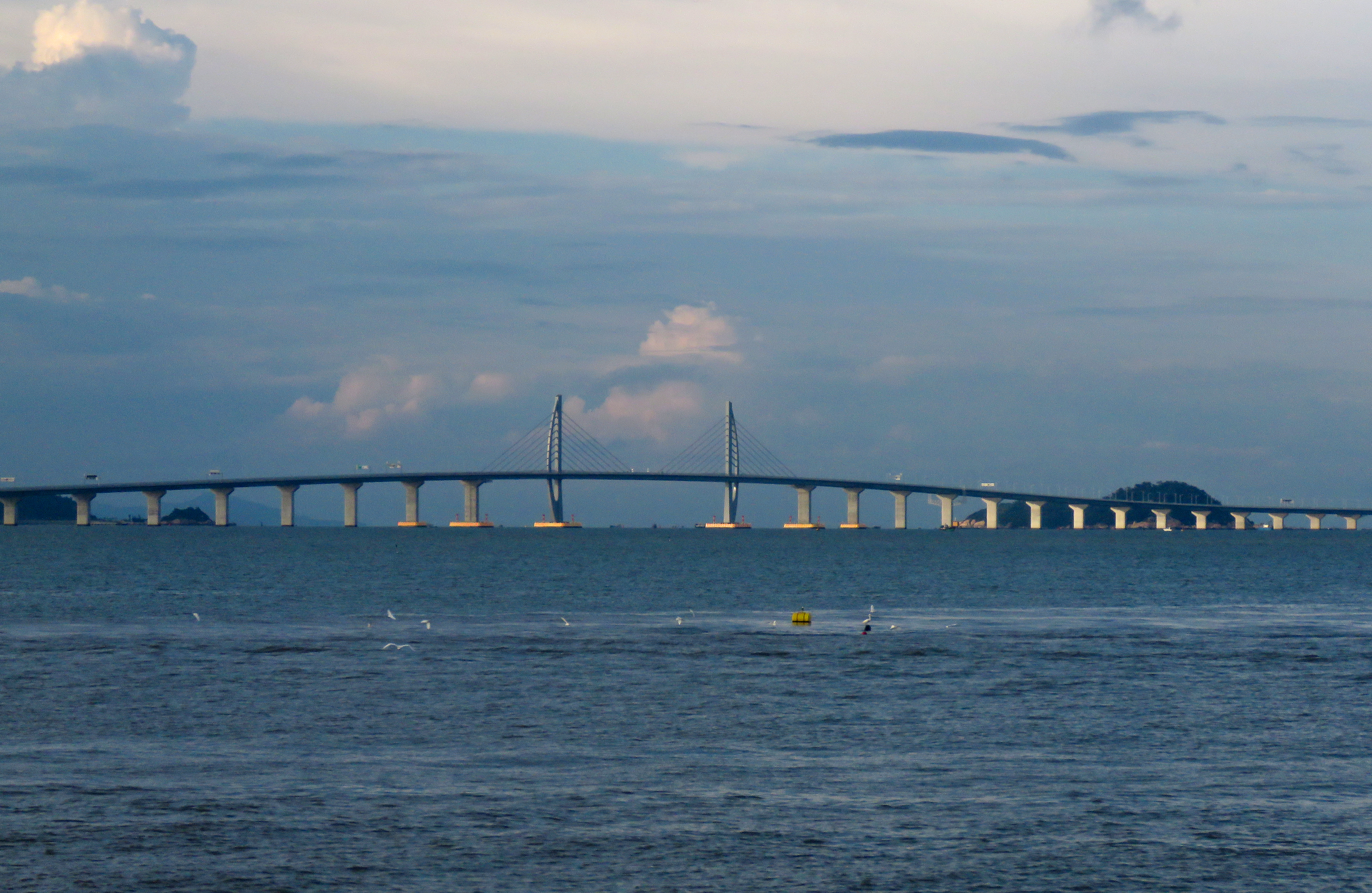
West section of the Zhuhai Bridge.

== Bridges and tunnels ==
The Zhuhai Bridge, opened in October 2018, is the world's longest sea bridge, spanning 55 kilometres (34 miles) from Hong Kong to Macau and Mainland Chinese city; Zhuhai. The bridge cost approximately $20 Billion US Dollars to complete and was under construction from December 2009. The bridge is designed to last over 120 years, withstanding pressures from earthquakes and typhoons. Through employing 400,000 tonnes of steel in its construction, with 30 kilometres (19 mi) worth of bridge above the Pearl River Delta and 7 kilometres (4.3 mi) worth of tunnel running between two artificial islands. The bridge is 3 lanes wide on each side and incorporates merging channels to transfer the traffic from the left to the right as it is technically in Chinese territory. To use the bridge, drivers from Hong Kong will need to attain special permits, of which there are only 300.

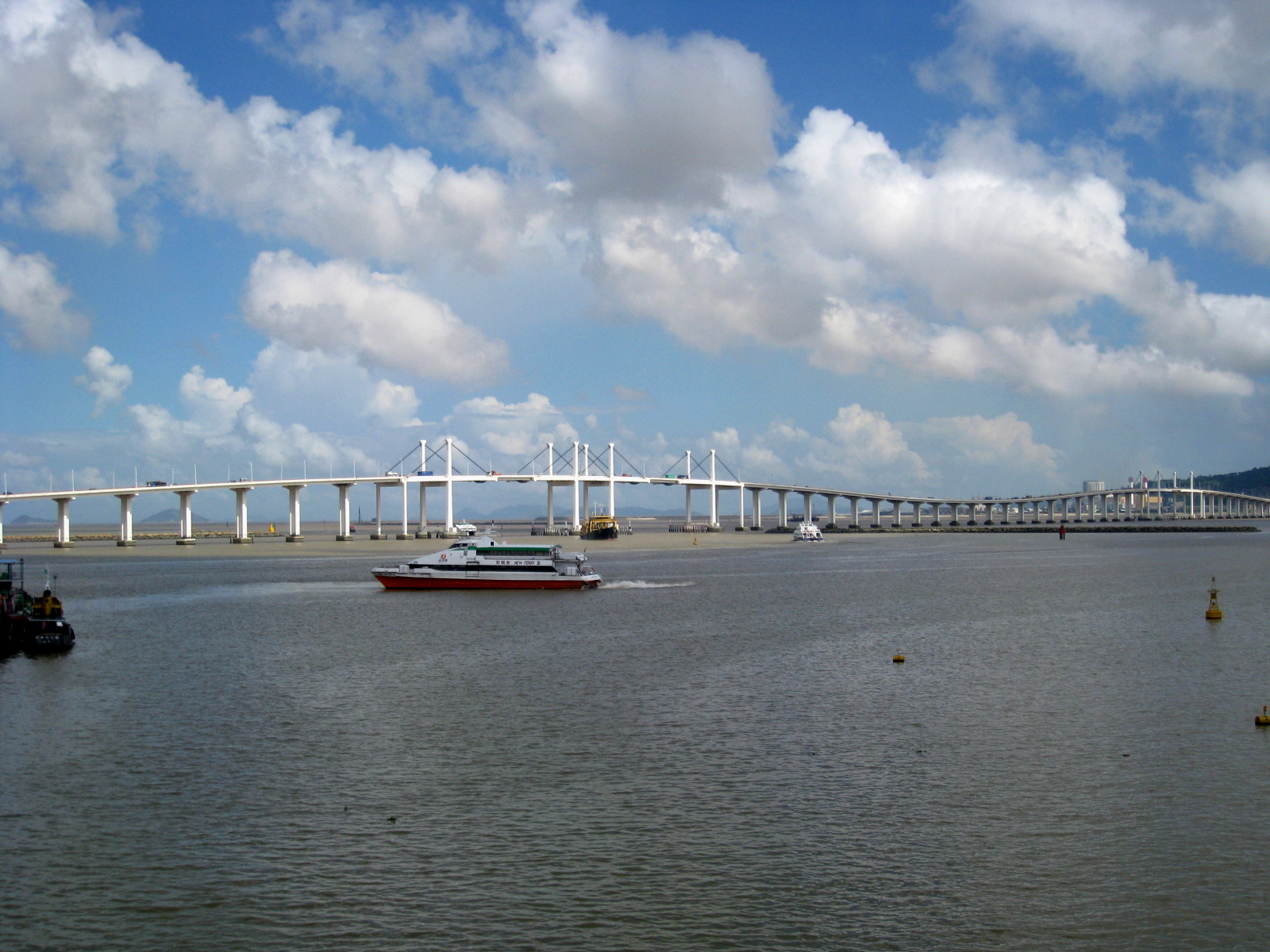
Ponte da Amizade.

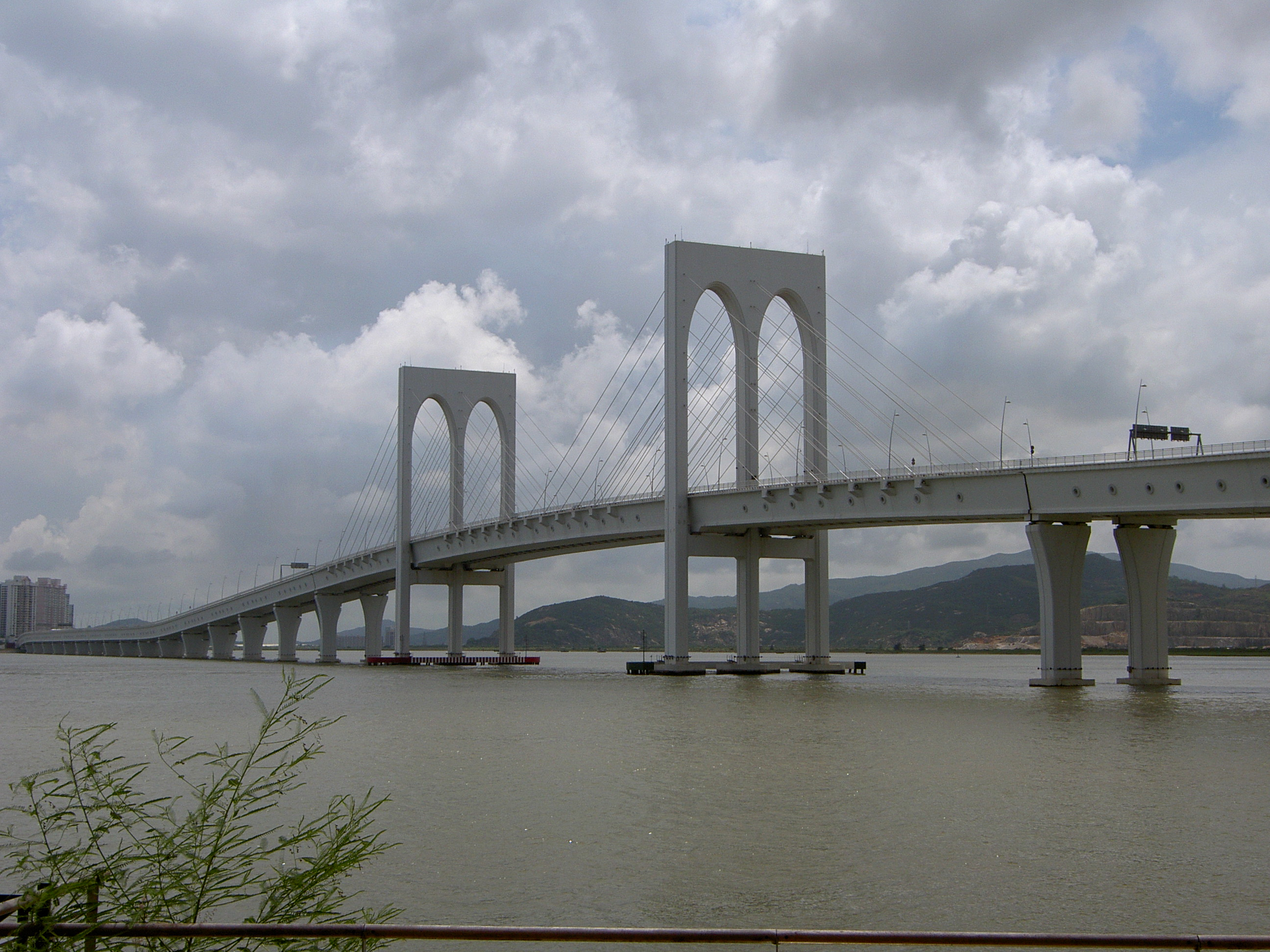
Sai Van Bridge.

Ponte da Amizade, which is Portuguese for the ‘friendship bridge’, connects the Macau Peninsula to Taipa Island and Pac On. With its construction beginning in June 1990, the bridge took almost 4 years to complete and was officially opened to motor vehicles in March 1994. The bridge spans over 4.7 kilometres (2.9 mi), with a maximum height of 30 metres (98 ft) above the sea and is 18 metres (59 ft) wide at its widest point, accommodating four lanes of traffic. The bridge has two crests at different points to allow for sea traffic to travel beneath. The Sai Van Bridge, completed in December 2004, is also a sea bridge used to connect the Macau Peninsula and Taipa Island. The full length of the bridge is 2.2 kilometres (1.4 mi) long, with its pylon heights standing 85 metres (279 ft) above ground level. The bridge was designed by Pengest Planeamento to accommodate both road traffic and railway carriages and is built primarily from steel, steel cables and prestressed concrete. The total cost of the bridge was US$70 million.

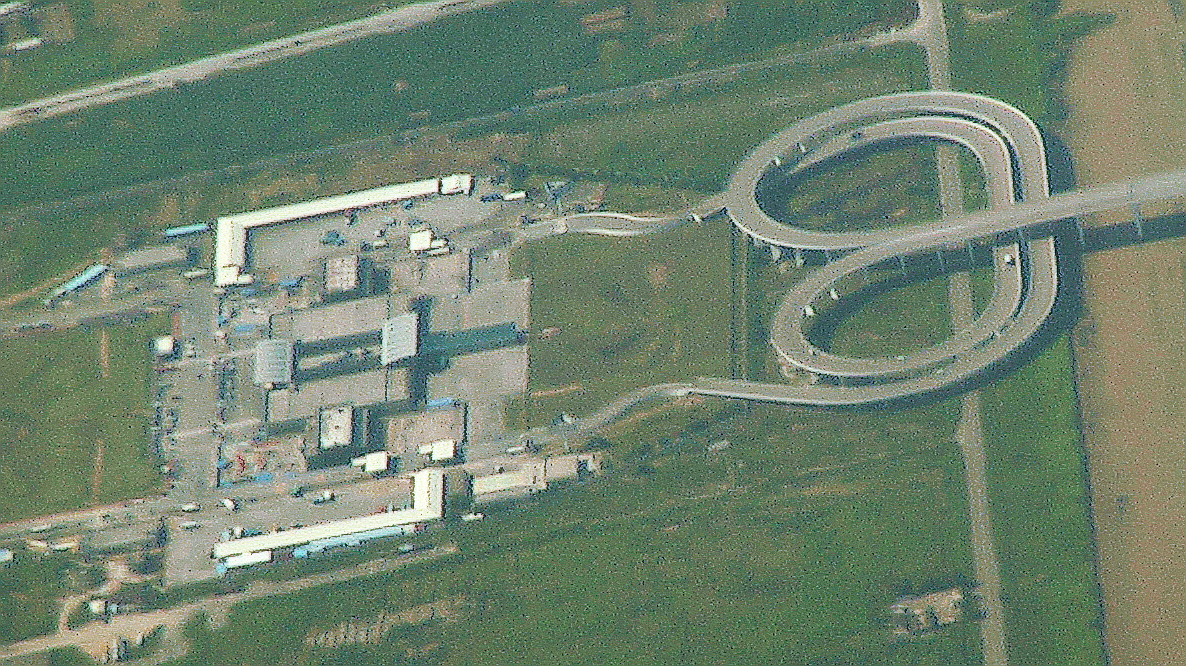
Lotus Bridge.

The smallest bridge in Macau, linking it across the border to Hengquin Island in Zhuhai, is the Lotus Bridge. The bridge is approximately 900 metres (0.56 mi) long and its construction was completed in 1999. It specifically links the Cotai reclamation area of Macau to Hengquin Island with 3 lanes either side of the bridge. The bridge cost US$25 million to construct, which was shared between the Macau and Chinese governments. The Lotus Bridge uses an ‘asymmetric partial cloverleaf’ design, which is designed to re-direct traffic onto the correct side of the road when entering their respective countries, with China being the right and Macau being the left.

== Historic architecture ==
Most of the historic architecture and landmarks within Macau are situated in the Historic Centre of Macau, which is listed as a UNESCO World Heritage Site. As seen within the table below, there are over 20 buildings and landmarks within the Historic Centre, however in terms of historic architecture, there are a bit less than 20. Some of the architecture within the Historic Centre includes the Holy House of Mercy, Mandarin's House and the A-Ma Temple. As the Historic Centre of Macau is host to both buildings and landmarks, below is a list of the historic architecture, in no particular order, with the name and year constructed included.

Historic Architecture in Macau
Name	Year
The Ruins of St. Paul's Cathedral	1640
Na Tcha Temple	1888
Section of the Old City Walls	1569
A-Ma Temple	1488
Mandarin's House Macau	1869
St. Lawrence's Church	1560
Fortaleza do Monte (Mount Fortress)	1617
Holy House of Mercy	1569
St. Joseph's Seminary and Church	1758
St. Augustine's Church	1587
Sir Robert Ho-Tung Library	1894
Dom Pedro V Theatre	1860
Moorish Barracks	1874
Lou Kau Mansion	1889
Leal Senado Building	1784
Guia Fortress	1638

The Holy House of Mercy is a UNESCO World Heritage Site, constructed in 1569 and situated within the Historic Centre of Macau, in the Senado Square. The building was designed and constructed by D. Belchior Carneiro, following a neo-classical architectural trend through incorporating 14 arches on the face and stands 2 stories high. It served as a medical clinic for some time, later becoming an orphanage. It is the oldest social solidarity institution in the Macau Special Administrative Region and has undergone multiple renovations, with the most recent in 2003 on the building's Rehabilitation Centre for the Blind.

One of the oldest structures in and officially the oldest temple in Macau, the A-Ma Temple was built in 1488 on the southwest Macau Peninsula. It is made up of six separate architectural components within the entire vicinity, primarily using stone, bricks and granite to build the temple. Pictured below, a notable aspect of the temple is the Gate Pavilion, which measures to be 4.5 metres wide and is made entirely from granite.

The Mandarin's House, built in 1869 and located at No. 10 Travessa de António da Silva, is a traditional Chinese styled compound that once housed Chinese Literary personality Zhen g Guanying. The compound covers approximately 4,000 square metres of land and it encompasses architectural elements of Art Deco as well as traditional Chinese styling with Western influence. In 2001 the Government took over the complex from its private owners and in 2005 it became a UNESCO World Heritage Site
