= Macau Bridge =

Bridge in Macau

Coordinates: 22.1810°N 113.5732°E

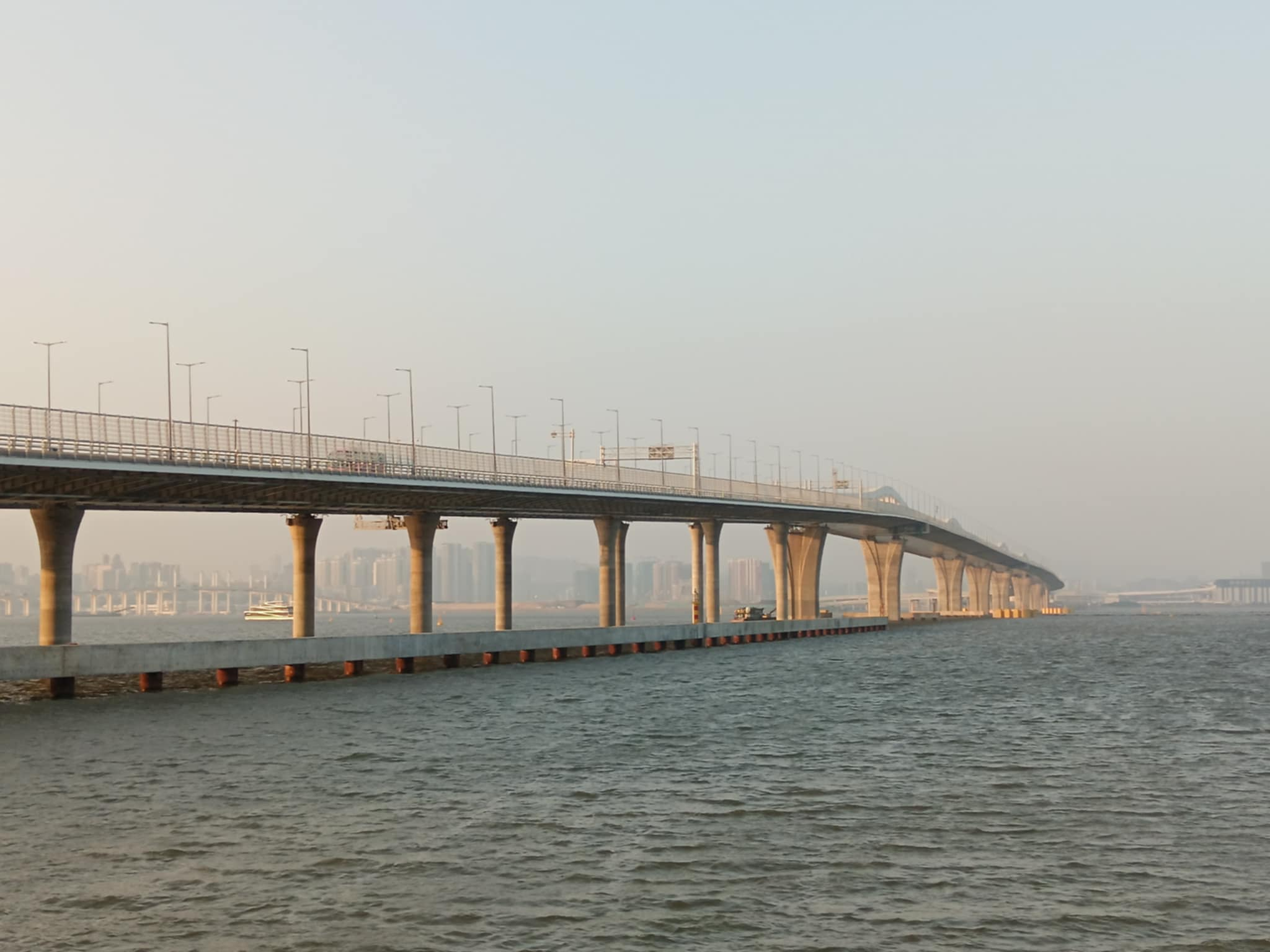
Macau Bridge in 2024

Macau Bridge (Chinese: 澳門橋, Portuguese: Ponte Macau) is a cable-stayed bridge located in Macau. The bridge opened on October 1, 2024. It measures 3 kilometres (1.8 miles) long and is the fourth bridge crossing in Macau. It connects Pac On to the HZMB-Bridge Port in Macau. The bridge features a dedicated lane for motorcyclists.
