= Macanese =

Macanese, of or from Macau, may refer to:

- Macanese people, a mixed ethnic group from Macau
- Macanese Patois, a Portuguese-based creole language
- Macanese cuisine, a term mainly refers to the creole Portuguese cuisine of Macau
- Macau people, people of Macau generally
- Culture of Macau or Macanese culture
