= Sai Van Bridge =

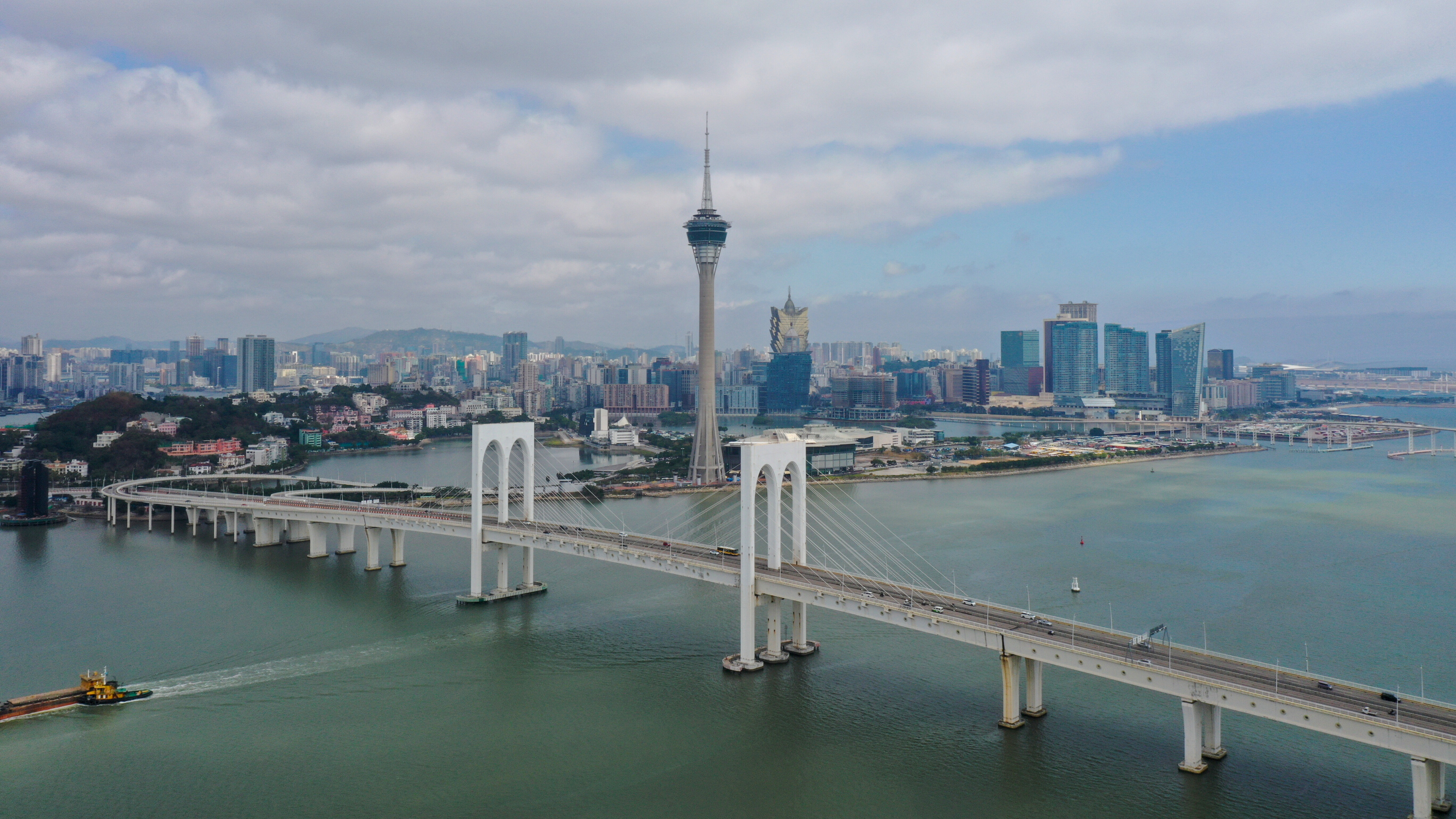
- Coordinates: 22°10′20″N 113°32′10″E
- Carries: 6 lanes of roadway (upper), 2 Macau LRT rail tracks (lower)
- Crosses: Praia Grande Bay
- Locale: Macau Peninsula and Taipa
- Official name: Ponte de Sai Van

Characteristics
- Design: Cable-stayed bridge
- Total length: 2,200 metres (7,218 ft)
- Width: 28 metres (92 ft)
- Longest span: 180 metres (591 ft)

History
- Opened: 19 December 2004

Statistics
- Daily traffic: cars
- Toll: free

Location
- Interactive map of Sai Van Bridge

Sai Van Bridge

Chinese name
- Traditional Chinese: 西灣大橋
- Simplified Chinese: 西湾大桥
- Literal meaning: west bay bridge
Transcriptions
Standard Mandarin
- Hanyu Pinyin: Xīwān Dàqiáo
Yue: Cantonese
- Jyutping: sai1 waan1 daai6 kiu4

Portuguese name
- Portuguese: Ponte de Sai Van

The Sai Van Bridge (Chinese: 西灣大橋, Portuguese: Ponte de Sai Van) is a cable-stayed bridge located in Macau. Inaugurated on 19 December 2004, the bridge measures 2.2 kilometers (1.4 mi) long and is the third one to cross the Praia Grande Bay connecting Taipa Island and Macau Peninsula on Hsiang-shan Island. It features a double-deck design, with an enclosed lower deck to be used in the event of strong typhoons when the other three bridges connecting Taipa and Macau Peninsula, both of which are single-deck, namely Ponte Governador Nobre de Carvalho and Ponte de Amizade, are closed. It is the world's first prestressed concrete double-deck main beam cable-stayed bridge and the world's largest-span double-deck concrete bridge. The lower deck of the bridge also carries the Macau Light Transit System, which started revenue operation on 8 December 2023.

== See also ==
- Transport in Macau
