= Culture of Macau =

Macau is an autonomous territory within China. A Portuguese colony until 1999, Macau has a diverse culture firmly rooted in Cantonese culture, with a mix of influences from East Asia and Western Europe. Macau is known for being the largest gambling center in the world.

== People and languages ==
Most commonly used daily languages
Cantonese	80.01%
Mandarin	5.5%
Tagalog	3.0%
Portuguese	0.6%
English	2.8%
From the 2016 census result.

The two official languages of Macau are Chinese and Portuguese, although the latter is only spoken by a small minority. English is also widely spoken. As of 2016, 80.1% of the population speak Cantonese as their daily language.

In 2018, Reuters stated "there are signs that Chinese is being prioritized in government."

The Macanese language, generally known as Patuá, is a distinctive creole that is still spoken by several dozen members of the Macanese people, an ethnic group of mixed Asian and Portuguese ancestry that accounts for a small percentage of Macau's population.

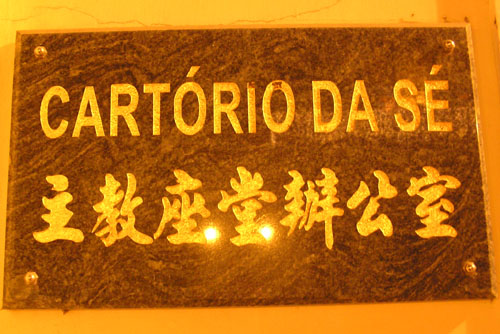
A sign in both Chinese and Portuguese in Macau - "主教座堂辦公室" (in Chinese) and "Cartório da Sé" (in Portuguese), which means "Office of the Cathedral."

Signs in Macau are displayed in both Traditional Chinese and Portuguese. In contrast to mainland China, Macau—along with Hong Kong and Taiwan—generally does not use Simplified Chinese characters.

Among the main migrants of the country are workers from the Philippines, hence Tagalog is one of the most-heard foreign languages.

=== Cultural identity ===
The worldwide popularity of Cantonese food and Chinese martial arts (kung fu or wushu) has made them popular in Portugal as well.

In 1998, the first Festival da Lusofonia took place in Macau, a festival of Portuguese-speaking communities. In November 2013, the 16th edition of the festival took place over the duration of two and a half days with musical activities, kids programmes, traditional Portuguese games and food from Portuguese-speaking countries' cuisines.

=== Mass media ===
Most of the pop music that can be heard on the channel TDM Teledifusão de Macau (澳廣視) is imported from Hong Kong or overseas (mainly Japan). However, more and more local songs are being recorded by locals. Some Brazilian TV stations are also broadcast in Macau.

== Cuisine ==
Macanese cuisine is a blend of southern Chinese (especially Cantonese cuisine) and Portuguese cuisines, with significant influences from Southeast Asia and the Lusophone world. The most famous snack is the Portuguese-style egg tart. It is widely popular in Southeast Asia, especially in Taiwan and Hong Kong. The most famous Macanese food is galinha à portuguesa, which is served in numerous varieties in Macau restaurants.

In 2018 Reuters stated that the cuisine was one of the few remaining Portuguese influences in Macau.

== Religion ==
The primary religion is Buddhism. Roman Catholicism has considerable influence in education and social welfare in Macau. However, adherents only count for about six percent of the population. Protestantism is spreading quickly, especially among the younger demographic groups.

== Arts ==
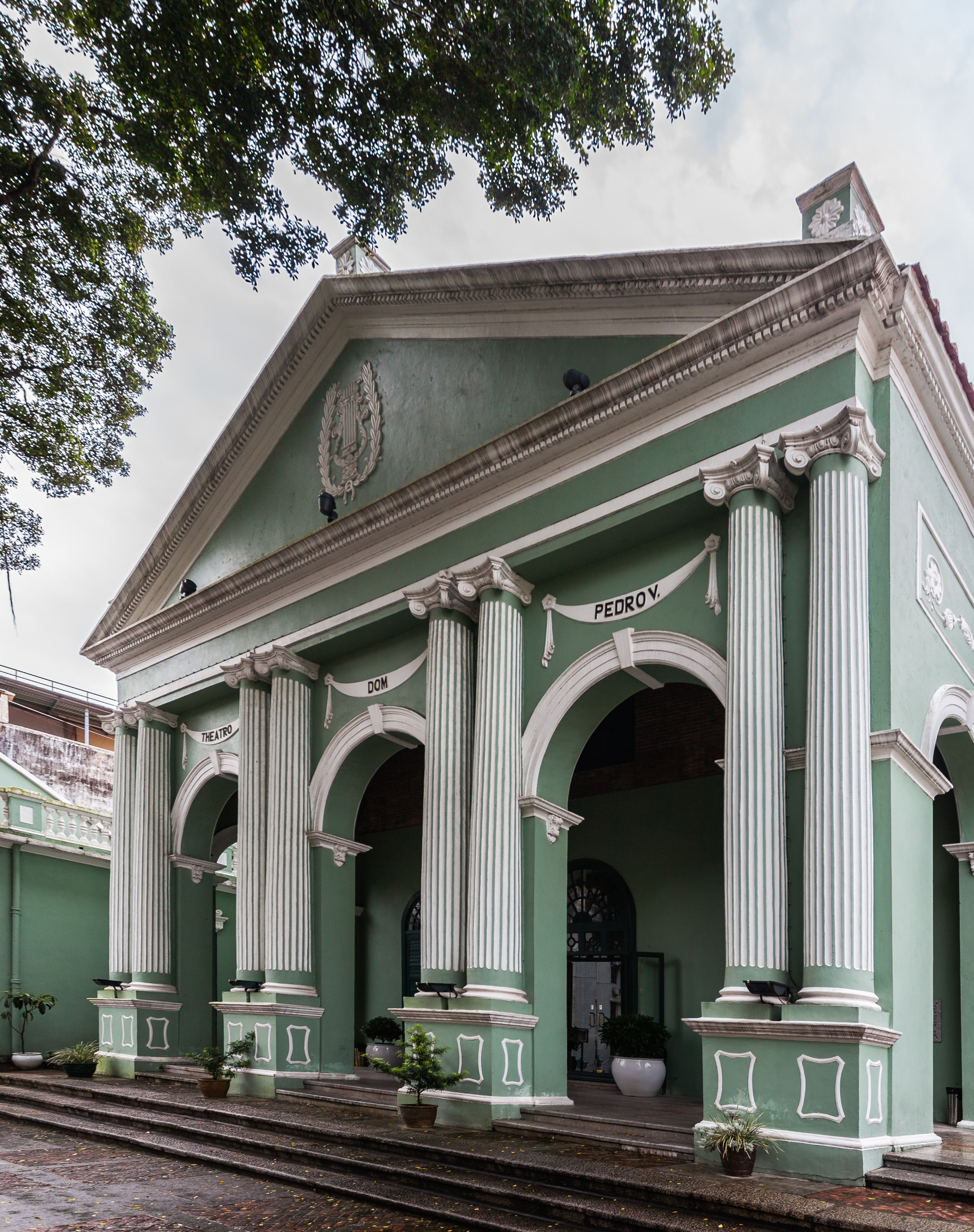
Dom Pedro V theatre

=== Film ===
A few independent films have been produced since the late 1990s. Recent Macau film productions include:

- 窗前熗後 by Vincent Hui (2000)
- Love Is Not A Sin (鍾意無罪) by Doug Chan (2003). Winner of Golden DV Award (27th HKIFF), Winner of The Best Original Screenplay Award (1st Downunder International Film Festival, Darwin).
- macau.xmas.2005 (澳門.聖誕.2005) by Sio (2005).
- Macao 2525 (2021). Nominated for best digital animation at the Film & TV World Cup 2021 at the Lima Web Fest in Peru.
- The Edge Of Human by Johan Karlberg and Angela Lao (2022). First Macanese Cyberpunk movie, nominated for best experimental film at the Film & TV World Cup 2022 Pinewood Studios Lift Off Sessions in London UK. Finished 4th place of 42 in the network round.
- Return To Earth - Macau Sci-fi (2023) by Johan Karlberg and Angela Lao. Finished Top 4 of 15 nominated finalists at BCT Cinema E Televisione festival in Italy (best feature film);. declared the best Asian feature film in the festival.

=== Music ===
The Macau International Music Festival is conducted by the Cultural Affairs Bureau of the Macau SAR Government every autumn. The 20th anniversary of the MIMF was celebrated in 2007 with performances of Jazz, classical music, electronica, Chinese folk-pop, rock and Fado.

Other Lusophone music types popular in Macao are samba, bossa nova, and kizomba.

In 2005, the Hush!! Full Band Festival got established, a government-sponsored modern music festival featuring pop rock and hard rock bands from all over Asia with a focus on Macau bands. The festival is free of charge and it's in its 9th edition in 2013.

=== Literature ===
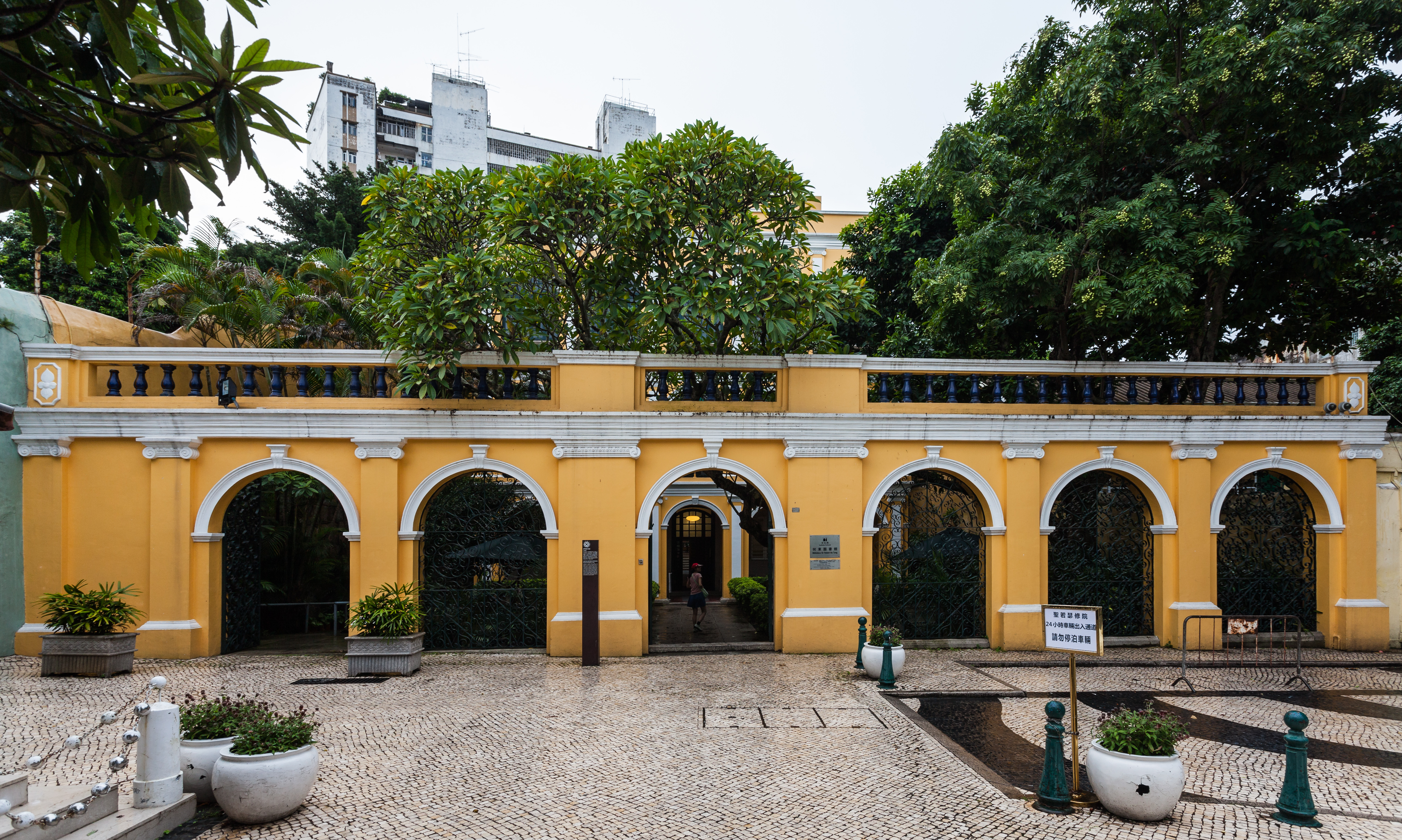
Robert Ho Tung library in Macau.

The literature of Macanese (i.e. those with Portuguese descent) is a multi-dimensional art. Their literature appeared as early as the 19th century. At the beginning of the 20th century, a group of well-known writers appeared:

- Anthology "Lonely Road": TancareiraBela, Tancareira Pensativa and CancāoDe Tancareira by Leanel Alves.
- Anthology "Blessed Garden, Macau" by Jose dos Santos Ferreira.
- Short fiction "The Gown" by Deolinda de Conceição
- Long fiction: "Love and small toes" & "The Bewitching Braid" written by Henrique de Senna Fernandes
- Anthology "Four Seasons in One Day" – Carlos Marreiros
- Other:
  - "Chinese Urheen" by Camilo Pessanha (1867–1926)
  - "The Chart of Maritime Countries (海國圖志)", "Listens to the Dulcimer & Song playing by a foreign lady in the Macau Garden (澳门花园听夷女洋琴歌)" written by Wei Yuan (魏源 1794–1857), displayed his personal feeling and understanding of classical music.

=== Cantonese opera ===
Cantonese opera is quite popular, especially among elderly residents. In 2003, the Cultural Institute of the Macau S.A.R Government, in collaboration with the Leisure and Cultural Services Department of the Hong Kong SAR, organized the exhibition "Fong Yim Fun – The Life and Work of a Cantonese Opera Artiste". As a well-known actress and opera artiste in Guangdong, Hong Kong, and Macau, Fong Yim Fun performed in more than 150 operas and films. Part of her works was exhibited in the Macao Museum at that time.

=== Facilities ===
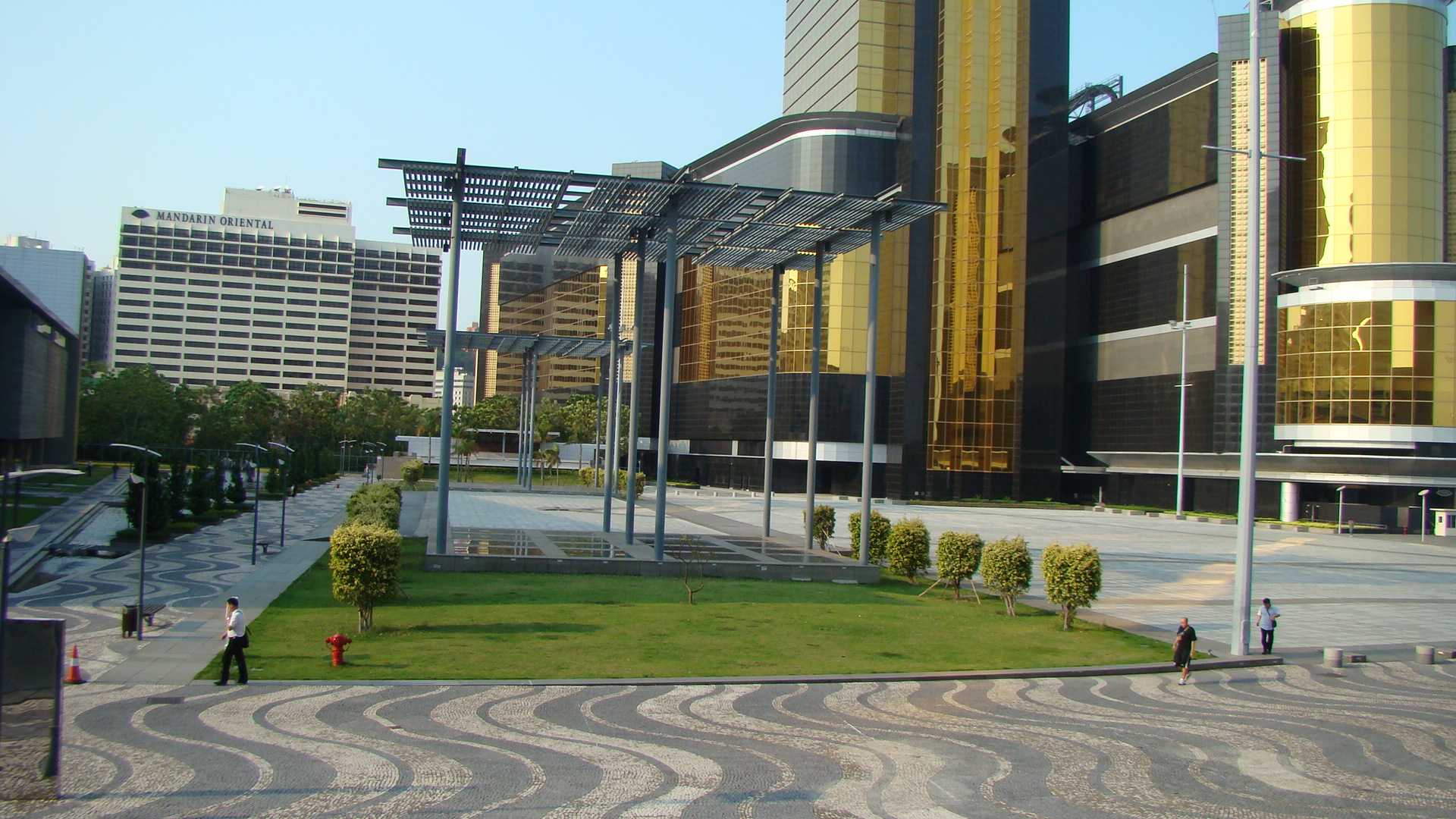
The Plaza of Cultural Centre

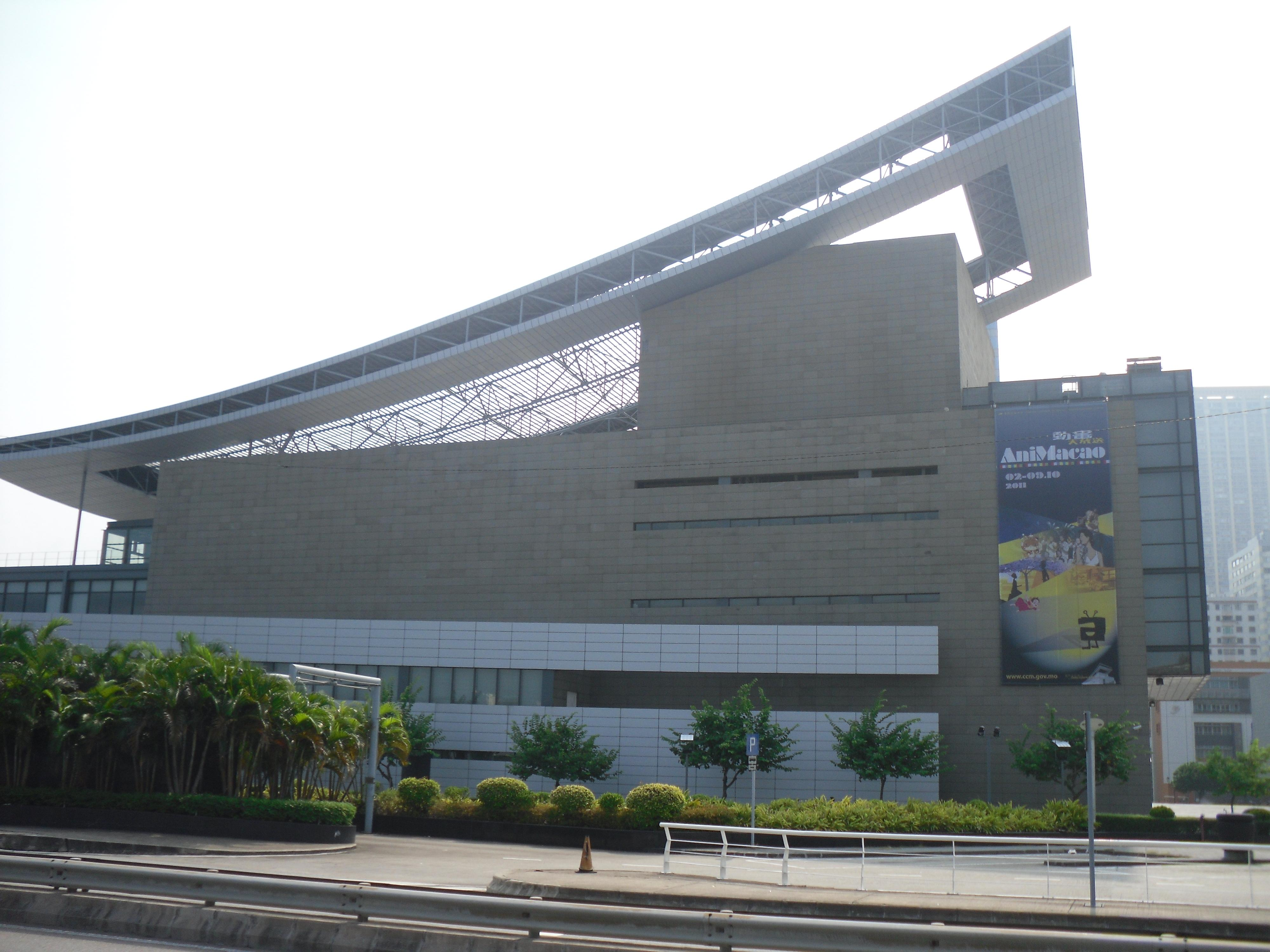
Macao Cultural Centre

The Macao Cultural Centre was established in 1999, for the purpose of offering unique venues for artistic events, international conferences and exhibitions, enhancing cultural exchange, and helping to expand culture horizons among Macau residents. Hundreds of programs and events take place there almost every day—e.g., martial arts performances, European traditional music, Chinese traditional music, foreign music, varies types of dancing, etc.

The Macau Ricci Institute is a recent foundation of the Jesuits in Macau. Its aim is to continue the process of friendly encounters between Chinese and European cultures and traditions, which was begun by Matteo Ricci 1552–1610 many years ago.

== See also ==
- Architecture of Macau
- List of museums in Macau
- Lingnan culture
