= Praia Grande (Macau) =

Praia Grande Bay (Nam Van)
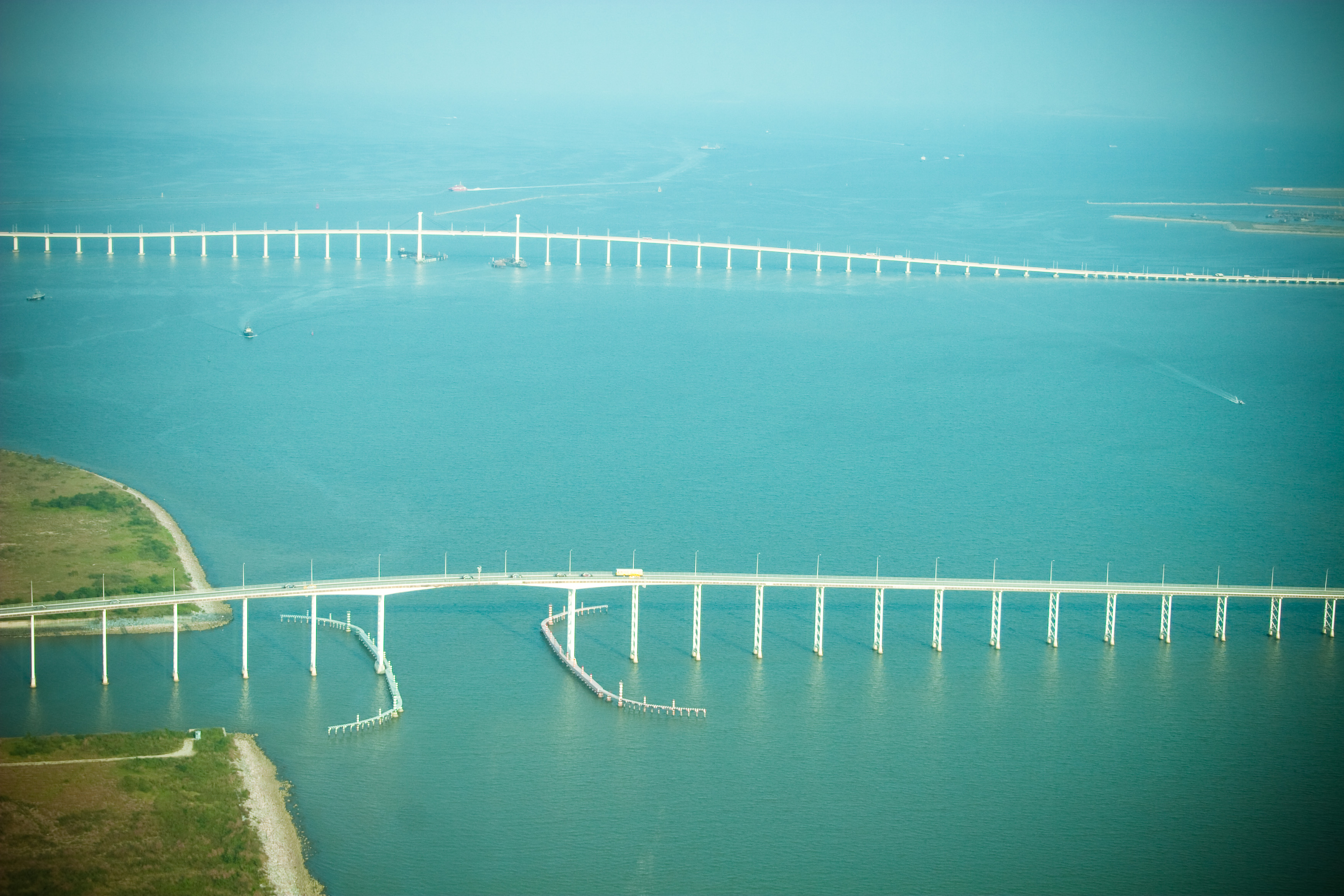

- Location within Macau
- Coordinates: 22°10′35″N 113°32′46″E
- Type: Bay
- River sources: Pearl River
- Ocean/sea sources: Pacific Ocean
- Basin countries: Macau
- Settlements: Macau; Zhuhai

Praia Grande
- Traditional Chinese: 大灣
- Simplified Chinese: 大湾
- Literal meaning: Large Bay
Transcriptions
Standard Mandarin
- Hanyu Pinyin: Dàwān
Yue: Cantonese
- Jyutping: daai6 waan1

Nam Van
- Traditional Chinese: 南灣
- Simplified Chinese: 南湾
- Literal meaning: South Bay
Transcriptions
Standard Mandarin
- Hanyu Pinyin: Nánwān
Yue: Cantonese
- Jyutping: naam4 waan4

Praia Grande Bay (Portuguese: Baía da Praia Grande, lit. 'large beach' or Chinese: 大灣; lit. 'large bay') or Nam Van (Chinese: 南灣; lit. 'south bay'), officially known as Ou Mun (Chinese: 澳門), is a bay in Macau. Located on the east side of the Macau Peninsula, it served as the chief promenade in Macau. It has been credited as probably the "most depicted view of 19th-century Macau", and its most characteristic landmark for many years. The bay was confined by the Fortress of St. Francis in the north-east and the Fortress of Bom Parto in the south-west. Only a few colonial buildings remain, and the landscape has been largely altered by land reclamation and high-rise buildings.

== History ==
In April 1869, Francisco Maria da Cunha released a plan to unify the development of Praia Grande and Praia do Bom Parto to create a promenade. In 1930s, the eastern part of Praia Grande underwent land reclamation which became the current location of Casino Lisboa. In 1940s, this area became one of the main residential areas for Macanese people. Up until 1950s, there was little urban development in the reclaimed lands. However, from 1960s to 1970s, many business offices started to move into this area, including numerous bank branches and leading commercial establishments. It was also the site of the governor's palace, the administrative offices and consulates.

The remaining parts of the bay was reclaimed in the 1990s to form the current man-made Nam Van Lake. Praia Grande is the current site of the annual Macau International Fireworks Display Contest.

== Gallery ==
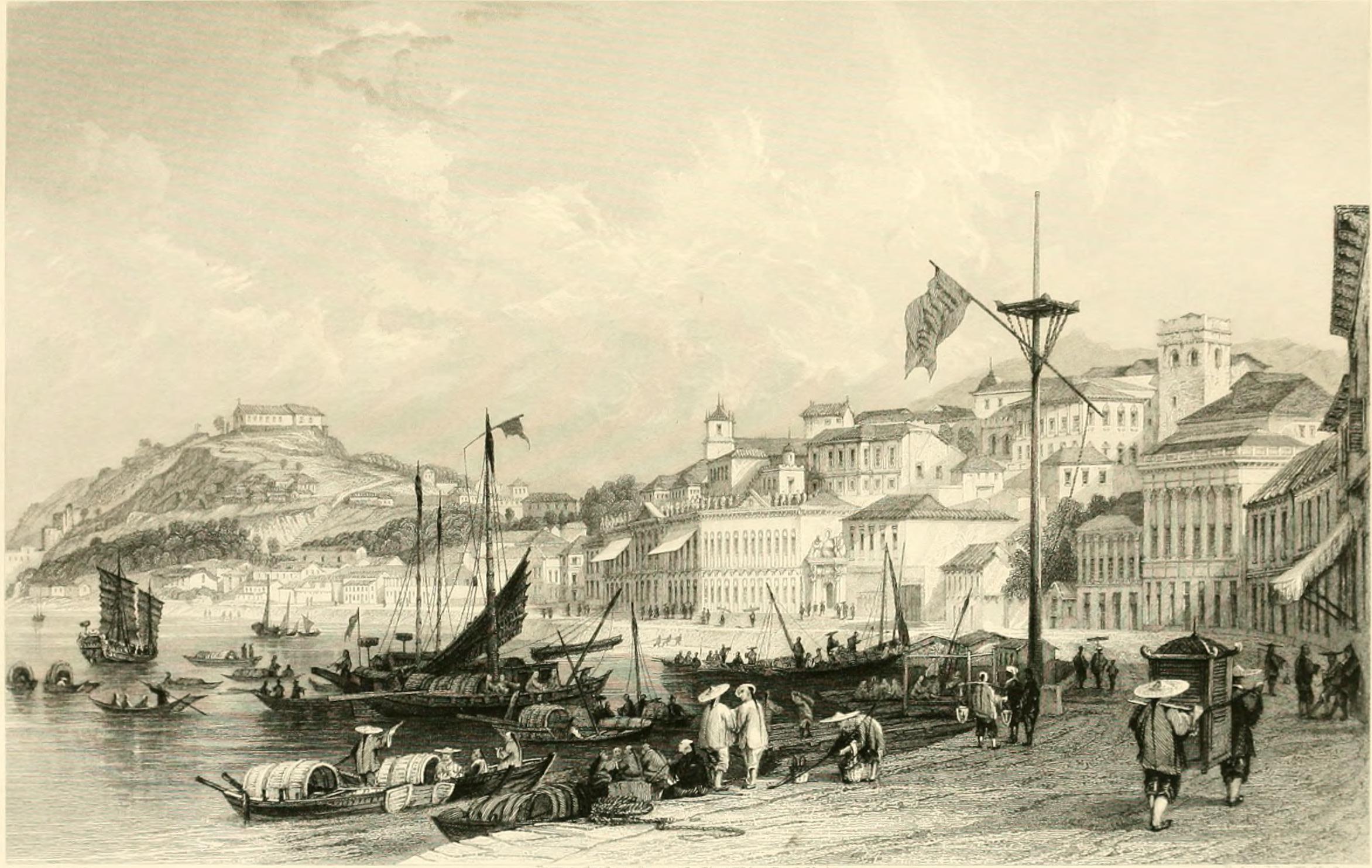
The Praia Grande (published 1843)

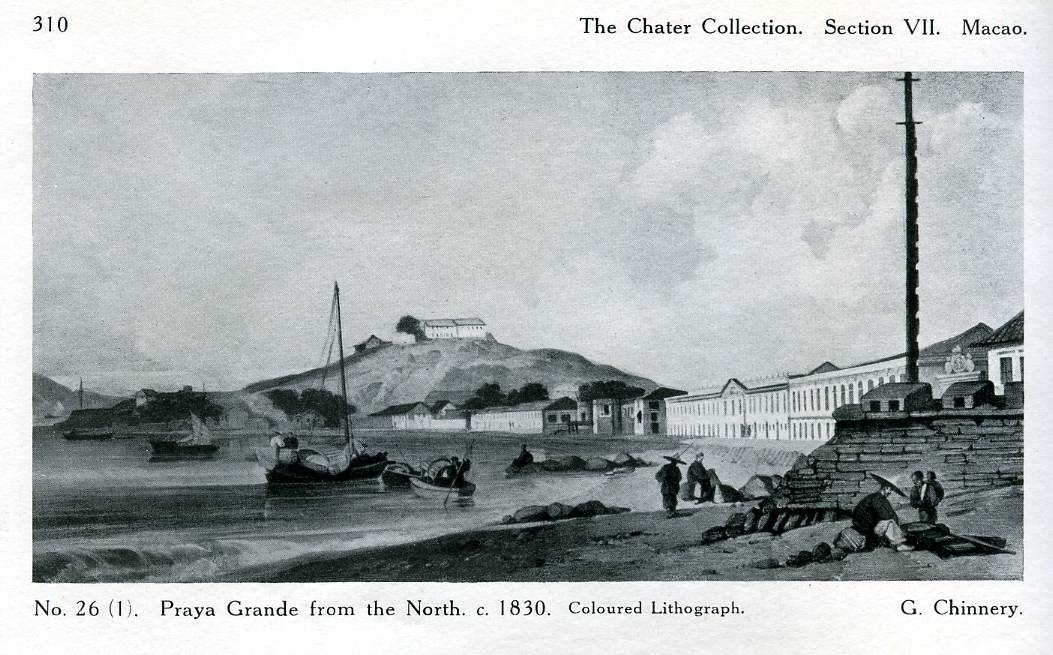
Praia Grande from the north, c. 1830

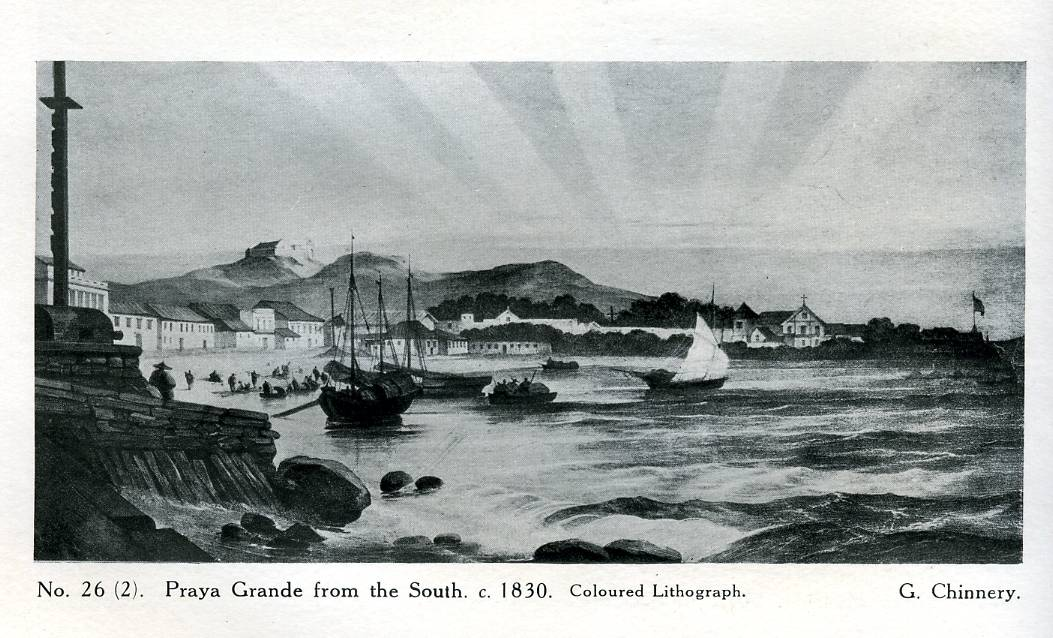
Praia Grande from the south, c. 1830

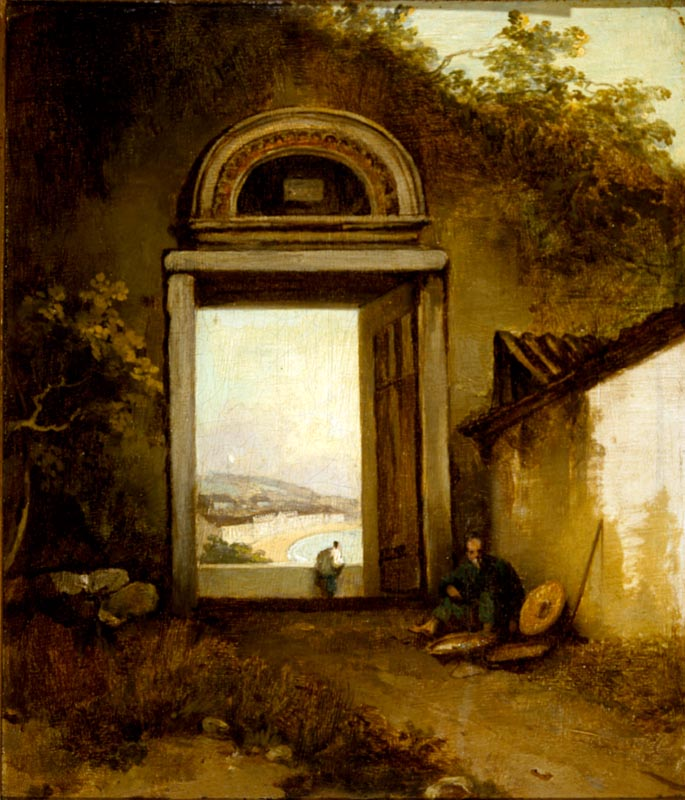
View of Praia Grande from a doorway on Penha Hill, 1834

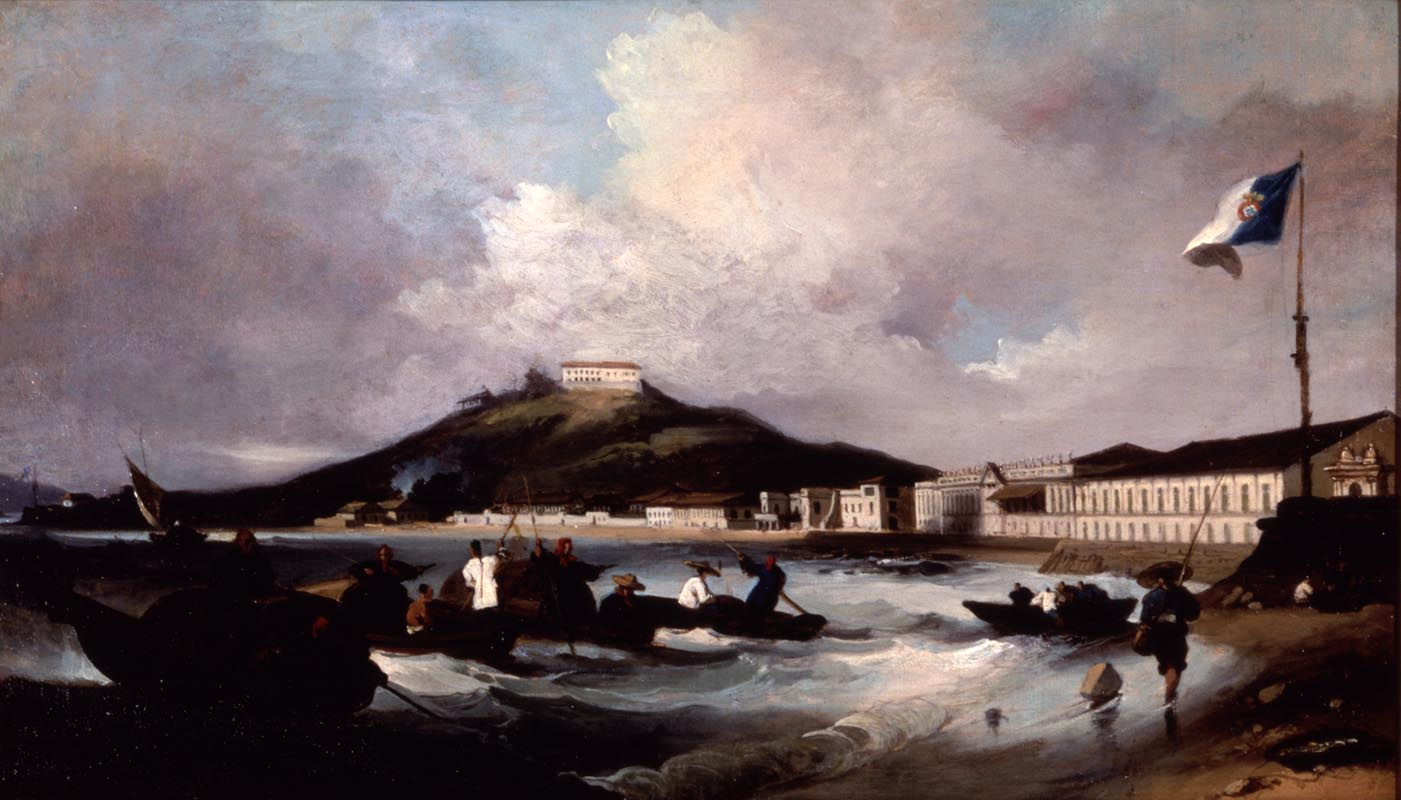
Praia Grande, 1825–52

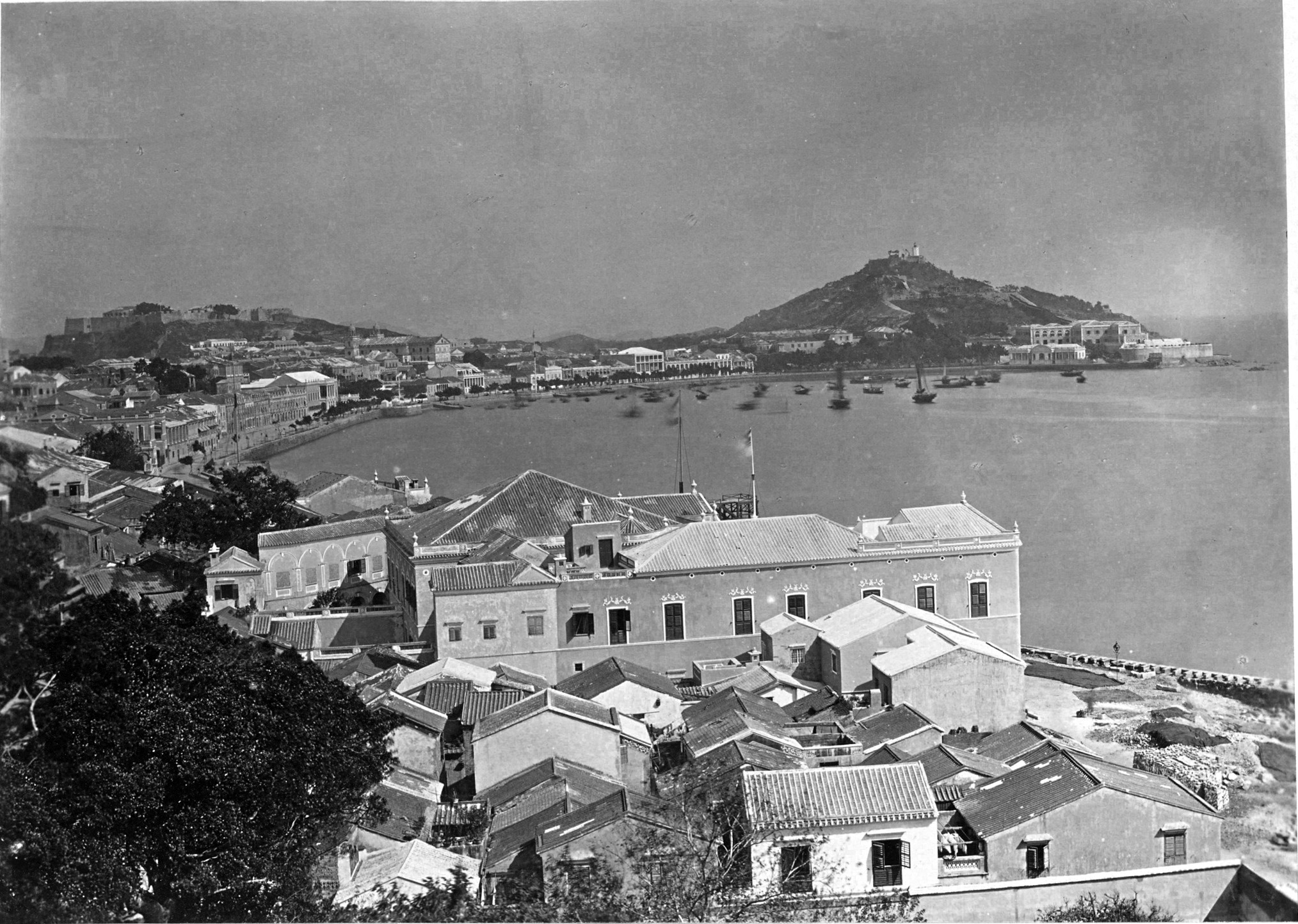
Praya Grande from Mr. Endicott's Garden, 1860 - 80

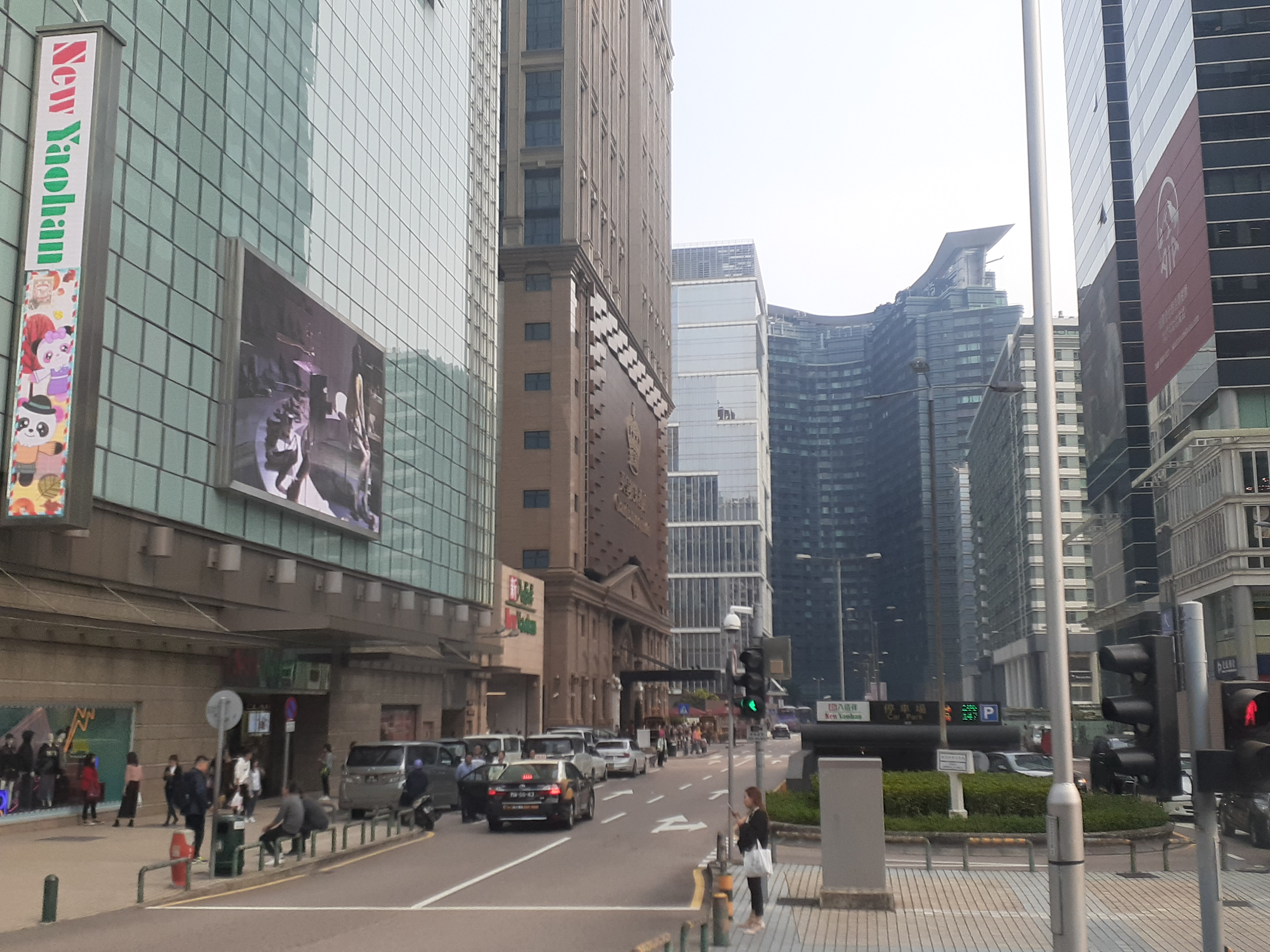
Business district, 2019

== See also ==
- Geography of Macau
- Victoria Harbour, Hong Kong
