= Amizade Bridge (Macau) =

Amizade Bridge: 澳門友誼大橋; Ponte da Amizade
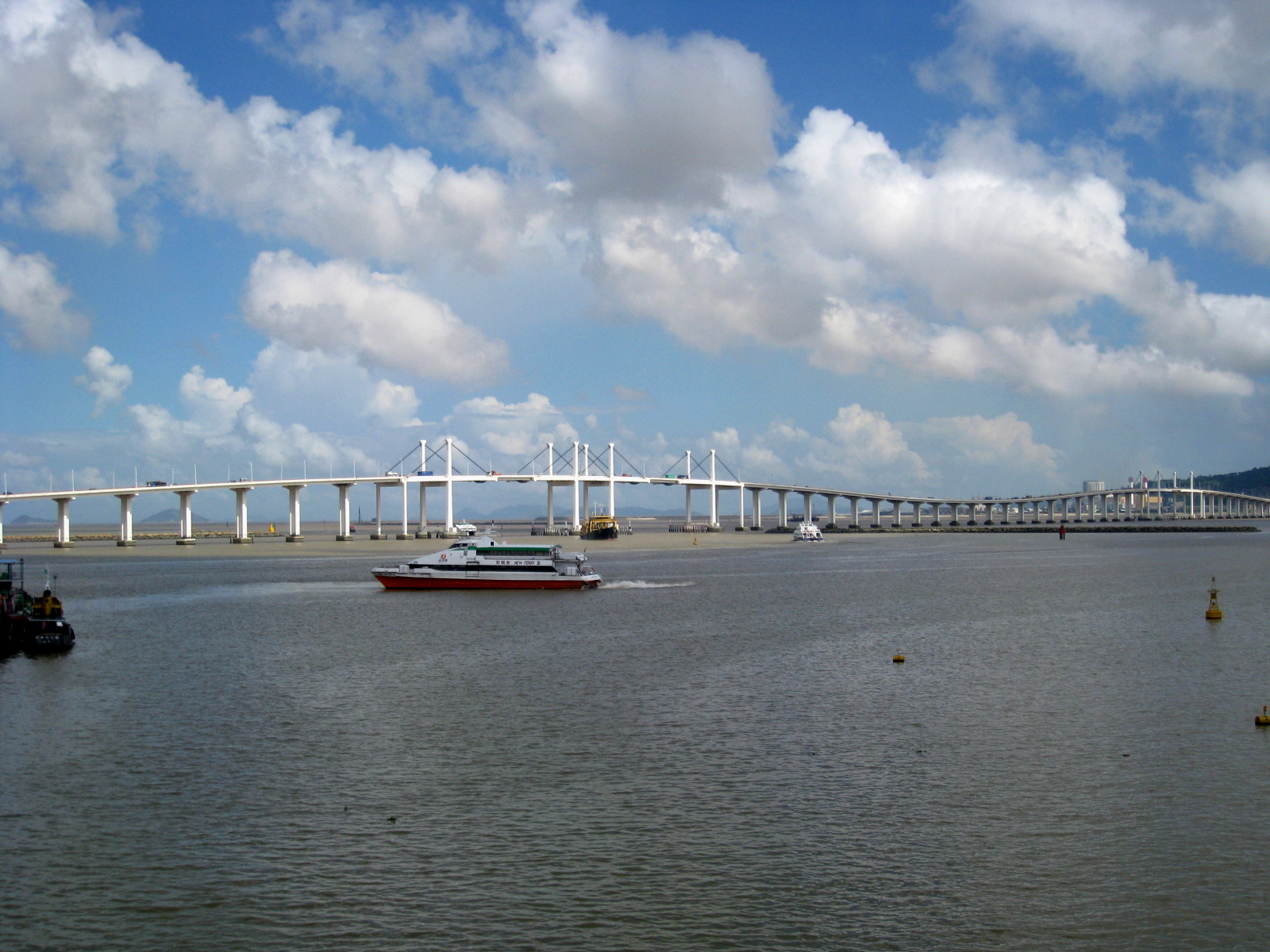
- Amizade Bridge
- Coordinates: 22°11′21.54″N 113°33′47.50″E
- Carries: 4 lanes
- Crosses: Praia Grande Bay
- Locale: Macau Peninsula and Taipa
- Other name(s): New Macau–Taipa Bridge

Characteristics
- Design: Cable-stayed bridge
- Total length: 3,900 m (12,795 ft)
- Width: 18 m (59 ft)
- Longest span: 180 m (591 ft)

History
- Opened: April 1994

Statistics
- Daily traffic: cars
- Toll: free

Amizade Bridge

Chinese name
- Traditional Chinese: 澳門友誼大橋
- Simplified Chinese: 澳门友谊大桥
- Literal meaning: Macau friendship bridge
Transcriptions
Standard Mandarin
- Hanyu Pinyin: Àomén Yǒuyì Dàqiáo
Yue: Cantonese
- Jyutping: ou3 mun4 jau5 ji4 daai6 kiu4

Alternative Chinese name
- Traditional Chinese: 新澳氹大橋
- Simplified Chinese: 新澳氹大桥
- Literal meaning: New Macau–Taipa Bridge
Transcriptions
Standard Mandarin
- Hanyu Pinyin: Xīn Àodàng Dàqiáo
Yue: Cantonese
- Jyutping: san1 ou3 tam5 daai6 kiu4

Portuguese name
- Portuguese: Ponte da Amizade

The Amizade Bridge is a four-lane, two-way bridge in Macau that connects Macau Peninsula near the Reservatório and Taipa Island.

Built after the Macau–Taipa Bridge, it is the second one that connects the peninsula and Taipa across the Zhujiang River Estuary.

The construction of the bridge began in 1988, and it was opened to traffic in April 1994. It is the longest of the three bridges crossing Baía da Praia Grande between Macau Peninsula and Taipa, with a length of 4.7 kilometers (2.9 mi), including 800 meters (2,625 ft) of connecting viaduct, and a width of 18 meters (59 ft). There are two crests on the bridge to allow for the passage of sea traffic. The highest point of the bridge is 30 meters (98 ft) above sea level. The two entrances on the peninsula are at Avenida da Amizade near the Hong Kong–Macau Ferry Terminal and at Avenida da Ponte da Amizade in Areia Preta. The two entrances on the northern slope of Taipa Grande are at Estrada de Pac On, that connects to Pac On, and at Estrada Almirante Magalhães Correia, that connects with the Centro of Taipa (Vila da Taipa).

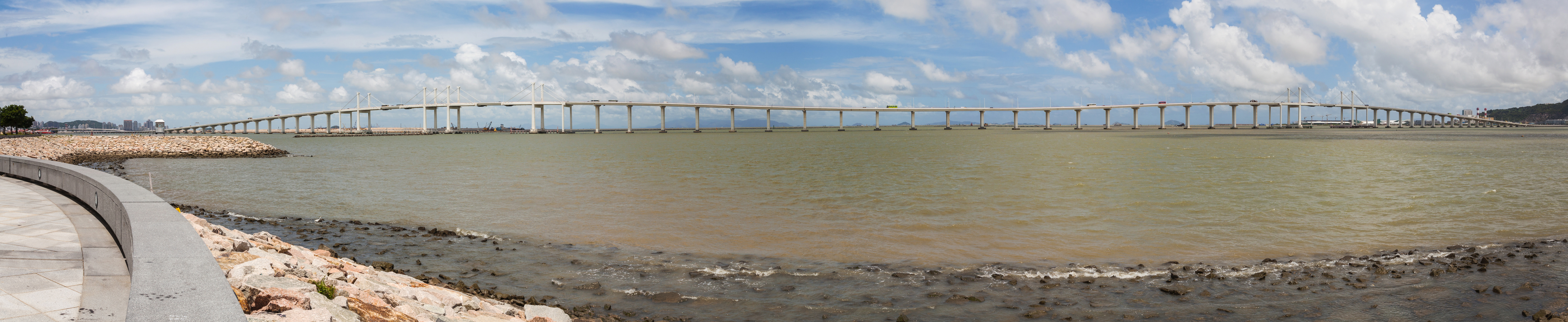
Panoramic view of the 4.7 km long Ponte da Amizade (Friendship Bridge) from the Macau Peninsula (left) to the Taipa Island (right), Macau

== See also ==
- Transport in Macau
