= Macau Peninsula =

Peninsular part of Macau

Coordinates: 22.1980°N 113.5473°E

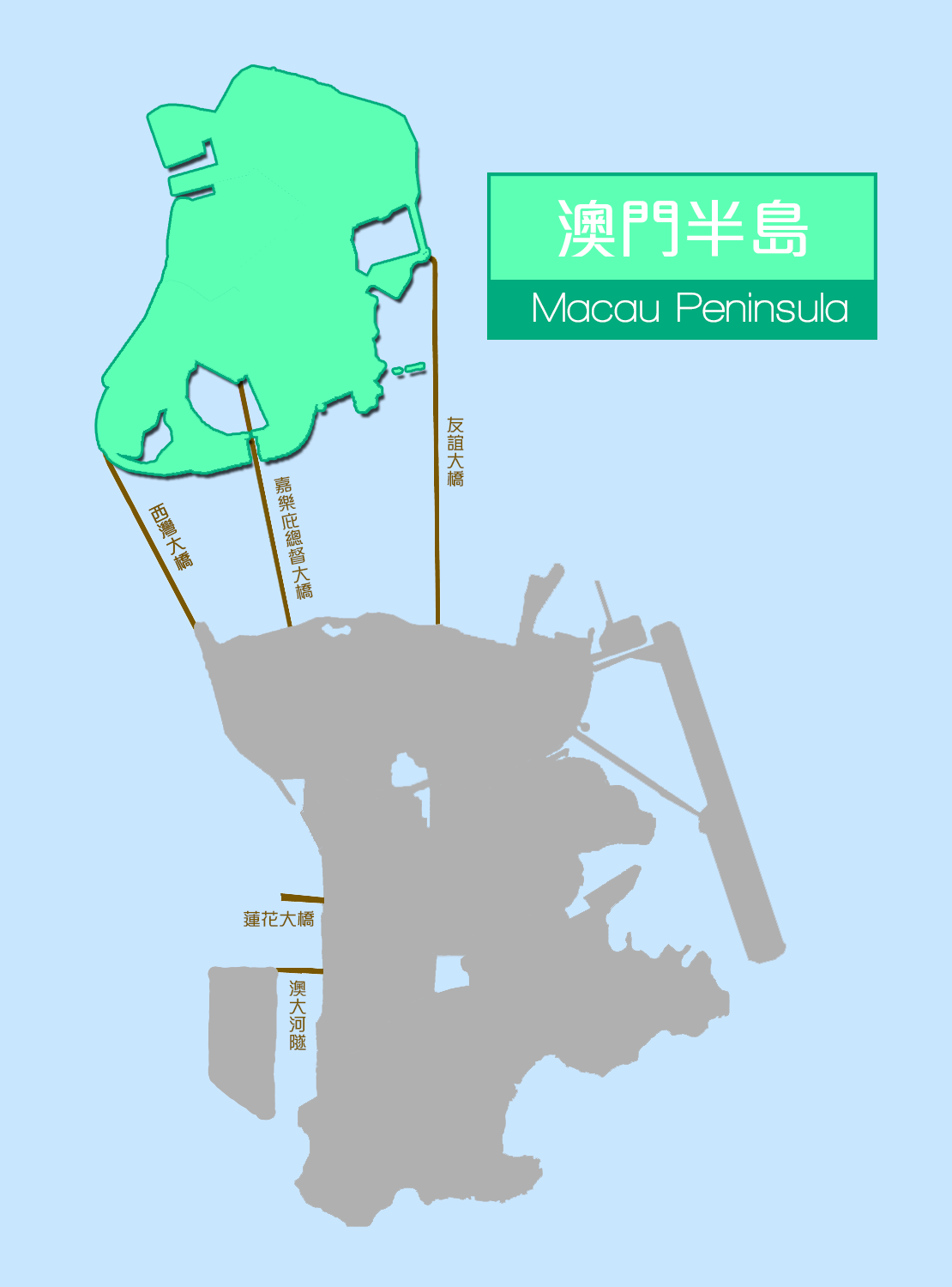

Chinese name
- Traditional Chinese: 澳門半島
- Simplified Chinese: 澳门半岛
- Jyutping: Ou3mun2 Bun3dou2
Transcriptions
Standard Mandarin
- Hanyu Pinyin: Aōmén Bàndǎo
Yue: Cantonese
- Yale Romanization: Oumún Bundóu
- Jyutping: Ou3mun2 Bun3dou2
- IPA: [ɔw˧.mun˧˥ pun˧.tɔw˧˥]

Portuguese name
- Portuguese: Península de Macau

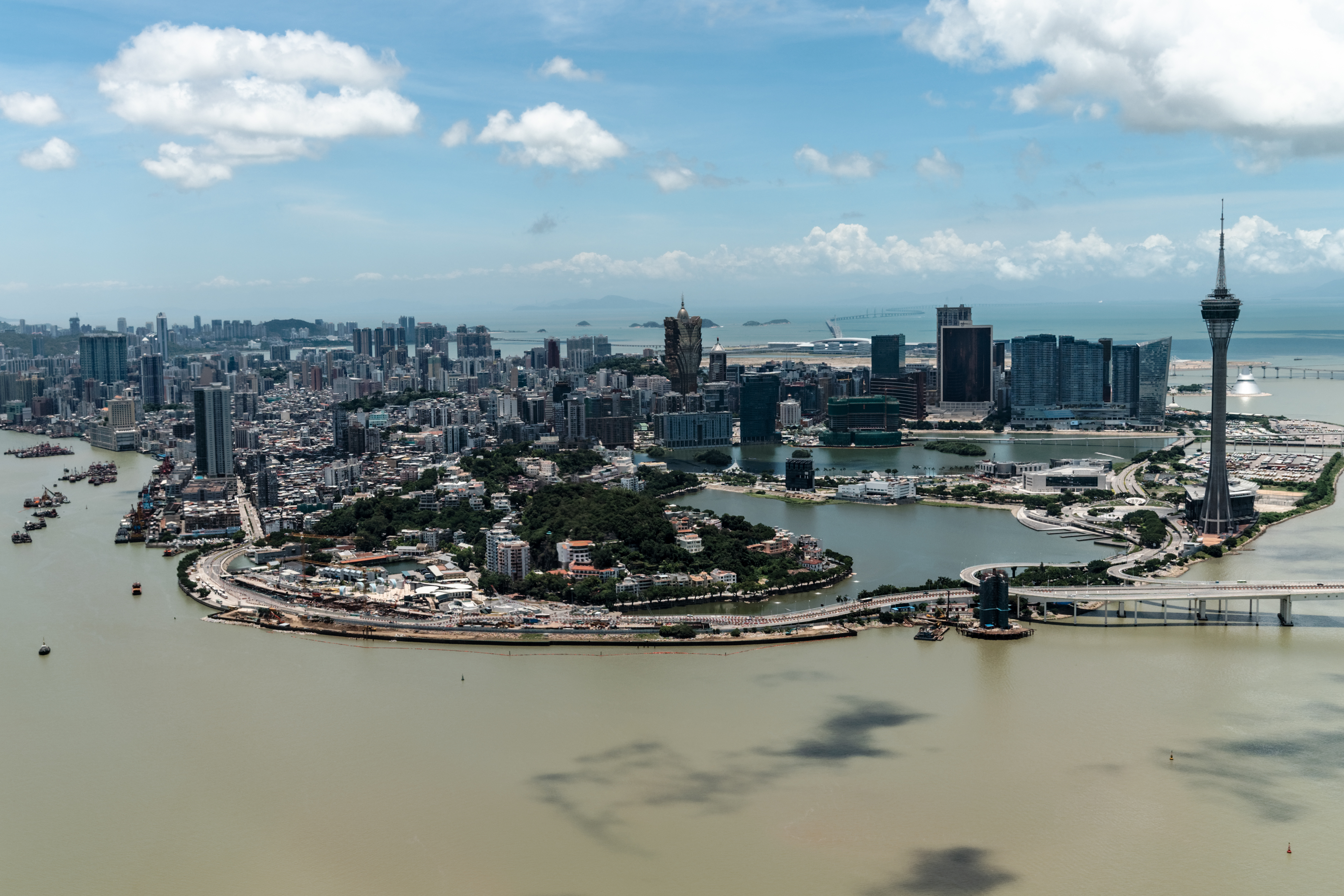

The Macau Peninsula is the historical and most populous part of Macau. It has an area of 8.5 square kilometers (3.3 sq mi) (4 by 1.8 kilometers (2.5 mi × 1.1 mi)) and is geographically connected to Guangdong Province at the northeast through an isthmus 200 meters (660 ft) wide. The peninsula, together with downtown Zhuhai, sits on Zhongshan Island in the south of the Pearl River Delta. The Border Gate (Chinese: 關閘; Portuguese: Portas do Cerco) was built on the northern isthmus. At the south, the peninsula is connected to Taipa Island by three bridges, the Friendship Bridge (Ponte da Amizade); the Macau-Taipa Bridge (Ponte Governador Nobre de Carvalho); and the Sai Van Bridge (Ponte de Sai Van), respectively. The longest axis extends 4 kilometers (2.5 mi) from the Border Gate to the southwestern edge, Barra (媽閣嘴). There is a western "Inner Harbor" (內港) paralleled by an "Outer Harbor" (外港) to the east. The 93 meters (305 ft) Guia Hill (松山) is the highest point on the peninsula, which has an average elevation of 50 to 75 meters (164 to 246 ft). Many coastal places are reclaimed from the sea. The Historic Centre of Macau, which is entirely on the Macau Peninsula, became a World Heritage Site in 2005.

== Early history ==
In 1514, Portuguese explorer Jorge Álvares arrived at Tunmen in the Pearl River Delta. Álvares likely traveled on Malaccan or Chinese ships and returned with profitable cargo. A Portuguese settlement was started at Tamão and by 1535 the traders were allowed to anchor their ships in the Macau harbour. In 1887, the Sino-Portuguese Treaty of Peking was signed, allowing "the perpetual occupation and government of Macau by Portugal".

According to National Geographic, "Macau may never have existed if not for Tamão" where the Portuguese learned "how China, the Pearl River Delta, and the South China Sea worked". The settlement and Jorge Álvares "kickstarted a chain of events that ultimately spawned Macau". A large stone sculpture of Álvares still stands in downtown Macau.

== Freguesias ==
The peninsula corresponds to the historical Municipality of Macau, one of Macau's two municipalities that were abolished on 31 December 2001 by Law No. 17/2001, following the 1999 transfer of sovereignty over Macau from Portugal to China.

This municipality was divided into five parishes (freguesia), and while their administrative functions have since been voided, these parishes are still retained nominally.

Freguesia / Parish	2013 Area (km²)	2013 Area (mi²)	2013 Population	Density (/km²)	Density (/mi²)
Nossa Senhora de Fátima (花地瑪)	3.2	1.2	237,500	74,218	197,917
Santo António (花王 / 聖安多尼)	1.1	0.4	129,800	118,000	324,500
São Lázaro (望德)	0.6	0.2	33,100	55,166	165,500
Sé (大)	3.4	1.3	52,200	15,352	40,154
São Lourenço (風順 / 聖老愣佐)	1.0	0.4	51,700	51,700	129,250
Total	9.3	3.6	504,300	54,226	140,083

== See also ==
- Coloane
- Cotai
- Friendship Bridge
- Governor Nobre de Carvalho Bridge
- Macau
- Sai Van Bridge
- Taipa
- lha Verde
