= Governor Nobre de Carvalho Bridge =

Governor Nobre de Carvalho Bridge: 嘉樂庇總督大橋; Ponte Governador Nobre de Carvalho
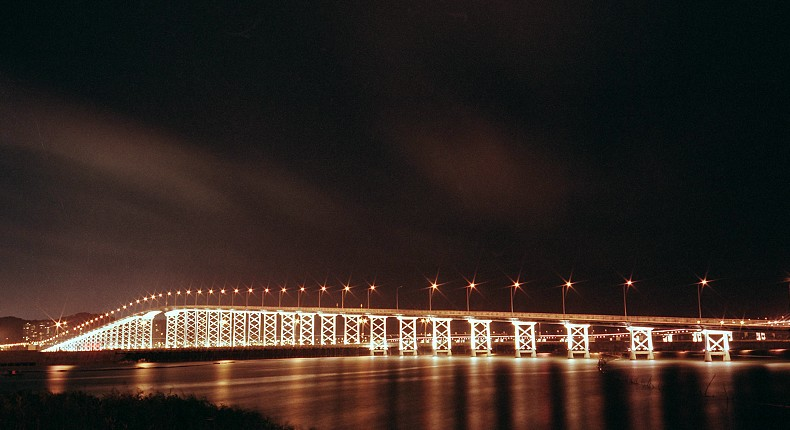
- Governor Nobre de Carvalho Bridge at night
- Coordinates: 22°10′35″N 113°32′46″E
- Carries: 2 lanes
- Crosses: Praia Grande Bay
- Locale: Macau Peninsula and Taipa
- Other name: Macau-Taipa Bridge

Characteristics
- Design: Girder bridge
- Total length: 2,569.8 meters (8,431 ft) → 2,436 meters (7,992 ft)
- Width: 9.2 meters (30 ft)
- Longest span: 73 meters (240 ft)

History
- Opened: 5 October 1974

Statistics
- Daily traffic: buses and taxis
- Toll: free

Location
- Interactive map of Governor Nobre de Carvalho Bridge

Governor Nobre de Carvalho Bridge
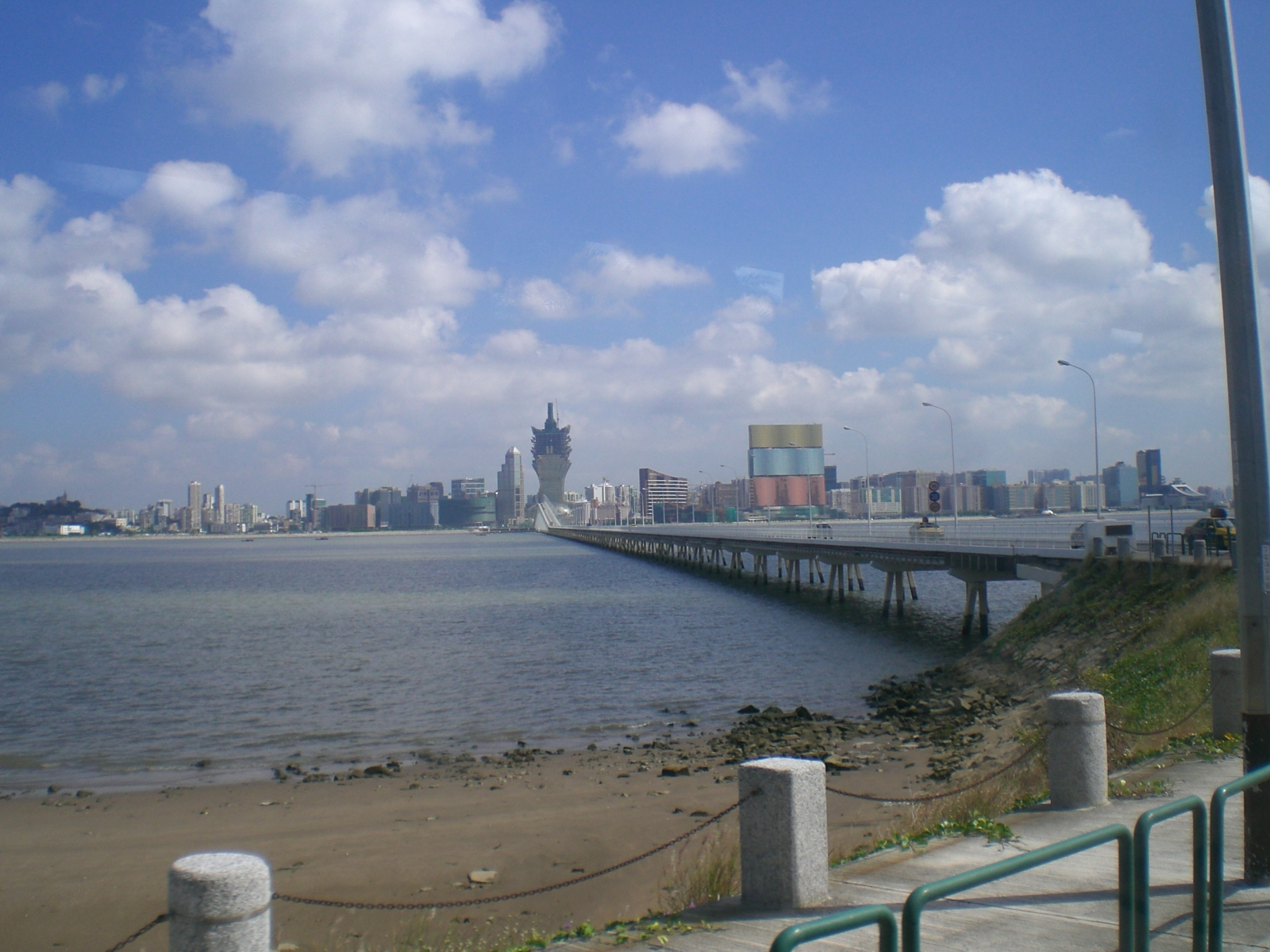

Chinese name
- Traditional Chinese: 嘉樂庇總督大橋
- Simplified Chinese: 嘉乐庇总督大桥
Transcriptions
Standard Mandarin
- Hanyu Pinyin: Jiālèbì zǒngdū dàqiáo
- Wade–Giles: Chialepi tsungtu tach'iao
Yue: Cantonese
- Yale Romanization: ga1 lok6 bei3 jung2 duk1 daai6 kiu4
- Jyutping: gaa1 lok6 bei3 zung2 duk1 daai6 kiu4

Macau-Taipa Bridge
- Traditional Chinese: 澳氹大橋
- Simplified Chinese: 澳氹大桥
Transcriptions
Standard Mandarin
- Hanyu Pinyin: Àodàng dàqiáo
- Wade–Giles: Aotang tach'iao
Yue: Cantonese
- Yale Romanization: ou3 tam5 daai6 kiu4
- Jyutping: ou3 tam5 daai6 kiu4

Second alternative Chinese name
- Traditional Chinese: 舊大橋
- Simplified Chinese: 旧大桥
Transcriptions
Standard Mandarin
- Hanyu Pinyin: Jiù Dà Qiáo
Yue: Cantonese
- Jyutping: gau6 daai6 kiu4

Portuguese name
- Portuguese: Ponte Governador Nobre de Carvalho

The Governor Nobre de Carvalho Bridge, also known as the Macau–Taipa Bridge, is a dual-lane two-way bridge connecting Macau Peninsula near Casino Lisboa and the island of Taipa at the northern slope of Taipa Pequena (Small Taipa Hill) crossing the former Baía da Praia Grande. It is the first bridge in Macau, to connect the peninsula and Taipa. It is locally known as "The Old Bridge" (Chinese: 舊大橋).

== History ==
Governor Nobre de Carvalho Bridge was the first bridge constructed in Macau and was designed to speed up travel across the colony as opposed to the one hour boat trip it used to take. The bridge was designed by Edgar Cardoso. Construction started in June 1970, during Portuguese rule. With a length of 2,569.8 meters (8,431 ft) and a width of 9.2 meters (30 ft), it was open to traffic in October 1974. The middle of the bridge is raised over a distance of 1213 m to allow vessels to pass through a 73 m wide passage. The highest point of the bridge is 35 meters (115 ft) above sea level. Seen from a distance, this part of the bridge resembles a flat triangle. It is named after José Manuel de Sousa e Faria Nobre de Carvalho, the Governor of Macau from 25 November 1966 to 19 November 1974 who came up with the idea for the bridge. After a later rearrangement of the shoreline, the bridge was shortened to 2,436 meters (7,992 ft). The bridge was originally a toll bridge but the toll was dropped in 1982 due to the volume of traffic.

Due to the construction around Casino Lisboa, the bridge was temporarily closed in 2005. As of 2006, the bridge is open again, but only to buses, taxis, and emergency vehicles. In 2024, a Hong Kong registered fishing vessel struck the bridge's protective rail. This caused only minor damage to the bridge but the boat started sinking with the crew being rescued by the Macau Customs Service. In 2026, the Member of the Legislative Assembly of Macau José Pereira Coutinho suggested banning heavy vehicles and buses to avoid damaging the already old bridge.

As of today, The bridge is still in used. with people trying to get to work by bus or taxi, or people trying to exercise by jogging on the bridge.

== Architecture ==
The bridge is meant to take the shape of a dragon, with Casino Lisboa representing the dragon's head, and Taipa Monument on Taipa Pequena the dragon's tail.

== See also ==
- Transport in Macau
