= Second term of Fernando Chui as Chief Executive of Macau =

Second term of Fernando Chui Sai On as Chief Executive of Macau Cabinet
- 4th Cabinet of Macau
- Incumbent
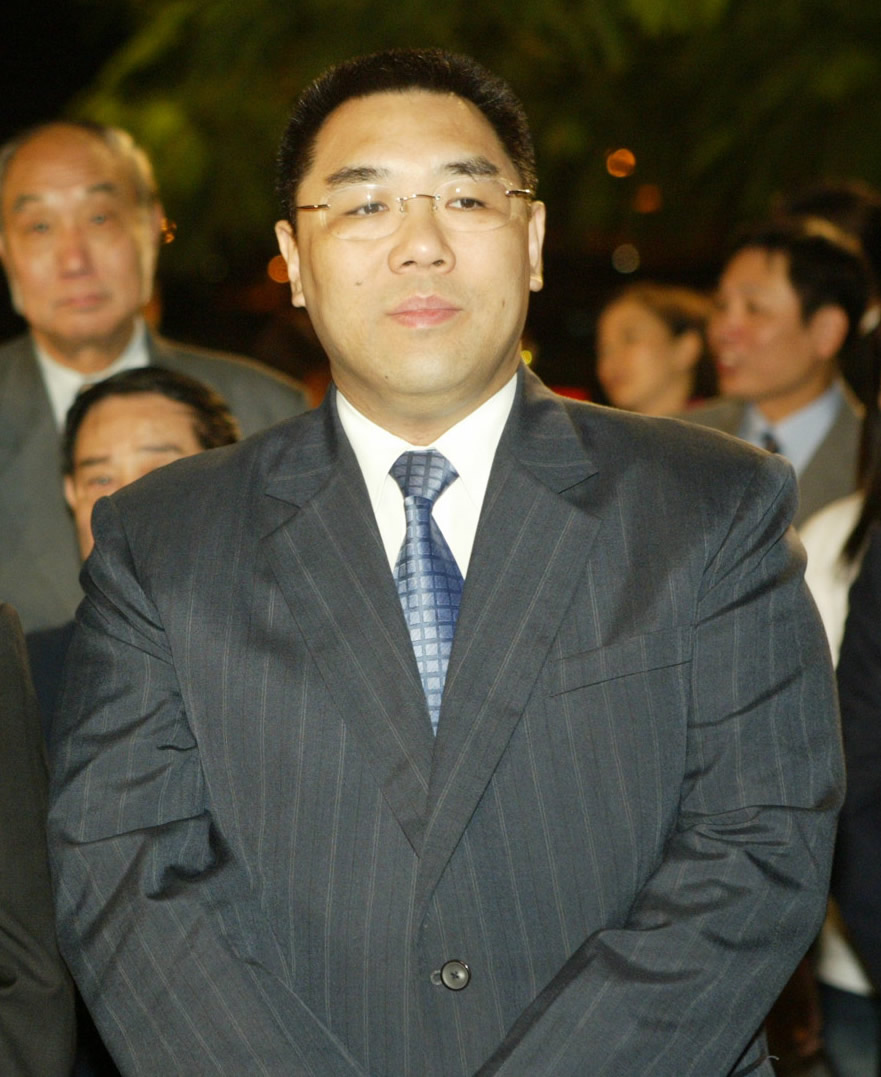
- Date formed: 20 December 2014
- Date dissolved: 20 December 2019

People and organisations
- Head of government: Fernando Chui Sai On
- Total no. of members: 5
- Member party: Nonpartisan

History
- Elections: 31 August 2014
- Legislature term: 10th
- Predecessor: Fernando Chui I
- Successor: Ho Iat Seng

The second term of Fernando Chui Sai On as Chief Executive of Macau, officially considered part of "The 4th term Chief Executive of Macau", relates to the period of governance of Macau since the transfer of sovereignty over Macau, between 20 December 2014 and 20 December 2019. Fernando Chui Sai On was reelected in mid 2014 by 400-member Selection Committee.

== Election ==
On 16 July 2014, Chief Executive Fernando Chui Sai On announced his bid for reelection for CE office and promised "a relatively radical change" within his government. No other candidates has announced any intention to run for the CE office. On the 21 July, CE Fernando Chui Sai On was able to secure more than 66 electoral colleges. On 31 August 2014, Fernando Chui Sai On was re-elected unopposed with total of 380 electoral college with 96.95% of total votes. Fernando Chui Sai On promised to take opinions from more public and civil group he also stated he will fulfill all he promises during his campaign however he stayed muted about the new secretaries. During the election New Macau Association held rallies against the small circle undemocratic CE election. Macau Conscience, Macau Youth Dynamics and Open Macau Society organised 2014 Civil Referendum on Chief Executive Election at which 7,762 (89%) voted having no confidence in the sole candidate Fernando Chui and 8,259 (95%) voted favour of universal suffrage for the 2019 election. The referendum was deemed illegal and breached of privacy by the Government of Macau.

== Cabinet ==
=== New members ===
During Fernando Chui Sai On's 2014 CE campaign he promised "a relatively radical change" within his government indicating a new faces within his new cabinet. In early November a month before Fernando Chui Sai On second term starts sources from Jornal Tribuna de Macau leaked about the new cabinet members. Executive Council member Lionel Leong Vai Tac will replace Francis Tam Pak Yuen as Secretary for Economy and Finance, Director of Judiciary Police Wong Sio Chak will replace Cheong Kuoc Vá as Secretary for Security, President of the Electoral Affairs Committee Song Man Lei or Secretary for Social Affairs and Culture Cheong U will replace Florinda da Rosa Silva Chan as Secretary for Administration and Justice, Government Spokesperson Alexis Tam Chon Weng will replace Cheong U as Secretary for Social Affairs and Culture, and Director of Macau Economic and Trade Office to the EU in Brussels Raimundo Arrais do Rosário will replace Lau Si Io as Secretary for Transport and Public Works. The report also leaked the Director of Legal Affairs Bureau André Cheong Weng Chon will replace Vasco Fong Man Chong as Commissioner Against Corruption of Macau and Commissioner-General of the Unitary Police Service José Proença Branco will replace Ma Io Kun as the head of Public Security Police Force, while Procurator General of Macau Ho Chio Meng, Commissioner of Audit Ho Veng On, and Director-General of the Macau Customs Service Choi Lai Heng will keep their positions.

Another newspaper "Ou Mun" broke news believed Coordinator of the Office for Personal Data Protection Sonia Chan Hoi Fan is another possible candidate to replace Florinda da Rosa Silva Chan as Secretary for Administration and Justice.

The final cabinet list was finalized on 2 December 2014, with Sonia Chan Hoi Fan as Secretary for Administration and Justice, Lionel Leong Vai Tac as Secretary for Economy and Finance, Wong Sio Chak as Secretary for Security, Alexis Tam Chong Veng as Secretary for Social Affairs and Culture, and Raimundo Arrais do Rosário as Secretary for Transport and Public Works.

=== Ministry ===
The policy bureaux were under several reorganisations during the term as following:

Cabinet members
Portfolio	Minister	Took office	Left office	Party	Ref
Chief Executive	Fernando Chui Sai On	20 December 2014	Incumbent	Nonpartisan	
Secretary for Administration and Justice	Sonia Chan Hoi Fan	20 December 2014	Incumbent	Nonpartisan	
Secretary for Economy and Finance	Lionel Leong Vai Tac	20 December 2014	Incumbent	Nonpartisan	
Secretary for Security	Wong Sio Chak	20 December 2014	Incumbent	Nonpartisan	
Secretary for Social Affairs and Culture	Alexis Tam Chong Veng	20 December 2014	Incumbent	Nonpartisan	
Secretary for Transport and Public Works	Raimundo Arrais do Rosário (Lo Lap Man)	20 December 2014	Incumbent	Nonpartisan	

=== Other principal officers ===
- Ho Veng On as Commissioner of Audit
- André Cheong Weng Chon as Commissioner Against Corruption
- Ma Io Kun as head of the Unitary Police Service
- Ip Son Sang as Prosecutor General
- Lai Man Va as Director-General of the Macau Customs Service

=== Executive Council members ===
The Executive Council was presided by President Fernando Chui Sai On and consisted of total 11 members. All members are appointed by the Chief Executive from among members of the Legislative Council and other influential public personnels. Only two new members were introduced Sonia Chan Hoi Fan the Secretary for Administration and Justice replacing Florinda da Rosa Silva Chan and Chan Chak Mo replacing Leong Vai Tac.

The Convenor of the members TBD.

Members	Affiliation	Portfolio	Took Office	Left Office	Ref
Sonia Chan Hoi Fan	Nonpartisan	Secretary for Administration and Justice	20 December 2014	Incumbent	
Leong Heng Teng	UPP	Vice President of The Committee of Cultural Industries	20 December 2014	Incumbent	
Liu Chak Wan	Nonpartisan	Chairman of New Tenhon Investment	20 December 2014	Incumbent	
Alexandre Ma Iao Lai	Nonpartisan	President of Macau China-Africa Business Council	20 December 2014	Incumbent	
Leonel Alberto Alves	UIPM	Member of the Legislative Assembly	20 December 2014	Incumbent	
Cheang Chi Keong	UIEM	Member of the Legislative Assembly	20 December 2014	Incumbent	
Chan Meng Kam	ACUM	Member of the Legislative Assembly	20 December 2014	Incumbent	
Ho Sut Heng	Nonpartisan	President of the Macau Federation of Trade Unions	20 December 2014	Incumbent	
Eddie Wong Yue Kai	Nonpartisan	President of the Central Council of the Macau Red Cross	20 December 2014	Incumbent	
Peter Lam Kam Seng	Nonpartisan	Chairman of University of Macau	20 December 2014	Incumbent	
Chan Chak Mo	UE	Member of the Legislative Assembly	20 December 2014	Incumbent	

Preceded by Chui I	Government of Macau; 2014-2019	Succeeded by Ho
