= 2019 Macanese Chief Executive election =

← 2014	25 August 2019	2024 →

All 400 votes of the Election Committee 201 votes needed to win
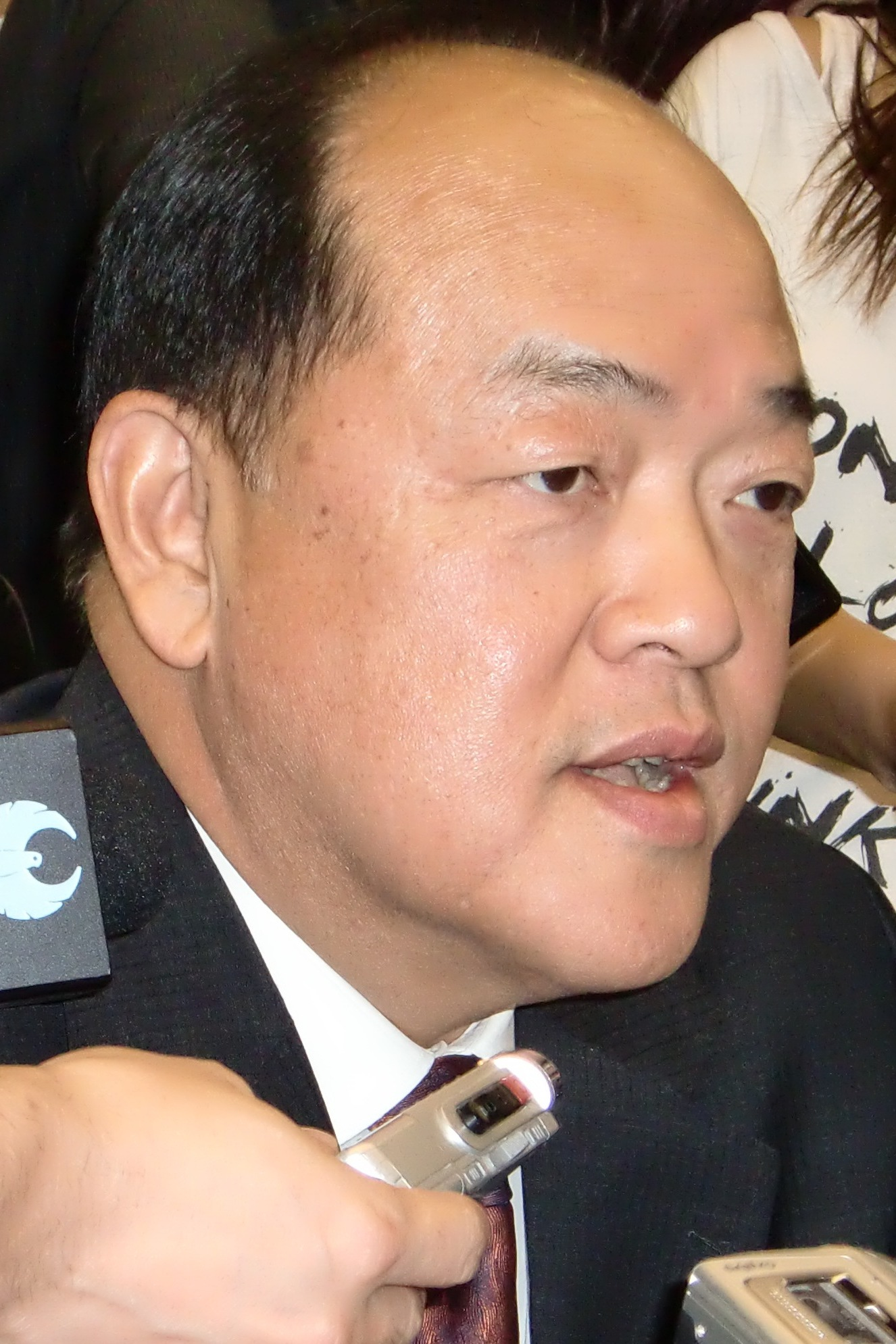
Candidate	Ho Iat-seng
Party	Independent
Alliance	Pro-Beijing
Electoral vote	392
Chief Executive before election
Fernando Chui
Independent
Elected Chief Executive
Ho Iat-seng
Independent

The 2019 Macanese Chief Executive election was held on 25 August 2019 for the 5th term of the Chief Executive of Macau (CE), the highest office of the Macau Special Administrative Region. Incumbent Chief Executive Fernando Chui, who was re-elected once already, was not eligible to run for the office under Macao Basic Law, the mini-constitution of the territory. Ho Iat-seng, former President of the Legislative Assembly of Macau, won as the sole candidate of the election.

== Background ==
Election for 399 Election Committee members, whose duty is to elect the new Chief Executive, was held on 16 June 2019.

On 18 April 2019 the third President of the Legislative Assembly of Macau Ho Iat-seng announced his bid for CE office and tendered his resignation as the President of AL, Member of AL, Member of the NPCSC, and the 400 members Election Committee for the Chief Executive of Macau which was temporary reduced to 399 members. On 23 April the Chairman of the NPCSC Li Zhanshu formally accepted Ho's resignation from the NPCSC. On 5 July 2019, Ho officially resigned from Legislative Assembly of Macau as President and Member of AL. On 23 June 2019, Ho was able to secure 378 electoral colleges becoming the sole candidate for CE, then appointed by Li Keqiang, Premier of China.

== Candidates ==
=== Announced ===
- Ho Iat-seng: Former President of the Legislative Assembly who resigned to contest the election.
- Liang Guo-zhou: Director of an investment advisor company.
- Xu Rong-cong: Former head of 澳門光明報, a local newspaper.
- Cai Ting-ting.
- Li Ai-ci.
- Shao Gai-rong: Honorary Consul of Papua New Guinea to Macau.
- Chen Rong-fu: Head of electric machines and air-conditioners engineering company.

=== Declined ===
- Chan Meng-kam: Former member of Legislative Assembly, businessman.
- Lionel Leon Vai-tac: Secretary of Economy and Finance.
- Wong Sio-chak: Secretary for Security of Macau.

== Civil vote ==
Pro-democracy political party New Macau Association virtually held "Civil Vote of CE Under Universal Suffrage" between 11 and 25 August 2019, of which one question regarding political reform was presented: "Do you agree the Chief Executive of Macau Special Administrative Region shall be selected by universal suffrage?". The vote was cut short on 23 August by the Association after the voting website and advertisement booths on street were being attacked. According to the result released, 5,351 voted yes (93.9%), 236 voted no (4.1%), and 111 abstained (2%).

== Results ==
Ho Iat-seng was elected after winning 98% of votes cast. The result was ratified by the Court of Final Appeal. Ho was officially appointed by Li Keqiang, Premier of the People's Republic of China, on 4 September 2019, and took office on 20 December.

Candidate	Party	Votes	%
Ho Iat-seng	Independent	392	100.00
Total		392	100.00
Valid votes		392	98.00
Invalid votes		1	0.25
Blank votes		7	1.75
Total votes		400	100.00
Registered voters/turnout		400	100.00
Source: General Audit Committee

== Controversies ==
The pro-democracy camp voices discontentment over the uncontested election, criticizing it as "one-man election", "sham election", and "small-circle election" as majority of residents cannot nominate and vote in the election.
