= Wealth Partaking Scheme =

Cash disbursement policy

Wealth Partaking Scheme (Chinese: 現金分享計劃; Portuguese: Plano de comparticipação pecuniária no desenvolvimento económico) is a cash disbursement policy to holders of a Macau Resident Identity Card by the Macau Special Administrative Region since 2008. The main purpose of the scheme is to share the results of the region's economic development with its people and help mitigate the effects of inflation.

== Target beneficiaries ==
Residents who have a valid or renewable Macau Resident Identity Card are the target beneficiaries of the scheme.

== Payment methods ==
Beneficiaries of the Social Welfare Bureau (IAS), which include teachers who receive direct subsidies, students who are subsidized with scholarships or from the Student Welfare Fund by the Education and Youth Affairs Bureau (DESJ), other retired civil service employees, and senior citizens may have their money automatically deposited in a banking account or they can receive a crossed cheque by post.

== Details of the scheme ==
Francis Tam, the Secretary for Economy and Finance, announced the Wealth Partaking Scheme at the Macau Government Headquarters on May 23, 2008. He said that for the initial run of the scheme, holders of permanent and non-permanent Macau Resident Identity Cards could receive 5,000 and 3,000 patacas respectively. More than 11,000 people who qualified for Macau Resident Identity Card applied for one after the scheme was announced, hoping to receive money. This is 10 times more than the normal number of applications.

In his policy address on November 11, 2008, Chief Executive of Macau Edmund Ho announced that the region would have another wealth sharing scheme in the next fiscal year (2009) to help offset the negative economic influence of the 2008 financial crisis. This time, permanent and non-permanent residents would receive 6,000 and 3,600 patacas as announced by Edmund Ho during the question and answer session in the Legislative Assembly of Macau on April 16, 2009. Every year since, the scheme has been a regular part of the Policy Address.

In his policy address on November 16, 2010, Chief Executive of Macau Fernando Chui announced a substantial decrease for the scheme to 4,000 and 2,400 patacas for permanent and non-permanent residents respectively. The next year on April 21, 2011, Chui announced that "Cash Subsidy" (Portuguese: Apoio Pecuniário, Chinese: 現金補助) would be 3,000 and 1,800 patacas to permanent and non-permanent residents respectively for that fiscal year. Despite this reduction, the total subsidy distribution in fiscal year 2011 was more than the previous fiscal year and it was the fiscal year to have cash subsidy policy only.

== Subsidy amount by year ==
| Date announced (DD/MM/YYYY) | Fiscal Year | Numbers of beneficiaries | Amount for permanent resident (patacas) | Amount for non-permanent resident (patacas) | Percentage change from previous fiscal year | Total amount of cash disbursement (patacas) | Notes | Ref(s). |
|---|---|---|---|---|---|---|---|---|
| 23/05/2008 | 2008 | 532,616 | 5,000 | 3,000 | Not Applicable | 2,541,104,000 | First scheme | |
| 11/11/2008 | 2009 | 547,648 | 6,000 | 3,600 | 20.00% | 3,129,836,400 | First time announced in the Policy Address | |
| 16/03/2010 | 2010 | 574,739 | 6,000 | 3,600 | ± 00.00% | 3,277,719,600 | | |
| 16/11/2010 | 2011 | 595,873 | 4,000 | 2,400 | 33.33% | 2,260,653,600 | amount for the Scheme only | |
| 20/04/2011 | 2011 | 511,840 (for cheques only) | 3,000 | 1,800 | Not Applicable | 1,809,099,600 | amount for the Cash Subsidy | |
| 15/11/2011 | 2012 | 615,072 | 7,000 | 4,200 | 75.00% | 4,099,860,800 | | |
| 13/11/2012 | 2013 | 634,084 | 8,000 | 4,800 | 14.29% | 4,860,931,200 | | |
| 12/11/2013 | 2014 | | 9,000 | 5,400 | 12.50% | | | |
| 11/11/2014 | 2015 | | 9,000 | 5,400 | ± 00.00% | | | |
| 17/11/2015 | 2016 | | 9,000 | 5,400 | ± 00.00% | | | |
| 15/11/2016 | 2017 | | 9,000 | 5,400 | ± 00.00% | | | |
| 14/11/2017 | 2018 | | 9,000 | 5,400 | ± 00.00% | | | |
| 15/11/2018 | 2019 | | 10,000 | 6,000 | 11.11% | | | |
| 29/05/2025 | 2025 | | 10,000 | 6,000 | | | | |
| Total amount | | Not Applicable | 75,000 | 45,800 | Not Applicable | | | |

== Supporting department ==
The Government of Macau set up the "Support Centre for Wealth Disbursement" (Portuguese: Centro de apoio ao pagamento da comparticipação pecuniária, Chinese: 現金分享發放輔助中心) in Largo Tap Seac on July 1, 2008, to disburse the payments and provide related services for the scheme. As the cheque from the scheme for each fiscal year is valid for three years, the Service Center of the Civic and Municipal Affairs Bureau (IACM) has acted on behalf of the Wealth Partaking Payment Assistance Center which located in 2/F, Edifício China Plaza, Avenida da Praia Grande since November 3, 2008.

== See also ==
- Basic income, unconditional government cash payments to the public
- Scheme $6,000, a similar scheme by the Hong Kong Government
- Social dividend, unconditional cash payment to the public derived from assets under public ownership
