= First term of Fernando Chui as Chief Executive of Macau =

First term of Fernando Chui Sai On as Chief Executive of Macau Cabinet
- 3rd Cabinet of Macau

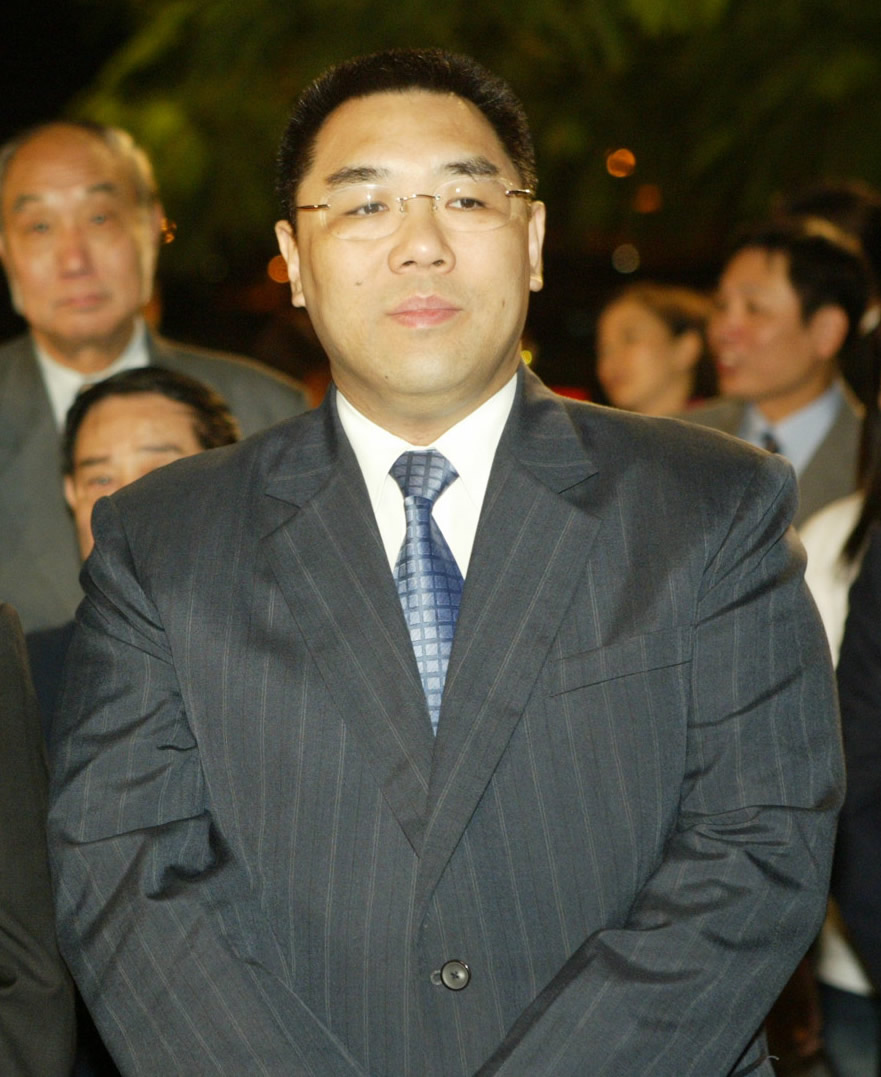
- Date formed: 20 December 2009
- Date dissolved: 20 December 2014

People and organisations
- Head of government: Fernando Chui Sai On
- Total no. of members: 5
- Member party: Nonpartisan

History
- Elections: 26 July 2009
- Legislature terms: 9th, 10th
- Predecessor: Edmund Ho II
- Successor: Fernando Chui II

The First term of Fernando Chui Sai On as Chief Executive of Macau, officially considered part of "The 3rd term Chief Executive of Macau", relates to the period of governance of Macau since the transfer of sovereignty over Macau, between 20 December 2009 and 20 December 2014. Fernando Chui Sai On was elected in mid 2009 by 300-member Selection Committee as the second Chief Executive of Macau.

== Cabinet ==
=== Ministry ===
The policy bureaux were under several reorganisations during the term as following:

Portfolio	Minister	Took office	Left office	Party	Ref
Chief Executive	Fernando Chui Sai On	20 December 2009	Chui II	Nonpartisan	
Secretary for Administration and Justice	Florinda da Rosa Silva Chan	20 December 2009	20 December 2014	Nonpartisan	
Secretary for Economy and Finance	Francis Tam Pak Yuen	20 December 2009	20 December 2014	Nonpartisan	
Secretary for Security	Cheong Kuoc Vá	20 December 2009	20 December 2014	Nonpartisan	
Secretary for Social Affairs and Culture	Cheong U	20 December 2009	20 December 2014	Nonpartisan	
Secretary for Transport and Public Works	Lau Si Io	20 December 2004	20 December 2014	Nonpartisan	

=== Executive Council members ===
The Executive Council was presided by President Fernando Chui Sai On and consisted of total 11 members. All members are appointed by the Chief Executive from among members of the Legislative Council and other influential public personnels.

The Convenor of the members was Leong Heng Teng.

Members	Affiliation	Portfolio	Took Office	Left Office	Ref
Florinda da Rosa Silva Chan	Nonpartisan	Secretary for Administration and Justice	20 December 2009	20 December 2014	
Leong Heng Teng	UPP	Convenor of the ExCo; Vice President of The Committee of Cultural Industries	20 December 2009	Chui II	
Liu Chak Wan	Nonpartisan politician	Chairman of New Tenhon Investment	20 December 2009	Chui II	
Alexandre Ma Iao Lai	Nonpartisan politician	President of Macau China-Africa Business Council	20 December 2009	Chui II	
Leonel Alberto Alves	UIPM	Member of the Legislative Assembly	20 December 2009	Chui II	
Cheang Chi Keong	UIEM	Member of the Legislative Assembly	20 December 2009	Chui II	
Lionel Leong Vai Tac	Nonpartisan politician	CEO of Seng San Enterprises; Chairman of the Smartable Holding	20 December 2009	20 December 2014	
Chan Meng Kam	ACUM	Member of the Legislative Assembly	20 December 2009	Chui II	
Ho Sut Heng	Nonpartisan politician	President of the Macau Federation of Trade Unions	20 December 2009	Chui II	
Eddie Wong Yue Kai	Nonpartisan politician	President of the Central Council of the Macau Red Cross	20 December 2009	Chui II	
Peter Lam Kam Seng	Nonpartisan politician	Chairman of University of Macau	24 October 2013	Chui II	

Preceded by Ho II	Government of Macau; 2009-014	Succeeded by Chui II
