= Second term of Edmund Ho as Chief Executive of Macau =

Second term of Edmund Ho Hau Wah as Chief Executive of Macau Cabinet
- 2nd Cabinet of Macau

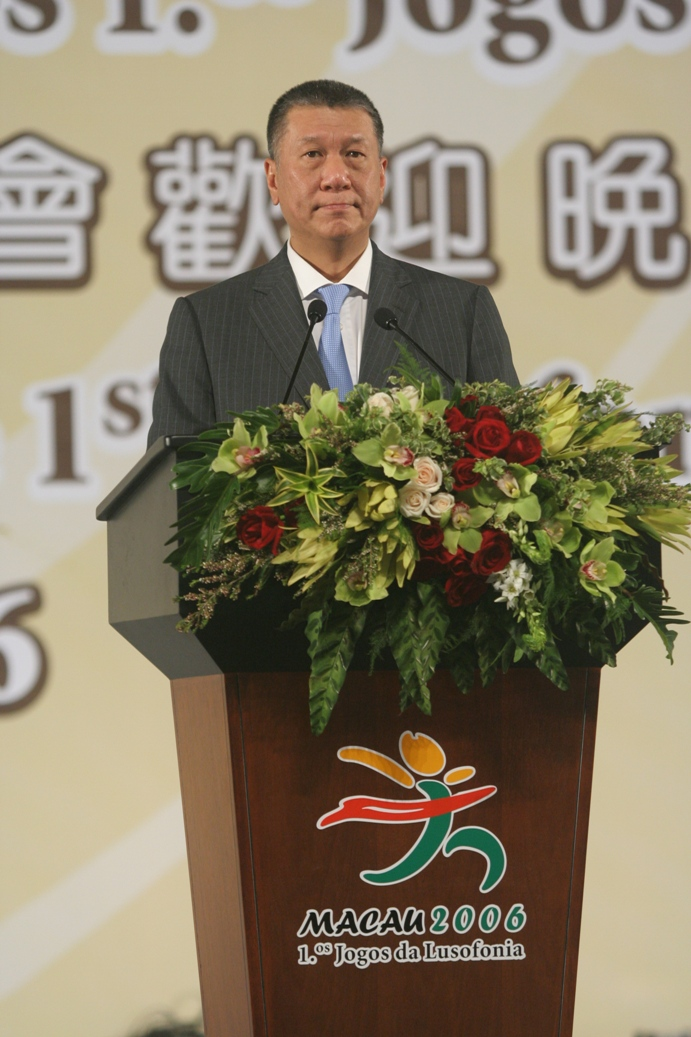
- Date formed: 20 December 2004
- Date dissolved: 20 December 2009

People and organisations
- Head of government: Edmund Ho Hau Wah
- Total no. of members: 6
- Member party: Nonpartisan

History
- Elections: 29 August 2004
- Legislature terms: 7th, 8th, 9th
- Predecessor: Edmund Ho I
- Successor: Fernando Chui I

The Second term of Edmund Ho Hau Wah as Chief Executive of Macau, officially considered part of "The 2nd term Chief Executive of Macau", relates to the period of governance of Macau since the transfer of sovereignty over Macau, between 20 December 2004 and 20 December 2009. Edmund Ho Hau Wah was reelected in mid 2004 by 300-member Selection Committee.

== Cabinet ==
=== Ministry ===
The policy bureaux were under several reorganisations during the term as following:

Portfolio	Minister	Took office	Left office	Party	Ref
Chief Executive	Edmund Ho Hau Wah	20 December 2004	20 December 2009	Nonpartisan	
Secretary for Administration and Justice	Florinda da Rosa Silva Chan	20 December 2004	Chui I	Nonpartisan	
Secretary for Economy and Finance	Francis Tam Pak Yuen	20 December 2004	Chui I	Nonpartisan	
Secretary for Security	Cheong Kuoc Vá	20 December 2004	Chui I	Nonpartisan	
Secretary for Social Affairs and Culture	Fernando Chui Sai On	20 December 2004	12 May 2009	Nonpartisan	
Secretary for Social Affairs and Culture	Edmund Ho Hau Wah	12 May 2009	20 December 2009	Nonpartisan	
Secretary for Transport and Public Works	Ao Man Long	20 December 2004	6 December 2006	Nonpartisan	
Secretary for Transport and Public Works	Edmund Ho Hau Wah	6 December 2006	13 February 2007	Nonpartisan	
Secretary for Transport and Public Works	Lau Si Io	13 February 2007	Chui I	Nonpartisan	

=== Executive Council members ===
The Executive Council was presided by President Edmund Ho Hau Wah and consisted of total 10 members. All members are appointed by the Chief Executive from among members of the Legislative Council and other influential public personnels.

The Convenor of the members was Tang Chi Kin.

Members	Affiliation	Portfolio	Took Office	Left Office	Ref
Florinda da Rosa Silva Chan	Nonpartisan	Secretary for Administration and Justice	20 December 2004	Chui I	
Tong Chi Kin	Nonpartisan	Convenor of the ExCo; Chairman of the Science and Technology Development Fund	20 December 2004	Chui I	
Leong Heng Teng	UPP	Member of the Legislative Assembly	20 December 2004	Chui I	
Liu Chak Wan	Nonpartisan	Chairman of New Tenhon Investment	20 December 2004	Chui I	
Alexandre Ma Iao Lai	Nonpartisan	President of Macau China-Africa Business Council	20 December 2004	Chui I	
Ho Iat Seng	UIEM	Member of the Legislative Assembly	20 December 2004	20 October 2009	
Leonel Alberto Alves	UIPM	Member of the Legislative Assembly	20 December 2004	Chui I	
Cheang Chi Keong	UIEM	Member of the Legislative Assembly	20 December 2004	Chui I	
Lam Heong Sang	CCCAE	Chairman of CCCAE	20 December 2004	20 December 2009	
Lionel Leong Vai Tac	Nonpartisan	CEO of Seng San Enterprises; Chairman of the Smartable Holding	20 December 2004	Chui I	

== See also ==
- First term of Edmund Ho as Chief Executive of Macau

Preceded by Ho I	Government of Macau; 2004-2009	Succeeded by Chui I
