= First term of Edmund Ho as Chief Executive of Macau =

First term of Edmund Ho Hau Wah as Chief Executive of Macau Cabinet
- 1st Cabinet of Macau

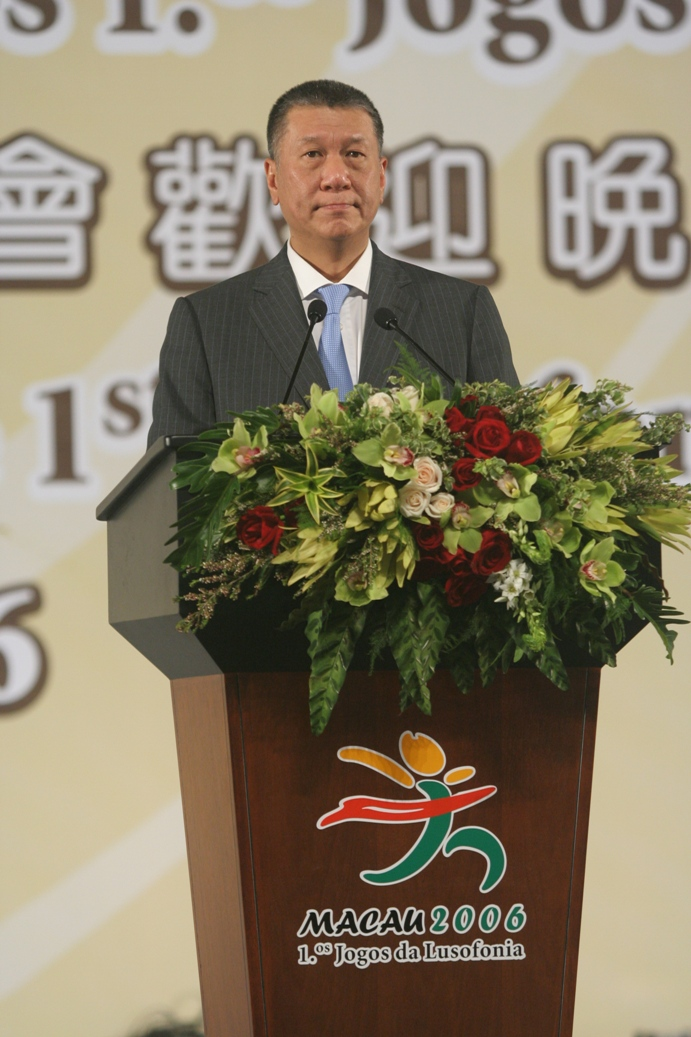
- Date formed: 20 December 1999
- Date dissolved: 20 December 2004

People and organisations
- Head of government: Edmund Ho Hau Wah
- Total no. of members: 5
- Member party: Nonpartisan

History
- Elections: 15 May 1999
- Legislature terms: 6th, 7th
- Predecessor: Rocha Vieira II
- Successor: Edmund Ho II

The First term of Edmund Ho Hau Wah as Chief Executive of Macau, officially considered part of "The 1st term Chief Executive of Macau", relates to the period of governance of Macau since the transfer of sovereignty over Macau, between 20 December 1999 and 20 December 2004. Edmund Ho Hau Wah was elected in early 1999 by 200-member Selection Committee as the first Chief Executive of Macau.

== Cabinet ==
=== Ministry ===
Portfolio	Minister	Took office	Left office	Party	Ref
Chief Executive	Edmund Ho Hau Wah	20 December 1999	Ho II	Nonpartisan	
Secretary for Administration and Justice	Florinda da Rosa Silva Chan	20 December 1999	Ho II	Nonpartisan	
Secretary for Economy and Finance	Francis Tam Pak Yuen	20 December 1999	Ho II	Nonpartisan	
Secretary for Security	Cheong Kuoc Vá	20 December 1999	Ho II	Nonpartisan	
Secretary for Social Affairs and Culture	Fernando Chui Sai On	20 December 1999	Ho II	Nonpartisan	
Secretary for Transport and Public Works	Ao Man Long	20 December 1999	Ho II	Nonpartisan	

=== Executive Council members ===
The Executive Council was presided by President Edmund Ho Hau Wah and consisted of total 10 members. All members are appointed by the Chief Executive from among members of the Legislative Council and other influential public personnels.

The Convenor of the members was Tang Chi Kin.

Members	Affiliation	Portfolio	Took Office	Left Office	Ref
Florinda da Rosa Silva Chan	Nonpartisan	Secretary for Administration and Justice	20 December 1999	Ho II	
Tong Chi Kin	Nonpartisan politician	Convenor of the ExCo; Chairman of the Science and Technology Development Fund	20 December 1999	Ho II	
Francis Tam Pak Yuen	Nonpartisan politician	Secretary for Economy and Finance	20 December 1999	20 December 2004	
Cheong Kuoc Vá	Nonpartisan politician	Secretary for Security	20 December 1999	20 December 2004	
Fernando Chui Sai On	Nonpartisan politician	Secretary for Social Affairs and Culture	20 December 1999	20 December 2004	
Ao Man Long	Nonpartisan politician	Secretary for Transport and Public Works	20 December 1999	20 December 2004	
Victor Ng Wing Lok	Nonpartisan politician	President of the Macau Foundation	20 December 1999	20 December 2004	
Leong Heng Teng	UPP	Member of the Legislative Assembly	20 December 1999	Ho II	
Liu Chak Wan	Nonpartisan politician	Chairman of New Tenhon Investment	20 December 1999	Ho II	
Alexandre Ma Iao Lai	Nonpartisan politician	President of Macau China-Africa Business Council	20 December 1999	Ho II	

Preceded by Rocha Vieira II as Governor of Macau	Government of Macau; 1999–2004	Succeeded by Ho II
