= Legal system of Macau =

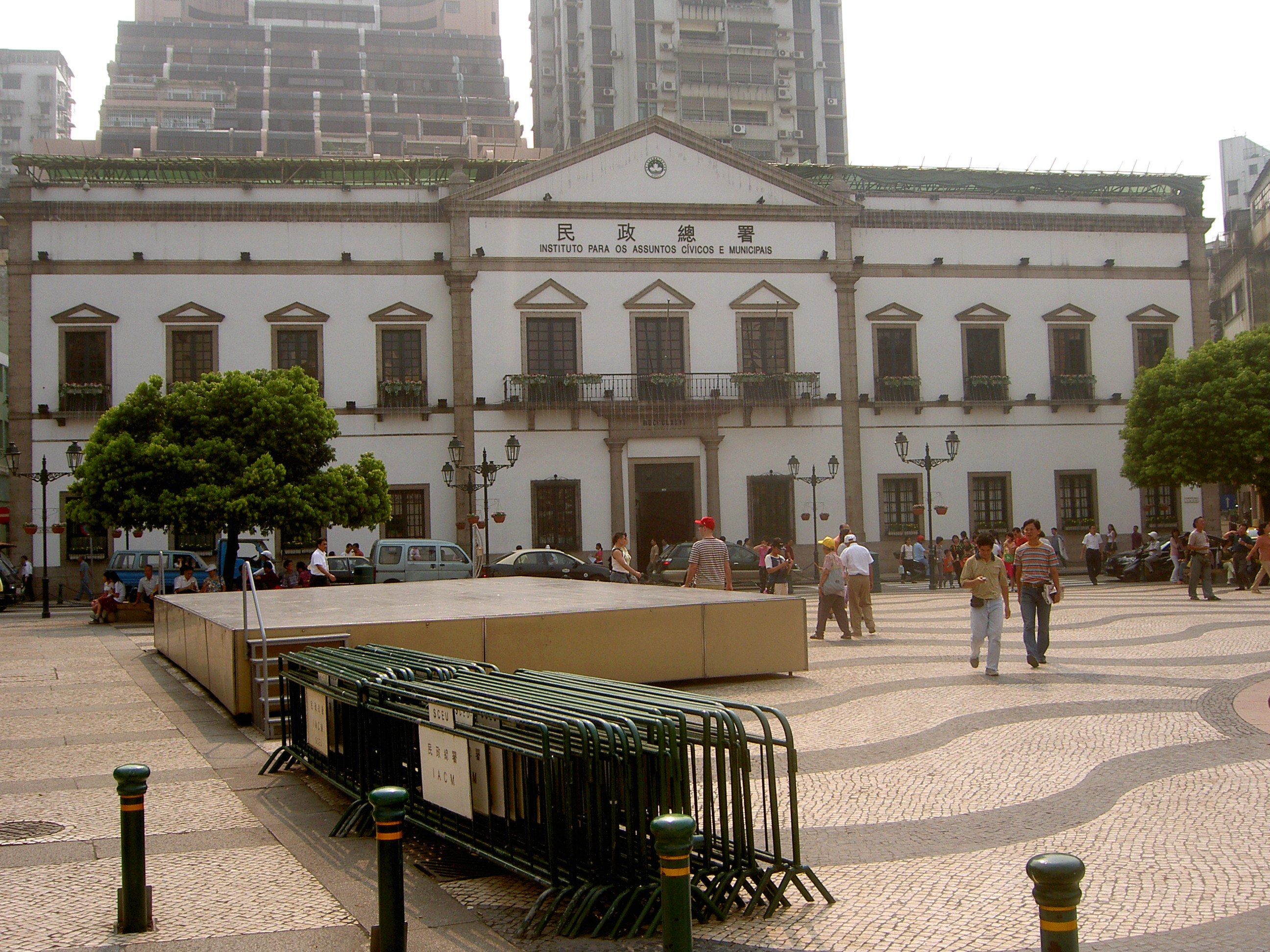
Former Senate of Macau

Macau law is broadly based on Portuguese law, and therefore part of the civil law tradition of continental European legal systems. Portuguese law is itself highly influenced by German law. However, many other influences are present, including Chinese law, Italian law, and some narrow aspects of common law.

Macau's legal code is written in Portuguese; therefore law students at University of Macau take their classes in Portuguese.

== Constitutional law ==
The apex of the legal system is the Basic Law of the Macau SAR, a Chinese law approved in accordance with and due to the Sino-Portuguese Joint Declaration on the Question of Macau (an international treaty that is officially deposited at the UN) and with article 31 of the Constitution of the PRC. Within Macau, the Basic Law has constitutional rank. The Basic Law of Macau is modelled upon the Basic Law of Hong Kong, although it is not totally equal, as it namely is influenced by the Portuguese Constitution in some points as, for example, in some norms concerning fundamental rights. The International Covenant on Civil and Political Rights applies in Macau.

== The transfer of power ==
The legal system of Macau was not substantially modified in 1999, as a result of the transfer of power from Portugal to the PRC, given that there is a principle of continuity of the pre-existing legal system, according to which all sources in force prior to the transfer of sovereignty continued to apply, with some minor exceptions that were specified in December 1999.

== Judicial system ==
The courts of the Macau SAR are structured in three levels and have final power of adjudication, except in very narrow areas. The Court of Final Appeal has three judges, and the Court of Second Instance has five judges. Trial by jury is foreseen in the law, but is not used.

Prior to 1991, Macau judicial system was a sub-judiciary district (Comarca de Macau) of the judicial framework of the Portuguese legal system and was affiliated to the Judiciary District of Lisbon (Distrito Judicial de Lisboa).

By 2018 none of the criminal court judges were Portuguese. In 2018 Reuters stated: "Courts have largely stopped providing Portuguese translations."

== High Court ==
The Higher Court of Justice (Superior Court of Justice) of Macau replaced the role of Court of Appeal of the Judiciary District of Lisbon. This highest court would be replaced by the current Court of Appeal in 1999.

The courts prior to the handover in 1999:

- Superior Council of Magistrates
- Superior Council of Public Prosecutors
- Court of Justice of Macau
- Criminal Preliminary Hearing Court of Macau
- Administrative Court of Macau
- Constitutional Court of the Republic of Portugal
- Supreme Administrative Court of the Republic of Portugal
- Supreme Court of Justice of the Republic of Portugal
- Audit Court of the Republic of Portugal

The courts of Macau consist of:

- Court of Final Appeal (終審法院, Tribunal de Ultima Instância)
- Court of Second Instance or Court of Appeal (中級法院, Tribunal de Segunda Instância)
- Primary Court of Macau – (初級法院, Tribunal Judícial de Base)
- Criminal Preliminary Hearing Court (刑事起訴法庭, Juizos de Instrução Criminal)
- Administrative Court (行政法院, Tribunal Administrativo)
- Independent Commission for the Nomination of Judges (推薦法官的獨立委員會, Comissão Independente para a Indigitação de Juízes)
- Judiciary Council of Macau (法官委員會, Conselho dos Magistrados Judíciais)
- Office of the President of the Court of Final Appeal (終審法院院長辦公室, Gabinete do Presidente do Tribunal de Última Instância)

== Civil law legal system ==
Macau is typically a civil law legal system, in that legislation is the main source of law and case law, while clearly relevant, is not a major source of law. Macau has the five 'classic' codifications: the Civil Code, the Commercial Code, the Civil Procedure Code, the Penal Code, the Criminal Procedure Code. In addition, there are a number of other smaller codifications (e.g., in the field of administrative law).

== Private law ==
Private law in Macau is basically codified in two separate codes: the 1999 Civil Code and the 1999 Commercial code. A number of other pieces of legislation, such as the law on standard contract terms, are also of importance. The Commercial Code has been translated into English and is freely available in the website of the Macau Official Printing House (see link below). For a partial translation of the Civil Code, see the bibliography below.

== Legal education ==
The Faculty of Law of the University of Macau was created in the late 1980s and currently offers law degrees and master programmes conducted in Chinese and Portuguese languages. It also offers two master and postgraduate programmes in English, one in EU, international and comparative law, and the other in international business law . In addition, it offers PhD programs in law.

== Legal Department ==
The Public Prosecutions Office (檢察院; Ministério Público) is the judicial authority of Macau. It is led by a prosecutor general and assisted by an assistant-prosecutor general. Day to day legal activities are performed by general prosecutors.

== Gaming law ==
Macau gaming law is discussed in a separate entry.

== Law field employees ==
In 2018 Macau had 49 jurists, with ten percent being Portuguese. Reuters stated in 2018 that according to "experts", "the government was increasingly hiring only Chinese for jobs as lawyers, advisers and jurists."

== See also ==
- Legal systems of the world
- Civil law (legal system)
- Civil code
- Commercial code
- Immigration to Macau
