= 2014 Macanese Chief Executive referendum =

Macanese Chief Executive referendum, 2014
- 24–31 August 2014
- Voting system: Simple majority, online voting

Should the Chief Executive of Macau be elected by universal suffrage in 2019?
Yes	96%
No	4%

Do you have confidence in the sole candidate in the Chief Executive Election 2014 Chui Sai On Fernando becoming the Chief Executive?
Yes	11%
No	89%

An unofficial two-part referendum on the Chief Executive of Macau was held in August 2014. Organised by Macau Conscience, Macao Youth Dynamics and Open Macau Society, it asked whether voters supported reforming how the Chief Executive was elected and whether they had confidence in Fernando Chui, the sole candidate in the 2014 election. Following the organisers' announcement of the proposed referendum, the Macau Government and the Macau Liaison Office issued statements condemning the referendum as "illegal and unconstitutional". Members of the organising committee and volunteers of the referendum were arrested by the police. Despite the forced closure of physical polling stations, the referendum went ahead online between 24 August 2014 and 31 August 2014. The organisers announced that 8,688 (96%) voted in favour of universal suffrage for the 2019 election and 7,762 (89%) voted having no confidence in Fernando Chui.

== Motions ==
On 1 August 2014, the organisers announced the referendum questions.

- Motion 1: Should the Chief Executive of Macau be elected by universal suffrage in 2019?
  - Option A: Yes;
  - Option B: No;
  - Option C: Abstention
- Motion 2: Do you have confidence in the sole candidate in the Chief Executive Election 2014 Chui Sai On Fernando becoming the Chief Executive?
  - Option A: Yes;
  - Option B: No;
  - Option C: Abstention

== Banned promotion ==
The Civic and Municipal Affairs Bureau (IACM), the predecessor of Municipal Affairs Bureau, rejected the organisers' venue application to set up stalls in public places to promote the referendum. The IACM said the referendum "challenges and damages the national constitution and the Basic Law". The Open Macau Society appealed the IACM's decision to the Court of Final Appeal. The Court declared itself having no jurisdiction over the case and refused to rule on the legality of the civil referendum. According to Jason Chao, the Court's decision effectively upheld the IACM's ban on setting up booths in public spaces to promote the referendum.
