= 2014 Macanese Chief Executive election =

- 31 August 2014

All 400 votes of the Election Committee 201 votes needed to win
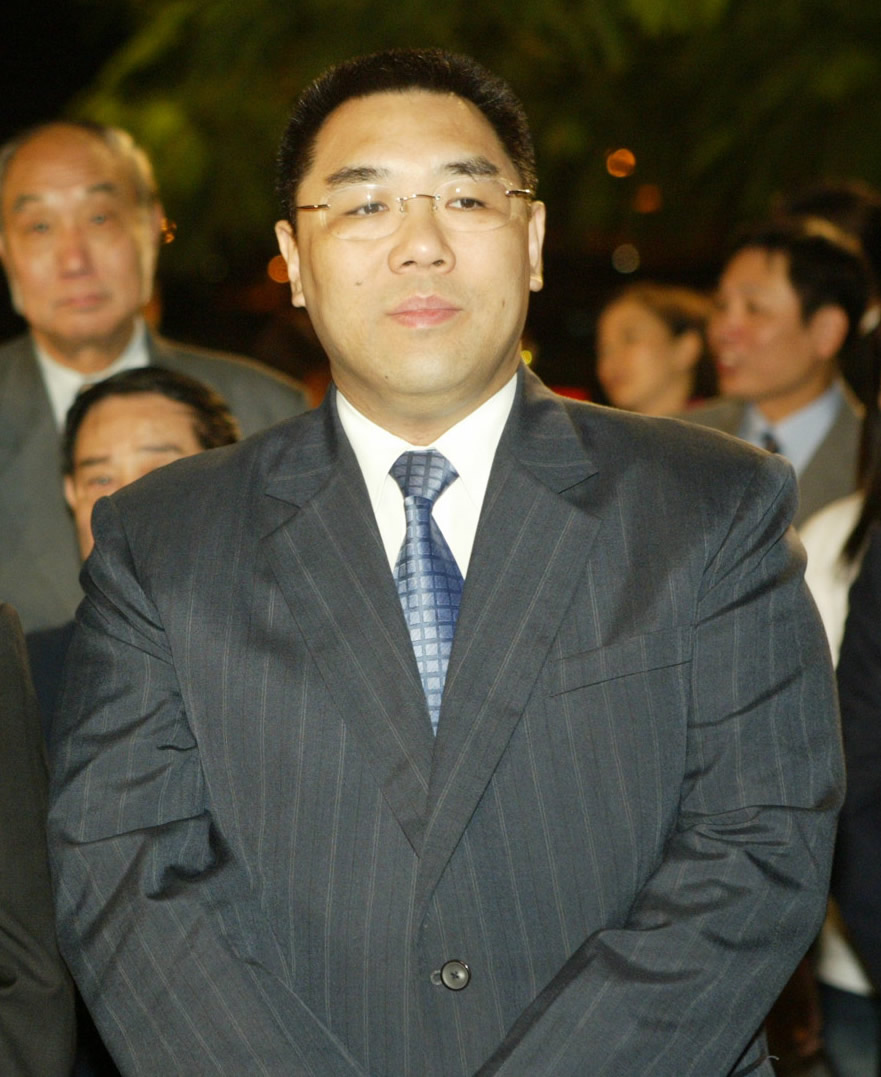
Candidate	Fernando Chui
Party	Independent
Alliance	Pro-Beijing
Electoral vote	380
Chief Executive before election
Fernando Chui
Independent
Elected Chief Executive
Fernando Chui
Independent

Chief Executive elections were held in Macau on 31 August 2014 for the fourth term of the Chief Executive of Macau (CE), the highest office of the Macau Special Administrative Region. Incumbent Chief Executive Fernando Chui was re-elected unopposed.

== Background ==
On the 16 July 2014 current Chief Executive Fernando Chui Sai-on announced his bid for reelection for CE office and promised "a relatively radical change" within his government. No other candidates has announced any intention to run for the CE office. On the 21 July, CE Fernando Chui Sai On was able to secure more than 66 electoral colleges, which the threshold raised from 50 in the last election following the expansion of Election Committee.

== Candidates ==
- Fernando Chui: Incumbent Chief Executive

== Civil vote ==
During the election New Macau Association held rallies against the small circle undemocratic CE election. Macau Conscience, Macau Youth Dynamics and Open Macau Society organised 2014 Macanese Chief Executive referendum at which 7,762 (89%) voted having no confidence in the sole candidate Fernando Chui and 8,259 (95%) voted in favour of universal suffrage for the 2019 election. The referendum was deemed illegal and breached of privacy by the Government of Macau.

== Results ==
On 31 August 2014, Fernando Chui Sai-on was re-elected unopposed with total of 380 electoral college with 95.96% of total votes. 3 members of the Election Committee were absent and 1 was late. Chui promised to take opinions from more public and civil group, and will fulfill all he promises during his campaign. However he stayed muted about the new secretaries.

Candidate	Party	Votes	%
Fernando Chui	Independent	380	100.00
Total		380	100.00
Valid votes		380	95.96
Invalid votes		3	0.76
Blank votes		13	3.28
Total votes		396	100.00
Registered voters/turnout		400	99.00
Source: General Audit Committee
