= 1999 Macanese Chief Executive election =

15 May 1999	2004 →
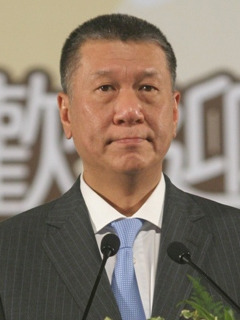

Candidate	Edmund Ho	Stanley Au
Party	Independent	Independent
Alliance	Pro-Beijing	N/A
Electoral vote	163	34
Percentage	82.74%	17.26%
Leader before election
Vasco Joaquim Rocha Vieira
as Governor of Macau
Independent
Elected Chief Executive
Edmund Ho
Independent

Chief Executive elections were held in Macau on 15 May 1999 to elect the first Chief Executive (CE), the highest office of the Macau Special Administrative Region, before Macau was due to be handed back to China by Portugal. Edmund Ho was elected as the first leader of the Macau SAR. This was the only contested Chief Executive election to date.

== Candidates ==
- Edmund Ho Hau-wah, former member of the Selection Committee of Macau Special Administrative Region Government
- Stanley Au Chong-kit, former member of the Selection Committee of Macau Special Administrative Region Government

== Results ==
Candidate	Party	Votes	%
Edmund Ho	Independent	163	82.74
Stanley Au	Independent	34	17.26
Total		197	100.00
Valid votes		197	98.99
Invalid votes		0	0.00
Blank votes		2	1.01
Total votes		199	100.00
Registered voters/turnout		200	99.50
Source: China.cn

== Reactions ==
Edmund Ho thanked the Selection Committee and Macanese residents for their support after elected as Chief Executive and vowed to uphold "One Country Two Systems" framework. Governor of Macau Vasco Joaquim Rocha Vieira, the then-leader of the city, congratulated Ho's win and promised a smooth handover of sovereignty.

Despite some regarded Au as a democrat challenging the one-man election, Stanley Au was later appointed to the Legislative Assembly by Ho after SAR established, and joined Chinese People's Political Consultative Conference in 2005. In 2019, Au described his bid, which made the only contested Chief Executive election in Macau as of now, as naïve.
