= Paula Ling =

Chinese lawyer and politician

Paula Ling Hsiao Yun is a Portuguese-born Chinese lawyer and politician in Macau. She was elected the deputy to represent Macau in the National People's Congress (China's legislature) in 2008, has served on the committee to select Macau's Chief Executive, on the committee for Macau's Basic Law, and on Macau's Election Committee. In 2020, Macau Business listed her as one of the twenty most influential women in Macau.

== Biography ==
Ling was born into a Chinese family that was originally from Zhejiang but later settled in Portugal, in the Azores autonomous region, on Terceira Island. She moved to Macau in 1977, and was one of the first students to enroll and study law at the University of Macau (then known as the University of East Asia). She has resided in Macau since, and speaks Portuguese and Chinese.

== Career ==
She has been engaged in private practice as a lawyer since 1995, but has been also active in politics since the establishment of Macau as a Chinese autonomous region in 1999. She was a member of several key committees constituted to facilitate the establishment of the special administrative region of Macau, including the Preparatory Committee for the Macau Special Administrative Region, the Committee for the Basic Law of the Macao S.A.R, and the Selection Committee of the Chief Executive of the Macao S.A.R.

She was elected deputy to represent Macau in the National People's Congress (China's legislature) in 2008, and continues to serve as a representative, winning a re-election in 2018. In 2016, as a delegate to the Congress, she advocated for equalizing maternity leave for female representatives. She is also active in the regulation of the legal profession in Macau, and was elected chair of the Macau Lawyers Superior Council as well as serving as a member of the Macau Lawyers Association's committee. She endorsed the nomination of Ho Lat-seng for the position of Chief Executive of Macau. She is on the board of the Macau Polytechnic University. She has also engaged in philanthropic work as the vice-chairwoman of the Women's General Association of Macau.

In 2020, Macau Business listed her as one of the twenty most influential women in Macau.
