= Scheme $6,000 =

Scheme $6,000 (Chinese: $6,000計劃) is a 2011 Hong Kong Government tax rebate program that gave out HK$6,000 to all adult holders of a Hong Kong permanent identity card, in a bid to "藏富於民" (Leave wealth with the people).

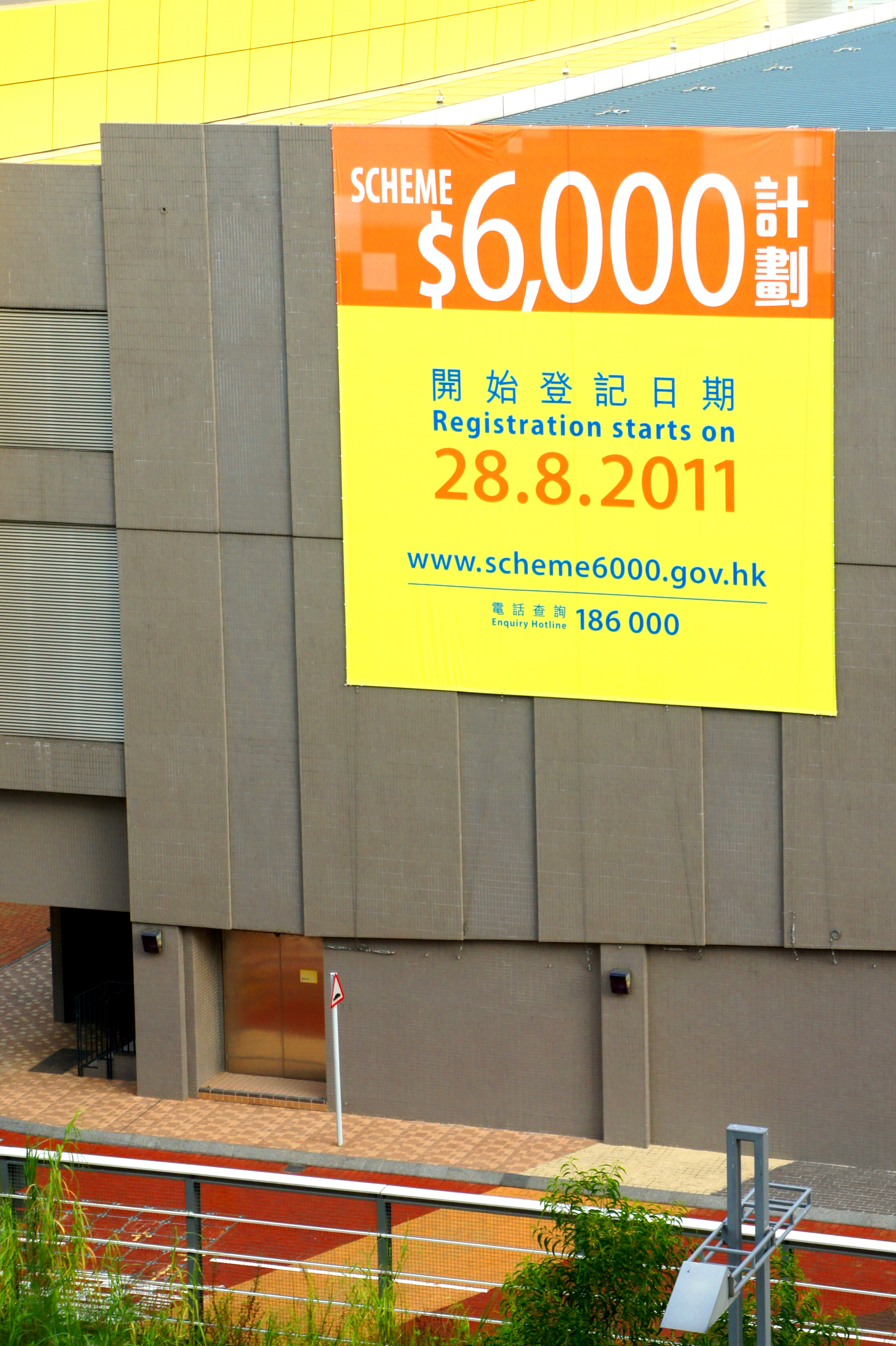
Outdoor poster advertising Scheme $6,000

== Background ==
After seven consecutive years of budget surplus, the Hong Kong Government held a record HK$579 billion in reserve during the 2011 financial year. Under pressure to use the money to do more for the elderly and the poor, Financial Secretary John Tsang announced in the 2011–2012 budget on 23 February 2011 a scheme modelled from the 2008–2009 financial year, whereby HK$6,000 were to be deposited into the Mandatory Provident Fund (MPF) account of every Hong Kong resident whose average monthly income is less than HK$10,000, in a bid to strengthen the public post-retirement prospect. This scheme was estimated to cost the government HK$24 billion.

Dissatisfaction over the proposal led to public criticism and a series of complaints, including the charge that "遠水不能救近火" (Water from afar cannot extinguish fires), along with concern over high MPF management fees. Bipartisanship pressures from members of the Legislative Council of Hong Kong called for a modification of the proposal to make direct cash payment to the public, similar to the Wealth Partaking Scheme operated by the Government of Macau since 2008.

On 2 March 2011, Tsang announced Scheme $6,000 cancelling the original proposed MPF plan. The estimated cost of the scheme is HK$36 billion. Despite this, public anger were not entirely satisfied leading to the 2011 Hong Kong anti-budget demonstration four days later.

== Eligibility ==
All persons age 18 or over on 31 March 2012, and hold a valid Hong Kong permanent identity card issued on or after 23 June 2003 are eligible to register. If the person does not hold a valid identity card, they must either hold a Certificate of Exemption under the Registration of Persons Regulations, or have submitted application for Verification of Eligibility for Permanent Identity Card. There is no requirement of current residence in Hong Kong. Approximately 6.1 million people are estimated to be eligible under these criteria.

== Taxation ==
Recipients of payments under Scheme $6,000 are not required to pay Hong Kong tax on the amount received. With regards to recipients who are tax residents of Canada, the Canada Revenue Agency states that the payment is a windfall which is not subject to Canadian income tax. However, Hong Kong residents who hold United States citizenship are required to pay U.S. income tax on the HK$6,000 received even if they reside in Hong Kong rather than the U.S., as according to the Internal Revenue Service it does not qualify as a gift from the Hong Kong government, nor earned income which could be excluded under the foreign earned income exclusion, nor a distribution based on need which could be excluded from gross income under the general welfare exclusion.

== Timetable ==
Registration for Scheme $6,000 runs in two phases from 28 August 2011 to 31 December 2012.

=== First phase ===
The first phase runs from 28 August 2011 to 31 March 2012, with each registered person receiving HK$6,000. Initial registration was staggered in batches base on five different age groups.

1. Born on or before 1946: register on or after 28 August 2011
2. 1947–1956: register on or after 11 September 2011
3. 1957–1966: register on or after 25 September 2011
4. 1967–1981: register on or after 9 October 2011
5. 1982–1993: register on or after 23 October 2011

Registrations submitted early were not processed until the scheduled registration date.

=== Second phase ===
Those who did not register during the first phase are eligible to receive an extra HK$200 for delaying registration until the second phase. This extra amount is not however given to those who turned 18 years old after the first phase has started.

== Registration and payment ==
Registration can be made for payment through local banks or the Hongkong Post. Registration forms may be downloaded from the official website, collected from offices or centres of Home Affairs Department, Social Welfare Department, Hong Kong Housing Authority, post offices, and banks.

=== Through local banks ===
Anyone registering through local banks must hold a Hong Kong dollar savings or current account in their sole name. Payments are made by electronic transfer to the designated account. Paper registration form may be obtained from 21 designated retail banks.

- Bank of China (Hong Kong) (Note: Registration can be made through e-banking.)
- Bank of Communications
- Bank of East Asia
- China Construction Bank (Asia)
- Chiyu Banking Corporation
- Chong Hing Bank
- Citibank
- CITIC Bank International
- Dah Sing Bank
- DBS Bank (Hong Kong)
- Fubon Bank
- Hang Seng Bank
- The Hongkong and Shanghai Banking Corporation
- Industrial and Commercial Bank of China (Asia)
- MEVAS Bank
- Nanyang Commercial Bank
- Public Bank (Hong Kong)
- Shanghai Commercial Bank
- Standard Chartered Bank (Hong Kong)
- Wing Hang Bank
- Wing Lung Bank

A number of banks with international subsidiaries in countries with large emigrate Chinese population, such as Bank of China and HSBC, operated schemes to allow expatriates to open Hong Kong based accounts for the purpose of collecting their money without returning to Hong Kong.

=== Through Hongkong Post ===
Payments are made in the form of cheques to be collected by the individual from a designated post office, to be deposited into a local bank account or encashed at branches of Standard Chartered Bank.

== Progress ==
As of November 2011, approximately 4 million people have registered to receive payment.

== Caring and Sharing Scheme ==
The Hong Kong government announced a similar program called the "Caring and Sharing Scheme" in March 2018. The relevant eligibility criteria are more restrictive and the amount payable is HK$4,000 per adult.

== Cash Payout Scheme ==
The Hong Kong government announced a similar program called the "Cash Payout Scheme" in February 2020. The amount payable is HK$10,000 per adult. Payments will begin in July 2020.

== See also ==
- Basic income
