= 2004 Macanese Chief Executive election =

← 1999	29 August 2004	2009 →

All 300 votes of the Election Committee 151 votes needed to win
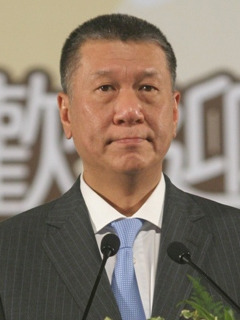
Candidate	Edmund Ho
Party	Independent
Alliance	Pro-Beijing
Electoral vote	296
Chief Executive before election
Edmund Ho
Independent
Elected Chief Executive
Edmund Ho
Independent

Chief Executive elections were held in Macau on 29 August 2004 for the second term of the Chief Executive of Macau (CE), the highest office of the Macau Special Administrative Region. Incumbent Chief Executive Edmund Ho was re-elected unopposed.

== Candidates ==
- Edmund Ho, incumbent Chief Executive of Macau

== Results ==
Ho was elected with nearly 99% of electoral votes.

Candidate	Party	Votes	%
Edmund Ho	Independent	296	100.00
Total		296	100.00
Valid votes		296	99.00
Invalid votes		0	0.00
Blank votes		3	1.00
Total votes		299	100.00
Registered voters/turnout		300	99.67
Source: Electoral Affairs Commission
