= Lionel Leong =

Politician in Macao, China

Lionel Leong Leong Vai Tac
- 梁維特
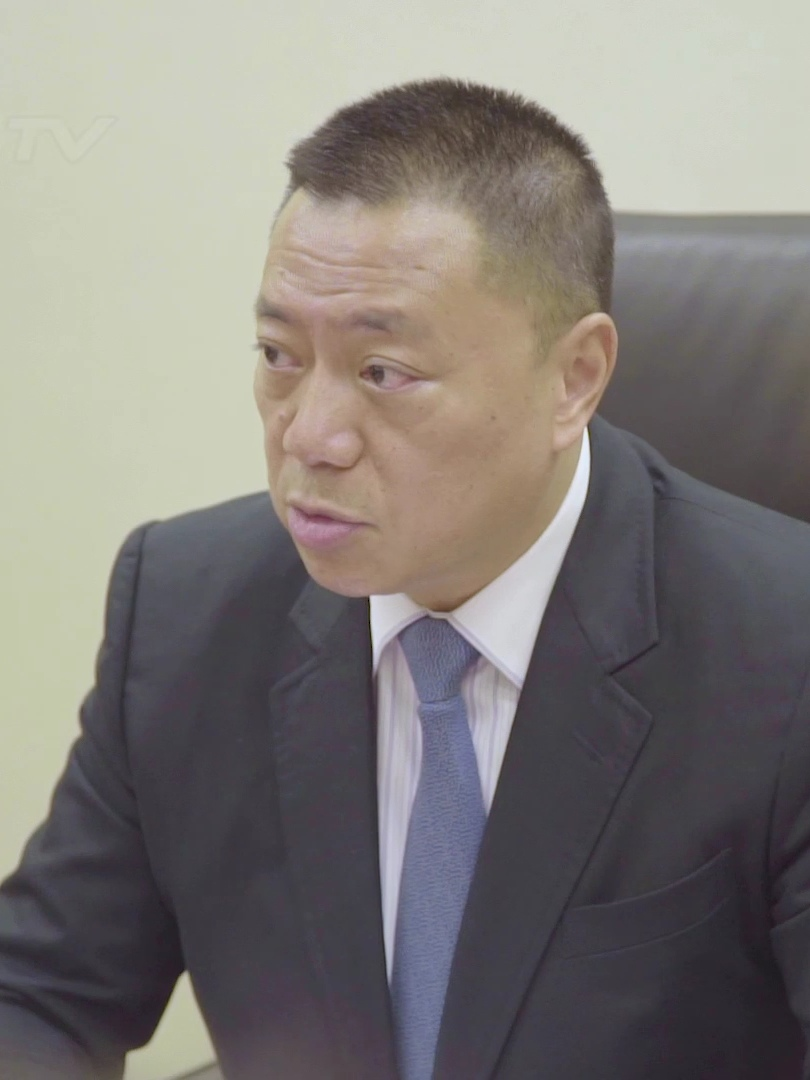

Member of the Council of Advisors (COA) and; the Executive Chairman of the Presidium of the International Science, Technology and Innovation Forum (ISTIF) of the Boao Forum for Asia (BFA)
- In office 2020–Present

Personal details
- Born: June 1962 (age 64) Portuguese Macau
- Education: Peking University China
- Occupation: Retired
- Profession: Member of the Council of Advisors (COA); Executive Chairman of the Presidium of the International Science, Technology and Innovation Forum (ISTIF) of the Boao Forum for Asia; Chairman of the Macao Committee for Guangdong-Hong Kong-Macao Greater Bay Area (GBA) Development; Vice President of the International Finance Forum (IFF); Board Member of Mota-Engil Group (listed on EURONEXT LISBON PTMENOAE0005); Deputy to the 11th & 12th National People’s Congress (NPC); Member of the China, Asia Pacific Group of the Trilateral Commission

Lionel Leong or Leong Vai Tac (Chinese: 梁維特; born June 1962) is a political figure of the Macao Special Administrative Region of the People's Republic of China.

Leong holds a Doctor of Law degree from Peking University of China, and a Bachelor of Mathematics from University of Waterloo in Canada. He is the Member of the Council of Advisors (COA) and the Executive Chairman of the Presidium of the International Science, Technology and Innovation Forum (ISTIF) of the Boao Forum for Asia. He is also Chairman of the Macao Committee for Guangdong-Hong Kong-Macao Greater Bay Area (GBA) Development. As well as being the Vice President of the International Finance Forum (IFF) and the Founding President of Macau Development Strategy Research Center. On 30 August 2024, Leong was elected as an Independent Director of China State Construction Engineering Corporation Limited. He is also a Board Member of the Mota-Engil Group. He was inaugurated as the 4th Secretary of Economy and Finance the of Macao Special Administrative Region (MSAR) and has been in the post since 20 December 2014. He was also one of the MSAR delegates to the 11th and 12th National People's Congress. He was also a member of the 9th Chinese People's Political Consultative Conference Hebei Provincial Committee. He was a member of the Council for the Election of Deputies of MSAR to the 9th – 13th National People's Congress. He was a member of China in the Asia Pacific Group of the Trilateral Commission. He was also a member of the Selection Committee for the first MSAR Government. He was a member of the Election Committee of the MSAR Chief Executive in 2004, 2009 and 2014. He was also a member of the 2nd and 3rd Executive Council of the MSAR while also being a member of the University Assembly of University of Macau, a member of the Board of Trustees of Macao Foundation, the Vice Chairman of the Macao Advisory Council on the Environment, a member of the Evaluation Committee of Macao Science and Technology Awards. He also became President of the Digital & Information Technology Committee of Macau Productivity and Technology Transfer Center. He also gained membership of the Board of Trustees of the Macao Cultural Industries Fund while being President of Macau Development Strategy Research Centre. Leong is also Chairman of the Advisory Board of the Macau Economic Association, he was also Director General of Charity Fund From the Readers of Macao Daily News and the President of Pan Mac Junior Chamber and Vice President of the Kiang Wu Hospital Charitable Association, etc. He is the recipient of the Honorable Medal of Golden Lotus Flower in 2020 and also the Medal of Merit – Industry and Commerce awarded by the Macao SAR Government in 2001.

== Education ==
Leong went to Instituto Salesiano de Macau for his high school and continued with his studies in Canada in 1977. In 1983, he graduated with a bachelor's degree in mathematics from University of Waterloo, Canada. He later continued his academic journey at Peking University in China, where he recently obtained his Ph.D. in finance and economics.

== Family ==
Born in June 1962 in Macau, of a family from Yunfu City, Guangdong Province, Leong is married with two sons and one daughter. His father is a veterinarian while his mother is a housewife; and he has a younger sister. His grandfather, Doctor Chan Mun (陳滿) (1907-1990), was one of the leaders for the Macao New Democracy Movement in the 1940s and 50s and involved in the founding of "Xin Yuan Di" (新園地) (former body of Macao Daily News) acting as the Publisher. Doctor Chan had also held posts of the Chairman of the Board of Directors of Hou Kong Middle School, President of the Chinese Medical Association, and contributed to the works of Macau Tung Sin Tong Charitable Society and Macao Workers' Medical Clinic.

== Civil Service ==
=== Member, Council of Advisors, Boao Forum for Asia (BFA) ===
During the Council Meeting of the Boao Forum for Asia (BFA) on November 30, 2021, several decisions were made to enhance the effectiveness and representation of the Forum. One of these decisions was to expand the number of institutional directors on the Council, including strategic partner enterprises. This expansion aims to incorporate a wider range of perspectives and expertise in shaping the Forum's agenda and initiatives. Additionally, the Council agreed to appoint several individuals as members of the Forum's Advisory Board, including former Slovenian President Türk, former Finnish Prime Minister Aho, former United Nations Under-Secretary-General Akhtar, and former Secretary for Economy and Finance of the Macao SAR Government Leong Vai Tac. The inclusion of these individuals is expected to bring diverse experiences and insights to contribute to the Forum's strategic direction and policy recommendations.

=== Chairman, Macao Committee for Guangdong-Hong Kong-Macao Greater Bay Area Development, Boao Forum for Asia (BFA) ===
The Macao Committee for Guangdong-Hong Kong-Macao Greater Bay Area Development of the Boao Forum for Asia was established on November 10, 2020. This committee operates within the Macao SAR and aims to contribute to the development and integration of the Greater Bay Area. Leong, former Secretary for Economy and Finance of the Macao SAR Government, was appointed as the Chairman of the committee. The Committee works closely with stakeholders from various sectors to facilitate collaboration, foster innovation, and drive sustainable development within the region. Its establishment marks a step towards realizing the potential of the Greater Bay Area and harnessing its economic, social, and cultural strengths.

=== Secretary of Economy and Finance ===
On 30 November 2014, Leong was appointed by the State Council of the People's Republic of China as the 4th Secretary of Economy and Finance for MSAR. He believes that his most important responsibilities are to facilitate stable economic development, maintain MSAR's stability in finance and forex, support the development of SMEs, ensure local employment and promote moderate economic diversification development of the MSAR.

He had expressed that there will be promising prospects if MSAR continues to fully use well the policies from the Central Government, such as CEPA, Economic Cooperation between Guangdong and Macao, "One Centre One Platform" etc., and integrates the economic development of Macao into China's.

=== MSAR Executive Council ===
On 15 December 2004, he was appointed as the member of the 2nd Executive Council of MSAR.

On 1 December 2009, he was re-appointed as the member of the 3rd Executive Council of MSAR together with 7 other individuals including Leong Heng Teng and Liao Zeyun.

(Member List of the Executive Council of MSAR)

(The 2nd Executive Council)

Florinda da Rosa Silva Chan, Tong Chi Kin, Leong Heng Teng, Liao Zeyun, Ma Iao Lai, Ho Iat Seng, Leonel Alves, Cheang Chi Keong, Lam Heong Sang and Leong Vai Tac.

(The 3rd Executive Council)

Florinda da Rosa Silva Chan, Leong Heng Teng, Liao Zeyun, Ma Iao Lai, Leonel Alves, Cheang Chi Keong, Leong Vai Tac, Chan Meng Kam, Ho Sut Heng, Wong Yue Kai, Lam Kam Seng (appointed at 2013 year-end).

=== MSAR Committees ===
In 2009, he was appointed as the member of Macao Advisory Council on the Environment by the MSAR Government and was then elected by the members as the Vice Chairman. He was also the former President of the MSAR Environment Committee.

Leong also held the positions of the President of the Advisory Board of Macau Productivity and Technology Transfer Center, member of Board of Trustees of Macao Cultural Industries Fund, member of the Evaluation Committee of Macao Science and Technology Awards, Convener of Designated Project Team of MSAR Cultural Industry Committee.

== National People's Congress ==
=== Delegate to the 11th National People's Congress ===
On 27 January 2008, 319 members attended the Council for the Election of Deputies to the 11th National People's Congress. The members anonymously voted and elected 12 MSAR delegates among 17 nominees. The first-time nominated Leong Vai Tac was elected with a 95.9% of votes amongst 317 valid votes, Lao Ngai Leong was also elected with the same number of votes.

(List of MSAR delegates to 11th National People's Congress of the People's Republic of China)

Lei Pui Lam, Chio Ngan Ieng, Paula Ling Hsião Yun, Io Hong Meng, Kou Hoi In, Lok Po, Chui Sai Peng José, Leong Iok Wa, Leong Vai Tac, Ho Iat Seng, Lao Cheok Va and Lao Ngai Leong.

Standing Committee of the National People's Congress: Ho Iat Seng

=== Delegate to the 12th National People's Congress ===
On 17 December 2012, 359 members attended the second meeting of the Council for the Election of Deputies to the 12th National People's Congress and elected 12 MSAR delegates among 15 nominees. Leong Vai Tac was re-elected with a 95.14% votes amongst 350 valid votes.

(List of MSAR delegates to the 12th National People's Congress of the People's Republic of China)

Lei Pui Lam, Ho Sut Heng, Paula Hsião Yun Ling, Io Hong Meng, Kou Hoi In, Iong Weng Ian, Lok Po, Chui Sai Peng José, Leong Iok Wa, Lionel Leong Vai Tac, Ho Iat Seng, Lao Ngai Leong.

Standing Committee of the National People's Congress: Ho Iat Seng

== Chinese People's Political Consultative Conference ==
Leong Vai Tac was a member of the 9th Chinese People's Political Consultative Conference Hebei Provincial Committee.

== International Duties ==
Leong Vai Tac was a member of the China, Asia Pacific Group of the Trilateral Commission, and was the only person from Macau in the China group at the time. The Trilateral Commission is a non-governmental, policy-oriented forum that brings together leaders in their individual capacity from the worlds of business, government, academic, press and media, as well as civic society. The Commission offers a global platform for open dialogue, reaching out to those with different views and engaging with decision makers from around the world with the aim of finding solutions to the great geopolitical, economic and social challenges of the time.

Leong is also a Member of the Council of Advisors for the Boao Forum for Asia (BFA), a platform for economic and social dialogue in the Asia-Pacific region. Additionally, he holds the position of Chairman of the Macao Committee for Guangdong-Hong Kong-Macao Greater Bay Area Development within the Boao Forum for Asia (BFA), focusing on the development and integration of Macau within the regional context.

Leong serves as the Vice President of the International Finance Forum (IFF), reflecting his involvement in the finance and economic sectors.

== Community Duties ==
=== President of Macau Development Strategy Research Centre ===
Founding President of Macau Development Strategy Research Centre (Term: 1997-2014)

Leong founded Macau Development Strategy Research Centre together with several individuals from the industrial, commercial and academic sectors in November 1997, asserting to research on promoting Macao's long-term sustainable development through a scientific and responsible attitude. Previous research topics cover political talents, regional cooperation, middle class society, public administration reform, quality of residents, social economy, etc. Since 2002 until now, the research centre has been organising "Brainstorming for Macau" 「齊為澳門動腦筋」event every year, random events and discussion talks such as "Politics and Social Salon" 「時政沙龍」, as well as inviting guests from different sectors to share views on Macao's policy development.

=== (The 13th) President of the Charity Fund From the Readers of Macao Daily News ===
Charity Fund From the Readers of Macao Daily News was established in 1984 with the aim of "One for all, all for one". Every year on the second Sunday in December, the Fund organises "Walk for a Million" and raise funds for emergency issues, care for the needy, education and medical assistance to the poor, etc.

=== Pan Mac Junior Chamber ===
President of the Pan Mac Junior Chamber (1992)

Pan Mac Junior Chamber was established in 1984 and is one of the subsidiaries of Junior Chamber International Macao, China, aiming to encourage young people to create positive change by providing development opportunities.

== Career Background ==
After graduating from university in 1983, Leong returned to Macao but faced significant change in his family's financial situation. He had worked as a computer programmer, part-time evening school teacher, and was an apparel factory production department worker and sewing machine repair worker before promoted to manager within a year. When he left the apparel factory in 1987, he was manager of Sales department and Human Resources department.

In 1987, he bought by a 21-month instalment an apparel factory with only 30 workers. Since he had no excessive fund to purchase any quota under the "Quota System", he self developed the Japanese market which did not have quota limitation but well known for demanding very high standard product quality. In 1997, the factory expanded into Seng San Enterprises Limited and in 1999, moved to Concordia Industrial Park in Coloane. The company then focus on manufacturing world brands, producing over 3 million clothing every year and was known as one of the biggest garment manufacturers in Macao. It was also the first garment manufacturer in China accredited with ISO9000, ISO14000 and OHSAS18000 at the same time.

In 2001, Leong established Smartable Holding Limited and invested over MOP200 million to build a professional laundry of over 73,000 sq. ft. in Coloane in 2007, transforming from garment manufacturing to service chain downstream industry. The factory is in operation since 2009 and offers laundry services to international brand hotels in Macao.

Smartable Holding Limited has the capacity to service 30,000 hotel rooms and 110,000 uniforms daily, making it one of the highest productivity professional laundries globally, measured per square foot. The company received ISO 9001:2015 accreditation, becoming the first professional laundry company in Macau to achieve this recognition. In September 2016, the company expanded its services to include Macau's hospitals and health centers, and in 2022, it began providing services to Kiang Wu Private Hospital.

On 30 August 2024, Leong was elected as an Independent Director of China State Construction Engineering Corporation Limited. In 2022, Leong joined the Board of Mota-Engil Group, the 14th largest infrastructure and construction company in Europe. This appointment reflects his extensive knowledge and experience in the field.

== Merit ==
Leong is the recipient of the Honorable Medal of Golden Lotus Flower in 2020 first and Medal of Merit – Industry and Commerce awarded by the Macao SAR Government in 2001.

Preceded by Francis Tam Pak Yuen	Secretary of Economy and Finance of Macau; 2014-2019	Succeeded by Lei Wai Nong
