= Song Man Lei =

President of the Court of Final Appeal of Macau since 2024

- 宋敏莉
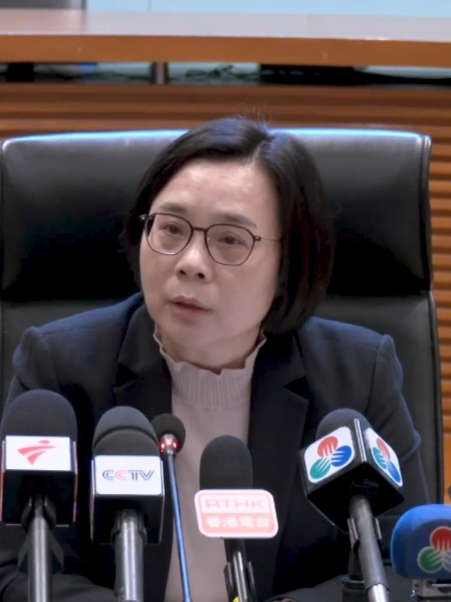
- Song in 2024

President of the Court of Final Appeal of Macau
- Incumbent
- Assumed office 2 December 2024
- Appointed by: Ho Iat Seng
- Preceded by: Sam Hou Fai

Judge of Court of Final Appeal (Macau)
- Incumbent
- Assumed office 1 January 2012
- Appointed by: Fernando Chui
- Preceded by: Chu Kin

Personal details
- Born: 1966 (age 58–59)

Song Man Lei (born 1966) is a judge from Macau. She is the first female judge to sit on Macau's highest appellate court, the Court of Final Appeal.

== Early life ==
Song Man Lei studied law, earning a law degree and a master's degree at Beijing University. She also attended language and law classes at the University of Coimbra and Macau University. She completed her judicial training at the Center for Training Macau Magistrates.

== Career ==
Song Man Lei worked as a senior local magistrate, later joining Macau's Public Prosecutor Office in 1996. In March 2000, she was appointed Deputy Prosecutor, and served in that role until 2011. She was Macau's first female delegate in the local prosecutor's office.

In 2012, she became the first woman to be appointed as a judge in Macau's highest court, the Court of Final Appeal. She replaced Judge Chu Kim, who died in a car accident in China in 2011.

Along with her duties as a judge, she participated in legal education, teaching at a Chinese judicial training institute (the National Judges College). During her time as a judge on the Court of Final Appeal, she notably prosecuted her former supervisor, prosecutor Ho Chio Meng, for multiple offenses including fraud, money laundering and criminal association, and sentenced him to 21 years in prison along with a significant fine. Song Man Lei had previously worked as an assistant general prosecutor while he headed the Public Prosecutor's Office. During sentencing, Song Man Lei described Ho Chio Meng's conduct as having "tarnished the reputation" of the prosecutor's office. She was also selected twice (in 2011 and 2019) to serve as the Chair of an election committee, whose function is to scrutinize the results of Macau's general election, and manage the electoral process.
