= Social Welfare Bureau =

Government department of Macau responsible for social welfare

- 社會工作局 (Chinese); Instituto de Acção Social (Portuguese)

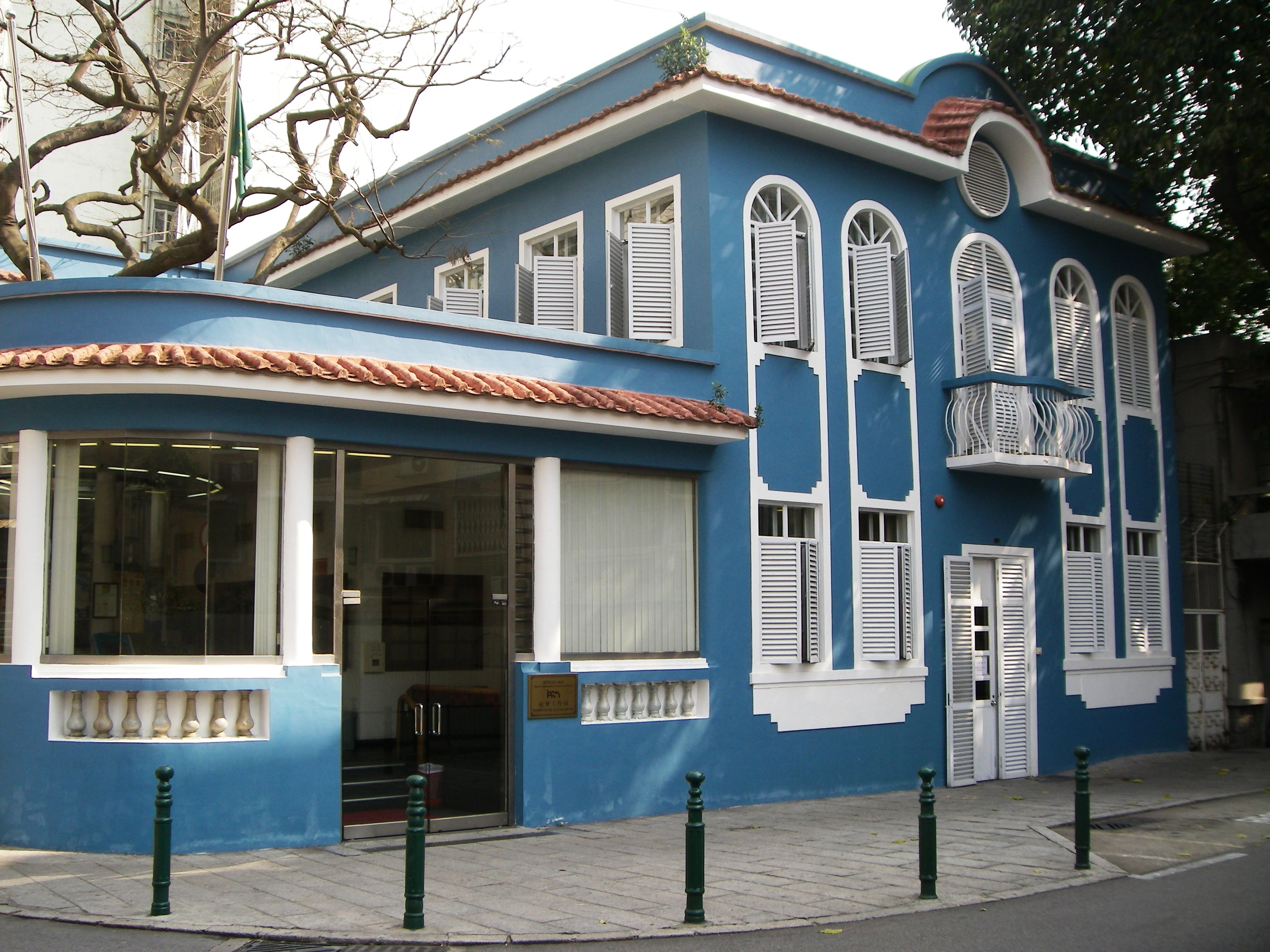
- The Blue House, the bureau's headquarters

Agency overview
- Formed: 1938
- Preceding agency: Macao Department for Social Welfare
- Jurisdiction: Macau
- Headquarters: Blue House (Casa Azul), No. 6 Estrada do Cemitério, Macau
- Agency executive: Wilson Hon Wai, Director (President)
- Parent agency: Secretariat for Social Affairs and Culture
- Website: www.ias.gov.mo

The Social Welfare Bureau (Chinese: 社會工作局; Portuguese: Instituto de Acção Social, abbreviated IAS) is the government agency of Macau responsible for social welfare and social work. Part of the Macao Special Administrative Region Government, it reports to the Secretariat for Social Affairs and Culture and is headed by a director (president), currently Wilson Hon Wai. The bureau plans, coordinates and implements Macau's social welfare policy and subsidises non-governmental organisations that deliver services alongside its own facilities.

The bureau traces its origins to 1938, when the colonial authorities established a public charity relief body. It became the Macao Department for Social Welfare on 1 January 1980 and adopted its present name with the transfer of sovereignty over Macau on 20 December 1999. It is headquartered at the Blue House (Portuguese: Casa Azul), a historic blue-painted building at No. 6 Estrada do Cemitério.

The bureau provides financial assistance and services for families, children and youth (including Macau's only authorised adoption service), elderly people, and people with disabilities; prevention and treatment of drug dependence and gambling disorder; and social reintegration for offenders. In 2017 it spent over MOP 2.415 billion on social welfare services delivered by about 250 subsidised agencies.

== History ==
The bureau traces its origins to the Public Charity Society (Chinese: 公共慈善救濟總會), created in 1938 to provide poor residents with relief in cash or in kind, fund charitable organisations, and supervise the care of orphans and abandoned babies. In 1960 it was reorganised as the Public Relief Branch (Chinese: 公共救濟處), which expanded into meal services, disaster relief and the construction of social service facilities. In 1967 the body was renamed the Social Relief Division (Chinese: 社會救濟處), the direct predecessor of the present bureau; in 2017 the bureau marked the 50th anniversary of that establishment.

Under Decree 27-C/79M of 1979, the Social Relief Division was reorganised on 1 January 1980 as the Macao Department for Social Welfare (Chinese: 社會工作司). A further reorganisation in the 1980s defined the principles of "equality, efficiency, mutual assistance and participation", and in the 1990s the department's direct services were separated into a Department of Family and Community Service and a Department of Social Solidarity.

With the transfer of sovereignty on 20 December 1999, the Macao Department for Social Welfare was renamed the Social Welfare Bureau, and the functions of prevention and treatment of drug dependence were added. On 1 January 2016 the bureau was reorganised under Administrative Regulation No. 28/2015, adding social reintegration functions and adopting a structure of one director, two deputy directors, six departments and 17 divisions.

== Organisation ==
The bureau is headed by a director (styled president), assisted by two deputy directors; as of 2026 the director is Wilson Hon Wai. Under Administrative Regulation No. 28/2015, it comprises six departments – administrative and financial; research and planning; family and community services; social solidarity; prevention and treatment of drug and gambling addictions; and social reintegration – which oversee 17 divisions.

== Services ==
The bureau both delivers services directly and funds non-governmental organisations. Its main areas of work are:

- Individual and family services: financial assistance (general, non-regular and special subsidies), personal and family counselling, disaster relief, and support for victims of domestic violence.
- Children and youth: the sole authorised adoption agency in Macau, foster care and residential homes, court auxiliary services for minors in judicial proceedings, and supervision of young offenders.
- Elderly services: elderly centres, residential and day care, the Senior Citizen's Card, and the Old-age Allowance, introduced in 2005 for permanent residents aged 65 or above.
- Rehabilitation services: multi-disciplinary disability assessment and the Disability Assessment Card, subsidies for rehabilitation services, and assistive-device services.
- Prevention and treatment of drug dependence: drug-abuse prevention education, the Drug Treatment Complex Centre, and methadone maintenance treatment centres.
- Prevention and treatment of gambling disorder: the Resilience Centre for problem gambling, a 24-hour hotline and online counselling, and responsible-gambling programmes.
- Social reintegration: correctional programmes, halfway homes and support for discharged offenders and juvenile offenders.

In 2017 the bureau spent over MOP 2.415 billion on services provided by 250 agencies and ran 13 social service facilities of its own.

== See also ==
- Social Welfare Department – the equivalent agency in Hong Kong
- Caritas Macau
