= Sam Hou Fai =

Chief Executive of Macau since 2024

- 岑浩輝
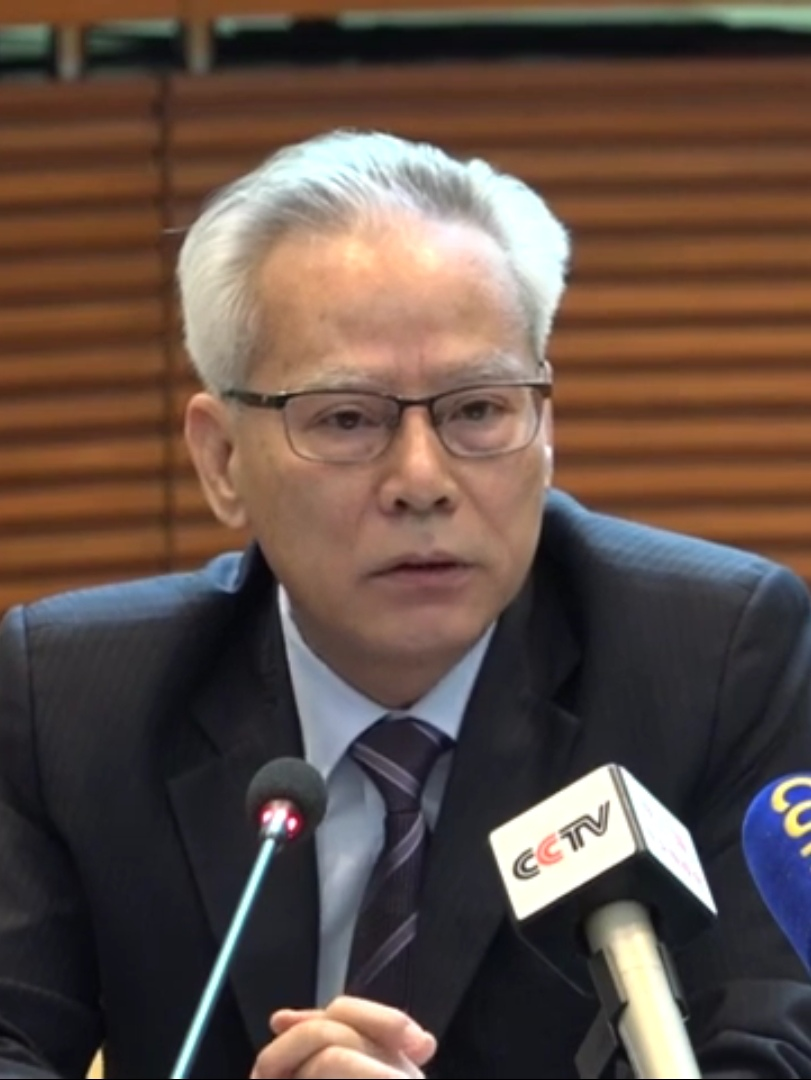
- Sam in 2019

4th Chief Executive of Macau
- Incumbent
- Assumed office December 20, 2024
- President: Xi Jinping
- Premier: Li Qiang
- Preceded by: Ho Iat Seng

President of the Court of Final Appeal of Macau
- In office December 20, 1999 – August 28, 2024
- Appointed by: Edmund Ho
- Succeeded by: Song Man Lei

Personal details
- Born: May 3, 1962 (age 64) Zhongshan, Guangdong, China
- Children: 2
- Education: Peking University (LLB); University of Coimbra
- Occupation: Judge

Sam Hou Fai
- Traditional Chinese: 岑浩輝
- Simplified Chinese: 岑浩辉
Transcriptions
Standard Mandarin
- Hanyu Pinyin: Cén Hàohuī
Yue: Cantonese
- Jyutping: sam4 hou6 fai1

Sam Hou Fai (Chinese: 岑浩輝, born May 1962) is a Macau politician and former judge who has served as the Chief Executive of Macau since December 2024. He was the first president of the Court of Final Appeal, serving from Macau's handover to China in 1999 until August 2024, when he stepped down to run in the 2024 Chief Executive election, in which he was the sole candidate. Born in Zhongshan, China, he is the first chief executive of Macau to have been born in mainland China, and the first without a business background.

== Early life and education ==
Sam was born in May 1962 into a rural family in Zhongshan, Guangdong. He graduated from the law department of Peking University in the mid-1980s, and he practised as a lawyer in mainland China. He moved to Macau in 1986. According to the veteran pro-democracy politician Au Kam San, Sam came to Macau as a cadre posted to the Macau branch of the Xinhua News Agency, the predecessor of Beijing's liaison office in the city, where he specialised in Macau law. In 1990, he went to Portugal to study Portuguese language, culture and law at the University of Coimbra, and he returned to Macau in 1993. He also took law courses at the University of Macau.

Political commentators have described Sam as one of a group of thirteen officials from mainland China whom Beijing groomed to govern Macau, sometimes called the "thirteen taibao".

== Judicial career ==
After returning from Portugal, Sam joined the first group of judicial trainees in Macau, and he took part in the territory's first training course for magistrates in 1994 and 1995. In 1995, he began working in both the courts and the Public Prosecutions Office. He became a judge in 1997, serving on the Court of General Jurisdiction, and he was later elected to Macau's Judiciary Committee.

On 20 December 1999, when sovereignty over Macau was transferred to China, Chief Executive Edmund Ho appointed Sam the first president of the Court of Final Appeal. He was 37 years old, and he was reported to be the youngest chief justice in the world. As president, he also chaired the Magistrate Council, and he served on the Independent Commission for the Recommendation of Judges and on the working committee on regional and international mutual legal assistance. He was also honorary president of the Association for the Promotion of the Macao Basic Law.

Sam presided over the corruption trials of the former Secretary for Transport and Public Works Ao Man Long and the former prosecutor-general Ho Chio Meng. In January 2008, the court sentenced Ao to 27 years in prison after convicting him on 57 of 76 counts of bribery, money laundering and abuse of power, and Sam described Ao as predatory and insatiably greedy. In a second case in April 2009, Ao was sentenced to a combined 28 years, and Sam said that "the number of crimes and the time span over his crimes are unprecedented". Under Sam's presidency, the court rejected an appeal against a police ban on a vigil commemorating the 1989 Tiananmen Square protests and massacre, and it upheld the disqualification of pro-democracy candidates from the 2021 Legislative Assembly election.

== 2024 Chief Executive election ==
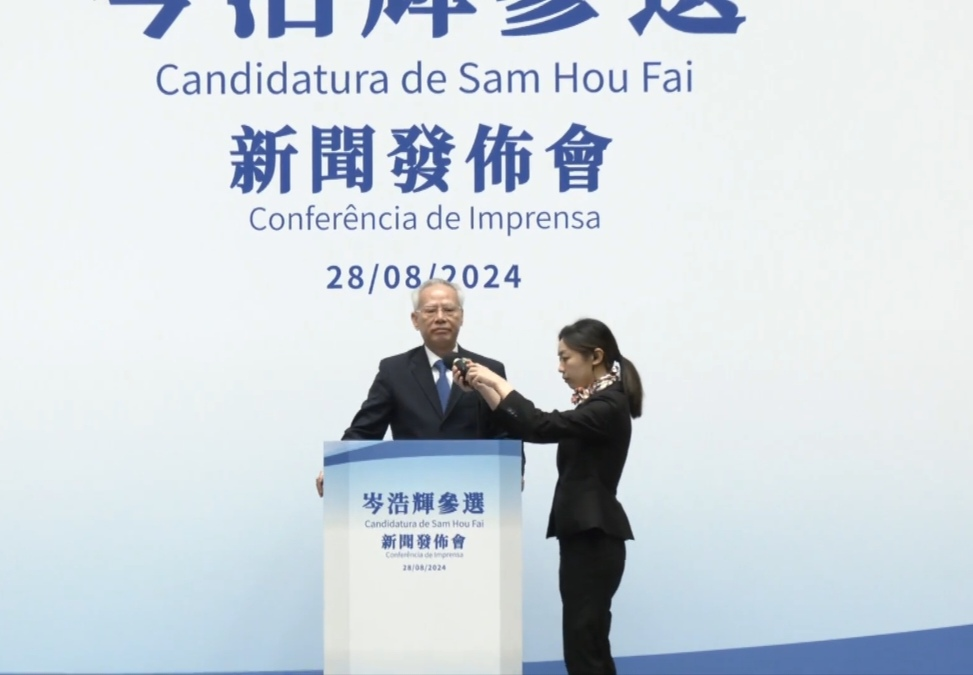
Sam declaring his candidacy, 28 August 2024

On 26 August 2024, Chief Executive Ho Iat Seng announced that Sam had resigned as president of the Court of Final Appeal, with effect from 28 August, ahead of the 2024 Chief Executive election. Sam formally announced his candidacy on 28 August. By the deadline of 12 September, he had secured 386 nominations from the 400-member Election Committee, or 96.5 per cent of its members, making him the only candidate. During the campaign, he met 108 community associations and gathered more than 2,200 opinions.

Sam warned against the dominant role of the casino industry in Macau's economy, saying that "for a period of time, the tourism and gaming industry developed in a disorderly manner and expanded wildly", and that having one industry dominate the city "is not beneficial for Macau's long-term development". He said the growth of casinos had strained resources such as the workforce and narrowed the career choices of young people, and he called for diversification away from the industry.

On 13 October 2024, Sam received 394 of the 398 votes cast, with the remaining four ballots left blank. He described his election as "the highest honour of my life". He promised to support the long-term development of local businesses, and said that integrating into national development "is the most important policy for Macau's future development". Radio Free Asia reported that many critics saw his selection as a sign that Macau was now effectively administered by Beijing, and Au Kam San said that Beijing believed Sam, who understood mainland China better, was less likely to do any harm. On 25 October 2024, the State Council appointed him chief executive.

== Chief Executive ==
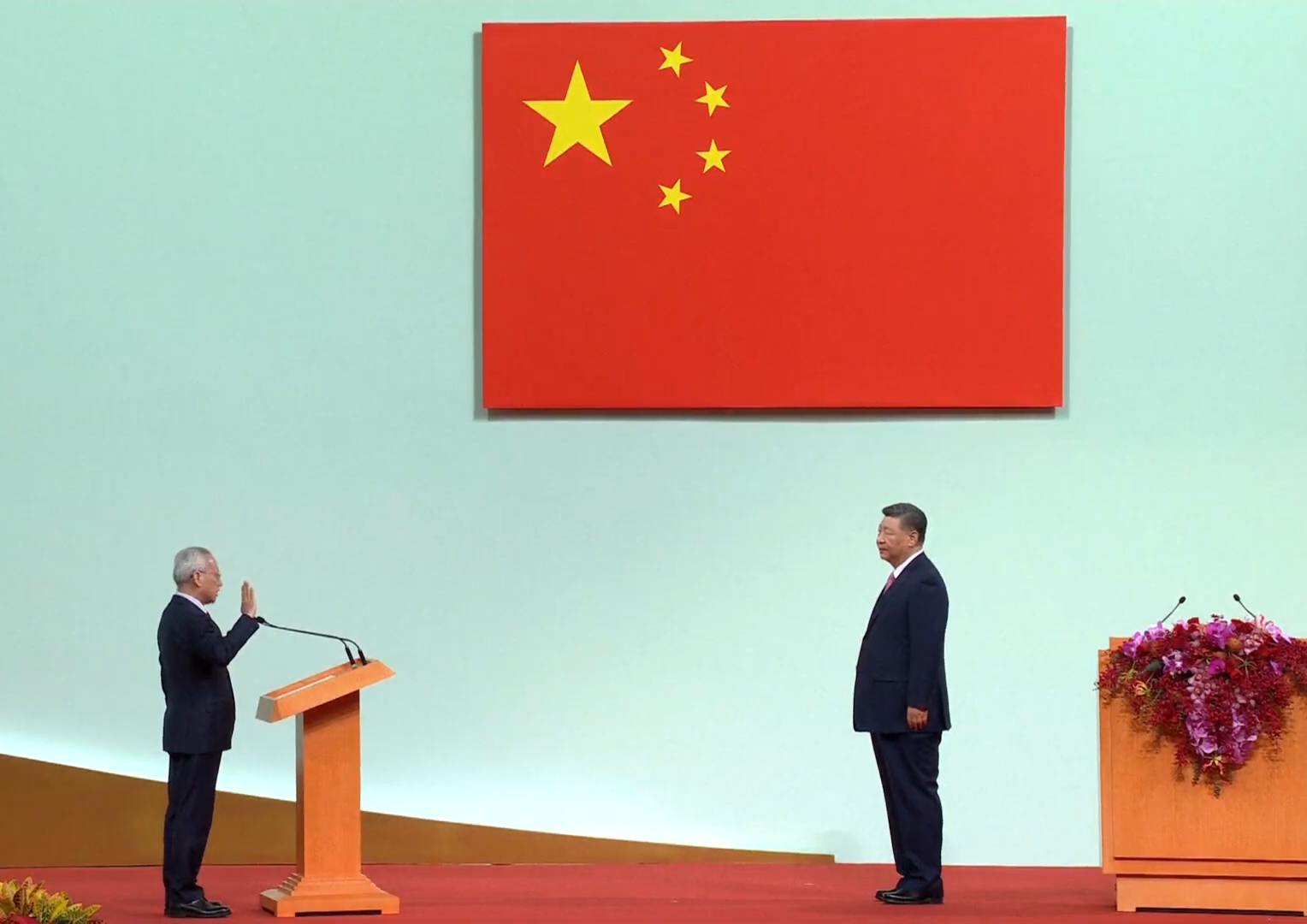
Sam sworn in as Chief Executive of Macau by Xi Jinping (2024)

In November 2024, the State Council appointed the principal officials of Sam's government, including André Cheong as Secretary for Administration and Justice, Tai Kin Ip as Secretary for Economy and Finance, Wong Sio Chak as Secretary for Security, O Lam as Secretary for Social Affairs and Culture, and Raymond Tam as Secretary for Transport and Public Works. Xi Jinping swore Sam in on 20 December 2024, the 25th anniversary of the handover, at the end of a three-day visit to Macau. Sam vowed to address the territory's unbalanced and uncoordinated economic development, and said that his government would be clean, practical and close to the people.

On 14 April 2025, Sam delivered his first policy address, which centred on enhancing economic diversification, improving livelihoods, strengthening governance and integrating into national development, including through the Guangdong–Macao In-Depth Cooperation Zone in Hengqin. In July 2025, the electoral commission disqualified 12 candidates from the Legislative Assembly election, including the sitting lawmaker Ron Lam, on the basis of an opinion from the Committee for Safeguarding National Security, which found that they had failed to uphold the Basic Law or to pledge allegiance to the Macau Special Administrative Region. Sam chairs the committee ex officio. In late July 2025, Au Kam San, a Portuguese citizen, was detained in the first case under Macau's national security law.

In November 2025, Sam delivered his policy address for 2026, which kept the annual cash handout of 10,000 patacas for permanent residents and 6,000 patacas for non-permanent residents, and announced the merger of several government departments and plans for anti-terrorism and anti-money-laundering legislation. He said that "the ultimate goal of governance is to ensure that residents can live a better life". On 16 December 2025, during Sam's annual duty visit to Beijing, Xi said that the central authorities fully recognised the work of Sam and his government. In December 2025, Sam also said that his government had systematically carried out the tasks required under the national security framework, had applied the principle of patriots governing Macau in the legislative election, and had detained a former legislator for endangering national security. He said that all of Macau's 13 satellite casinos would close by 31 December, in accordance with the law.

On 16 April 2026, the central government removed Tai Kin Ip as Secretary for Economy and Finance on Sam's proposal, after Tai resigned for personal reasons, and Sam exercised the post's powers himself until a successor was appointed. On 15 June 2026, Sam swore in Ng Wai Han, the director of the Gaming Inspection and Coordination Bureau, as the new secretary.

In April 2026, Sam made his first overseas trip as chief executive, visiting Lisbon, Madrid, Geneva and Brussels. In Lisbon on 21 April, he met Prime Minister Luís Montenegro for talks on strengthening economic cooperation and relations between Portugal, China and Macau, and he also met President António José Seguro. He said that government and business delegations had signed 61 cooperation agreements in Portugal.

== Personal life ==
Sam settled and started a family in Macau after moving there in the 1980s, and he has said that his children and grandchildren were born and raised in the city.

Political offices
Preceded by Ho Iat Seng	Chief Executive of Macau; 2024–present	Incumbent
Legal offices
New title	President of the Court of Final Appeal of Macau; 1999-2024	Succeeded by Song Man Lei
New title	President of the Conselho dos Magistrados Judiciais; 1999-2024	Succeeded by Song Man Lei
