= Commercial code (law) =

Code

In law, a commercial code is a codification of private law relating to business merchants, trade, business entities (especially companies and brands), commercial contracts and other matters such as negotiable instruments.

Many civil law legal systems have codifications of commercial law.

== See also ==
- Civil code
- Civil law (legal system)
- Commercial law
