= Secretary for Economic Coordination =

Macanese government official

The Secretary for Economic Coordination (Portuguese: Secretariado para a Coordenação Económica) was the bureau secretary and finance minister in Portuguese Macau. The Secretary headed the Secretariat for Economic Coordination, which was responsible for financial affairs in the colony. The department was replaced by the Secretariat for Economy and Finance.

== Organisational structure ==
- Macau Economic Service
- Finance Services Bureau
- Statistics and Census Bureau
- Labour Affairs Bureau
- Social Security Fund
- Gaming Inspection and Coordination Bureau
- Pension Fund
- Consumer Council
- Macau Trade and Investment Promotion Institute
- Macau Monetary Authority
- Human Resources Office

== List of Secretariats ==
- Vítor Rodrigues Pessoa
