= 2024 Macanese Chief Executive election =

- 13 October 2024

All 400 votes of the Election Committee 201 votes needed to win
- Turnout: 99.50%
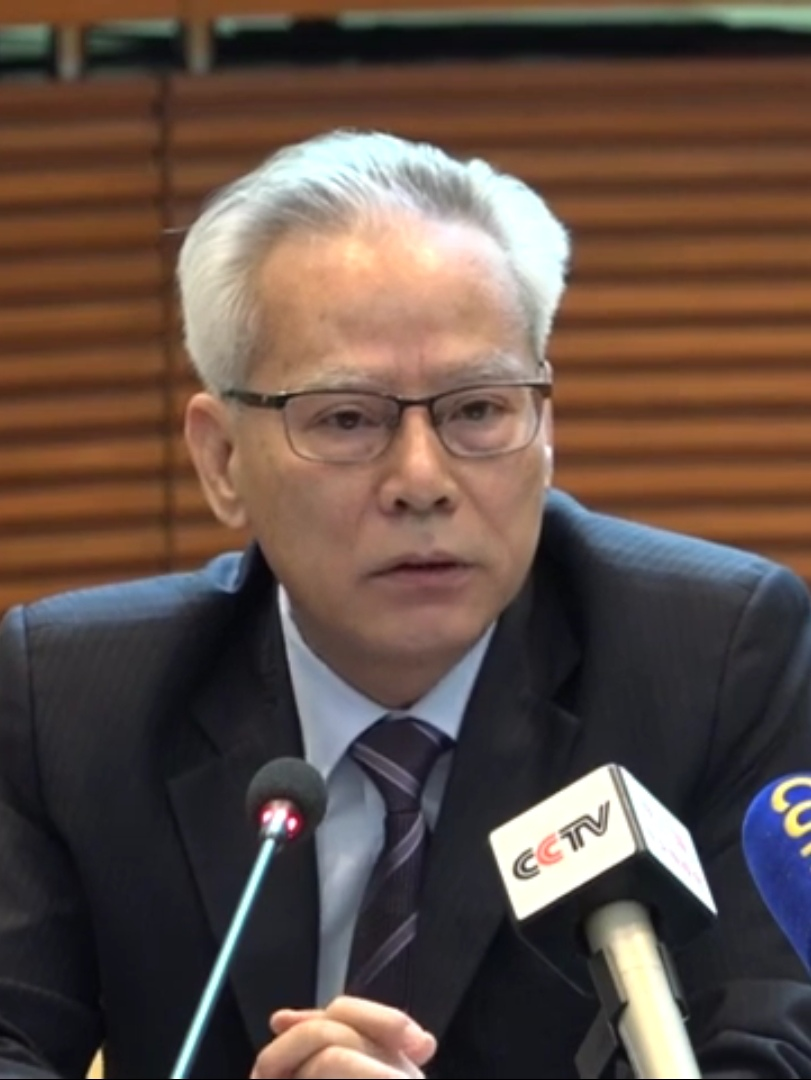
Candidate	Sam Hou Fai
Party	Independent
Alliance	Pro-Beijing
Electoral vote	394
Percentage	98.99%
Chief Executive before election
Ho Iat-seng
Independent
Elected Chief Executive
Sam Hou Fai
Independent

The 2024 Macanese Chief Executive election was held on 13 October 2024 for the 6th term of the Chief Executive of Macau (CE), the highest office of the Macau Special Administrative Region. Incumbent Ho Iat Seng, who was elected in 2019, declined to seek a second term for health reasons and finished his term on 20 December 2024. Former President of the Court of Final Appeal Sam Hou Fai was the sole candidate to be nominated. He received 394 electoral votes (98.50%) and assumed office on 20 December 2024.

== Background ==
=== Electoral change ===
Authorities in Macau followed those in Hong Kong and pushed for "patriots-only" electoral changes. In June 2023, the Macanese government announced public consultation on amending the election laws, including the proposed "perfection" on vetting mechanism.

Under the proposed new rules, candidates in Chief Executive or legislative elections would need to be approved by the national security commission. Candidates, along with members of the Election Committee and Election Commission, are required to uphold the Basic Law and pledge allegiance to the Macanese Government. Decisions by the commission cannot be challenged in court, and those deemed "unpatriotic" would be barred from running in elections for five years. Inciting others, regardless in Macau or abroad, not to vote in the elections, or to cast invalid ballots or to abstain, would be criminalised as well.

According to the government, the 45-day consultation saw "overwhelming" support across the society, believing such reform is "necessary" and "timely" in order to implement "patriots-only" principle endorsed by General Secretary of the Chinese Communist Party Xi Jinping. The amendments were adopted by the Legislative Assembly in December 2023 and came into effect on 1 January 2024.

=== Ho's health ===
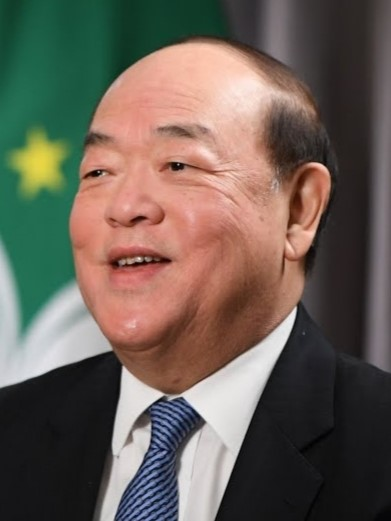
Ho in 2021

Ho Iat-seng was eligible for a second term after first being elected in 2019. When asked in May 2023 whether he would seek re-election, Ho said he did not give any consideration as his current term of office would end one and a half year later. He then said in November no formal decisions were made and thus no comments when he was asked again of his intention after he presented the last policy address of this current term.

In May 2024 following the trip of Xia Baolong, the CCP Hong Kong and Macao Work Office director, Ho said the Chinese Government did not talk to him about another term, and remained non-committal on re-election.

Several weeks later, Ho would be in long absence following his last public appearance on 20 June 2024. His office announced on the next day that Ho took a 13-day leave, which was subsequently extended for another 16 days and until 19 July, and another 10 days until 29 July. His 39-days long holiday just months before the election sparked question and rumour of his health. The government insisted Ho was in "good condition" and had "undergone routine medical check-ups and received related medical treatment". During his absence he issued statements to thank the Chinese Government for two new policy initiatives. Ho eventually reappeared in public eyes on 1 August to attend Macao Garrison's event.

Macau News Agency reported in early July, citing unnamed sources, that Ho was resting outside Macau during the leave, and was planning to formally announce his candidacy for a second term after the members of the Election Committee are selected on 11 August.

=== Election Committee election ===
An indirect poll to select 400 Election Committee members, whose duty is to elect the new Chief Executive, was held on 11 August 2024. 348 people put forward their names, and their candidacies were all approved by the authorities. Only two constituencies, Education and Labour, had to organise elections as the number of candidates exceeded that of the seats by two each, while other candidates were selected unopposed.

== Pre-nomination events ==
Although prior media reports suggested Ho will be running for a second term, in a statement on 21 August Ho said he decided not to seek re-election, citing health reasons, making him the first leader since the handover to China in 1999 not to complete two five-year terms of office.

But due to the fact that my health has not been fully restored, for the sake of Macau’s long-term development and from the perspective of the overall situation, I have decided not to participate in the election for the sixth-term Chief Executive.

He added he has "profound feelings for Macau and have done my utmost for Macau’s development", and thanked the Chinese government and all sectors of Macau "for their full trust and steadfast support".

A day later, Sam Hou-fai, President of the Court of Final Appeal, said he was considering running for Chief Executive, describing the top post as "a noble one" and that he always "hold a strong desire to serve Macau". Macanese journal Plataforma, quoting unnamed sources, reported Sam was likely the sole candidate in the race, and Jorge Chiang, president of Chamber of Commerce, was unlikely to secure the required 66 nominations.

Sources reported by Platforma and other media also named Administration and Justice Secretary Cheong Weng-chon and Security Secretary Wong Sio-chak as potential candidates, who had both declined to comment on running for the top job before the election process began. There was also another unnamed person "outside the Administration" considered as a potential figure according to Platforma, although these three individuals were apparently blocked for the top job by Beijing and such decision could have been conveyed during the visit of Shi Taifeng, Head of the United Front Work Department, to Macau on 17 and 18 August. Liu Chak-wan, Chancellor of Macau University of Science and Technology and a member of the Executive Council, along with businessman Sio Chi-wai, a Macau deputy of National People's Congress, were also singled out by media as possible successor.

Analysts noted all three top likely contenders, Sam, Cheong, and Wong, were born in China, unlike Ho and his two predecessors, and completed their university education in Beijing, raising concerns over next Chief Executive's familiarity with Macau and their commitment to the current governing style.

Sam resigned from the Court of Final Appeal on 26 August according to an executive order by Ho Iat-sing, effective from 28 August, when he announced his leadership bid. The nomination period began on 29 August.

== Nomination ==
The nomination period commenced on 29 August and candidates were required to obtain at least 66 nominations among the Election Committee before 12 September in order to be eligible for the election.

On 10 September, Sam obtained 383 out of 400 nominations of the Election Committee. Since each Election Committee member could only nominate one candidate, Sam became the sole eligible candidate for this election. Sam received 3 more nominations before the deadline on 12 September, i.e. 386 nominations in total, accounting for 96.5% of its members. The Macau Electoral Affairs Commission confirmed Sam's eligibility on 18 September.

== Candidates ==
=== Nominee ===
- Sam Hou Fai, President of the Court of Final Appeal of Macau who has resigned

=== Failed to be nominated ===
None of the following candidates were successfully nominated.

- Jorge Chiang, president of the Macau Lotus Chamber of Commerce and the Macau Society of Institutional Studies

=== Declined to run ===
The following persons explicitly declined to run:

- Ho Iat Seng, incumbent Chief Executive of Macau
- Cheong Weng Chon, Secretary for Administration and Justice of Macau
- Wong Sio Chak, Secretary for Security of Macau

The following persons were considered potential candidates but made no comment:

- Liu Chak Wan, Chancellor of the Macau University of Science and Technology

== Results ==
Candidate	Party	Votes	%
Sam Hou-fai	Independent	394	100.00
Total		394	100.00
Valid votes		394	98.99
Invalid/blank votes		4	1.01
Total votes		398	100.00
Registered voters/turnout		400	99.50
