= Court of Final Appeal of Macau =

Top court in Macau

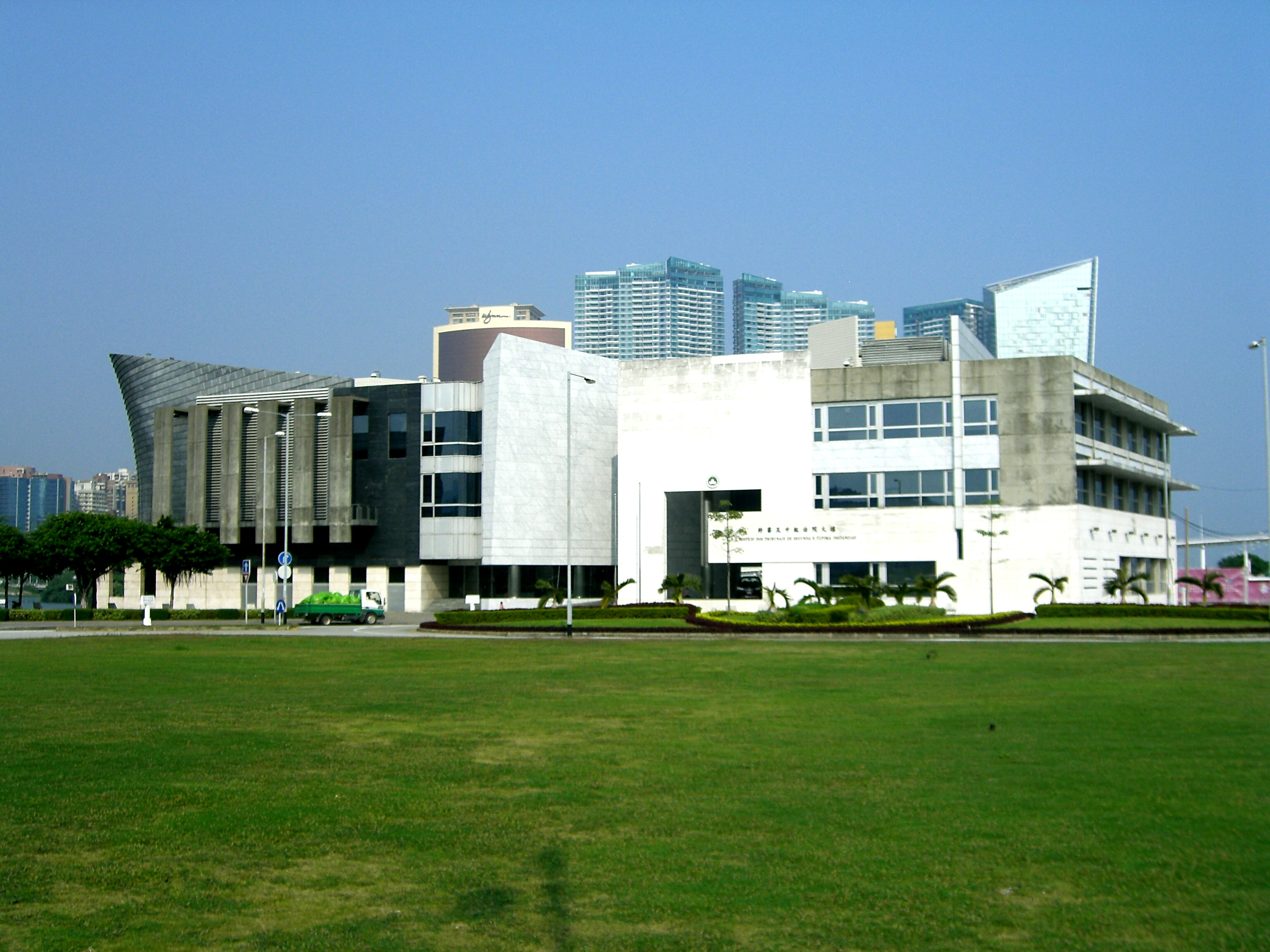
- The Court of Final Appeal building

Chinese name
- Traditional Chinese: 澳門終審法院
- Simplified Chinese: 澳门终审法院
Transcriptions
Standard Mandarin
- Hanyu Pinyin: Àomén Zhōngshěnfǎyuàn
- Wade–Giles: Ao^{4}-mên^{2} Chung^{1}-shên^{3}-fa^{3}-yüan^{4}
Yue: Cantonese
- Jyutping: ou3 mun4*2 zung1 sam2 faat3 jyun6*2

Portuguese name
- Portuguese: Tribunal de Última Instância de Macau

The Court of Final Appeal of Macau (Portuguese: Tribunal de Última Instância de Macau; Chinese: 澳門終審法院) is the court with the final adjudication power on laws of Macau. Prior to 1999, the highest court was the Higher Court of Justice of Macau and prior to that the Court of Appeal of the Judiciary District of Lisbon in Portugal.

Under the Basic Law of Macau, which is the constitutional document of the region, Macau remains an independent legal jurisdiction. On the other hand, the power of interpretation of the Basic Law itself, being part of the national law, is vested in the Standing Committee of the National People's Congress of China (NPCSC) in accordance with the Basic Law. However, the same Article delegates such power to the courts of Macau for interpretation while handling court cases.

== Judges ==
As of December 2024, the judges of the court include the following:

- Song Man Lei (President)
- José Maria Dias Azedo

Sam Hou Fai, who has been serving as the President of the Court of Final Appeal of Macau since its establishment, has resigned to run for Chief Executive since August 2024, leaving the position vacant. Song Man Lei was appointed president on 2 December 2024.

== See also ==
- Legal system of Macau
