= Francis Tam =

Macau politician

Francis Tam Tam Pak Yuen
- 譚伯源
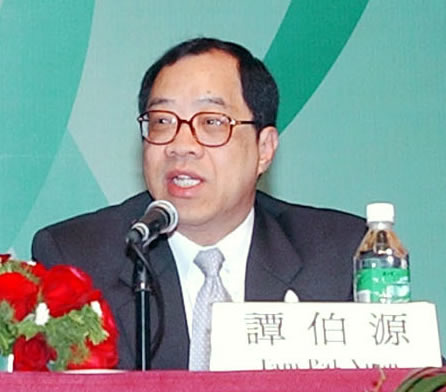

Secretary of Economy and Finance of Macau
- In office 20 December 1999 – 20 December 2014
- Preceded by: Vítor Rodrigues Pessoa as Secretary for Economic Coordination of Macau
- Succeeded by: Lionel Leong Vai Tac

Personal details
- Born: May 1949 (age 77) Portuguese Macau
- Education: University of East Asia; University of Hong Kong; University of London
- Occupation: civil servant
- Profession: businessman

Francis Tam Pak Yuen (Chinese: 譚伯源) (born May 1949) is a former Secretary for Economy and Finance of Macau from 1999 to 2014.

== Education ==
Born in Macau, Tam obtained a British Senior diploma in business management, a diploma in Law of China, and a bachelor's degree in business administration from the University of East Asia.

== Business career ==
Prior to his current position, Tam was in the business of textiles with positions such as general manager of the Lun Hap Garment Factory and deputy director of the Macao Association of Manufacturers. He has held positions with various trade and business related entities including the board of directors of Macao's Chinese Chamber of Commerce and executive member of the All-China Federation of Industry and Commerce.

== Pro-China causes and Chinese political memberships ==
- Member of the Guangdong Provincial People's Political Consultative Conference
- Council member of the China Overseas Friendship Association
- Council Member of China Association for Promotion of Glorious Cause
- Member of the 9th National Committee of the Chinese People's Consultative Conference
- Member of the Preparatory Committee of the MSAR
- Member of the Selection Committee of the MSAR

Preceded by Vítor Rodrigues Pessoa as Secretary for Economic Coordination of Macau	Secretary for Economy and Finance of Macau; 1999-2014	Succeeded by Lionel Leong Vai Tac
