= Secretary for Economy and Finance =

Department of the Macau Government

The Secretary for Economy and Finance (Chinese: 經濟財政司; Portuguese: Secretariado para a Economia e Finanças) is a department of the Macau Government. The Secretariat is responsible for economic, financial and labour affairs in Macau and the region's economic co-operations with mainland China.

Prior to 1999, the department was known as Secretariat for Economic Coordination.

== Organisational structure ==
The SEF is structured as of 2022:

- Macau Economic Service
- Finance Services Bureau
- Statistics and Census Bureau
- Labour Affairs Bureau
- Social Security Fund
- Gaming Inspection and Coordination Bureau
- Pension Fund
- Consumer Council
- Macau Trade and Investment Promotion Institute
- Macau Monetary Authority
- Human Resources Office
- Financial Intelligence Office (Independent, but known to be under SEF oversight)

== List of Secretariats ==
No.	Image	Name	Assumed office	Left office	Term
1		Francis Tam Pak Yuen 譚伯源	20 December 1999	20 December 2004	1
1		Francis Tam Pak Yuen 譚伯源	20 December 2004	20 December 2009	2
1		Francis Tam Pak Yuen 譚伯源	20 December 2009	20 December 2014	3
2		Lionel Leong Vai Tac 梁維特	20 December 2014	20 December 2019	4
3		Lei Wai Nong 李偉農	20 December 2019	20 December 2024	5
4		Anton Tai Kin Ip 戴建業	20 December 2024	16 April 2026	6
During this interval, Chief Executive Sam Hou Fai was the Interim; Secretary for Economy and Finance. (16 April 2026 - 15 June 2026)					6
5		Ng Wai Han 吳惠嫻	15 June 2026	Incumbent; Term ends on 20 December 2029	6

== Directors ==
- Lau Ioc Ip - Economic Services
- Anselmo L.S. Teng - Chairman of the Monetary Authority of Macau
- Lee Peng Hong - President of the Macau Trade and Investment Promotion Institute

== Chief of Office ==
- Lok Kit Sim

Preceded by TBD	Secretariat for Economy and Finance (Macau); 1999-present	Succeeded by incumbent
