= List of companies of Macau =

Location of Macau

Macau is an autonomous territory on the western side of the Pearl River Delta in East Asia. With a population of 650,900 living in an area of 30.5 km^{2} (11.8 sq mi), it is the most densely populated region in the world.

Macau is among the world's richest regions, and as of 2015 its GDP per capita by purchasing power parity is higher than that of any country in the world, according to the World Bank. It became the world's largest gambling centre in 2006, with the economy heavily dependent on gambling and tourism, as well as manufacturing. According to The World Factbook, Macau has the fourth highest life expectancy in the world. Moreover, it is one of the regions in Asia with a "very high Human Development Index", ranking 18th in the world as of 2014.

== Notable firms ==
This list includes notable companies with primary headquarters located in the country. The industry and sector follow the Industry Classification Benchmark taxonomy. Organizations which have ceased operations are included and noted as defunct.

Notable companies Status: P=Private, S=State; A=Active, D=Defunct
Name	Industry	Sector	Headquarters	Founded	Notes	Status	
Air Macau	Consumer services	Airlines	Macau	1994	Airline	P	A
CEM	Utilities	Conventional electricity	Macau	1972	Power	P	A
China Construction Bank (Macau)	Financials	Banks	Macau	1972	Bank, part of China Construction Bank (Hong Kong)	P	A
Delta Asia Financial Group	Financials	Banks	Macau	1935	Bank	P	A
Industrial and Commercial Bank of China (Macau)	Financials	Banks	Macau	2009	Bank	P	A
Jet Asia	Consumer services	Airlines	Macau	1995	Airline	P	A
Macau Chinese Bank	Financials	Banks	Macau	2002	Bank	P	A
Macau Jockey Club	Consumer services	Gambling	Macau	1980	Horse racing	P	A
Macau.com	Consumer services	Travel & tourism	Macau	2006	Travel marketing	P	A
Manner	Consumer services	Entertainment	Macau	2013	Film production	P	A
Metis TransPacific Airlines	Consumer services	Airlines	Macau	2007	Defunct airline	P	D
OCBC Wing Hang Bank	Financials	Banks	Macau	1937	Bank, part of OCBC Bank (Singapore)	P	A
O'Che 1867	Consumer services	Specialty retailers	Macau	1867	Jewelry	P	A
Sands Macao	Consumer services	Gambling	Macau	2004	Casino	P	A
Shun Tak Holdings	Financials	Banks	Macau	1972	Bank	P	A
Sky Shuttle	Consumer services	Airlines	Macau	1997	Airline	P	A
Sociedade de Turismo e Diversões de Macau	Consumer services	Gambling	Macau	1962	Gambling	P	A
Transmac	Consumer services	Travel & tourism	Macau	1988	Bus service	P	A
Transportas Companhia de Macau	Consumer services	Travel & tourism	Macau	1950	Bus service	P	A
Viva Macau	Consumer services	Airlines	Macau	2005	Airline, defunct 2010	P	D
ZOTAC	Technology	Computer hardware	Macau	2006	Computer hardware	P	A

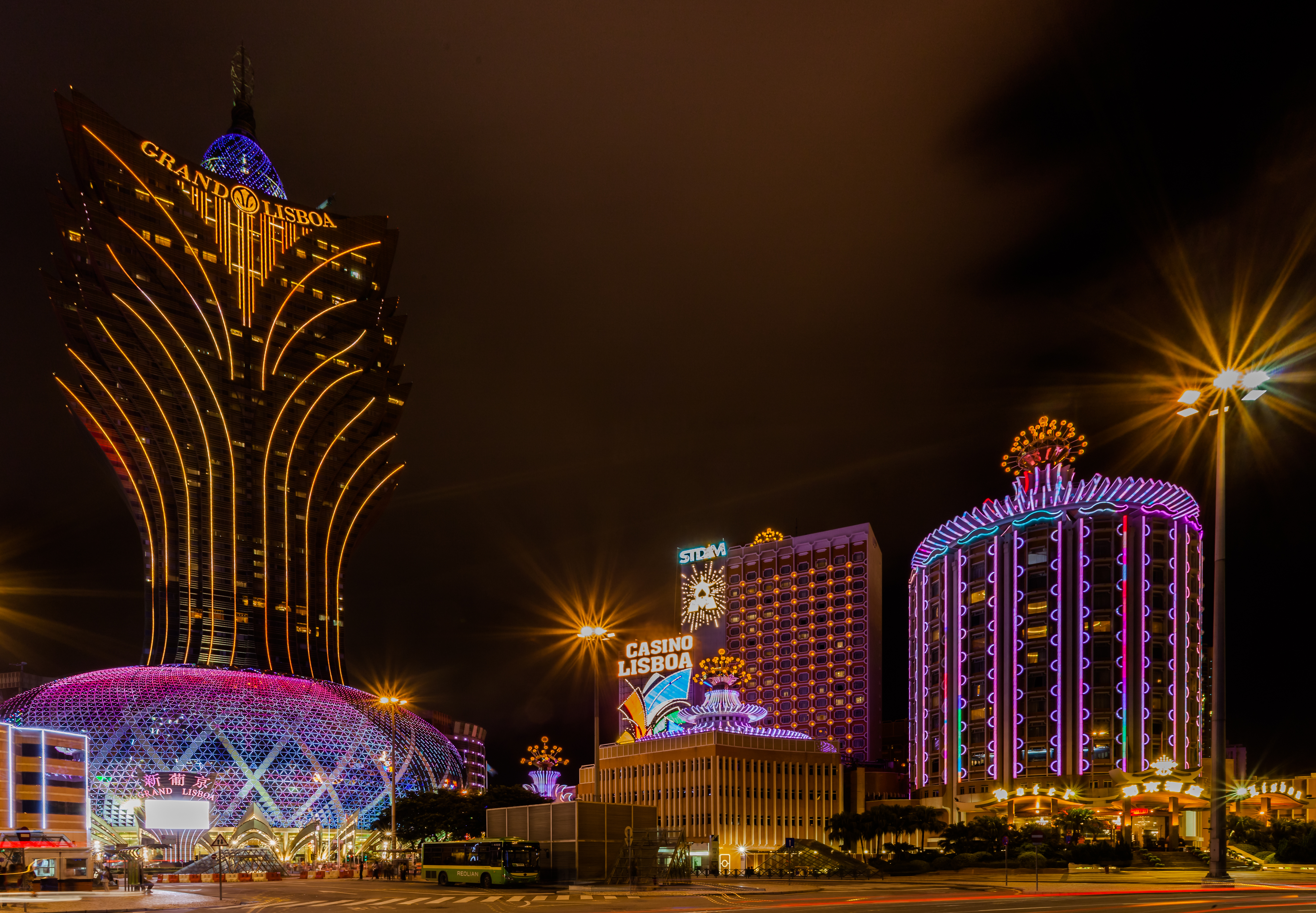
Grand Lisboa and Casino Lisboa

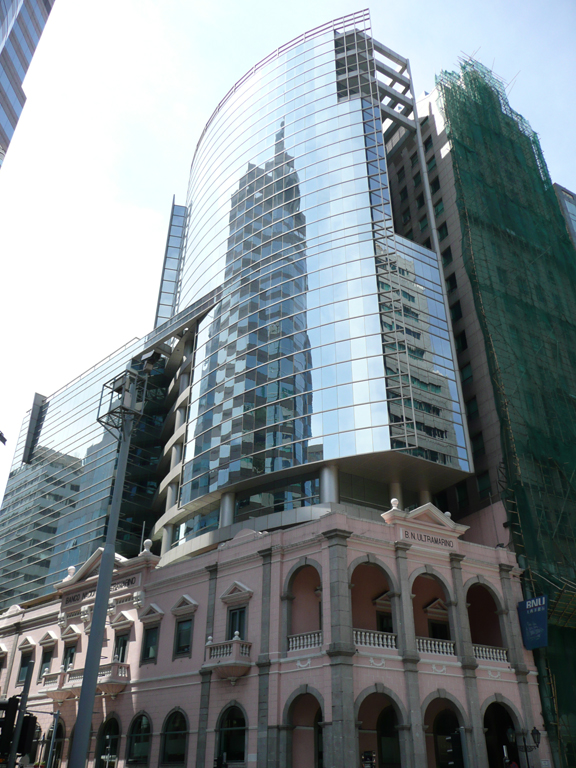
BNU tower

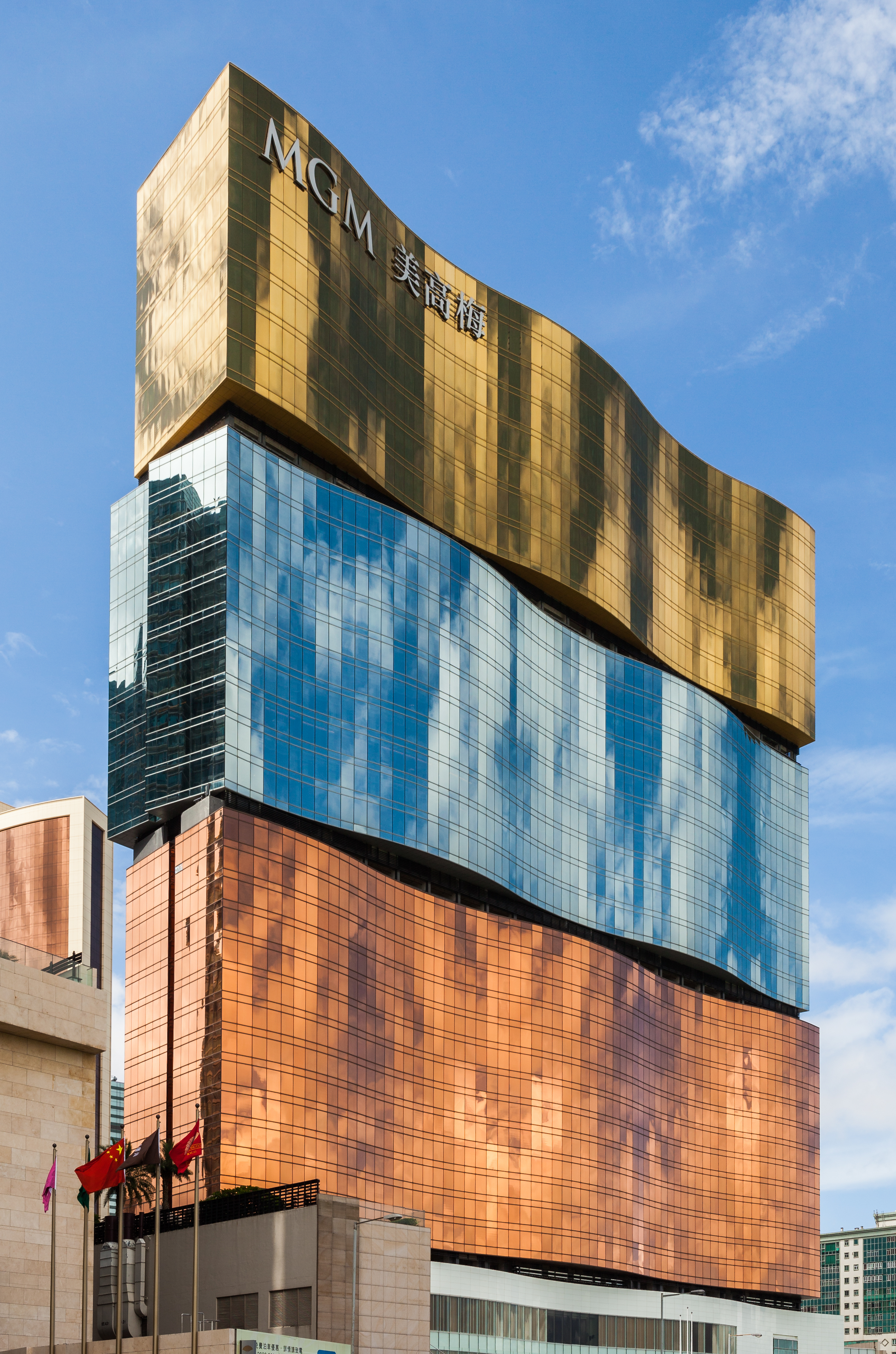
Casino Resort MGM Macau

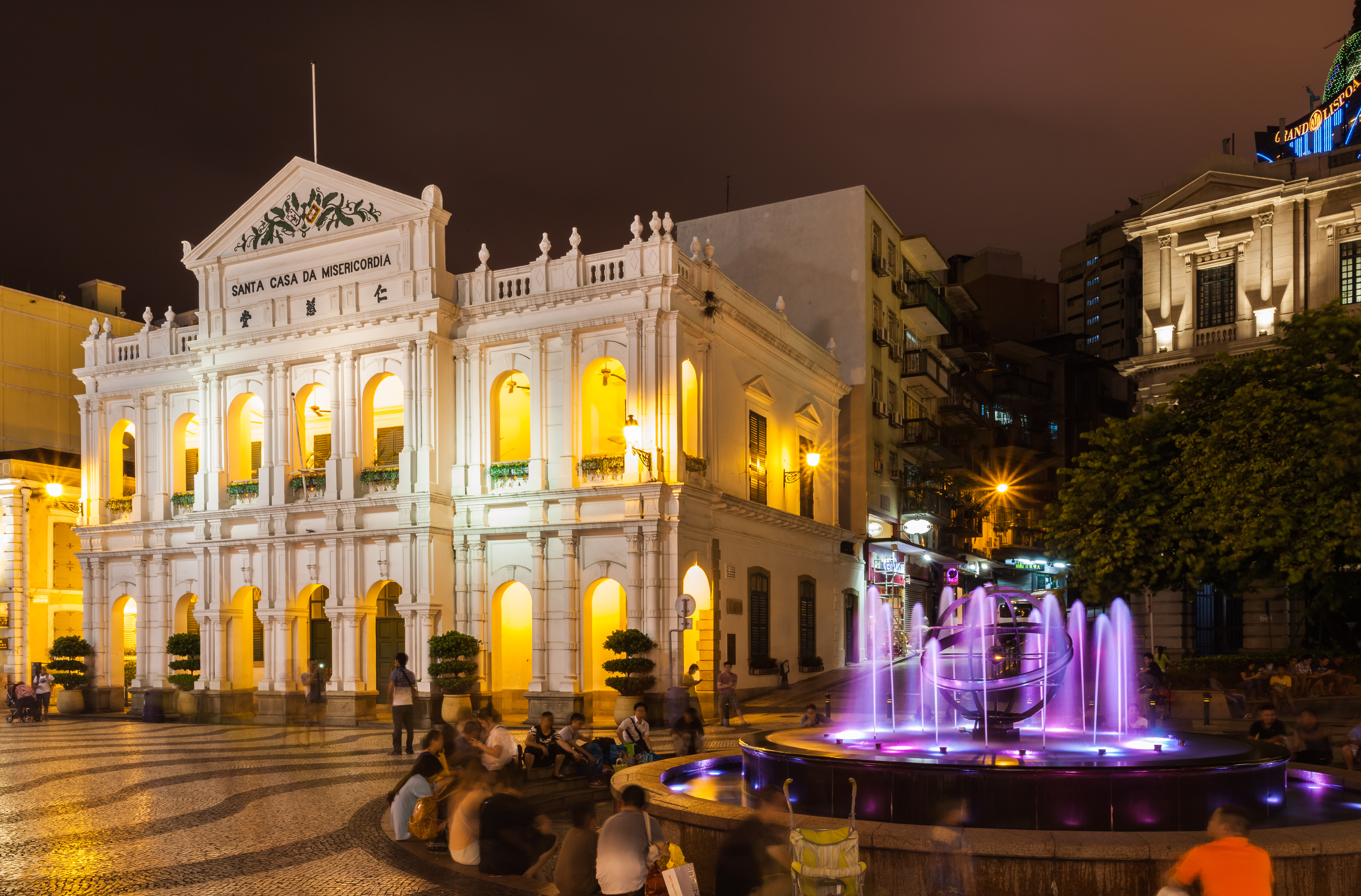
Senado Square, Macau

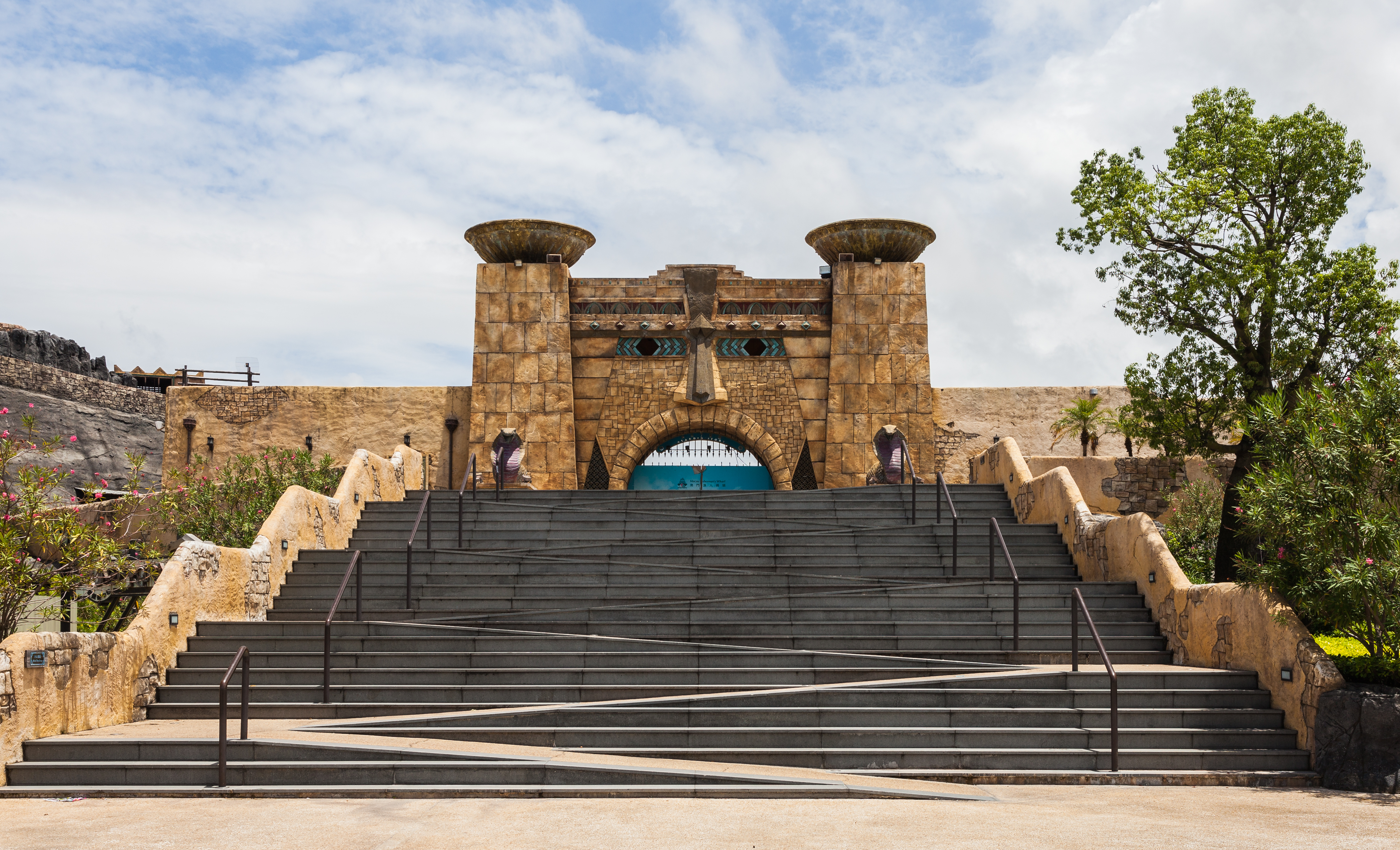
Fisherman's Wharf

== See also ==
- Economy of Macau
- List of banks in Macau
