= Mass media in Macau =

Mass media in Macau is available to the public in the forms of: television and radio, newspapers, magazines and the Internet. They serve the local community by providing necessary information and entertainment. Macau's media market is rather small. The local media face strong competition from Hong Kong.

Macau reportedly has the highest "media density" in the world – nine Chinese-language dailies, three Portuguese-language dailies, three English-language dailies and half a dozen Chinese-language weeklies and one Portuguese-language weekly. About three dozen newspapers from Hong Kong, mainland China, Taiwan and the Philippines are shipped to Macau every early morning.

== Print media ==
There are nine Chinese daily newspapers, three Portuguese dailies and two English daily newspapers in Macau. There are also six Chinese weekly newspapers and two Portuguese weekly newspapers.

All local newspapers that have been published for at least five years are entitled to subsidies from the government.

The first newspaper published in Macau was A Abelha da China (Chinese: 蜜蜂華報), which was only published for one year from 1822 to 1823.

- Hoje Macau – Portuguese-language daily
- Jornal Tribuna de Macau – Portuguese-language daily
- Macau Daily News – top circulation daily, Chinese-language
- Macau Daily Times – English language, owned by a non-media business interests
- Macau Post Daily – Macau's oldest English-language daily, owned by media interests
- O Clarim – Portuguese-English-Chinese language weekly, owned by the Catholic Church, oldest continuous Portuguese Newspaper in Macau (GCS. registration no.1)
- Ponto Final – Portuguese-language daily
- Tai Chung Pou – owned by a group of businessmen
- Va Kio Daily – privately owned Chinese daily
- Macau Lifestyle Media – English-language website
- The Sports Journal – Chinese sports news weekly
- MacauNews – English- and Chinese-language website
- Macau Platform – Portuguese- and Chinese-language weekly

Revista Macau is a quarterly magazine with cultural contents and run by the government. Macau Business is Macau's oldest English language publication, launched in May 2004, published monthly by a private company (De Ficção – Multimedia Projects) that also owns Business Intelligence Magazine a business magazine in Chinese, and Essential Macau a bilingual (Chinese/English) luxury magazine, "Macau News Agency", the first independent news agency available online and "MB.tv", and online video news platform; Inside Asian Gaming is a monthly gaming magazine, in English. World Gaming is an English and Chinese language magazine promoting the gaming and tourism sector.

== Broadcast media ==
TDM (Macau) – Teledifusão de Macau, S. A., provides public broadcasting service to Macau. By running five digital terrestrial TV channels, one satellite TV channel, two radio channels, TDM serves the audiences a wide range of contents in Macau's two official languages, Chinese and Portuguese.

Premium channels include:

- China Satellite Television (CSTV) 中華衛視
- Confucius Television (KZTV) 孔子衛視
- Fung Fu Television (FFTV) 功夫衛視
- Lotus TV Macau (LOTUS) 澳門蓮花衞視
- Macau Asia Satellite Television (MASTV) 澳亞衛視
- NewSky Satellite Television (NewSky) 新天衛視
- Teledifusão de Macau (TDM) 澳門廣播電視股份有限公司

== Media administration ==
The government of Macau established the Government Information Bureau to regulate media broadcasting and provides support organizations related to this aspect. They are directly responsible to the chief executive of Macau. Freedom of the press is guaranteed under the Basic Law and Press Law of Macau.

The death of Lai Minhua, director general of the Macao Customs Service, and its subsequent reporting has been used as a case study on media use in Macau and in particular how mainstream media was reluctant to report on her death.

== Reporters' organizations ==
There are five journalists' organizations in Macau.

== Media education ==
The University of Macau offer degree courses in media studies.

The University of Saint Joseph offers a Communication and Media program that covers a wide range of media disciplines.

== Internet ==
There are several major internet communities in Macau such as Macaustreet, CyberCTM, Qoos and Macauplus.

== See also ==
- Communications in Macau
- List of radio stations in Macau
- Media of Hong Kong
- Communications in Hong Kong
