= Manner Culture =

Macau entertainment company

Manner Culture Ltd.
- 微辣 Manner logo
- Native name: Chinese: 微辣文化有限公司; Portuguese: Manner Cultura Lda.
- Type: Private company
- Industry: Film production
- Founded: June 2013; 13 years ago
- Headquarters: Macau
- Products: Internet video Snacks

YouTube information
- Channel: 微辣 Manner
- Years active: 2013–present
- Subscribers: 624 thousand
- Views: 703 million
- Last updated: 1 January 2026

Chinese name
- Traditional Chinese: 微辣
- Simplified Chinese: 微辣
Transcriptions
Standard Mandarin
- Hanyu Pinyin: Wēi là
Yue: Cantonese
- Jyutping: Mei^{4} lat^{6}
- Website: weilamanner.com

Manner Culture Ltd. (Chinese: 微辣文化有限公司; Portuguese: Manner Cultura Lda.) (Note: In 2023, Manner's website said its company name was Manner Culture Enterprises Limited (simplified Chinese: 微辣文化集团有限公司; traditional Chinese: 微辣文化集團有限公司). The company name registered with the Legal Affairs Bureau and the Cultural Development Fund of the Macao Special Administrative Region Government is Manner Culture Limited (Chinese: 微辣文化有限公司).) is a Macau entertainment company. The company produces comedic videos in Cantonese that can be between a few seconds to a few minutes. It used to have 31 or more performing artists under management.

Manner was founded in June 2013 by Sixtycents, Jacky Lei, and Nathan Lam in Macau. It became popular after it published a nine-second viral video set in a Macau McDonald's titled "When buying ice cream, don't be distracted", in which a woman who is distracted by her cell phone grabs the ice cream part of an ice cream cone from the cashier. The company expanded to Hong Kong in 2018 through a seven-figure investment from an undisclosed investor. Its revenue is primarily from advertising. It has made sponsored videos for Alipay, the Hong Kong Police Force, and Royal Dansk. Roughly 80% of its advertising revenue is from Hong Kong companies or organisations. Manner created a physical store called Laji in Sé, Macau, that sells Manner-branded snacks and souvenirs. Its revenue was over HKD$10 million (US$1,287,001.29) in 2017.

Manner posts videos on social networking services and online video platforms including Facebook, Instagram, YouTube, Sina Weibo, Meipai, Miaopai, Sohu, and iQIYI. It had accumulated three billion video views and over 3.5 million followers on these sites by 2018. The Macau Post Daily called Manner "one of the biggest YouTube channels in South East Asia". Former employee Jane Lao died by suicide on July 26, 2023. Her suicide note said Manner's management had intimidated her, while netizens and Manner employees had cyberbullied her. After criticism from netizens and brands cut ties with the company, Manner announced on August 10, 2023, that it would temporarily suspend its operations.

== History ==
=== Foundation ===
Manner was founded in June 2013 as a joint venture by three Macau people, Sixtycents, Jacky Lei and Nathan Lam. (Note: Another source says Manner was founded in August 2013 by two Macau people, Sixtycents and Jacky Lei.) Sixtycents is responsible for coming with ideas and the creative direction while Lei is responsible for directing, film editing, and working with clients. They rented space in an industrial building as their office. Initially, Manner took up a small office but by 2017, they occupied half of an entire building. The founders chose the name "Manner" by using Google Translate to translate the Chinese word for "attitude" into English. They were given the name "Manner" and liked the sound of it so chose it as the group's name. On second thought, they found the English name to be too serious so they chose a less serious Chinese name. The company's English name "Manner" mimics the sound of its Chinese name, 微辣, which has the literal meaning of "slightly spicy". The name represents the company's goal to stimulate thinking. The group's Chinese slogan is "生活的調味", which means "seasoning for (daily) life", while its English counterpart is "Taste Happiness". They specialise in making comedic videos that range from a few seconds to a few minutes.

During Sixtycents' university years, he began producing short films. Through part-time work with his partner in filming and performing magic, they saved up HK$20,000 (US$2,574), which they used to self-fund their first film. The cast and production crew were all friends who participated for fun and were not paid. Initially, the group made music videos as well as covers of songs that they changed the lyrics of. When Manner was just established, they created the music video "Back then" (simplified Chinese: 想当年; traditional Chinese: 想當年) which changed the lyrics of the Joey Yung song "16th Lover" (simplified Chinese: 16号爱人; traditional Chinese: 16號愛人). According to Exmoo News, the song, which discussed childhood toys such as the spinning top and the Game Boy and memories of a first love, had "affecting lyrics and thoughtful pictures and earned big praise from netizens". The video received 10,000 likes. Despite the song's receiving attention online and in Hong Kong media, Manner did not receive any advertising requests. They self-funded the video, which cost several thousand dollars to make. They soon realised that the cost to make it was too high in both money and time. It took two to three months to produce a film. Members of the group started to leave as they graduated and had to make a living and provide monetary support for their family. Sixtycents visited Taiwan in 2015 for a summer vacation during which he learned from Internet celebrities and new media companies and resolved to change Manner's business model upon returning to Macau. He discovered that it was challenging to transform a passion into a career. Sixtycents revised their filming approach by focusing on making shorter clips like a nine-second clip that would make people laugh within a limited period of time.

Manner created a skit titled "When buying ice cream, don't be distracted" in which a female customer at a McDonald's in Macau is looking at her cell phone when she grabs the ice cream part of an ice cream cone. The fast food employee is startled. The skit quickly became viral, leading to its being shared 190,000 times on Weibo and its Facebook page receiving 50,000 new members in a night. By 2018, the video had received 2.83 million YouTube videos. The Macau Post Daily said that the video's popularity was "the beginning of one of the biggest YouTube channels in South East Asia". Its success led to Manner's creating more nine-second comedy videos. The song marked the start of Manner's popularity in Macau, Hong Kong, and Taiwan as well as the start of brands' seeking to advertise on Manner. Sixtycents observed that Macau is a city focused on gambling whose inhabitants largely look to other places such as Hong Kong, Taiwan, Japan, and China for entertainment. He hoped for Manner to be a venue for Macau performers to make a living while performing. In May 2018, Manner employees visited Kuala Lumpur in Malaysia to do a meetup with 2,000 fans. In May 2019, Manner employees visited Malaysia again to promote a film.

=== Expansion to Hong Kong ===
Manner invested in a Macau production company. The company expanded to Hong Kong in August 2018 to allow them to recruit local entertainment talent and to better tap into the mainland China market through the city. They rented from a friend of Sixtycents' a Kwun Tong office that could hold 20 people and set up a Sheung Wan dormitory for their employees who lived in Macau. Manner received a seven-figure investment from an undisclosed investor for the Hong Kong expansion. The investor had connections with people in the Hong Kong entertainment industry who Sixtycents believed would help Manner grow more quickly.

In 2018, Manner's equity was held by Sixtycents, Jacky Lei, and two executive directors. Sixtycents said, "We won't go public for the sake of going public. There's no rush." He emphasised that the most crucial thing was that the company's business become stable and that going public did not matter.

=== Suspension of operations ===
Jane Lao had been a Manner manager until her resignation on bad terms in 2021. When Lao left the company, she said founder Sixtycents had "cried" as he tried to retain her. Several Manner employees posted images of themselves with the crying filter, which came across as mocking Lao. The company had another conflict with her regarding sponsorships at the start of 2022. Lao died by suicide on July 26, 2023. The day before her death, she made a social media post detailing that after leaving Manner, she had social anxiety and depression which stemmed from online "haters" who had made cruel statements about her. Her suicide note suggested that Manner's management had intimidated her, while several of her Manner coworkers had cyberbullied her. In a post released the day of her death, Manner said her death did not stem from the behaviour of any Manner employees and announced a pause of its decennial gala. Celine Cheung, RSVP Communications' account director, criticised Manner's response to the suicide, saying it alienated the community by being phony and from a position of trying to protect themselves.

Within a week of Lao's death, the company's partnership deals with the Hong Kong brands 24/7 Fitness Hong Kong, THANN and 24 STORAGE were severed, while Manner artists Jeffrey Fok and Witness Kou resigned. Prior to Lao's death, the company's YouTube subscriber count reached 751,000. By 31 July the subscriber count dropped to 695,000. Manner announced on August 10, 2023, that the company would temporarily pause posting new content. Manner's CEO Sixtycents told artists that during the company's suspension, they were free to choose who to work with and determine how to further develop their careers. The company filed a notice to its landlord to terminate its office lease. By the end of September, photos were posted online showing Manner's office empty and its setup dismantled. Manner had closed its restaurant Manner Dai Pai Dong (Chinese: 微辣大排檔) and stopped having merchandise to sell on its online store named Manner Store (Chinese: 微辣士多) by October 2023. According to the influencer Sean Lam, the company soon started to struggle with paying debts.

== Members ==
Manner recruited heavily in summer 2017. In 2018, Manner had between 40 and 50 full-time employees with the remainder of the team being students whom they hired as part-time performers. Most employees in 2018 were in their twenties and born in 1994 or 1995 with few being born in the 1980s or earlier. Behind-the-scenes employees including screenwriters made a salary of $10,000 with the opportunity for bonuses based on the number of films and advertisements made. Sixtycents uses the OKR framework to hold employees accountable.

Manner in 2018 had 12 performing artists under management, including Carl Ao Ieong, Yelo, and Tina. Manner's performers each play a role that resembles the everyday friend, coworker, classmate, or family member. Their conversations represent the "inner voice buried in the hearts of ordinary people", the "kind of inner dialogue that cannot be spoken", said HK01.

- Sixtycents (simplified Chinese: 陆志豪; traditional Chinese: 陸志豪; born in 1993 or 1994 in Macau), known as 六毫子, is a co-founder of Manner. When he was an elementary school student, he was very quiet and had little interaction with other students. When he was 13 or 14 years old, he started to learn magic. He enjoyed performing it in front of an audience. He won first place in the Macau International Magician Association's Macau International Close-Up Magic competition when he was 14. Through his new hobby of magic, he became more social. As a student, he was not interested in school. He switched schools a total of seven times, including five times in secondary school. He was expelled from a school because he spoke too much and misbehaved. He attended one university and switched to a second one. He studied communication first and then tourism, each for one year, and eventually dropped out. When Sixtycents was 19 years old, a friend of his died in a traffic accident. The incident had a lasting impact on him, causing him to reflect on the fleetingness of life. Viewing human life as being like a falling star, Sixtycents wanted to live a bright and splendid life that even if short would not be filled with regret. He started Manner when he was 20 years old in 2013. Initially, Sixtycents was primarily responsible for the creative side of Manner. As Manner grew, he spent more of his energies on the business management side.
- Jacky Lei (simplified Chinese: 李伟麟; traditional Chinese: 李偉麟; born in 1992 or 1993) is a co-founder of Manner. He graduated with a university degree related to science and engineering. When he was in his second year of secondary school, he self-taught himself how to make special effects on the computer. Lei acts as a director and film editor. He funded the purchase of video production equipment through money he made from promotional films.
- Nathan Lam (simplified Chinese: 林茂发; traditional Chinese: 林茂發), known as Wasabi and 加蔥, previously worked in the marketing department of a casino and is an amateur magician. Lam has a secondary school education. After he collaborated with Sixtycents in their "Not Magic" (Chinese: 不是魔術) group, he started to be a guest performer in Manner videos. He started Manner as a joint venture with Sixtycents and Jacky Lei after he was impressed by their song "When Studies Become Mature" (simplified Chinese: 学业成熟时; traditional Chinese: 學業成熟時), which changed the lyrics of the song "When Grapes Become Mature" (simplified Chinese: 葡萄成熟时; traditional Chinese: 葡萄成熟時). In 2016, he quit his casino job and joined Manner to be an actor and screenwriter. He writes most of the skits he performs in. Originally, his name was Wasabi, but after he did a short film called "Eat Noodles, Add Onions" that received rave reviews, people started calling him "Add Onions" (Chinese: 加蔥), so he changed his name to "Add Onions". He performed in the short film "Nonsensical", which received attention from fans.
- Yelo (simplified Chinese: 黄晓晴; traditional Chinese: 黃曉晴) was introduced to Manner by Weng Chan and knew Sixtycents since her senior year of high school. After doing a job interview, she received a call the night before the Mid-Autumn Festival asking whether she wanted to join. She joined Manner part-time. While she was a student at the University of Macau's Department of Communication, she attended classes three days a week and did filming one or two days a week. She is a street dancer.
- Carl Ao Ieong (simplified Chinese: 欧阳仲豪; traditional Chinese: 歐陽仲豪; born in 1993 or 1994), known as 豪Dee, received a degree from the University of Macau's Department of Marketing in 2016. While he was still in university, he learned from Weng Chan that Manner needed an extra and was offering a $100 hourly salary. He took the job even though it was the day before his midterm exam. He later accepted Sixtycents' offer to join Manner to make films. The Hong Kong Economic Times said in 2018 that Ao Ieong was "Macau's most popular Internet celebrity" as he had 190,000 followers on Facebook and 100,000 on Instagram. Ao Ieong has acted as a taxicab driver, boyfriend, and soldier in Manner skits. He made a commercial with the entertainer Louis Cheung.
- Rachel Lau (simplified Chinese: 刘蕴晴; traditional Chinese: 劉蘊晴) grew up watching TVB. She made a short commercial film for the rice noodle chain Tamjai Yunnan Mixian with the TVB actress Rainbow Ching Hor Wai. For the commercial, she wrote and performed a song about family love. When she joined Manner, she wrote songs and did not intend to be an actress. Manner gave her a character to play and she grew into a key opinion leader. Rachel has a hummingbird tattoo on her back. When she was very little, she had ornithophobia which could have been caused by seeing a bloody chicken at the supermarket or from seeing a bird suddenly get close to her. To overcome her fear, she would look at birds every day. After doing this for a while, she found hummingbirds to be cute so decided to get a tattoo of it. In her second year of university, Rachel wrote and sang songs that she uploaded to her YouTube channel. After a Macau music company found her, she created her first album titled "0430". She received an accounting degree because she thought it would have good financial prospects.
- Jeffrey Fok (Chinese: 霍俊邦) was a hotel management university student who worked two years in hotel management after graduation. He wanted to make films but could not find enough time to do in his job so he resigned and took a paycut to join Manner as an entertainer. He is a boxer and part-time model. In his youth, he enjoyed playing basketball, helped his secondary school team go from the fourth division to the first division and win the championship, and wished to play basketball for the rest of his life. But shortly after secondary school graduation, he was riding a bicycle in the rain and an old woman with an umbrella suddenly darted out in front of him. He swerved to avoid hitting her, fell, and suffered serious injuries that led to the doctor's telling him not to ever do strenuous exercise including basketball again. The accident also ended his dream to become a police officer.
- Sofia Paiva (simplified Chinese: 麦嘉欣; traditional Chinese: 麥嘉欣; born in 1996 or 1997) won the Miss International Macau 2017 title and competed in Miss International. Paiva is mixed race with Chinese and Portuguese heritage. She started the FiDan Siblings group with her brother to compete in the Taiwanese singing competition Million Star. She uploaded YouTube videos discussing makeup tips. On 4 October 2019, Manner announced on Instagram that Paiva would be joining the group. She received a psychology degree from the University of Saint Joseph in 2020.
- Sulin Ip (simplified Chinese: 叶苏霖; traditional Chinese: 葉蘇霖; born in 1994) won the Miss International Macau 2016 title and competed in Miss International where she reached the top 15. She appeared on the TVB game show Liza's Online in a collaboration between TVB and Manner.
- Joao Ramos (Chinese: 拉莫斯), known as 雷諾, Black Joe, and Joe, is a member of Manner. Nicknamed the "African Tiger", Of mixed Angola and Portuguese ancestry, he grew up in Macau and became fluent in Cantonese after he and his family moved from Angola to Macau in his youth because of the Angolan Civil War. Ramos is a Muay Thai practitioner who has garnered numerous Macau fans who support him when he competes. He began practicing Muay Thai when he was 17 years old so that he could fight better with his friends, whom he frequently lost playful fights to as a skinny youth. He trained in Phuket, Thailand. In a 2017 competition, he was a contestant in the 65-kilogram (143 lb) division. A full-time boxer who practices nearly daily, he has competed in Muay Thai boxing rings including in the Kunlun Fight. In an interview with HK01 in 2019, Ramos said he was in his 30s and planned to retire after finishing two more boxing competitions that year. He participated in two Hong Kong films, Isabella and Poker King. Through his being an acquaintance of Sixtycents and because he was interested in making films, he joined Manner. He has acted in numerous comedic roles for Manner including as a construction worker and as a man wearing women's clothing.
- Weng Chan (simplified Chinese: 陈康荣; traditional Chinese: 陳康榮), known as 雞Wing, is one of the earliest members of Manner, recalling that they used to film videos using their cell phones. Chan knew Sixtycents when they were in secondary school because they both enjoyed making movies. Chan had a cameo in the 2019 Hong Kong film Missbehavior. He collaborated with another Manner member, Wonton, on "Wonton Called Chicken" (simplified Chinese: 云吞叫埋鸡; traditional Chinese: 雲吞叫埋雞), a series of videos. Chan and Wonton came up with each episode's theme. While Chan took care of the filming and editing, Wonton found the guests and filming locations.
- Isabelle Ip (born in 1994 or 1995; simplified Chinese: 叶佩男; traditional Chinese: 葉佩男), known as Puinam (佩男) and Older Sister (家姐), joined Manner in January 2019. Ip appeared as a guest in a 2017 episode of the Manner video series "Wonton Called Chicken" (simplified Chinese: 云吞叫埋鸡; traditional Chinese: 雲吞叫埋雞) and received praise from netizens. In 2020, she had over 280,000 followers on Instagram. She is the older sister of Yuki Ip, who is also a member of Manner. With her sister, she hosted the 2020 ViuTV show Home Field Goal (Chinese: 帶你到主場). A model, she has received attention from numerous brands. The Macao Daily News said she has a "hearty and playtful personality and beautiful appearance that has made her become more and more popular among netizens".
- Yuki Ip (born in 1995 or 1996; simplified Chinese: 叶思男; traditional Chinese: 葉思男), known as Sinam (思男) and Younger Sister (阿妹), is a member of Manner. She is the younger sister of Isabelle Ip. With her sister, she hosted the 2020 ViuTV show Home Field Goal (Chinese: 帶你到主場).
- Roberto Madan (born in 1997; simplified Chinese: 马檇铿; traditional Chinese: 馬檇鏗) is a songer-songwriter and member of Manner. Madan is of Chinese, British, and Indian ancestry. Chessman Entertainment signed Madan as an artist when he was 16 years old. Since his family wanted him to focus on his studies, he did not renew the six-month contract. Madan visited Hong Kong weekly for singing lessons. He became an independent singer when he was 18 years old. He received a music award from TDM when he was 18. Madan was overweight when he was in primary school, which he attributed to his love of eating and urging by his mother. When he was in secondary school, he looked at himself in the mirror and found himself to be obese and would have difficulty to find a girlfriend. One time, after he played a basketball game, in referring to Madan, an opposing team's coach told his coach, "If he keeps getting fatter, he will not be able to play anymore." The mirror and basketball incidents motivated him to lose weight and begin weightlifting. Madan joined Manner in 2018 and originally only sang. He later grew interested in acting which led to more people internationally become aware of him. When he was just a singer, his audience was primarily people in Macau. Once he began acting, people from Hong Kong, Taiwan, and Malaysia grew aware of him. Madan sang the Cantonese version of the theme song for Us and Them. He had a role in the 2020 film Missbehavior.
- Tina Chan (simplified Chinese: 陈欣; traditional Chinese: 陳欣), known as 陳田娜, joined Manner because she enjoyed acting, had spare time outside of her studies, and enjoyed working with other Manner employees who were close in age to her. In her Manner films, she wears Japanese attire, acts in cute roles, and acts as a wife who henpecks her husband. She debuted her photo album at the Hong Kong Book Fair in 2019 and planned to publish a cookbook.
- Edward Lei (simplified Chinese: 李宇轩; traditional Chinese: 李宇軒) has acted in numerous skits and micro movies. He usually acts in comedic roles and according to the Macao Daily News, he is "also good at performing distressing and tear-jerking roles". Manner co-founder Sixtycents was his classmate. After Lei, who was interested in acting, saw online clips of Sixtycents' videos, he expressed his interest to make films with Sixtycents. Sixtycents said he would think about it and then invited Lei to join.
- Rosalina Lei (Chinese: 李熙媛), known as R, frequently plays the role of a teacher in Manner films because of her "gentle and generous appearance" according to the Macao Daily News. Her childhood dream job was to become a teacher. Another frequent role she portrays is a gong nui. Before she joined Manner, co-founder Sixtycents was her friend and mentioned to her that Manner's advertising department needed staffing. In college, Lei had been the director of her student union's public relations department, where she spoke with companies to seek sponsorships. As she considered herself well-suited for working in Manner's advertising department, she joined the company. She spent approximately one year in that position, after which she switched to an on-camera role because she enjoyed performing and wanted to share her ideas with the audience. By March 2019, she had been at Manner for a little over two years.
- Sophie Lei (Chinese: 李靖茹), known as 蘇菲, has filmed several videos for Manner. She attended an American university abroad before returning to Macau. Lei enjoys fitness and cooking.
- Hugo Chen (simplified Chinese: 陈建博; traditional Chinese: 陳建博) is a member of Manner whose "expressionless" face during skits was well received by viewers who called him a "poker-faced comedian". Before joining Manner, he was acquainted with members of Manner's creative department because several years prior, he had helped worked on a music video with them. Manner approached him with the suggestion that he play a role they felt was well-suited to him. Chen agreed to the role after reviewing the script which he found hilarious. The audience reception to the character, who adopted an expressionless face, was very positive, so he continued playing it in several more skits. Chen said he enjoyed the freedom the performers had to "say no" to participating in any scripts that they consider unsuitable.
- Gong Lau (Chinese: 江流) is a screenwriter for Manner and a film enthusiast. During the COVID-19 pandemic in Macau, he remained at home and watched numerous movies. He created a YouTube channel called "Youngster Gong Lau's Movie Watching Diary" (simplified Chinese: 少年江流的观影日志; traditional Chinese: 少年江流的觀影日誌) where he shared his film analysis. The channel received 10,000 subscribers in one month. Gong Lau said that "good movies are worth watching more than once". His strategy is to watch movies three times. He focuses on the plot the first time, the film frames the second time, and the actors' performances the third time.
- Doris Lee (Chinese: 李天慧), known as 多多 and 多姐, is a member of Manner. When she entered university, she was deciding between studying communication or education and settled upon communication. She received a degree from the University of Macau's Department of Communication. A graduation requirement was to create a film. After observing her performance in the film "Girl" when she was a third-year college student, Manner co-founder Sixtycents was impressed with Lee's acting skills and asked her to become a Manner member. As a child, she frequently draped herself in blankets to pretend she was wearing ancient costumes and pretended she was a mother while hugging a baby doll. As an adult, she enjoyed mimicking the expressions and tone of people she saw on television with her sister. After graduating from college, she joined Manner full-time and for a month after joining she was uncertain about what artistic direction to take before deciding to focus on makeup. On her fan pages, Lee published videos about makeup tips and released a series of beauty products. A frequent role Lee portrays in Manner videos is a goddess who attracts the attention of numerous men. She received attention in mainland China after filming a 10-second comedic video for Manner called "打包", which has two meanings, the first being to pack up a leftover meal and the second being to hit a bun. Lee travelled to Taiwan to film a music video with the singer-songwriter Eric Chou.
- Wonton (simplified Chinese: 云吞; traditional Chinese: 雲吞) made micro movies during college which led to him joining Manner. He frequently portrays women in comedy skits. Manner co-founder Sixtycents was the originator of the idea for Wonton to portray women. Wonton acted as a breastfeeding mother for the Breastfeeding Association in an advertising skit titled "No more loneliness in the road to breastmilk" (simplified Chinese: 不再孤独的母乳路; traditional Chinese: 不再孤獨的母乳路). In 2019, Wonton created a new program called "Wonton and Big Sister" (simplified Chinese: 云吞家姐; traditional Chinese: 雲吞家姐) which he co-hosted with Puinam. In the show, he and Puinam visited new restaurants that were recommend by netizens to introduce those restaurants.

== Social media and video platforms ==
Manner has accounts on multiple social networking services and online video platforms including Facebook, Instagram, YouTube, Sina Weibo, Meipai, and Miaopai. Manner released 326 skits in 2017. In 2018, Manner had three billion video views and over 3.5 million followers on these sites. Roughly two million of its audience members in 2018 lived in Guangdong, which is where most of its audience is from. The rest are from the other parts of mainland China, Hong Kong, Macau, and Taiwan. In mainland China, audience members view its videos on Sohu, iQIYI, and Miaopai. Its audience members are largely between 18 and 35 years old. According to Exmoo News, Manner is the "KOL platform in Macau with the widest audience". Its videos are posted on Asian diaspora Facebook groups such as Subtle Asian Traits and Subtle Cantonese Traits.

== Cantonese language ==
The company creates Cantonese films. Sixtycents noted that the performers grew up speaking Cantonese and viewed it as a culture and way of life. The group produces videos that do not avoid Cantonese profanity because they view it as the essence of Cantonese. As the actors are not proficient in Mandarin Chinese, the group was disinclined to make videos in Mandarin to try to attract the mainland Chinese market. Furthermore, as there are geographical and linguistic differences in humour, the comedic material they were creating in Cantonese was not easily transferable to Mandarin. The Macau writers and actors are heavily influenced by consuming Hong Kong television dramas, movies, and songs, which are predominantly in Cantonese. Although Manner is focused on the Cantonese market, some audience members who only understand Cantonese watch their content through by relying on subtitles for understanding and to learn Cantonese culture.

== English subtitles ==
Manner pays people to create funny English subtitles for their videos. Its executive director acknowledged that their subtitles are "unusual" because "Poor English is part of Macau's culture because our two official languages are Chinese and Portuguese". They once had a professional translator of their videos. One day, a video's director had to perform the translation because she was travelling. The director's substandard English translations were well received by their audience. In one example, they translated "angry at me" (Chinese: 嬲) into "boy girl boy me" owing to the spelling of the Chinese character.

== Videos ==
HK01 wrote that Manner makes "short films that are all lighthearted, humorous, and make people belly laugh". Exmoo News called Manner's videos "funny and thought-provoking or ironic". In addition to its skits, Manner produces reality shows, variety shows, standalone drama episodes, and live music shows. The Macau scholar and cultural critic Li Zhanpeng found that Manner has a substantial influence on online viewers but that its material is "decontextualised" into a "very silly situational joke". He hoped that Manner would spark the Macau people to engage in dialogue though he recognised that Macau has a small audience and that Manner's audience is international and its content must appeal to them too.

According to Manner director Sixtycents, online audiences have short attention spans so generally will not appreciate videos longer than 10 minutes. In the past, Manner created a series of videos that ranged from six to 10 minutes. They would release one video per week. Sixtycents found that instead of watching each video as it is released, their audience would wait until all 10 videos in the series were released before watching all of them at once. Now, instead of releasing these 70-minute videos on Instagram and Facebook, Manner releases them on film sites such as iQIYI where users are more receptive to watching videos on the weekly release cadence. Video ideas are discussed during a weekly "Creation Club" meeting. If an idea was approved by the club, it would be filmed. The creator would receive a bonus based on how many likes the video received. During the meetings, they would think of how to improve on the proposed ideas.

Manner does not directly discuss politics. It indirectly discussed politics in a video that alludes to how the long delays and cost overruns of Macau Light Rapid Transit, which has angered many Macau people. The video said that light trail is the ghost feared by the Macau people (the words "light rail" and "ghost" have the same pronunciation in Cantonese). Manner produced a video titled "Some things when done by males is considered strange" that discusses how women can do some things without having their sexuality questioned that men cannot. In the video, two males hold hands, eat the same food, and take a shower together. Upon observing this, their two women friends feel it is weird, question why the males are so intimate, and wonder whether the males are gay.

After Typhoon Hato and Tropical Storm Pakhar caused destruction in Macau in 2017, Sixtycents changed the lyrics of the Japanese song "Always With Me" (the closing theme song for the film Spirited Away) and had the song performed by a Macau band to celebrate the rescuers and volunteers who were helping the storm victims. They included clips of people helping each other in the aftermath of the storm in the music video. They uploaded the music video to Facebook. The video received 210,000 likes in 14 hours. Manner's actors, Carl Ao Ieong, Puinam, and Yelo, performed for Hacken Lee's music video for the 2020 song Fairy Tales, which is about a couple who are unable to meet face-to-face because of the COVID-19 pandemic. They have to order takeout and kindle their love through video.

Manner released a comedic video in 2017 about a son who went to great lengths to borrow money from his mother. He tells her that he lacks money, wants to start a family, and needs the red envelope money and interest on it that she had held on for him. The mother tells him that he should not be able to find a girlfriend given what he looks like. The son comes out and says he had a pregnant boyfriend who needs money. In a fit of despair, the mother pretends to be sick, spits out blood, says she has no money left, and bemoans that she was not a good mother. The mother and son go back and forth multiple times with more trickery so that it is not possible to recognise who is who. In the end, an important person appears and the son gives up. They released a 15-second video about how people with the 12 different astrological signs look like when they sleep. The camera shows a single person who looks exactly the same for all 12 constellations. Netizens responded "What did I just watch" and "The most accurate constellation analysis in history".

== Theatre shows ==
In 2018, Manner performed two showings of a magic and musical show titled "Maybe Funny" (Chinese: 可能好笑) at the Macao Cultural Centre. Starring Sixtycents, Nathan Lam, Rachel Lau, and Yelo; it has the themes of time, health, work, and marriage. With Rachel acting as the storyteller who sang songs that connected the show's scenes, Yelo was responsible for the dancing parts of the show. Sixtycents and Lam Mao Fat performed magic. Tickets for the Macau showings were sold out in 30 minutes. In 2019, they performed the show in Hong Kong at the Hong Kong Baptist University where they sold over a thousand tickets.

In 2020, Manner performed five showings on three days of the play "Merry Christmas from Island God" (simplified Chinese: 岛神的快乐圣诞; traditional Chinese: 島神的快樂聖誕) at The Parisian Macao's theatre. The play stars three foolish young people, who are played by Nathan Lam acting as a sighing pork meat seller, Ah Tai as a cynical hip hop singer, and Alex Ng as an insurance broker. The three are travelling around the world on a hot air balloon and after a mishap, they are stranded on a deserted island. The youths encounter the "Island God" (played by Ho Bak), a pretty fairy with a sweet voice (played by Rachel Lau), and three warmhearted island natives (played by Carl Ao Ieong, Isabelle Ip, and Tina Chan). The "Island God" grants them three wishes which leads to some magical and comedic incidents. The Macao Daily News said the play "releases funny positive energy and presents a wonderful and unforgettable performance to the audience".

== Advertising ==
Manner receives numerous advertising requests. The first advertisement Manner made was in 2014. Manner made an advertisement music video on 20 May 2016 titled "520" that modified the lyrics of the Hebe Tien song "A Little Happiness" that discussed the relationship between a boyfriend and girlfriend. In Mandarin, "520" has a similar sound to "I love you", while in Cantonese, "520" has a similar sound to "Don't want you". It received 3.9 million views on Facebook. Manner made a sponsored video in 2017 for Royal Dansk's blue tin cookies starring Manner personality Carl Ao Ieong and the celebrity Louis Cheung, who played Ao Ieong's older cousin. The video, which was about how the blue tin cookies saved the two cousins, went viral.

Its revenue of HKD$10 million (US$1,287,001.29) in 2017 largely came from fulfilling the advertising requests. Roughly 70% to 80% of their revenue is from advertising, and about 80% of the companies or organisations with whom they have advertising deals are in Hong Kong. Manner made a crime prevention video for the Hong Kong Police Force. Companies they have made ads for include Alipay, the Yeung Gwong drink, and the electronics chain store Broadway. People they have made ads for include Eason Chan, Joey Yung, Eddie Peng, Wan Kwong, and Nancy Sit.

== Commerce ==
Starting in 2017, Manner has begun operating in the food and drink industry such as investing in a restaurant and bar and creating advertisements promoting restaurants. The restaurant and bar allowed singers to share their voice to restaurant patrons. They began considering entering the products space after thinking of the slogan "睇趣片 食脆片" which means "Watch funny videos, eat crispy snacks" in which in Cantonese "funny" and "crispy" are different words but are pronounced the same. It created Manner-branded snacks that have Manner personalities on the packaging. It created the Laji brand that sells souvenirs such as Chinese almond biscuits and beef jerky. When they first started making snacks, they found it more expensive than they had anticipated as Macau had very few factories, and it was expensive to pay for labour and materials.

=== Laji ===
In August 2018, Manner opened a physical store to sell Macau souvenirs. Called Laji (Chinese: 辣記), the store was located close to the Ruins of Saint Paul's at Travessa dos Anjos in Sé, Macau. The store had a large television that broadcasts Manner's videos. It sold Phoenix egg rolls, Chinese almond biscuits, and beef jerky and its products had a slightly spicy taste. The products had "funny and weird packaging" in that the Phoenix egg rolls' wrapping looked like that of feminine hygiene products, while the almond biscuits' wrapping looked like that of condoms. Laji offered discounts that were gimmicks. Since it is challenging to find parking in Macau, Laji gave customers free beef jerky if they show a parking ticket they have received. Despite substantial investment in it, the Laji physical store closed after fewer than six months. Manner did not realise how much time and money it would take to run the store. They switched to online selling of their products such as mugs and T-shirts to increase the profit margin and reduce the time investment.

=== Manner Dai Pai Dong ===
Using the same name as one of the company's shows, Sixtycents founded a restaurant at Sha Tin's New Town Plaza called Manner Dai Pai Dong (Chinese: 微辣大排檔). To prepare the restaurant for its opening, he spent eight figures. From planning to its opening on 3 December 2022, it took three years owing to the COVID-19 pandemic, which led to multiple delays. The restaurant's four sections each had a theme: a subway car, a mahjong school, ferry seats in the Hong Kong and Macau styles, and an old-fashioned ice room. The restaurant received negative reviews for poor service and poor-quality food, leading its closure by October 2023.

== Comparison to 100Most ==
In reference to the satirical Hong Kong magazine 100Most, Manner has been called "Macau's 100Most" because both produce funny content. Manner co-founder Sixtycents objected to the 100Most characterisation, noting that Manner does not touch directly on politics. He further noted that 100Most is focused on the publishing business, whereas Manner is involved in various media.
