= Telecommunications in Macau =

With Macau's small population (about 680,000) and market, only a few local media options are available for the local people. Because radio signals, newspapers and magazines from Hong Kong are available in Macau, the local media are always a minority group in terms of sales and number of viewers.

== Newspapers ==
There are eighteen newspapers (twelve in Chinese, four in Portuguese and two in English). O Mun Yat Po or Macau Daily News) is owned by the Chinese Communist Party and has the largest circulation (4,000). Additionally, Chinese-language newspapers from Hong Kong are popular.

Macau has eight Chinese-language, three Portuguese-language and two English-language dailies. The Macau Daily Times is Macau's only English-language newspaper edited seven days a week. Macau Post Daily is published from Monday to Friday. It is owned by a local publishing company, Everbright Co. Ltd., which is locally owned.

== Radio ==
There are 250,000 radios; two twenty-hour FM radio stations, one Portuguese, one Chinese; and four AM stations. Hong Kong radio stations also are popular in Macau.

- Radio broadcast stations: AM 1, FM 2, shortwave 0 (2005)
- Radios: 160,000 (1997)

== Television ==
There are 70,300 television sets (1997 estimate); two general television channels from TDM: one Portuguese and one Chinese. Hong Kong television networks TVB and ViuTV can be received and are widely watched by Macau residents.

- Television broadcast stations: 3 (2006)
- Televisions: 49,000 (1997)

Macau government owns the television station called TDM. It has 16 digital television channels (6 channels are its own channel, 1 channel for transmitting TDM radio, 9 channels are transmitting television channels from mainland China).

== Telephone ==
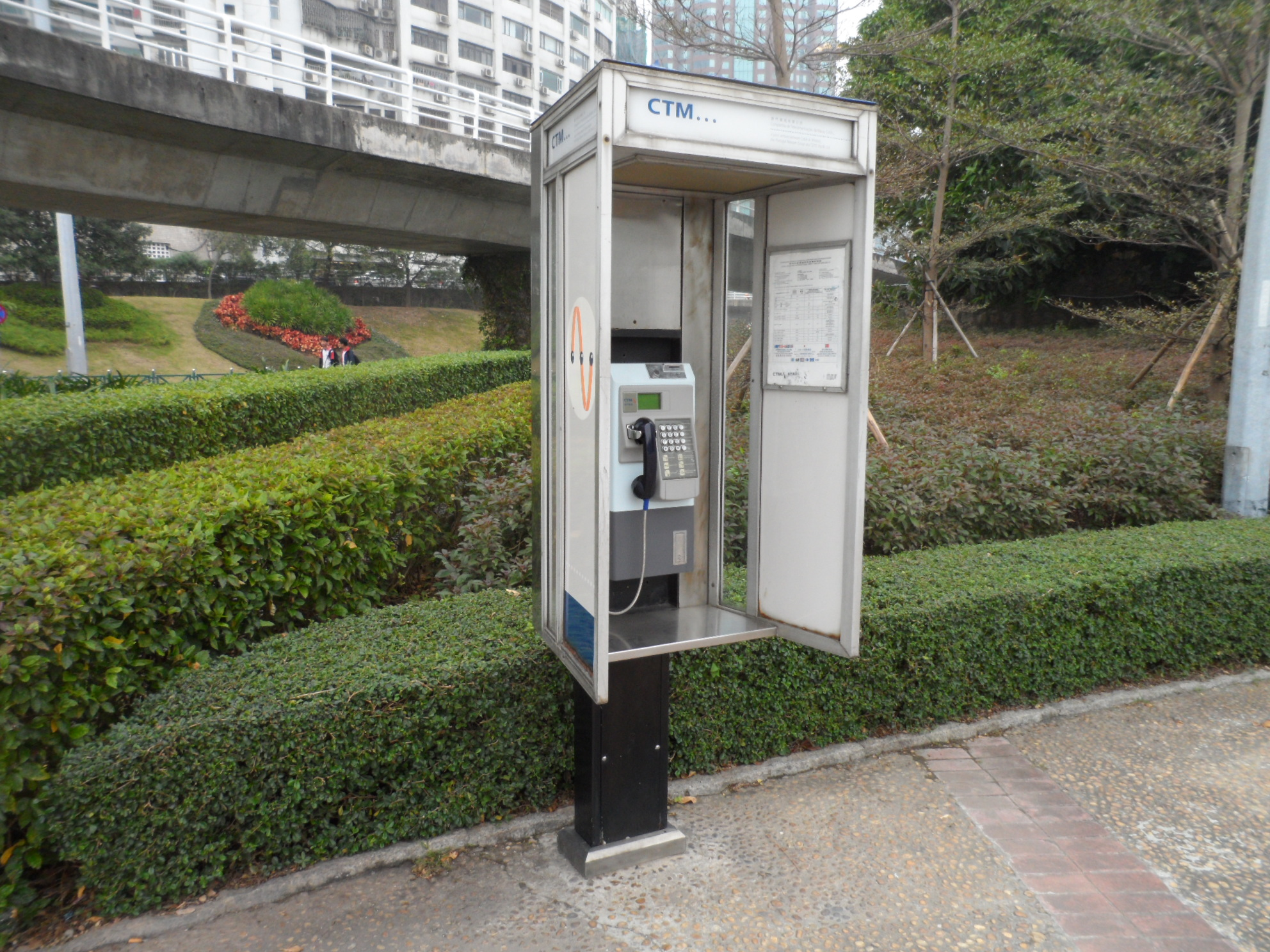
CTM telephone booth

The number of telephone lines has been increasing since the mid-1990s. In 1997 there were 222,456 telephones; by 1999, 300,066 lines were in use. In 1999 there were 686 telephone lines per 1,000 people. Cellular-telephone-use statistics were not available. International access is via Hong Kong and Mainland China and via Intelsat (Indian Ocean). Alcatel-Lucent was granted a contract in February 2007 to collocate a CDMA2000 1xEV-DO (Revision A) high-speed wireless network in Macau for China Unicom. Following the completion of the upgrades in related software and hardware, China Unicom will be equipped with the facilities needed to provide high-speed mobile data services for users in Macau, including broadcasting and video telephony.

- Telephone main lines in use: 175,592 (July 2006)
- Mobile cellular telephones: 325,016 (July 2006)

Telephone system: fairly modern communication facilities maintained for domestic and international services

- domestic: N/A
- international: HF radiotelephone communication facility; access to international communications carriers provided via Hong Kong and Mainland China; satellite earth station - 1 Intelsat (Indian Ocean)
- Users: 88,653 (2005)

3 Macau is the only carrier to offer VoWiFi. SmarTone MAC is the only carrier not yet to offer VoLTE, till its operation ceased.

On 21 August 2024, The Macau SAR Government has received an application from SmarTone to forgo the 4G license and plans to cease renewing the 3G license after expiration. According to the Post and Telecommunications Bureau (CTT), SmarTone (at that time) had a relatively small market share in Macau, only a single-digit percentage.

=== Mobile phone operators ===
Brand	Operator	Status	Bands (MHz)
CTM	C.T.M. Telemovel+	Operational	LTE FDD 900 / 1800 / 2100; NR FDD 700 / 2100; NR TDD 3500 / 4900
3 Macau	Hutchison Telecom	Operational	LTE FDD 900 / 1800
China Telecom (Macau)	China Telecom	Operational	LTE FDD 850 / 1800 / 2100; NR FDD 700 / 2100; NR TDD 3500
SmarTone MAC	SmarTone Macau	Not operational	UMTS 2100; LTE FDD 1800

=== Decommissioning of GSM ===
GSM mobile phone networks for consumers in Macau were set to be decommissioned in July 2012. Networks will only be left in place for visitors to roam onto. The planned shutdown will make Macau be the first region in the world to phase out networks using the GSM standard, but it was postponed until 2019.

== Internet ==
Internet service providers (ISPs): CTM (Companhia de Telecomunicações de Macau S.A.R.L.), MTel

Country code (Top level domain): .mo

=== Broadband Internet access ===
The Macao Telecommunications Company (CTM) in 2000 launched the first broadband Internet access in the territory, on a network built by Cisco Systems.

MTel Telecommunications also provides broadband internet service and is CTM's main competitor, though much smaller market share.

=== Censorship ===
Macau is outside the Great Firewall, therefore there is no internet censorship besides illegal content in Macau.

== See also ==
- Media of Macau
- Communications in Hong Kong
- Communications in Taiwan
- Communications in China
- List of Chinese-language television channels
- CTM (Macau)
