= Metis TransPacific Airlines =

Supposed Chinese airline service

The creators of Metis TransPacific Airlines website altered John Yu's copyrighted photograph of TF-AMK, an Air Atlanta Icelandic Boeing 747-312, to make the aircraft in the photograph look like an airliner owned by the company; the company mistakenly stated that the aircraft is a Boeing 747-400

Metis TransPacific Charter Airlines was a supposed airline service based in Macau, China. It was to provide commercial air service between Macau and Vancouver, British Columbia, Canada. The air service never did launch, claiming lack of available aircraft with the ability to fulfill the transpacific flights on a non-stop flight path, in the market at startup (2006/2007).

Metis TransPacific Charter Airlines, without success, did attempt three separate launch dates between June 2006 and December 2007. Metis TransPacific Charter Airlines was given approvals from both Macau SAR, China civil aviation and Canadian civil aviation authorities.

== As advertised by the company ==
Founded by Christopher Colbourne, this entity started to solicit passengers on April 8, 2007; its last official launch date was December 14, 2007. The airline stated on the website that "'THE GRINCH' stole Christmas" and the supposed launch date has been postponed until January 24, 2008. According to its website, the first flight was to Vancouver from Macau, making it the first airline, charter or frontline carrier, to offer flights from Macau to Vancouver BC Canada, original launch special was at a cost of 1,500 Hong Kong dollars per seat.

Primaris Airlines had offered to operate on behalf of "Métis TransPacific Airlines".

As of February 21, 2008, the website was blank except for a notice that the page is "under construction." As of December 2010, the website was completely offline.

== Existence questioned ==
Due to the unusually low claim price of the tickets, and the fact that the websites of Macau International Airport and Vancouver International Airport carried no mention of such an airline, even as a charter airline, it had raised many doubts which were all dismissed when none of the 1532 paid passengers registered any complaints after a full year. Skytrax had issued an article with its CEO Eduard Plaisted claiming it was a spoof operation. This article was retracted and erased from its website.

The photo on Metis TransPacific's website was photoshopped from a photo posted to the Airliners.net website, with a reworked version of the logo of Bali Air.

An article in the Macau Daily Times expressed concerns that the airline had repeatedly postponed its first flight, that the company owner was not contactable, and that the Civil Aviation Authority had passed the case to the Judiciary Police.

== See also ==
- List of companies of Macau
