= Pangea (cable system) =

Submarine telecommunications cable system

Pangea North and Pangea South
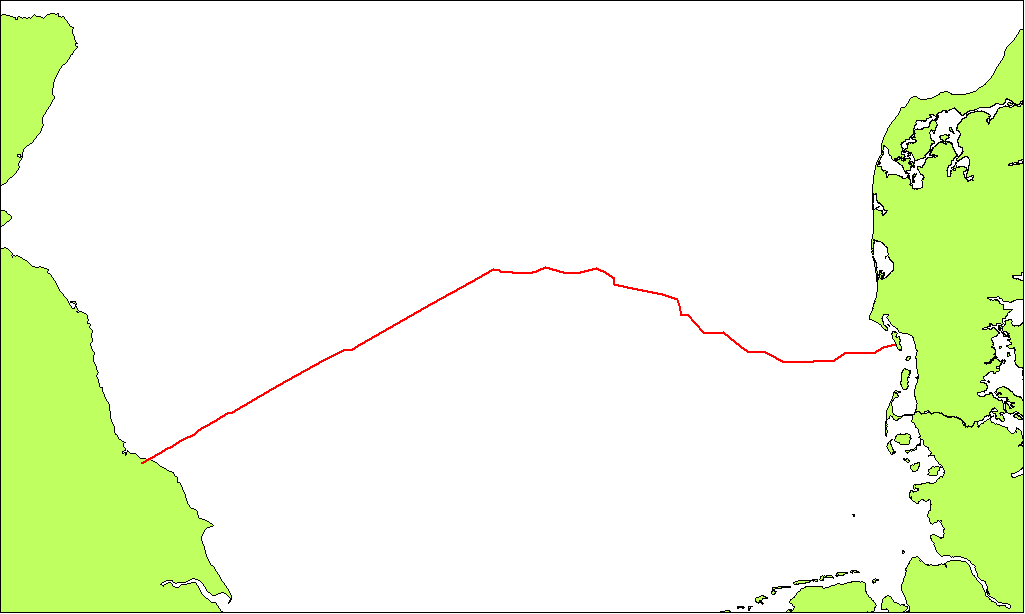
- Landing points: Pangea North; Redcar, England; Fanø, Denmark; Måde, Denmark; Pangea South; Lowestoft, England; Beverwijk, Netherlands
- Total length: 937 km
- Design capacity: 7.2 Tbit/s
- Date of first use: 2001

Pangea is a submarine telecommunications cable system transiting the North Sea connecting UK with Denmark and Netherlands. By 2002, it was no longer in service. It consisted of two widely separated submarine segments - Pangea North and Pangea South.

Pangea North segment of length 685 km had landing points at:

- Redcar, England, UK
- Fanø, Denmark

From Fanø, an island off the coast of Jutland, there was an onwards section to the mainland, landing near Esbjerg at:

- Måde, Denmark

Pangea South segment of length 252 km had landing points at:

- Lowestoft, England, UK
- Beverwijk, Netherlands

The cable systems were deployed as a part of a larger effort by the network operator, Pangea Europe Limited, to connect countries in the Nordic region. However, the company already had economic difficulties in September 2001, and bankruptcy was filed in 2002 shortly after Pangea was finished. The cable ownership was transferred first to Arrowhead and Nortel and then to become a part of Linx Telecom (now CITIC Telecom CPC) later in 2004.

== Maps ==
- "Kingfisher Cable Awareness Chart, North Sea Central" (PDF). Archived from the original (PDF) on August 16, 2006.
- "Kingfisher Cable Awareness Chart, North Sea South" (PDF). Archived from the original (PDF) on August 16, 2006.
