= Lotus TV Macau =

Television channel in Macau

- Broadcast area: International
- Headquarters: Macau

Programming
- Languages: Cantonese, Mandarin, English (during movies)
- Picture format: 4:3 576i (SDTV) (2002-2018); 16:9 1080i (HDTV) (2018-present)

Ownership
- Owner: George Lu

History
- Launched: 28 October 2002

Links
- Website: http://www.macaulotustv.cc/

Availability

Streaming media
- Lotus TV Live: http://www.lotusbtv.com/live.asp/

Chinese name
- Traditional Chinese: 澳門蓮花衛視傳媒有限公司
- Simplified Chinese: 澳门莲花卫视传媒有限公司
Transcriptions
Standard Mandarin
- Hanyu Pinyin: àomén liánhuā wèishì chuánméi yǒuxiàngōngsī

Portuguese name
- Portuguese: Macau Lotus TV Media via Satélite, Limitada

Lotus TV Macau, owned by Macau Lotus TV Media via Satélite, Limitada, is a Macanese satellite TV channel broadcast via satellite through Apstar 7.

It mainly offers movies, cultural, news and interview programmes.

== History ==
Launched on 28 October 2002, it was granted permission to become a Macau satellite TV licensing company on 1 December 2008 by the Macau government.

== See also ==
- Media of Macau
