= Va Kio Daily =

Newspaper published in Macau

- Traditional Chinese: 華僑報
- Simplified Chinese: 华侨报
- Literal meaning: Overseas Chinese Newspaper
Transcriptions
Standard Mandarin
- Hanyu Pinyin: Huáqiáo Bào
Yue: Cantonese
- Jyutping: waa4 kiu4 bou3

Va Kio Daily (Chinese: 華僑報) is an independent Chinese-language daily newspaper published in Macau, China.

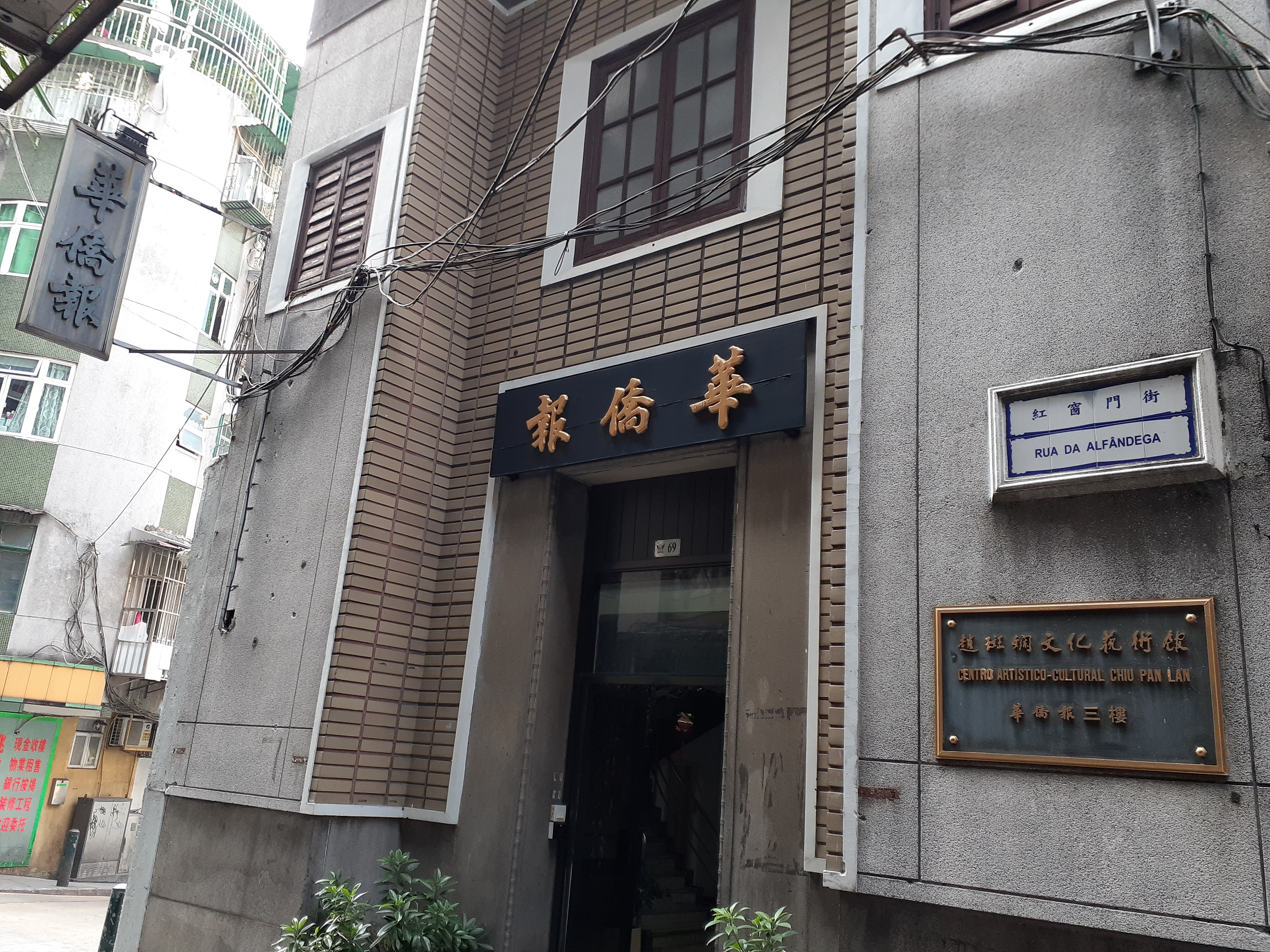
Va Kio Daily

== History ==
The newspaper was established in 1937 in Portuguese Macau.

== See also ==
- Media of Macau
