= Yelo (influencer) =

Macanese street dancer (born 1996)

- 黃曉晴
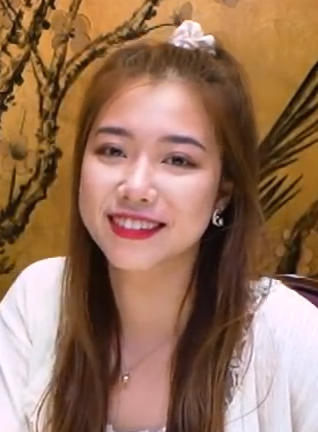
- Yelo in June 2021
- Pronunciation: Wong Hio Cheng
- Born: Vanessa Wong; April 17, 1996 (age 30); Macau
- Other names: Yelo, 野佬, 爐B, Yelo bb
- Education: Bachelor of Social Sciences in Communication from the University of Macau
- Occupations: Influencer, actress, street dancer, singer
- Years active: 2013–present
- Employer: Manner Culture (since 2013)

YouTube information
- Channel: Yelo黃曉晴
- Years active: 2010–present
- Subscribers: 77,800
- Views: 5,378,865

Vanessa Wong (Chinese: 黃曉晴; born 17 April 1996), known professionally as Yelo, is a Macanese street dancer, influencer and actress.

== Personal life ==
Vanessa Wong was born in Macau. Her family owns a family-run bakery. She currently lives in Hong Kong and is dating Eddy Hong.

== Manner culture ==
Vanessa Wong joined Manner Culture after being recommended by her senior Weng Chan (Chicken Wing). After meeting Lok Chi Hou (Sixty Cents), she was scheduled for an interview and received an invitation from Manner Culture on 23 September, later officially joining as one of its members. During her time under Manner Culture, Wang often played as on-screen couples with Carl Ao Ieong (Hou Dee). Wang served as the choreographer for Manner Culture's musical show "Maybe Funny" (Chinese: 可能好笑). She is also a scriptwriter and a director.

== Filmography ==
=== Television ===
All television credits are for roles on ViuTV.

Year	Title	Role	Notes
2021	Youngster Show Time	Herself	Guest for the 233rd episode
2022	Lucky Seven	Herself	Guest for the sixth episode
2022	Actor • Door	Herself	Guest for the twelfth episode
2022	Sound Battle	Herself	Guest for the first to fifth episodes
2022	Beast Fight Game	Herself	Guest for the 62nd episode

=== Music videos ===
Song	Year	Artist	Reference(s)
"Hunger for Love"	2020	Hacken Lee	
