= Companhia de Telecomunicações de Macau =

Telecommunications company in Macau

- Company type: Subsidiary
- Industry: Telecommunications; Mobile Communications
- Founded: 20 October 1981; 44 years ago
- Headquarters: Rua de Lagos, Telecentro, Taipa, Macau
- Area served: Macau
- Key people: Vandy Poon, CEO
- Products: Comprehensive telecom service
- Owner: CITIC Telecom International
- Website: www.ctm.net

Companhia de Telecomunicações de Macau

Chinese name
- Traditional Chinese: 澳門電訊有限公司
- Simplified Chinese: 澳门电讯有限公司
Transcriptions
Standard Mandarin
- Hanyu Pinyin: Àomén Diànxùn Yǒuxiàngōngsī
Yue: Cantonese
- Jyutping: ou3 mun4*2 din6 seon3 jau5 haan6 gung1 si1

Portuguese name
- Portuguese: Companhia de Telecomunicações de Macau S.A.R.L.

Companhia de Telecomunicações de Macau S.A.R.L. (Chinese: 澳門電訊有限公司), abbreviated as CTM, is a telecommunications company in Macau, which obtained a monopoly franchise license from the government except for mobile telephone services.

== History ==
Prior to 1981, telecommunications in Macau fell mainly under the purview of Macau Post and Telecommunications. Residents in Macau had to wait many months simply to have a telephone connected. To make a telephone call to Hong Kong was a lengthy procedure which had to be placed through an operator.

On 29 September 1981, an agreement was reached between the then Portuguese Macau government and the British telecommunications company Cable & Wireless plc to set up the new company Companhia de Telecomunicações de Macau S.A.R.L.. Shareholders included Marconi Comunicações Internacionais (the Portuguese operations of the UK-based Marconi Company, acquired by Portugal Telecom (now Altice Portugal) in 2002), CITIC Pacific (later transferred to subsidiary CITIC Telecom International in 2010) and Macau Post.

In June 2013, CITIC Telecom International’s transaction in acquiring the entire shareholding in CTM of both Cable and Wireless Communications and Portugal Telecom was officially approved by the Macau SAR Government. CITIC Telecom International became the controlling shareholder of CTM (99%) with the Macau Postal Savings as the remaining shareholder(1%).

== See also ==
- Telecommunications in Macau
