= Macau.com =

Travel and holiday companies of China

- Type: Private company
- Industry: Travel Solutions; Ticketing Solutions; Online Commerce
- Founded: 2006
- Headquarters: Macau SAR, China
- Revenue: Not disclosed
- Net income: Not disclosed
- Website: www.macau.com

Macau.com is a destination marketing and travel company based in Macau, China that focuses on information and trip planning tools for visitors coming to Macau. The company markets accommodation, shows, restaurants, entertainment and attractions in Macau and the Pearl River Delta region. It concentrates its business on the inbound market, primarily coming from Hong Kong, Taiwan, Japan, South Korea, Australia and Southeast Asia.

The company was established in 2006 with GoMacau.com as its brand. In June 2007, GoMacau.com relaunched as Macau.com. This acquisition significantly extends GoMacau.com's consumer reach and helps complement two brands together. Macau.com is a web portal and online travel agency for hotel accommodation, shows tickets and packaged tour products. The company is a member of Ignite Media Group, a Macau-based media conglomerate.

Macau.com is officially registered as Macau 24 Hours Travel Agency Limited.

== Events ==
Macau.com signed a strategic partnership with Viva Macau airlines in December 2006 whereby the two companies committed to jointly promote Macau as a travel destination. In addition, Macau.com and Macau Fisherman's Wharf launched partnership for future co-operation in Macau's event market in November 2007.

In March 2012, Macau.com announced a partnership with Expedia Affiliate Network to give Macau.com users access to over 149,000 hotels worldwide.

In November 2012, Macau.com relaunched a revamped website featuring new sections such as Hotels, Thing to Do, Casinos, Calendar and Spas.
