= O'Che 1867 =

- Type: Private
- Industry: Fine Jewelry
- Founded: 1867
- Headquarters: Macau, China
- Key people: Stephen Tse (Executive Director)
- Website: www.OChe1867.com

O'Che 1867 is a high jewellery sub-brand of Ourivesaria Che Lee Yuen (Chinese: 謝利源), a family-owned goldsmith and jewellery business in Macau, China which was founded in 1867 during the reign of the Tongzhi Emperor in the Qing dynasty. It is one of the oldest goldsmiths and jewellery businesses in the Greater China region with the family's history in the business spans four generations. The word "Ourivesaria" is Portuguese for goldsmiths and "Che" ("Tse" in Hong Kong) is the romanized form of the family's Chinese surname.

== History ==
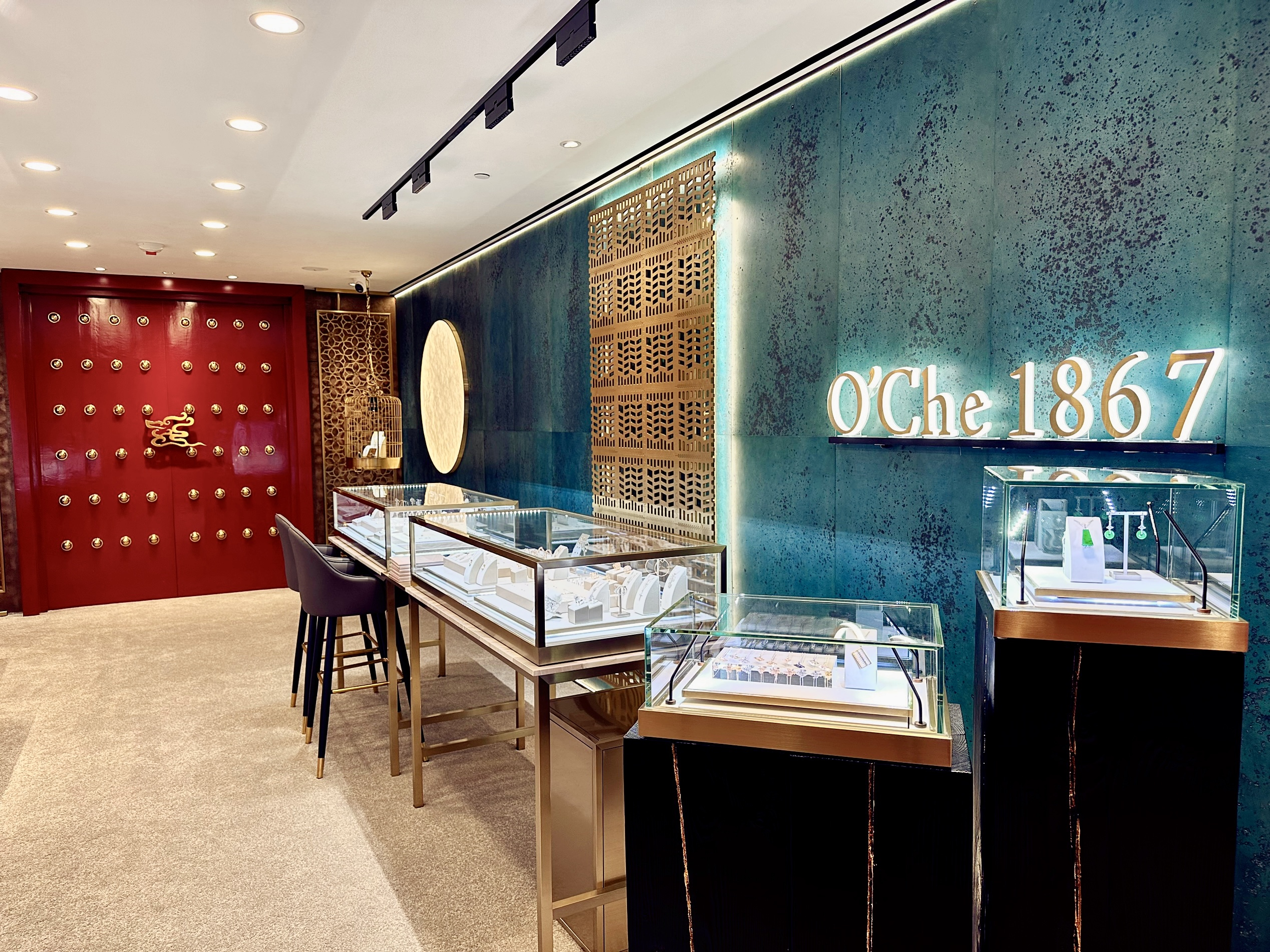

- 1850: Founder, Mr Che Yue Tong was born in Macau
- 1867: At the age of 17, Mr Che set up "Ourivesaria Che Lee Yuen" in Kiu Tsai Tou, Macau.
- 1880: Began making gold jewelry
- 1910-20: Two sons, Choi Sang and Wing Sang joined the business, shop moved to No. 24 Rua dos Mercadores.
- 1942: The third generation, Chi San (son of Choi Sang) joined the company.
- 1944-46: First in the Greater China region to use electrolysis to refine gold in commercial scale and first to use carbon for dissolving platinum.
- 1967: 100th Anniversary of the Company
- 1992: Business expanded and shop moved to the present address at Rua F.X. Pereira 105A.
- 1996: Chi San's second son, Stephen Tse, the 4th generation joined the business.
- 1997: The Company's sub-brand - RingMaster, a new concept jewelry store was created and opened, the first of its kind in Macau.
- 2007: 140th Anniversary of the Company. A new concept store was established specializing in high jewelry.
- 2008: The Brand exhibited for the first time at an international jewellery event, the "JMA Macau 2008"
- 2008: Received the Macau Prime Award for Brand Excellence
- 2017: The Brand received the Most Valuable Brand Gold Award (Business Awards of Macau 2017)
- 2018: First China Store opened in Zhuhai, PRC.
- 2019: The Company was appointed to create the crown for Miss Macau Pageant 2019 and became the official sponsor and manufacturer of the crowns for the event.
- 2019: The Brand was officially recognized as one of the 12 Macao Classic Brands (Marca Tipica de Macau)
- 2020: Authorised IP Partner for the 600th Anniversary of the Forbidden City, Beijing
- 2023: A High Jewellery Store with Cultural Concept opened at the MGM Hotel Macau
- 2024: The Brand received the Macau SMEs Honourbale Awards
- 2025: Jewellery Art & Design Award, Florence Biennale, Italy
- 2026: The Brand was officially recongnized as one of the Macau Century-Old Brand (Marca Centenaria) and received the Excellence Award in <My City - My Brand> of Business Awards of Macau
- 2026: Invited by the DSEDT of the Macao SAR Government to participate in the 12th Bonjour Brand Forum in Paris, and to present the brand and launch the latest collection at the UNESCO headquarters.

== See also ==
- List of companies of Macau
