= Lai Minhua =

Macanese police officer

- 賴敏華
- Born: January 1959; Macau
- Died: October 30, 2015 (aged 56); Taipa
- Cause of death: Official verdict of suicide
- Education: Sun Yat-sen University
- Occupation: Director General of Macao Customs Service
- Employer: Macau Public Security Police Force

Lai Minhua (Chinese: 賴敏華; pinyin: Lài Mǐnhuá; January 1959 – 30 October 2015) was a police officer from Macau, who was Director General of Macau Customs Service. According to official sources, she died by suicide in 2015; however, doubt has been cast over this verdict.

== Early life and education ==
Lai was born in January 1959 in Macau, but her family originate from Guangdong. She graduated from Macau Security Force Higher School with a BA in police science and went on study for a MA in Public Administration from Sun Yat-sen University.

== Career ==
Lai joined the Macau Public Security Police Force in April 1984. She moved to the Marine Police Inspection Team the following year as a second-class officer. In June 1986, she was promoted to Deputy Sheriff; in October 1990, she was promoted to Sheriff. She was appointed Deputy Superintendent of Police in January 1995, and then rose to the position of Chief Police Officer. In March 1999, she was appointed deputy director of the Marine Police Inspection Bureau and deputy director of Customs. At the time of her death, she was Director General of the Macao Customs Service.

== Death ==
On 30 October 2015, she was found dead in a public toilet next to a private housing estate in Taipa. According to the police, Lai had taken sleeping pills and had cuts on her right neck and wrists; in addition, a plastic bag had been placed on her head. The wounds on her body were consistent with self-infliction, but the utility knife apparently used was found neatly stored in the deceased's handbag.

Initially the possibility of suicide was ruled out, as no suicide note was found at the scene, and she was scheduled to go to Zhuhai that day to discuss anti-smuggling work with the local police. Later, the Judiciary Police ruled out the possibility of murder, so she was suspected of committing suicide. However, according to the Macau Commission Against Corruption, Lai was not the target of a commission investigation, and there was no known reason for suicide.

On the day the news of Lai's death was posted, some netizens questioned the veracity of the claim of suicide, and citing whether the deceased could cut other parts of the body and use a plastic bag to cover their head, whilst under the influence of drugs, with multiple wounds. Hong Kong cartoonist Bai Shui expressed this question in cartoons in his satirical comic work "Warm Shui Theater".

== Legacy ==
According to official sources, Lai was the first senior official to commit suicide in office since Macau was handed over to the People's Republic of China in 1999. Her death, and its subsequent reporting, has been used as a case study on media use in Macau and in particular how mainstream media was reluctant to report on her death.
