= Jet Asia =

Macau-based airline

- Commenced operations: 1995; 31 years ago
- Operating bases: Macau International Airport
- Fleet size: 1
- Headquarters: Macau, China
- Website: www.jetasia.com

Jet Asia is a private jet operator based in Macau, China. The company is described as an air limousine service. Jet Asia is not to be confused with Hong Kong–based private jet company, "Asia Jet".

Established in 1995, Jet Asia operates a wide range of small business jets. Jet Asia no longer has an AOC and is moving away from the aircraft management business.

== Fleet ==
=== Current fleet ===
The Jet Asia fleet consists of the following aircraft (as of August 2017):

Jet Asia fleet
Aircraft	In Service	Orders	Passengers	Notes
Challenger 605	1	—		
Total	1			

=== Former Fleet ===
The airline previously operated the following aircraft:

- 1 Bombardier Global Express
- 1 Bombardier Challenger 605
- 6 Hawkers
- 2 Bombardier Challenger 601

== See also ==
- List of companies of Macau
