= CITIC Telecom International =

Telecommunication vendor

CITIC Telecom International Holdings Limited 中信国际电讯集团有限公司
- Company type: Public Company
- Traded as: SEHK: 1883
- Industry: Telecom
- Founded: 1999
- Headquarters: Hong Kong
- Area served: Hong Kong, Macau
- Key people: Chairman: Mr. Xin Yue Jiang (2009- )
- Parent: CITIC Pacific
- Subsidiaries: CITIC Telecom CPC; CTM
- Website: www.citictel.com

CITIC Telecom International Holdings Limited is a telecommunication vendor to provide telecom services in the Asia Pacific including voice service, mobile SMS and other value-added services, data service and telecom solutions to telecom operators and ISP.

It was established in Hong Kong in 1999 and was listed on the Hong Kong Stock Exchange on 3 April 2007 with stock code 1883. It is parented by CITIC Pacific, a Hong Kong–based conglomerate company, since 2000.

The group's services cover international telecommunications services (including mobile, Internet, voice, data services), integrated telecoms services (in Macau), and through its wholly owned subsidiary, CITIC Telecom International CPC Limited (“CPC”), has established numerous PoPs around the world (especially in the Asia-Pacific region) to provide data and telecoms services (including VPN, Cloud, network security, co-location, Internet access, etc.) to multinational corporations. The Group holds 99% equity interest in Companhia de Telecomunicações de Macau, S.A.R.L. (“CTM”).

Pacific Internet was purchased by Citic Telecom International Holdings Limited on 12 October 2016. Pacific Internet serves the Southeast Asia market, mainly Singapore, Indonesia, Malaysia and Thailand.

== See also ==
- Pacific Internet
- Internet in Singapore
