= Yuki Ip (model) =

Macanese model (born 1995)

Yuki Ip 葉思男
- Born: Ip Si Nam; October 1, 1996 (age 29); Macau
- Education: Macao University of Tourism
- Years active: 2019–present
- Employer: Manner Culture (2019–2023)
- Father: Ip Kam Tim
- Relatives: Isabelle Yip (sister)

Yuki Ip (Portuguese: Ip Si Nam; Chinese: 葉思男; born 1 October 1995), known as Sinam (思男) and often referred to as Younger Sister (阿妹), is a Macanese model, YouTuber, and was a member of Manner Culture alongside her sister Isabelle Ip. Ip began her career under Manner Culture with their support. However, when her former manager Jane Lao committed suicide, her activities and statements were criticised, and she was condemned by the public as one of Lao's bullies who had hurt her. Later, she left Manner Culture when her contract ended.

== Personal life ==
In 2021, Ip publicly announced that she was in a relationship with fellow entertainer Choi Pou Man (BigMan). In July 2022, netizens discovered that BigMan was travelling together in Hong Kong with another woman and acting intimately. Cheating suspicions began arising, and BigMan later announced his withdrawal from Manner Culture's on-screen work on the afternoon of 10 July. Ip later defended BigMan, stating that their relationship had regressed from being good friends back to being friends, subtly admitting that they had split up. In February 2023, Brandon Wang announced on Instagram that he was in a relationship with Ip.

== Controversy ==
On 26 July 2023, Manner Culture's former manager Jane Lao committed suicide. Because Ip once added a photo with a crying face filter on Instagram, she was accused of bullying Lao. On 27 July, Ip denied bullying Lao on Instagram, expressing that she did not know that Lao was depressed because of this. She also stated that she was purely following the trend and had no intent of ridiculing Lao. On 2 September, Ip apologised to Ip on Instagram again, admitting that starting a livestream that day was overly implusive and that she ultimately chose to avoid talking about it. She also expressed her worry of being rebuked by the public and that she announced that she officially ended her contract with Manner Culture.

== Filmography ==
=== Television (ViuTV) ===
| Year | Title | Role | Notes |
|---|---|---|---|
| 2020 | Home Field Goal | Herself (host) | |
| 2021 | Youngster Show Time | Herself | Guest for the 233rd episode |
| 2022 | Lucky Seven | Herself | Guest for the sixth episode |
| 2022 | Talker / Night Talk | Herself | Guest for the 89th episode |
| 2022 | Know Your Ingredients | Herself | Guest for the 171st episode |
| 2022 | Yummy Family | Herself (butler for a participating family) | |
