= Macau Daily Times =

Daily newspaper in Macau

- The Macau Daily Times front page on 4 April 2008.
- Founder: Kowie Geldenhuys
- Editor-in-chief: Paulo Coutinho
- Managing editor: Lynzy Valles
- Founded: 1 June 2007
- Language: English
- Headquarters: Avenida da Praia Grande No. 599, Edificio Comercial Rodrigues, 12 Floor C Macau
- Website: macaudailytimes.com.mo

Macau Daily Times
- Traditional Chinese: 澳門每日時報
- Simplified Chinese: 澳门每日时报
Transcriptions
Standard Mandarin
- Hanyu Pinyin: Àomén Měirì Shíbào
Yue: Cantonese
- Jyutping: ou3 mun4*2 mui5 jat6 si4 bou3

The Macau Daily Times (Chinese: 澳門每日時報) is a daily English-language newspapers published in Macau, launched on 1 June 2007.

== Overview ==
The paper started life among one English and several Chinese and Portuguese language newspapers. It consists of between 20 and 36 pages. Currently more than 30 journalists and contributors are working with the paper which includes a director, managing editor, contributing editors, reporters and designers.

The newspaper, like all press in Macau (and Hong Kong), are protected by the Basic Law and Press Law, which upholds the freedom of the press in the enclave and restricting government regulation of the media. Journalists can protect their sources of information. An editorial on the website claims that the paper "is an independent and unbiased newspaper that voices every side's opinion'.

Since March 1, 2012, Paulo Coutinho, a journalist with a career over 25 years in television, magazines and newspapers, is the director and editor-in-chief. Kowie Geldenhuys is the founder and administrator of the Macau Daily Times.

From May 2025, the newspaper began to have a fully colored edition.

== See also ==
- Media of Macau
- Macau Post Daily, another English-language daily newspaper in Macau
