= Exmoo News =

- Format: Broadsheet
- Founded: September 2, 2011
- Political alignment: Pro-establishment
- Headquarters: Macau
- Website: www.exmoo.com

Exmoo News (Chinese: 力報), formerly called Exmoo News Weekly, simply known as Exmoo, is a Chinese free newspaper published daily in Macau, established on September 2, 2011.

Published in Chinese, Exmoo News is often regarded as a pro-establishment newspaper. It is produced and published by the Central International Communication Company Limited.
