= Hoje Macau =

Portuguese-language newspaper in Macau

- Type: Daily newspaper
- Founded: 2 July 1990
- Language: Portuguese-language
- Headquarters: Macau
- Website: hojemacau.com.mo

Hoje Macau (Today Macau; Chinese: 今日澳門), formerly called Macau Hoje, is a Portuguese-language newspaper published daily in Macau, established on 2 July 1990.

Hoje Macau is one of the few Portuguese-language newspapers left in Macau.
