= CITIC Telecom CPC =

Hong Kong technology company

CITIC Telecom International CPC Limited
- Native name: 中信國際電訊(信息技術)有限公司
- Industry: ICT solutions including: Private Network; Cloud computing; Information Security; Cloud Datacenter
- Founded: 2001
- Headquarters: Hong Kong
- Area served: Worldwide
- Key people: Frank Cai (CEO, CITIC Telecom & Vice Chairman, CITIC Telecom CPC); Esmond Li (CFO, CITIC Telecom & CEO, CITIC Telecom CPC)
- Parent: CITIC Telecom International Holdings Limited
- Subsidiaries: China Enterprise ICT Solutions Limited
- Website: www.citictel-cpc.com

CITIC Telecom International CPC Limited, formerly known as PSINet HK and CPCNet, is a wholly owned subsidiary of CITIC Telecom International Holdings Limited (SEHK: 1883), and is a technological company involved in managed cloud computing, IP networking, information security, and data center services.

The company owns and operates computing, security and networking facilities, communications linkages, and in-country local sales offices.

In 2016, CITIC Telecom CPC acquired Linx Telecommunication B.V. (Linx Telecommunications)

== History ==
In 2011, CPCNet was renamed CITIC Telecom International CPC Limited (CITIC Telecom CPC)

2016 saw, CITIC Telecom CPC commence acquiring Linx Telecommunications. Linx Telecommunication B.V. was renamed and merged into the company as CITIC Telecom CPC Europe.

In 2017, CITIC Telecom CPC also became the first IaaS Provider to receive a new cloud-centric ISO27017 certification in Hong Kong.

== Parent and subsidiary ==
Parent company, CITIC Telecom International Holdings Limited (HKSE 1883), is an ICT service provider in Asia Pacific. Subsidiary company China Enterprise ICT Solutions Limited ("China Entercom" or "CEC") was founded in 2000, and is an Information and Communications Technology (ICT) service provider in China.
