= List of radio stations in Macau =

This is a list of radio stations in Macau.

- Rádio Macau (Chinese: 澳門電台)
  - Rádio Macau in Cantonese (Chinese: 澳門電台中文頻道) (FM 100.7 MHz)
  - Rádio Macau in Portuguese (Chinese: 澳門電台葡文頻道) (FM 98.0 MHz)
- Radio Vilaverde Lda (Chinese: 綠村電台)
  - FM 99.5 (Chinese: 綠村電台) (FM 99.5 MHz)

== See also ==
- Media in Macau
- List of radio stations in Hong Kong
