= Tai Chung Pou =

Portuguese-language newspaper in Macau

- Type: Daily newspaper
- Founded: 15 July 1933
- Language: Cantonese
- Headquarters: Macau
- Website: taichungdaily.mo

Tai Chung Pou (大衆報) is a Macanese newspaper, the oldest in circulation, first published in 1933.

== History ==
The first edition was published on 15 July 1933, however it was suspended in 1942 during Japanese occupation, returning only in 1948.

Tai Chung Pou reported the Carnation Revolution days after it happened in Portugal. It reported the arrival of MFA officials on 6 May 1974, who gave a dispatch of the events that happened in Portugal on 25 April.

In 2007, Tai Chung Pou released a Portuguese supplement. Between the summer of 2007 and early 2008, the supplement published 100 classes related to Chinese characters.
