= Macau Post Daily =

The Macau Post Daily
- "Your trustworthy source of news & views"
- Type: Daily newspaper
- Format: Compact Newspaper
- Owner: Macau Cultural Box Ltd
- Editor-in-chief: Harald Brüning
- Founded: 2004
- Headquarters: 39 Rua dos Mercadores, Centro Comercial Ou Chong, 5D, Macau
- Country: Macau, China
- Circulation: 5,000 daily on weekdays
- ISSN: 1813-2898
- Website: www.macaupostdaily.com

Macau Post Daily
- Traditional Chinese: 澳門郵報
- Simplified Chinese: 澳门邮报
Transcriptions
Standard Mandarin
- Hanyu Pinyin: Àomén Yóubào
Yue: Cantonese
- Jyutping: ou3 mun4*2 jau4 bou3

The Macau Post Daily (Chinese: 澳門郵報) (sometimes abbreviated to MPD) was launched on August 27, 2004, and is Macau's oldest and highest paid-circulation English-language daily newspaper.

== See also ==
- Media of Macau
