= Viva Macau =

Airline based at Macau International Airport

VIVA Macau Airlines
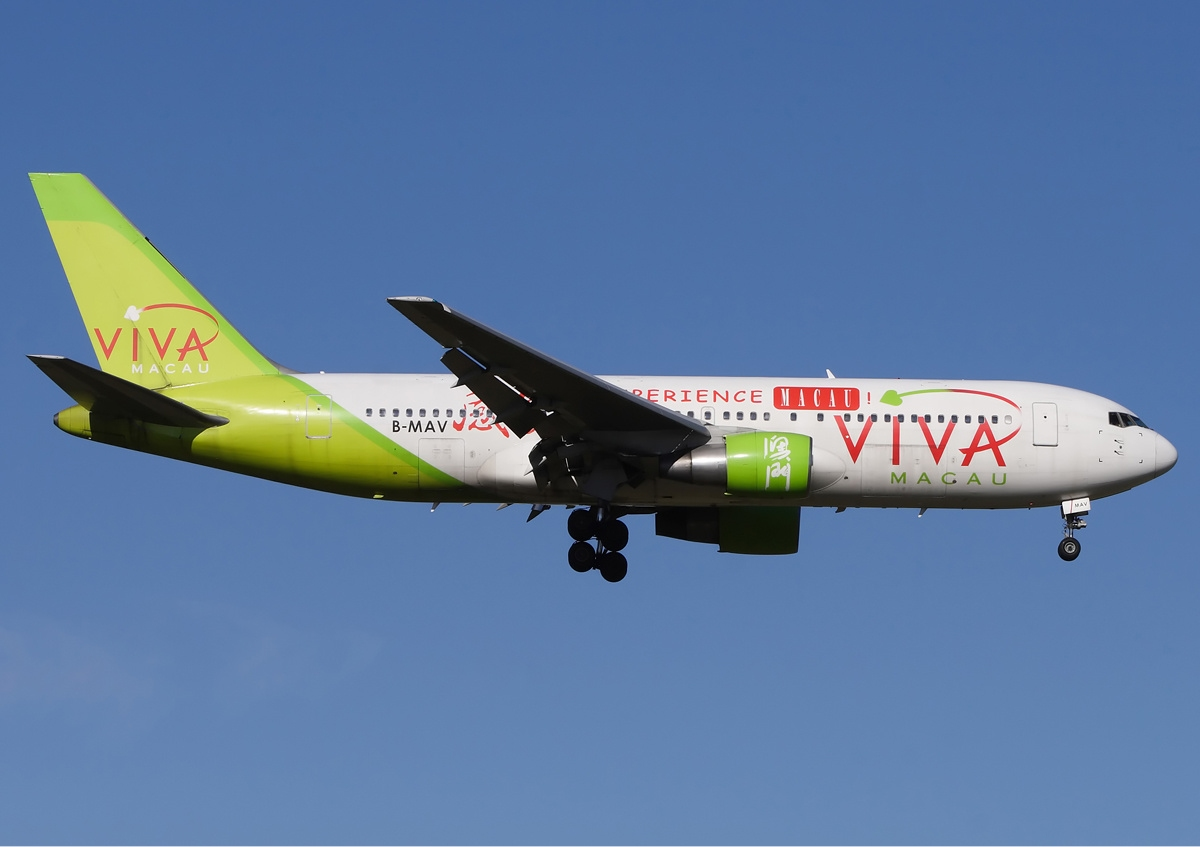
IATA	ICAO	Call sign
ZG	VVM	JACKPOT
- Founded: 2005
- Ceased operations: 28 March 2010
- Operating bases: Macau International Airport
- Fleet size: 3
- Destinations: 7
- Parent company: Macau Eagle Aviation Services Ltd.
- Headquarters: Macau
- Key people: Ngan In Leng (Chairman); Reg Macdonald (CEO)

Viva Macau Airlines was a Macanese long-haul, low-cost carrier based at Macau International Airport. The airline operated flights to Australia and Asia.

In March 2010, Viva Macau was forced to suspend operations after the Macau government suddenly ordered Air Macau to cancel its sub-concession agreement with Viva Macau, alleging that Viva Macau failed to adequately assist passengers affected by flight delays and cancellations. The government then quickly revoked Viva Macau's Air Operator's Certificate saying that without a sub-concession, the airline was not compliant with the requirements for public air transport services. The action is currently under appeal in the Macau courts and has raised questions for foreign investors regarding Macau's regulatory environment.

== History ==
In 1994, the Macau Government attracted a consortium of investors to start Air Macau with the promise of a 25-year monopoly concession. The carrier set up as a connecting airline for flights between China and Taiwan primarily as well as other Southeast Asian countries.

Under a sub-concession arrangement with Air Macau, Viva Macau launched new routes from Macau in 2006, pioneering the concept of LCC-type low-cost, long-haul services. Despite Air Macau holding the exclusive concession on all air routes out of Macau, after lengthy negotiations, the government agreed to license the new airline on the condition that any routes Viva Macau wanted to operate had first to be approved by Air Macau.

In the years that followed, Viva expanded service with new routes from Macau to Indonesia, Vietnam, Japan and Australia. Viva Macau was named the "New Airline of the Year" in November 2007 by the Centre for Asia Pacific Aviation, due in part to its contribution to the development of the aviation industry and tourism in Macau and across Asia.

In September 2009, Viva Macau was voted in the "Top 10 Budget Airlines" by the readers of SmartTravelAsia.com for the second consecutive year. Also in September 2009, Viva Macau become the first Macau-based airline to receive certification from the Macau Civil Aviation Authority (AACM) for Extended Twin Engine Operations (ETOPS). ETOPS is the global standard for efficient long-distance flight operations.

Due to Macau's limited workforce, the company employed staff from 28 different countries as well as local labor.

== Demise ==
After the 2008 financial crisis, the company struggled financially and the Macau SAR government provided financial support to the airline. During 2008–2009, the Macau SAR government lent Viva Macau MOP200 million to help improve the airline's sustainability after taking similar action to rescue Air Macau.

On 28 March 2010, the Civil Aviation Authority of Macau ordered Air Macau to cancel its sub-concession agreement with Viva Macau, alleging that Viva Macau failed to adequately assist passengers affected by flight delays and cancellations. The government then quickly revoked Viva Macau's Air Operator's Certificate saying that without a sub-concession, the airline was not compliant with the requirements for public air transport services. The action is currently under appeal in the Macau courts and has raised questions for foreign investors regarding Macau's regulatory environment. The Macau SAR government provided assistance to passengers who were stranded because of the suspension of Viva Macau's operations. Viva Macau did plan to resume operations on the 2 April but those plans fell through.

== Viva Macau Appeal ==
In April 2010 Viva commenced an administrative appeal in Macau's courts against the revocation of its license by the Macau government. The appeal was initially rejected by the Macau courts, claiming no involvement by the government. Members of US Congress and US State Department called attention to the case, noting that it involved the expropriation of the US investors in Viva Macau. In February 2011, the Macau supreme court overturned earlier rejections, allowing the administrative appeal to proceed and requiring public hearings for the Viva Macau case. According to the Macau court registry website the Viva Macau hearings were scheduled for May/June 2012.

The Viva Macau case comes at a time of increasing questions about the rule of law in Macau. In October 2011, the chairman of the local supreme court publicly criticized the Macau government, citing poor decision making in many administrative procedures "resulting from lack of knowledge about the laws and regulations." The head of the Macau Legal Association cited concerns about bias in the Macau courts in favor of the local government in administrative appeal cases. And, the US Consul General for Hong Kong and Macau publicly highlighted the need for an equitable environment for US businesses, with a transparent rule of law guaranteeing investor rights.

Hearings began on May 31, 2012, focusing on the actions of Macau's Secretary for Transport and Public Works, Lau Si Io, who acted with disregard for established official procedures. Viva Macau's former director of engineering, Yok Cheow Lee, is quoted as saying that in his 40 years in the aviation industry he had not "come across any airline being terminated suddenly without a warning and a period of time to justify [why it was having problems]." Air Macau stated during the first hearing that it had to terminate the sub-concession contract due to government pressure.

Meanwhile, Macau's aviation sector continues to lag after the termination of Viva Macau. In November 2011 Air Macau received an additional US$90 million injection from the Macau government; instead of expanding routes it purchased a fleet of Mercedes Benz limousines. Due to a lack of operating airlines at Macau Airport, the government was forced to bail out the Macau Airport with a US$240 million injection in spring 2012.

== Partnership with Air Macau ==
The de facto national carrier of Macau, Air Macau, had concluded a licensing agreement that allowed Viva Macau to operate (since Air Macau owns the air-traffic rights to destinations that Viva Macau intended to fly to). In addition, Viva Macau was negotiating further co-operation with Air Macau in the form of joint marketing or codesharing. The two airlines were not expected to compete with each other while Air Macau continued to concentrate on short-haul full-service routes, especially domestic flights to People's Republic of China and Republic of China.

== Destinations ==
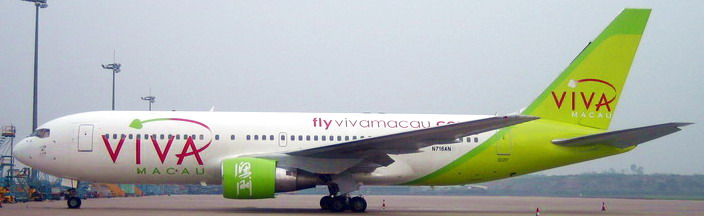
Viva Macau Boeing 767-200ER (B-MAV).

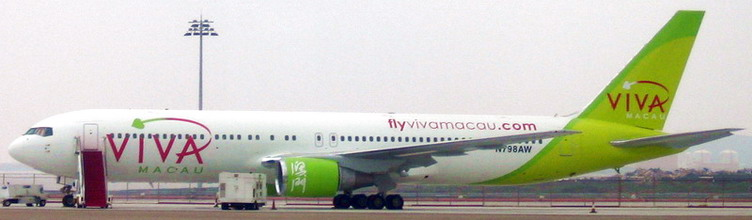
A Viva Macau Boeing 767-300ER (B-MAW).

In its short history, Viva Macau had changed its destinations depending on consumer demand. The airline also operated a number of charter flights to Japan, including Tokyo. It was likely that their routes would have been expanded in the future (including the possibility of scheduled service to Tokyo via Ibaraki Airport).

== Fleet ==
Viva Macau operated the following Boeing aircraft (at 28 March 2010):

Viva Macau Fleet
Aircraft	In Fleet	Passengers
Boeing 767-200ER	1	210
Boeing 767-300ER	2	245

The acquisition of more aircraft was planned, building up to a fleet of 10-15 aircraft within five years.

== Onboard ==
Viva Macau operated a two-class service – Economy Class and Premium Class. Checked luggage is not included in the ticket price for Economy passengers – they may purchase up to 15 kilograms (33 lb) of luggage allowance on check-in. Economy offers 32 inches (81 cm) of seat pitch and buy-on-board meal service. Premium passengers receive 55 inches (140 cm) of seat pitch and free meals as well as 30 kilograms (66 lb) of checked luggage included in the ticket price.

== See also ==
- Transport in Macau
- Macau International Airport
- AirAsia X
