= Macao Daily News =

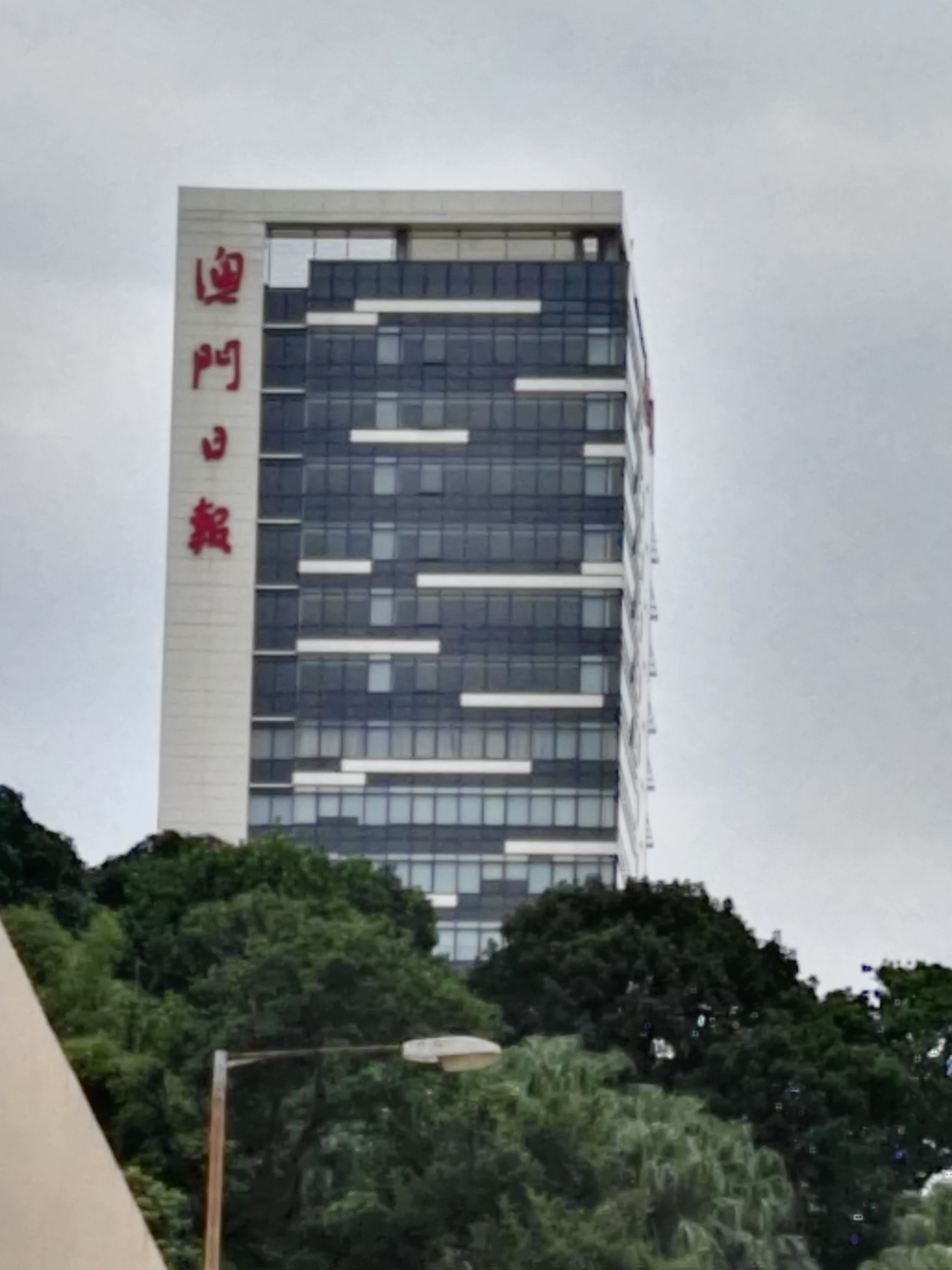
- Macao Daily News Building
- Traditional Chinese: 澳門日報
- Simplified Chinese: 澳门日报
Transcriptions
Standard Mandarin
- Hanyu Pinyin: Aòmén Rìbào
Yue: Cantonese
- Jyutping: ou3 mun4*2 jat6 bou3

The Macao Daily News (Chinese: 澳門日報, Portuguese: Diário de Macau), established on 15 August 1958, is a daily newspaper published in Macau with the backing of the Chinese Communist Party. It was launched on August 15, 1958, and is now the largest newspaper in Macau, accounting for 70% to 80% of the city's newspaper circulation. It is one of two popular Chinese language dailies.

== See also ==
- Media of Macau
