= List of political parties in Macau =

Macau does not have formal political parties. However, some civic groups representing the interests of business, labor, and social welfare put forward lists at the elections. The following is a listing of associations that participated in the most recent legislative elections:

== Represented in the Legislative Assembly ==
Party	Abbr.	Leader	Camp	Political position	Ideology	Assembly seats
Macau United Citizens Association	ACUM	Shi Jiarun	Pro-Beijing	Centre-right to right-wing	Conservatism; Economic liberalism; Chinese nationalism	3 / 33
New Hope	NE	José Pereira Coutinho	Pro-democracy	Centre to centre-left	Liberalism; Social liberalism	3 / 33
Macau Federation of Trade Unions	FAOM	Leong Iok Wa	Pro-Beijing	Left-wing	Socialism; Chinese nationalism	2 / 33
Macau-Guangdong Union	UMG	Mak Soi Kun	Pro-Beijing	Centre-right to right-wing	Conservatism; Laissez-faire	2 / 33
General Union of Neighbourhood Associations of Macau	GUNA	Ng Siu Lai	Pro-Beijing	Left-wing		2 / 33
Women's General Association of Macau	AGMM	Wong Kit Cheng	Pro-Beijing	Left-wing	Feminism	2 / 33

== Other parties ==
- Por Macau
- Alliance for Change
- New Union for Macau's Development
- Macau Business Interest Union (OMKC, also known as Macau union of employer's interests)
- Employees Association Joint Candidature Commission (CCCAE)
- Macau professional Interest Union (OMCY)
- Association for Promotion of Social Services and Education
- Excellent Culture and Sports Union Association
- New Macau Association
  - New Democratic Macau Association
  - Prosperous Democratic Macau Association
  - New Macau Liberals
- Civil Watch (Civico)
- Association for Together Efforts to Improve the Community (MAC)
- Activism for Democracy Association
- Democratic Society Alliance
- Association for Promotion of Civic Rights (APDC)
- Macau Ideals
- Innovative Action
- Supervision by the Lower Class
- Workers' Movement Front (MO)

== Defunct associations ==
- Plural Voices – Peoples of Macau
- Association for Democracy and Social Well-Being of Macau
- Vision Macau
- Convergence for Development
- New Youth of Macau
- General Union for the Good of Macau
- Association for Promoting the Economy of Macau
- Employees and Wage-Earners Association
- General Union for Development of Macau

== See also ==
- Politics of Macau (pro-Beijing camp and pro-democracy camp)
- List of political parties by country
- List of political parties in the Republic of China after 1949
- List of political parties in mainland China
- List of political parties in Hong Kong
