= Elections in Macau =

Macau elects at the regional level its head of government and legislature. The Legislative Assembly is made up of 33 members, of whom 14 are elected by popular vote under proportional representation, 12 elected from functional constituencies and 7 appointed by the Chief Executive. The Chief Executive of Macau is returned by a 400-member Election Committee on five-year intervals.

== Voter registration and candidacy ==
Natural persons can register as an elector of direct suffrage to the Legislative Assembly if they:

- have reached 18 years of age;
- are permanent resident of Macau; and
- are not declared by Courts as incompetent persons, deprived of political rights or manifestly insane.

Legal persons can nominate at most 22 electors with natural person suffrage to exercise the collective's voting rights for indirect suffrage to the Legislative Assembly and the Election Committee if they:

- are confirmed to be operating within the specified sector for at least 4 years;
- have obtained legal personality for at least 7 years; and
- for the Election Committee elections, are not in office as the Chief Executive, Principal Officials, Judicial Magistrates, Public Ministers and Members of the Election Management Committee.

Natural persons registered as electors can run for elections of direct suffrage and indirect suffrage in the sector they belong to. Electors can also run for the Election Committee if they are not in office as the Chief Executive, Principal Officials, Judicial Magistrates, Public Ministers and Members of the Election Management Committee.

== Legislative Assembly elections ==
Elections were held to return members of the Legislative Assembly since 1976. Members returned from direct suffrage and indirect suffrage have been elected with seats apportioned with a peculiar highest averages method. While D'Hondt uses 1,2,3,4,... as divisors, Macau instead uses 1,2,4,8,... as divisors Their method disadvantages large parties, which is highly unusual among electoral systems. Suffrage was opened to Macau Residents without Portuguese citizenship in 1984.

Compositions of elected seats in the Legislative Assembly are as follows:

	1976	1980	1984	1988	1992	1996	2001	2005	2009	2013	2017	2021
Direct Suffrage	6				8		10	12		14		
Indirect Suffrage	6				8		10			12		
Total number of elected seats	12				16		20	22		26		
Total seats	17		19	17	23		27	29		33		

== Chief Executive elections ==
Candidates of the Chief Executive are required to be nominated by at least 50 members of the Election Committee, before he is returned by the Election Committee with an absolute majority. The compositions of electoral colleges returning the Chief Executive are as follows:

	1999	2004	2009	2014	2019	2024
Electoral; College	Selection Committee for Forming the 1st Government of the Macau SAR	Election Committee				
Size of electorate	200	300		400		

Composition of the Election Committee (2013-)
Sector	Seats	Number of Electors (Note: in the 2019 Chief Executive Election.)
First Sector
Industrial, Commercial and Financial	120	977
Second Sector
Cultural	26	611
Educational	29	279
Professional	43	695
Sports	17	639
Second Sector total	115	2,224
Third Sector
Labour	59	1,072
Social Services	50	1,462
Religious	6	Consultation among religious organisations
Third Sector total	115	2,534
Fourth Sector
Representatives of Members of the Legislative Assembly	22	Elected according to rules made by the Legislative Assembly
Macau Deputies to the National People's Congress	12	Ex officio
Representatives of Macau Members of the CPPCC National Committee	14	Elected according to rules made by Members
Representatives of Members of Municipal Organisations	2	Elected according to rules made by Municipal Organisations
Fourth Sector total	50	

== See also ==
- Electoral calendar
- Electoral system
