= Women's General Association of Macau =

Political party in Macau

- Chinese name: 澳門婦女聯合總會
- Portuguese name: Associação Geral das Mulheres de Macau
- President: 劉金玲
- Chairman: 袁小菱
- Founded: 1950
- Registered: 22 November 1980
- Headquarters: 202 Rua do Campo, Macau
- Newspaper: Macau Women
- Membership (2021): 40,000+
- Ideology: Feminism
- Political position: Left-wing
- Regional affiliation: Pro-Beijing
- Colors: Pink
- Legislative Assembly: 2 / 33

Website
- www.macauwomen.org.mo

The Women's General Association of Macau (Chinese: 澳門婦女聯合總會; Portuguese: Associação Geral das Mulheres de Macau), often shortened to the Women's Association (婦聯), is a pro-Beijing political party in Macau. It has two seats in the Legislative Assembly.

== History ==
The Women's General Association of Macau was formed in 1950. It advocated the unity of "patriotic women" in Macau, connected women with different social backgrounds, and protecting women's rights. The association has positioned itself in the pro-Beijing camp, and is regarded as one of the camp's traditional groups.

The association formed an electoral alliance with other pro-Beijing parties in the 1992 legislative election, under the name "Progress Promotion Union". The association separated from the alliance in 2017 and ran as Alliance for a Happy Home (美好家園聯盟, Aliança do Bom Lar). The association returned to parliament with two members in 2021, its best result since the split.

== Leadership ==
The leadership of the 37th Council and Supervisory Board members:

- Leader: (劉金玲)
- Chairperson: (袁小菱)
- Secretary-general: (庄玲玲)

== Electoral performance ==
Election	Number of popular votes	% of popular votes	GC seats	FC seats	EC seats	Total seats	+/−
1992	UPP ticket		2	0	0	2 / 23	—
1996	UPP ticket		2	0	0	2 / 23	0
2001	UPP ticket		2	0	0	2 / 27	0
2005	UPP ticket		2	0	0	2 / 29	0
2009	UPP ticket		1	0	0	1 / 29	1▼
2013	UPP ticket		2	0	0	2 / 33	1▲
2017	9,496	5.50	1	0	0	1 / 33	1▼
2021	14,232▲	10.78▲	2	0	0	2 / 33	1▲

== Elected members ==
Members elected under UGAMM ticket are not shown.

- Wong Kit-cheng, 2017 – incumbent
- Ma Io-fong, 2021 – incumbent
