= 1996 Macanese legislative election =

- 3 October 1996
- Eight of the 23 seats in the Legislative Assembly
- Turnout: 64.49%
Party	Leader	Vote %	Seats	+/–
APPEM	Chan Kai-kit	16.59	2	New
UNIPRO	Leong Heng Teng	15.23	2	0
UPD	Tong Chi Kin	14.52	1	−1
UDM	Fong Chi Keong	10.37	1	New
CODEM	David Chow	10.26	1	New
ANMD	António Ng	8.73	1	0
This lists parties that won seats. See the complete results below.
President before	President after
Anabela Sales Ritchie; DCAR	Anabela Sales Ritchie; DCAR

Legislative elections were held in Macau on 3 October 1996. These were the last legislative elections took place in the colonial period before transferring Macau's sovereignty to China three years later.

== Results ==
Party	Votes	%	Seats	+/–
Association for Promoting the Economy of Macau	12,029	16.59	2	New
Union for Promoting Progress	11,045	15.23	2	0
Union for Development	10,525	14.52	1	–1
General Union for the Good of Macau	7,516	10.37	1	New
Convergence for Development	7,439	10.26	1	New
New Democratic Macau Association	6,331	8.73	1	0
Alliance for the Development of the Economy	5,085	7.01	0	New
Welfare Association	4,671	6.44	0	New
Employees and Wage-Earners Association	3,107	4.29	0	New
Roots in Macau	2,100	2.90	0	New
Friendship Association	1,690	2.33	0	–1
Association for Democracy and Social Well-Being of Macau	960	1.32	0	0
Total	72,498	100.00	8	0
Valid votes	72,498	96.54		
Invalid votes	2,128	2.83		
Blank votes	467	0.62		
Total votes	75,093	100.00		
Registered voters/turnout	116,445	64.49		
Source: Boletim Oficial

=== Members ===
Geographical constituency (8 seats)

- Association for Promoting the Economy of Macau: Chan Kai Kit (12,029) and Liu Yuk Lun (6,014)
- Union for Promoting Progress: Leong Heng Teng (11,045) and Kou Hoi In (5,522)
- Union for Development: Tong Chi Kin (10,525)
- General Union for the Good of Macau@ Fong Chi Keong (7,516)
- Convergence for Development: David Chow (7,439)
- New Democratic Macau Association: António Ng (6,331)

Functional constituencies (8 seats)

- OMKC Group (representing business) – Edmund Ho (replaced by Chui Sai Cheong in 1999). Vitor Ng, Hoi Sai Iun, and Susana Chou
- CCCAE Group (representing labor) – Lau Cheok Va and Kwan Tsui Hang
- OMCY Group (representing professional) – Leonel Alberto Alves
- DCAR Group (representing welfare, cultural, educational and sports interests) – Anabela Fátima Xavier Sales Ritchie

Nominated members (7 seats)

- José João de Deus Rodrigues do Rosário
- Raimundo Arrais do Rosário
- Joaquim Morais Alves
- Joaquim Jorge Perestrelo Neto Valente
- José Manuel de Oliveira Rodrigues
- António José Félix Pontes
- Rui António Craveiro Afonso
