= 2001 Macanese legislative election =

- 23 September 2001
- Ten of the 27 seats in the Legislative Assembly
Party	Leader	Vote %	Seats	+/–
Pro-Beijing parties
UPD	Kwan Tsui Hang	16.04	2	+1
UNIPRO	Leong Heng Teng	13.92	2	0
CODEM	David Chow	12.37	2	+1
ARSEM	Vitor Cheung Lup-kwan	12.29	1	New
AEA	João Bosco Cheang	6.38	1	+1
Pro-democracy parties
ANMD	Antonio Ng	20.95	2	+1
This lists parties that won seats. See the complete results below.
President before	President after
Susana Chou; DCAR	Susana Chou; OMKC

Legislative elections were held in Macau on 23 September 2001 for members of the 1st Legislative Assembly of Macau since the establishment of the Macau Special Administrative Region (MSAR) in 1999.

== Results ==
Party	Votes	%	Seats	+/–
Union for Development	12,990	16.04	2	+1
Union for Promoting Progress	11,276	13.92	2	0
Convergence for Development	10,016	12.37	2	+1
Association for Promotion of Social Services and Education	9,955	12.29	1	New
Employees and Wage-Earners Association	5,170	6.38	1	+1
Tourism and Recreation Culture Promotion Association	2,360	2.91	0	New
Awe-Inspiring Sunrise Association	850	1.05	0	New
Pro-Beijing camp	52,617	64.98	8	+1
New Democratic Macau Association	16,961	20.95	2	+1
New Hope	4,551	5.62	0	New
Union of Workers	700	0.86	0	New
Pro-democracy camp	22,212	27.43	2	+1
People-Friendly Association	2,216	2.74	0	New
Roots in Macau	1,569	1.94	0	0
Macao Democratic People's Livelihood Association	1,250	1.54	0	New
Middle-level People's League	877	1.08	0	New
Citizens' Rights Association	237	0.29	0	New
Total	80,978	100.00	10	+2
Valid votes	80,978	96.81		
Invalid votes	2,116	2.53		
Blank votes	550	0.66		
Total votes	83,644	100.00		
Registered voters/turnout	159,813	52.34		
Source: Boletim Oficial

=== Members ===
Directly elected members

1. Antonio Ng (ANMD, with 16,961 votes)
2. Kwan Tsui Hang (UPD, with 12,990 votes)
3. Leong Heng Teng (UPP, 11.276 votes)
4. David Chow (CODEM, with 10,016 votes)
5. Vitor Cheung Lup Kwan ( ARSEM, with 9,955 votes)
6. Au Kam San (ANMD, with 8,480.5 votes)
7. Leong Iok Wa ( UPD, with 6,495 votes)
8. Iong Weng Ian (UPP, with 5,638 votes)
9. João Bosco Cheang (AEA, with 5,170 votes)
10. Jorge Manuel Fão (CODEM, with 5,008 votes)

Members for indirect returned of the Legislative Assembly in the second term:

- Chan Chak Mo and Fong Chi Keong (DCAR –Group representing welfare, cultural, educational and sports interests: with 1 364 votes)
- Susana Chou, Hoi Sai Iun, Kou Hoi In and Cheang Chi Keong (OMKC Group representing business: with 279 votes)
- Lau Cheok Vá and Tong Chi Kin (CCCAE Group representing labor: with 261 votes)
- Chui Sai Cheong and Leonel Alberto Alves (OMCY Group representing professional: with 188 votes)
