= Pro-democracy camp (Macau) =

Political alignment in Macau

- Chinese name: 民主派
- Portuguese name: campo pró-democracia
- Founded: 1990; 36 years ago
- Ideology: Liberalism; Liberal democracy Factions: Localism; Socialism
- Colours: Yellow and blue (customary)
- Legislative Assembly of Macau: 3 / 33

The pro-democracy camp (Chinese: 民主派; Portuguese: campo pró-democracia) or pan-democracy camp (泛民主派; campo pan-democrático) is a political alignment of politicians and social activists in Macau who support increased democracy and may work together in areas of common interest or by not fielding candidates against one another in elections.

Democratic activists are usually critical of the post-1999 Macanese government and the People's Republic of China's authoritarian government, which they say does not properly represent the will of the people. Its supporters also advocate a faster pace of democratization and implementation of universal and equal suffrage.

Members of the camp represent a very broad social and political demographic, from the working class to the middle class and professionals. Opposite to the pan-democracy camp is the pro-establishment camp, whose members are perceived to be supportive of the central government of China.

== Basic beliefs ==
- Vindication of the Tiananmen Square Protests of 1989
- Democratic reform in China
- Universal suffrage in Macau
- Improve human rights (See human rights in Macau and human rights in People's Republic of China)

== History ==
Members of the camp include workers and social activists who are concerned about the question of Macau sovereignty and took part in Macau's elections in the early 1990s.

History of the pro-democracy camp can be traced back to the "livelihood faction" (Chinese: 民生派) in the 1980s, which provided welfare service and basic needs to the community. The faction, led by Alexandre Ho, gained popularity and political support, becoming the biggest challenge to the pro-Beijing traditional associations after winning three out of six directly elected seats in 1988. However, as the associations started doing the same and allocated many resources to citizens, younger supporters questioned the pro-livelihood belief, citing the lack of competitivity for providing welfare when compared to the traditional associations. In 1996 legislative election, Antonio Ng, who represented the advocates of monitoring and overseeing the administration, was elected as lawmaker, while Ho lost his re-election bid, marking the shift of the mainstream ideology in the pro-democracy camp. Some still used "pro-democracy and livelihood camp" (Chinese: 民主民生派) to show the close relationship between the two.

== Criticism of the movement ==
The movement is criticized by numerous groups including media which is controlled by the PRC mainland Chinese government authorities and post-1999 Government of Macau as an "opposition camp", since their concerns in regards to freedom of speech, freedom of press, and self-determination contradict the political stance of the PRC government. In some cases, pan-democracy activists have even been accused of high treason or being "traitors to Han Chinese".

== Members of the camp ==
Civil organizations, individual social activists, political parties, political groups and lawmakers who share a similar belief in democracy are all considered members of this camp (the number of Legislative Deputies is shown in brackets).

The following entities are routinely referred to as members of the Pan-democracy camp:

- New Macau Association
  - New Democratic Macau Association (Au Kam San has quit the association as of 2016)
  - Prosperous Democratic Macau Association
- New Hope

== Electoral performance ==
=== Legislative Council elections ===
Election	Number of popular votes	% of popular votes	Total seats	+/−	Status
2001	22,212	27.43	3 / 12	—N/a	Minority
2005	35,896▲	28.75▲	3 / 12	Steady	Minority
2009	47,987▲	33.83▲	4 / 12	▲1	Minority
2013	39,727▼	27.13▲	4 / 14	Steady	Minority
2017	46,442▲	26.90▼	4 / 14	Steady	Minority
2021	18,232▼	13.81▼	2 / 14	▼2	Minority
2025	43,361▲	26.73▲	3 / 14	▲1	Minority

== See also ==
- Pro-Beijing camp (Macau)
- List of political parties and political groups in Macau
- Pro-democracy camp (Hong Kong)
