= 1992 Macanese legislative election =

- 30 September 1992
- Eight of the 23 seats in the Legislative Assembly
- Turnout: 59.26% (▲29.61pp)
Party	Leader	Vote %	Seats	+/–
UNIPRO	Leong Heng Teng	25.25	2	New
UPD	Tong Chi Kin	23.75	2	New
ANMD	Antonio Ng	12.39	1	New
UFM	Susana Chou	7.99	1	New
SL	Alberto Noronha	7.39	1	New
Friendship	Alexandre Ho	7.13	1	−2
This lists parties that won seats. See the complete results below.
President before	President after
Anabela Sales Ritchie; Nominated Member	Anabela Sales Ritchie; DCAR

Legislative elections were held in Macau on 30 September 1992.

== Results ==
Party	Votes	%	Seats	+/–
Union for Promoting Progress	6,956	25.25	2	New
Union for Development	6,543	23.75	2	New
New Democratic Macau Association	3,412	12.39	1	New
Unity for the Future of Macau	2,201	7.99	1	New
Labor Solidarity	2,037	7.39	1	New
Friendship Association	1,965	7.13	1	–2
Three United	1,788	6.49	0	New
Association for Democracy and Social Well-Being of Macau	1,696	6.16	0	New
Electoral Union	948	3.44	0	–3
Total	27,546	100.00	8	+2
Valid votes	27,546	96.56		
Invalid votes	691	2.42		
Blank votes	289	1.01		
Total votes	28,526	100.00		
Registered voters/turnout	48,137	59.26		
Source: Boletim Oficial

=== Members ===
Geographical constituency (8 seats)

- Union for Promoting Progress: Leong Heng Teng and Kou Hou In
- Union for Development: Tong Chi Kin and Fernando Chui
- New Democratic Macau Association: Antonio Ng
- Unity for the Future of Macau: Susana Chou
- Labor Solidarity: Alberto Madeira Noronha
- Friendship Association: Alexandre Ho

Functional constituencies (8 seats)

- Business: Ma Man Kei, Edmund Ho, Pedro Segundo Pan Sau Macias (Peter Pan) and Victor Ng
- Labor: Lau Cheok Va and Pang Vai Kam
- Professionals: Leonel Alberto Alves
- Welfare, Cultural, Educational and Sports: Anabela Fátima Xavier Sales Ritchie

Nominated members (7 seats)

- José João de Deus Rodrigues do Rosário
- Raimundo Arrais do Rosário
- Beatriz Amélia Alves de Sousa Oliveira Basto da Silva
- Joaquim Jorge Perestrelo Neto Valente
- António Correia
- António José Félix Pontes
- Rui António Craveiro Afonso
