= Fong Chi Keong =

Fong Chi Keong OMIC
- 馮志強

Member of the Legislative Assembly
- In office 15 September 2013 – 17 September 2017
- Constituency: Appointed
- In office 20 September 2009 – 15 September 2013
- Preceded by: Hoi Sai Iun
- Succeeded by: José Chui
- Constituency: Business (FC)
- In office 25 September 2005 – 20 September 2009
- Preceded by: Jorge Manuel Fão
- Succeeded by: Melinda Chan
- Constituency: Macau (Directly elected)
- In office 23 September 2001 – 25 September 2005
- Succeeded by: Jorge Manuel Fão
- Constituency: Welfare, Culture, Education and Sport (FC)
- In office 3 October 1996 – 23 September 2001
- Succeeded by: Vitor Cheung
- Constituency: Macau (Directly elected)

Personal details
- Born: November 16, 1947 (age 78) Portuguese Macau

Fong Chi Keong (Chinese: 馮志強; born 16 November 1947 in Macau) was a member of the Legislative Assembly of Macau and a businessman. Fong is known for criticism of the government and the New Macau Association. Fong Chi Keong was often known as "Fong (Firing) Cannon" (馮大炮) for his radical talking in AL.

== Election results ==
Year	Candidate	Hare quota	Mandate	List Votes	List Pct
1996	Fong Chi Keong (UDM)	7,516	№4/8	7,516	10.37%
2001	Fong Chi Keong (CCCAE)	uncontested	FC	uncontested	∅
2005	Fong Chi Keong (UBM)	8,529	№9/12	8,529	6.83%
2009	Fong Chi Keong (CCCAE)	uncontested	FC	uncontested	∅
2013	Fong Chi Keong	appointed	CE	appointed	∅
