= 2021 Macanese legislative election =

- 12 September 2021
- 14 of the 33 seats in the Legislative Assembly
- Turnout: 42.38% (▼14.84 pp)
Party	Leader	Vote %	Seats	+/–
Pro-Beijing parties
ACUM	Si Ka Lon	20.14	3	+2
UPD	Ho Sut Heng	17.99	2	0
UGM	Ian Soi Kun	12.73	2	0
UNIPRO	Leong Hong Sai	11.43	2	+1
AGMM	Wong Kit Cheng	10.78	2	+1
Pro-democracy parties
NE	José Pereira Coutinho	13.80	2	+1
Unaffiliated parties
Sinergia	Ron Lam U Tou	6.64	1	+1
This lists parties that won seats. See the complete results below.
President before	President after
Kou Hoi In; OMKC	Kou Hoi In; OMKC

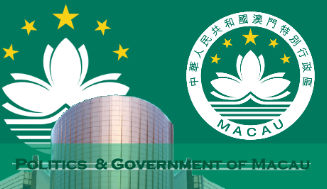

Legislative elections were held in Macau on 12 September 2021. This legislative election will return 33 members of the Legislative Assembly of Macau, with 14 directly elected by all electorates, 12 indirectly elected by special interest groups and 7 appointed by the Chief Executive 15 days after the announcement of the election results.

The voter turnout rate for the 2021 Legislative Assembly direct election stood at 42 per cent after polls closed, the lowest rate reported since the establishment of the Macau Special Administrative Region in 1999.

== Mass disqualification ==
The Electoral Affairs Commission for this legislative election unprecedentedly disqualified some 21 candidates who intended to contest in the direct elections. As a result of those 21 hopefuls having been barred from running, five candidate lists consequently became unqualified due to the electoral requirement of a minimum of 4 contenders in each list.

All pro-democracy candidates, except José Pereira Coutinho's candidate list, were barred from running in the election. The mass disqualification created shock as Macau has been seen as "obedient" to the Chinese government, while disqualifying election candidates, which had happened in Hong Kong before, was believed to be unlikely in Macau.

== Results ==
The turnout of the election was only 42.38%, marking the lowest since the 1988 election. The mass disqualification was said to be the reason of residents not voting, but officials claimed the weather and pandemic as main factors instead. The number of invalid and blank ballots broke record, with some writing "trashed election", "democracy", name of disqualified candidate Antonio Ng, or foul language.

Pro-democracy camp won 2 seats only out of 33, whilst the remaining were under the control of pro-government and pro-Beijing parties and politicians as expected.

Party	Votes	%	Seats	+/–
Macau United Citizens Association	26,599	20.14	3	+2
Union for Development	23,761	17.99	2	0
Macau-Guangdong Union	16,813	12.73	2	0
Union for Promoting Progress	15,102	11.43	2	+1
Alliance for a Happy Home	14,232	10.78	2	+1
Pro-Beijing camp	96,507	73.07	11	+2
New Hope	18,232	13.80	2	+1
Pro-democracy camp	18,232	13.80	2	–2
Synergy Power	8,764	6.64	1	+1
Civil Watch	3,729	2.82	0	–1
Strength of Dialogue	1,433	1.09	0	New
Collective Energy of Macau	918	0.70	0	New
Powers of Political Thought	834	0.63	0	0
Ou Mun Kong I	778	0.59	0	0
Platform for Young People	542	0.41	0	New
Alliance for the Promotion of the Basic Law of Macao	334	0.25	0	New
Unaffiliated	17,332	13.12	1	0
Functional constituencies and appointees
Macau Union of Employers Interests			4	0
Macau Union of Professional Interests			3	+1
Excellent Culture and Sport Union			2	0
Federation of Employees Associations			2	0
Association for the Promotion of Social Services and Education			1	0
Chief Executive appointees			7	0
Total	132,071	100.00	33	0
Valid votes	132,071	96.21		
Invalid votes	2,067	1.51		
Blank votes	3,141	2.29		
Total votes	137,279	100.00		
Registered voters/turnout	323,907	42.38		
Source: Boletim Oficial
