= New Macau Association =

- Chinese name: 新澳門學社
- Portuguese name: Associação de Macau Novo
- Chairperson: Scott Chiang Meng Hin
- Vice President: Sulu Sou Ka Hou; Jason Chao Teng Hei
- Founded: 1992
- Ideology: Liberalism; Liberal democracy
- Political position: Centre to centre-left
- National affiliation: Pro-democracy camp
- Legislative Assembly: 0 / 33

Website
- www.newmacau.org

New Macau Association

Chinese name
- Traditional Chinese: 新澳門學社
- Simplified Chinese: 新澳门学社
Transcriptions
Standard Mandarin
- Hanyu Pinyin: Xīn Àomén Xué Shè
Yue: Cantonese
- Jyutping: san1 ou3 mun4*2 hok6 se5

Portuguese name
- Portuguese: Associação de Macau Novo

The New Macau Association (AMN) is a major pro-democratic political party in the Chinese Special Administrative Region of Macau. The party was established in 1992 and the founding chairman was António Ng Kuok Cheong, who departed from the then-mainstream livelihood faction and called for political reform in the colony. The current chairman is Icy Kam Sut Leng. At the election in 2005, the group won a plurality of 18.8% of the popular vote and 2 out of 12 popular elected seats. At the 2009 election, the association split into two electoral lists – the New Democratic Macau Association and the Prosperous Democratic Macau Association. The two lists combined won 19.35% of popular vote and 3 seats in the legislature. In the 2013 election the association was split into three electoral lists with the addition of New Macau Liberals.

In July 2014, AMN's newly elected vice president, Bill Chou Kwok Ping, was suspended without pay from his position as a political scientist at the University of Macau, after he advocated universal suffrage in a move seen by students, alumni and fellow academics as part of a slide towards unprecedented censorship in Macau's universities.

In mid-October 2014, both AL deputies António Ng Kuok Cheong and Au Kam San intend to seek more independence away from AMN and further reduce the financial support to AMN and that includes 20% of their salary. Both Ng and Au would remain members of AMN but would operate within their own policies rather than AMN's board.

== Directly elected legislative assembly deputies ==
- António Ng Kuok Cheong, 1992–present (Quit the association in 2017)
- Au Kam San, 2001–present (Quit the association in 2016)
- Paul Chan Wai Chi, 2009–2013
- Sulu Sou Ka Hou, 2017–present

== Chairs ==
1. António Ng Kuok Cheong, 10 July 1992 – 10 July 1994
2. Lok Wai Chong (陸偉聰), 10 July 1994 – 10 July 1996
3. Tong Ka Io (湯家耀), 10 July 1996 – 10 July 1998
4. Au Kam Ming (區錦明), 10 July 1998 – 10 July 2000
5. Tong Ka Io (湯家耀), 10 July 2000 – 10 July 2002
6. Au Kam Ming (區錦明), 10 July 2002 – 10 July 2004
7. Carlos Sin Doe Ling (冼道寧), 10 July 2004 – 10 July 2006
8. Paul Chan Wai Chi, 10 July 2006 – 10 July 2010
9. Jason Chao Teng Hei, 10 July 2010 – 10 July 2014
10. Sulu Sou Ka Hou (蘇嘉豪), 10 July 2014 – August 2015
11. Scott Chiang Meng Hin (鄭明軒), August 2015 – 2017
12. Kam Sut leng (甘雪玲), August 2017 – present

== Legislative Assembly elections ==
Election	Number of popular votes	% of popular votes	Direct seats	FC seats	Appointed seats	Total seats	+/−	Position
1992	3,412	12.39	1	0	0	1 / 23	1▲	3rd
1996	7,439▲	8.73▼	1	0	0	1 / 23	0	6th▼
2001	16,961▲	20.95▲	1	0	0	1 / 27	0	1st▲
2005	23,472▲	18.80▼	2	0	0	2 / 29	1▲	1st
2009	27,448▲	19.35▲	3	0	0	3 / 29	1▲	1st
2013	23,039▼	15.73▼	2	0	0	2 / 33	1▼	2nd▼
2017	19,291▼	11.18▼	2	0	0	2 / 33	0	2nd

== See also ==
- Politics of Macau
- Legislative Assembly of Macau
