= Lai Kin Ian =

Antonio Lai Kin Ian

Director of Public Prosecutions

Personal details
- Born: Macau
- Occupation: prosecutor
- Profession: lawyer

Lai Kin Ian(黎建恩) is the former Director of Public Prosecution under the Procurator General of Macau. He was a senior state attorney under the Secretariat for Administration and Justice (Macau).

== See also ==
- Politics of Macau
