= CODEM =

CODEM may refer to:

- Convergence for Development, a political party in Macau.
- Convergence pour le développement du Mali, a political party in Mali.
- Colorado Democratic Party, a branch of the Democratic Party of the United States
