= Sulu Sou =

Sulu Sou Ka Hou
- 蘇嘉豪
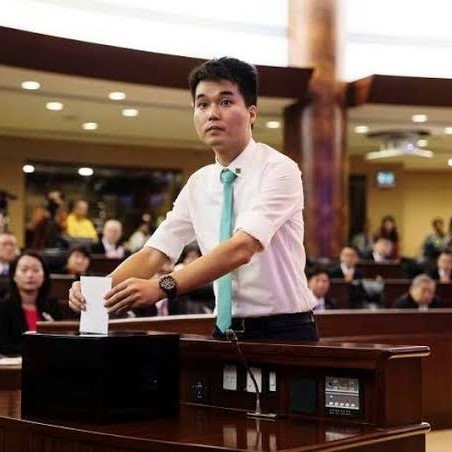

Member of the Legislative Assembly
- In office 16 October 2017 – 15 October 2021
- Constituency: Macau (Directly elected)

Personal details
- Born: 28 June 1991 (age 34) Portuguese Macau
- Party: New Macau Association
- Education: Colégio Diocesano de São José 5

Sulu Sou Ka Hou
- Traditional Chinese: 蘇嘉豪
- Simplified Chinese: 苏嘉豪
Transcriptions
Standard Mandarin
- Hanyu Pinyin: Sū Jiāháo
Yue: Cantonese
- Jyutping: sou1 gaa1 hou4

Sulu Sou Ka Hou is a Macau resident who served as a member of the Macau Legislative Assembly. In 2018, he was the youngest person in that position.

He was elected in 2017, and at that time he became the youngest member of the assembly. 9,212 people voted for him. He is a part of the New Macau Association. He stated that his goal was to have direct elections for all seats of the assembly.

On 15 May 2016, he held a protest near Macau Chief Executive Fernando Chui's house against the Macao Foundation's "black box" donation to Jinan University (Chief Executive Chui was also the chairman of the foundation's trust committee and the vice chairman of the university). This protest was later deemed illegal by the government. On 4 December 2017, his fellow legislators passed (28 vs 4 votes) a motion to suspend Sou from the assembly so he could be prosecuted under Macau law. In May 2018, he was declared guilty and ordered to pay a fine of MOP 40,800 (US$5,000). As the conviction did not involve any jail time, he was then reinstated as a member of the Legislative Assembly on 3 July 2018. He expressed his intention to run for office again after the fine.

In 2021, he filed a request for the Macau government to provide information in English.

The Macau Daily Times ranked Sou as "Person of the Year" in 2017.

By September 2021, the courts ruled he was not sufficiently loyal to the government and so was unable to keep his seat in the assembly.
