= David Chow =

David Chow may refer to:

- David Chow (The Young and the Restless), a fictional character in the American soap opera The Young and the Restless
- David Chow (politician) (born 1950), member of the Legislative Assembly of Macau
