= ADDC =

ADDC may refer to:

- Associação Direitos dos Cidadãos, the Portuguese name of the Citizens' Rights Association, a Macau political party
- Abu Dhabi Desert Challenge
- AC/DC, an Australian rock band
