= Chan Kai-kit =

Macanese businessman and politician

- 陳繼杰

Member of Legislative Assembly of Macau
- In office 1996 – 19 December 1999
- Succeeded by: Iong Weng-ian

Personal details
- Born: Chio Ho-cheong; 23 March 1950 (age 76) Thailand
- Party: Macau Economy and People's Livelihood Promotion Association

Tommy Chan Kai-kit (born 23 March 1950), born Chio Ho-cheong, is a Macanese businessman who was a member of the Legislative Assembly of Macau and of the Chinese People's Political Consultative Conference. Following the revelation that Chan was the mastermind behind the fraud case of Guangnan Holding, he was wanted by Hong Kong's Independent Commission Against Corruption (ICAC). His whereabouts have since remained unknown.

== Family ==
In 1950, Chan Kai-kit was born in a Chinese family in Thailand, whose roots can trace back to Sanjiang, Hainan. Chan's grandfather left Hainan for Thailand because of poverty, and married a member of a Thai royal family. Chan, whose father was a tycoon in Thailand, was therefore a descendant of the Thai royal.

Two years later, Chan and his family moved to Guangzhou. After graduating from Guangzhou's high school, he studied the Thai language at Chulalongkorn University, Bangkok for two years. He was then awarded an Honorary Doctorate in Louisiana and, in 1995, in Britain.

== Business career ==
In 1979, Chan started managing his family business, but was forced to give up after relatives' objection. After travelling to Hong Kong in 1982, he set up factories in Zhuhai and Macau to produce plastic gloves amid the spread of AIDS-phobia throughout Europe and America. The venture gave him the first success in business. He went back to Macau in 1985, and founded a dozen more businesses. On 10 June 1992, Chan was awarded the Order of St. George for his contributions to the economic development of Macau and other regions. He became the first Chinese in Macau to have a knighthood.

In 1991, Chan met Elsie Chan, who lost the Miss Asia Pageant in 1986. The pair broke up in 1998. During October 1991 and 1993, the two defrauded the Agricultural Bank of China of HK$364 million when purchasing land in Mai Po, Hong Kong.

== Political career ==
In December 1993, the United States Congress approved appointing Chan as the first Macanese special adviser. He received the certificate and a flag of the United States in January 1994, which is the only U.S. flag permitted by the Macanese authorities to fly. In August 1994, Chan founded the first province-level townsmen group, the Macau Hoi Nam Association, and was elected the leader. In September 1996, Chan ran for the Legislative Assembly under the party of "Macau Economy and People's Livelihood Promotion Association", and received the highest number of votes amongst all candidates, banishing Fernando Chui, who would become the Chief Executive of Macau, from re-election. While claims of bribery were investigated during the election, there was eventually no conclusion.

In January 1998, Chan was appointed the Macanese deputy to the 9th Chinese People's Political Consultative Conference (CPPCC), and deputy to the Hainan CPPCC. However, The Wall Street Journal in the United States reported the scandal of Bill Clinton, then President of the United States, of receiving political cash, which involved Chan, who once took a photo with Clinton. Two months later, Chan purchased a Ukrainian aircraft carrier with around 150 million dollars. His plan to transform the carrier into a hotel and casino was rejected by the Macanese Government.

== Scandal ==
In November 1998, Goldman Sachs discovered accounting improprieties for Guangnan Holding, which in early 1999 declared an inability to pay for the debts accounting for 130 million RMB. Following investigations by Hong Kong's Independent Commission Against Corruption (ICAC), Chan was accused of conspiracy to defraud Guangnan Holding in 1999 along with others. The last appearance of Chan was on 21 April 1998 attending a Legislative Assembly meeting. On 8 June 1999, Chan was officially wanted by the ICAC. (Note: ICAC had requested the Legislative Assembly of Macau to authorize the arrest of Chan by the Macanese police, but was declined to cite extraterritorial jurisdiction.) As Chan did not apply to stay in the Legislative Assembly after the Transfer of sovereignty over Macau in 1999, the Preparatory Committee for the Macau Special Administrative Region decided in August 1999 to hold a by-election for the vacancy. Iong Weng-ian was elected by the Selection Committee on 20 September 1999 to succeed Chan. The whereabouts of Chan remain unknown today.

== See also ==
- List of fugitives from justice who disappeared
