= Paul Chan Wai-chi =

Macau politician

Paul Chan Chan Wai Chi
- 陳偉智
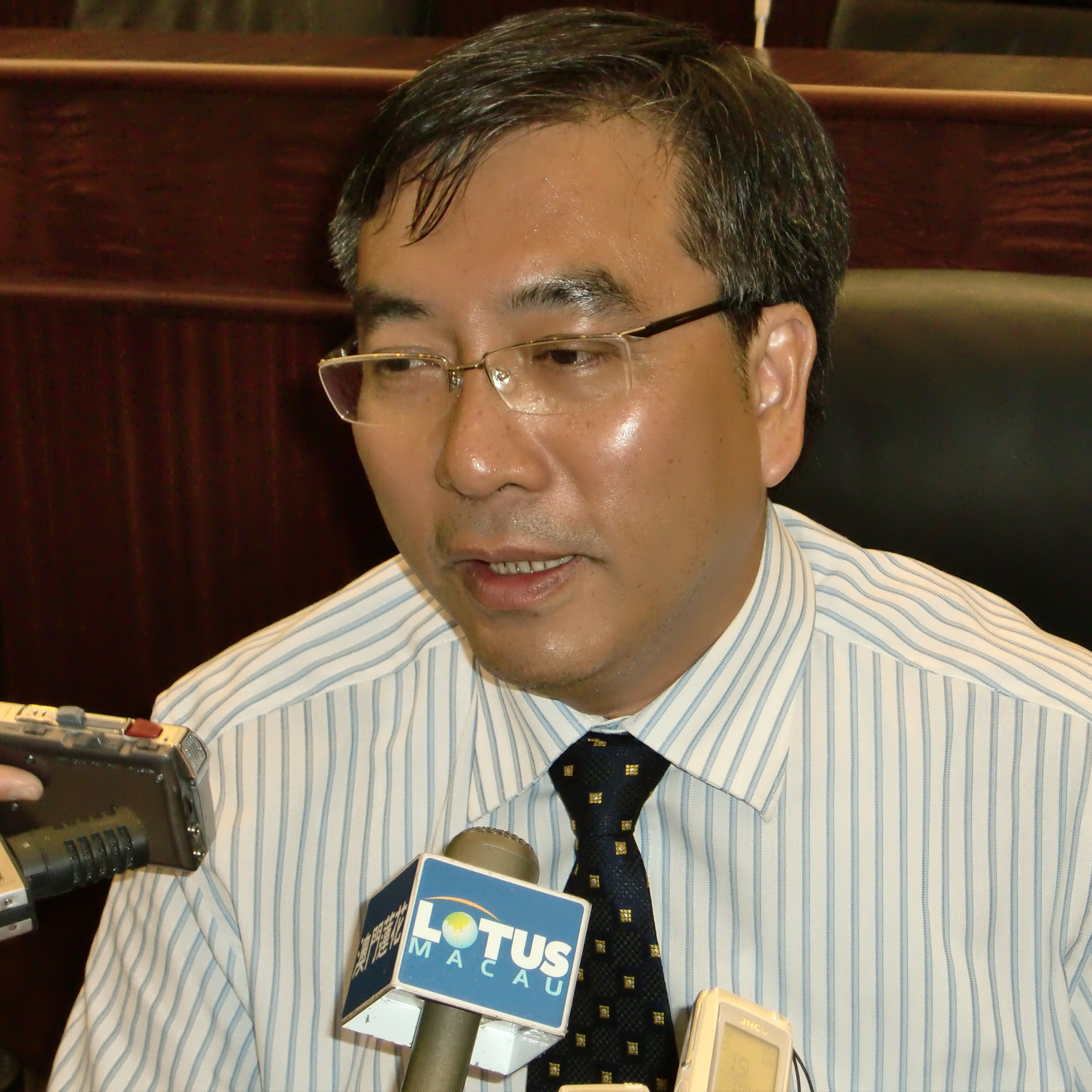
- Paul Chan Wai-chi

Member of the Legislative Assembly
- Incumbent
- Assumed office 20 September 2009
- Preceded by: David Chow
- Constituency: Macau (Directly elected)

Personal details
- Born: 4 January 1957 (age 69) Portuguese Macau
- Party: New Democratic Macau Association

Chinese name
- Traditional Chinese: 陳偉智
- Simplified Chinese: 陈伟智
- Hanyu Pinyin: Chén Wěizhì
- Yale Romanization: Chàhn Wáih-ji

Paul Chan Wai Chi (Chinese: 陳偉智; born 4 January 1957) is a Macau politician, who is the President of New Democratic Macau Association and a member of the Legislative Assembly of Macau. He is one of the three pro-democracy lawmakers in Macau.

Chan graduated from Yuet Wah College. In 2009, he participated in the legislative election in the candidate list led by Antonio Ng, and won the third seat for the Macau democracy camp.

== Election results ==
Year	Candidate	Hare quota	Mandate	List Votes	List Pct
2009	Paul Chan (APMD)	8,212	No.11/12	16,424	11.58%

== See also ==
- List of members of the Legislative Assembly of Macau
