= Kwan Tsui Hang =

Macanese politician

- 關翠杏
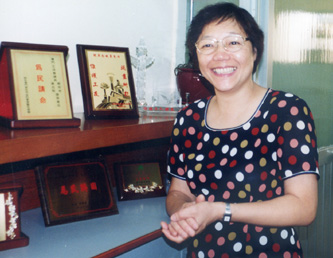

Member of the Legislative Assembly
- Incumbent
- Assumed office 20 December 1999
- Constituency: Macau (Directly elected)
- In office 3 October 1996 – 20 December 1999
- Constituency: Labor (FC)

Personal details
- Born: September 22, 1949 (age 76) Portuguese Macau
- Party: Union for Development
- Spouse: Lei Kuok Vá

Kwan Tsui Hang (Chinese: 關翠杏; born 22 September 1949 in Macau) is a member of the Legislative Assembly of Macau. Kwan Tsui Hang obtained her graduate degree in sociology at University of Hong Kong and Jinan University. Kwan Tsui Hang is married to Lee Kuok Vá and have two sons.

== Election results ==
Year	Candidate	Hare quota	Mandate	List Votes	List Pct
1996	Kwan Tsui Hang (CCCAE)	uncontested	FC	uncontested	∅
2001	Kwan Tsui Hang (UPD)	6,495	№2/10	12,990	16.04%
2005	Kwan Tsui Hang (UPD)	8,298	№3/12	16,596	13.29%
2009	Kwan Tsui Hang (UPD)	11,049	№1/12	22,098	14.88%
2013	Kwan Tsui Hang (UPD)	11,961	№7/14	11,961	8.17%
