= Association for Helping the Community and Engagement with the People =

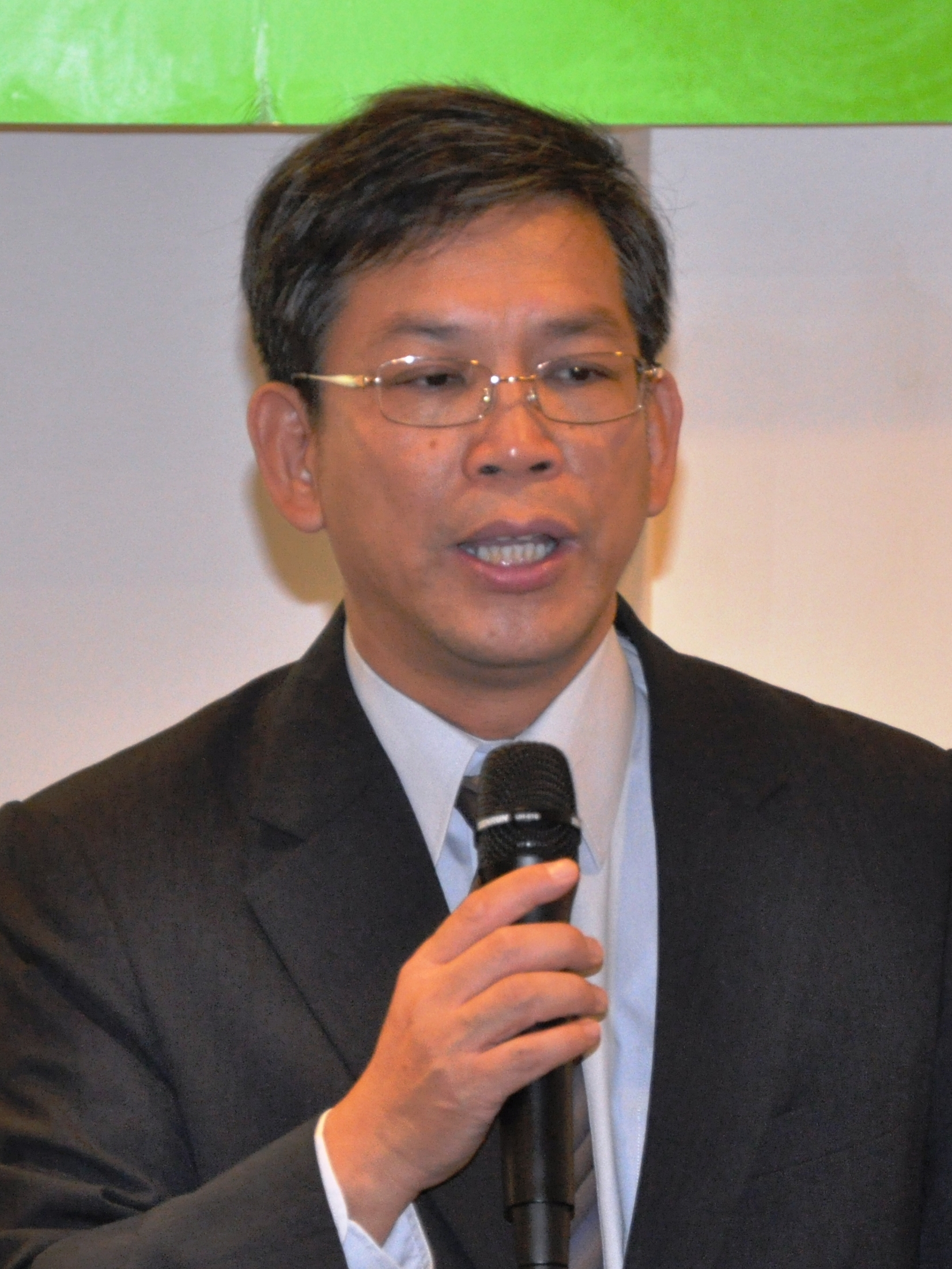
Paul Pun Chi Meng

The Association for Helping the Community and Engagement with the People (simplified Chinese: 亲民爱群协会; traditional Chinese: 親民愛群協會, Portuguese: Associação de Apoio à Comunidade e Proximidade do Povo) is a political party in the Chinese Special Administrative Region of Macau.

== Overview ==
Macau is a state in which political parties don't play a role, though some civic groups put forward lists at the elections and might be considered parties. At the 2005 Macanese legislative election, the group won 2.4% of the popular vote and 0 out of 12 popular elected seats. In these elections they were led by Paul Pun Chi Meng.

They ran for election in 2009 and in 2013.

They follow the Catholic social teaching as their main platform.

== See also ==
- Politics of Macau
