= Lee Chong Cheng =

Macanese politician

- 李從正
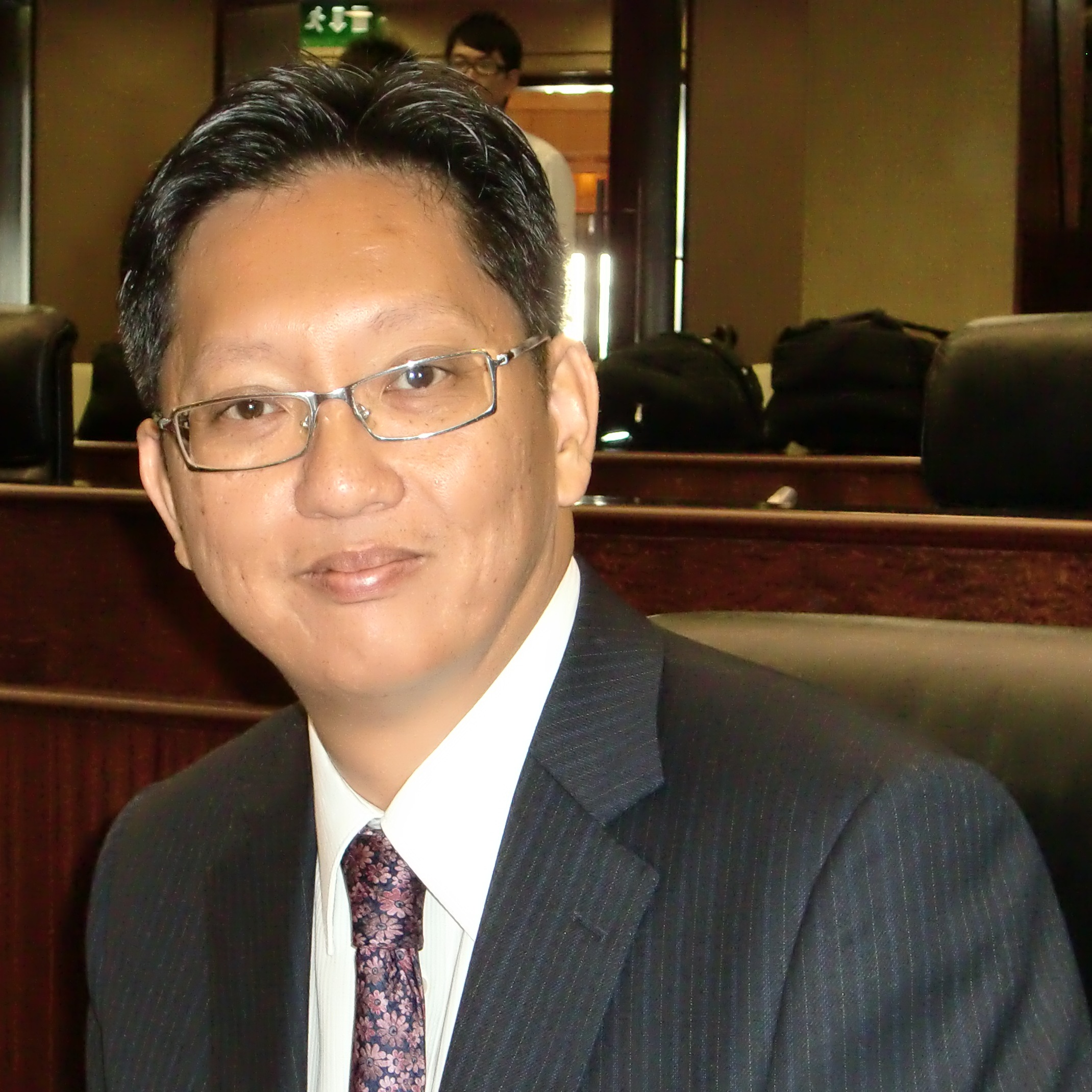

Member of the Legislative Assembly
- Incumbent
- Assumed office 20 September 2009
- Preceded by: Leong Iok Wa
- Constituency: Macau (Directly elected)
- In office 25 September 2005 – 20 September 2009
- Preceded by: Tong Chi Kin
- Succeeded by: Lam Heong Sang
- Constituency: Macau (Directly elected)

Personal details
- Born: November 16, 1965 (age 60) Portuguese Macau
- Party: United Citizens Association of Macau

Lee Chong Cheng (Chinese: 李從正; born 16 November 1965 in Macau) is a member of the Legislative Assembly of Macau. Lee Chong Cheng was first elected through the Labor functional constituency representing Employees Association Joint Candidature Commission (CCCAE) later directly elected through the Geographical constituency.

== Election results ==
Year	Candidate	Hare quota	Mandate	List Votes	List Pct
2005	Lee Chong Cheng (CCCAE)	uncontested	FC	uncontested	∅
2009	Lee Chong Cheng (ACUM)	8,507	№2/12	17,014	12.00%

== See also ==
- List of members of the Legislative Assembly of Macau
