= Pro-Beijing camp (Macau) =

Political alignment in Macau

- Flags of the People's Republic of China and the Chinese Communist Party
- Chinese name: 親北京陣營
- Portuguese name: Campo Pró-Pequim
- Founded: Early 1990s
- Ideology: Conservatism; Chinese nationalism Factions: Socialism; Economic liberalism
- Colours: Red and green (customary)
- Legislative Assembly of Macau: 30 / 33
- Election Committee: 390 / 400
- NPC (Macau deputies): 12 / 12

Pro-Beijing camp

Chinese name
- Traditional Chinese: 親北京陣營
- Simplified Chinese: 亲北京阵营
Transcriptions
Standard Mandarin
- Hanyu Pinyin: Qīn Běijīng Zhènyíng
Yue: Cantonese
- Yale Romanization: Chān bāk gīng jahn yìhng
- Jyutping: Can^{1} bak^{1} ging^{1} zan^{6} jing^{4}

Portuguese name
- Portuguese: Campo Pró-Pequim

The pro-Beijing camp, pro-establishment camp or pro-China camp (Chinese: 建制派 or 親中派; Portuguese: campo pró-Pequim, campo pró-estabelecimento or campo pró-China) is a political alignment in Macau which supports the policies and views of the Chinese government and the Chinese Communist Party before and after the handover of Macau on 20 December 1999. The term can be used to identify politicians, political parties and individuals. Their rivals are the pro-democracy camp.

== History ==
=== Prior to handover ===
Some of the political groups within the pro-establishment camp, such as the Union for Development and Progress Promotion Union have had a long history of following the directions of the People's Republic of China and of loyalty to the Chinese Communist Party since the colonial period.

== Policies ==
Pro-establishment members are united by the political ideology or economic policies of being closer to Beijing, as much out of pragmatism as of conviction, but vary on other issues within the context of Macau.

== Members of the camp ==
Civil organisations, individual social activists, political parties, political groups and lawmakers who share a similar belief in democracy are all considered members of this camp. (number of Legislative Deputies shown in brackets)

The following entities are routinely referred to as members of the Pro-establishment camp:

- Traditional Leftists
  - Employees Association Joint Candidature Commission
  - New Union for Macau's Development
  - Macau Federation of Trade Unions and Union for Development
  - General Union of Neighbourhood Associations of Macau and Progress Promotion Union
  - Macau Chinese Chamber of Commerce
  - Women's General Association of Macau
- Pro-business
  - Macau United Citizens Association
  - Macau-Guangdong Union
  - Alliance for Change
- Functional groups
  - Macau Business Interest Union
  - Macau professional Interest Union
  - Excellent Culture and Sports Union Association

== Electoral performance ==
=== Legislative Council elections ===
Election	Number of popular votes	% of popular votes	Total seats	+/−	Status
2001	52,617	62.99	9 / 12	—N/a	Majority
2005	88,949▲	71.26▲	9 / 12	Steady	Majority
2009	93,810▲	66.16▼	8 / 12	▼1	Majority
2013	92,251▼	62.99▼	10 / 14	▲2	Majority
2017	99,366▲	57.56▼	9 / 14	▼1	Majority
2021	105,256▲	79.71▲	11 / 14	▲2	Majority
2025	118,847▲	73.27▼	11 / 14	Steady	Majority

== See also ==
- United front in Hong Kong
- Pro-Beijing camp (Hong Kong)
- List of political parties and political groups in Macau
