= Jason Chao =

Macanese activist

Jason Chao Chao Teng Hei
- 周庭希
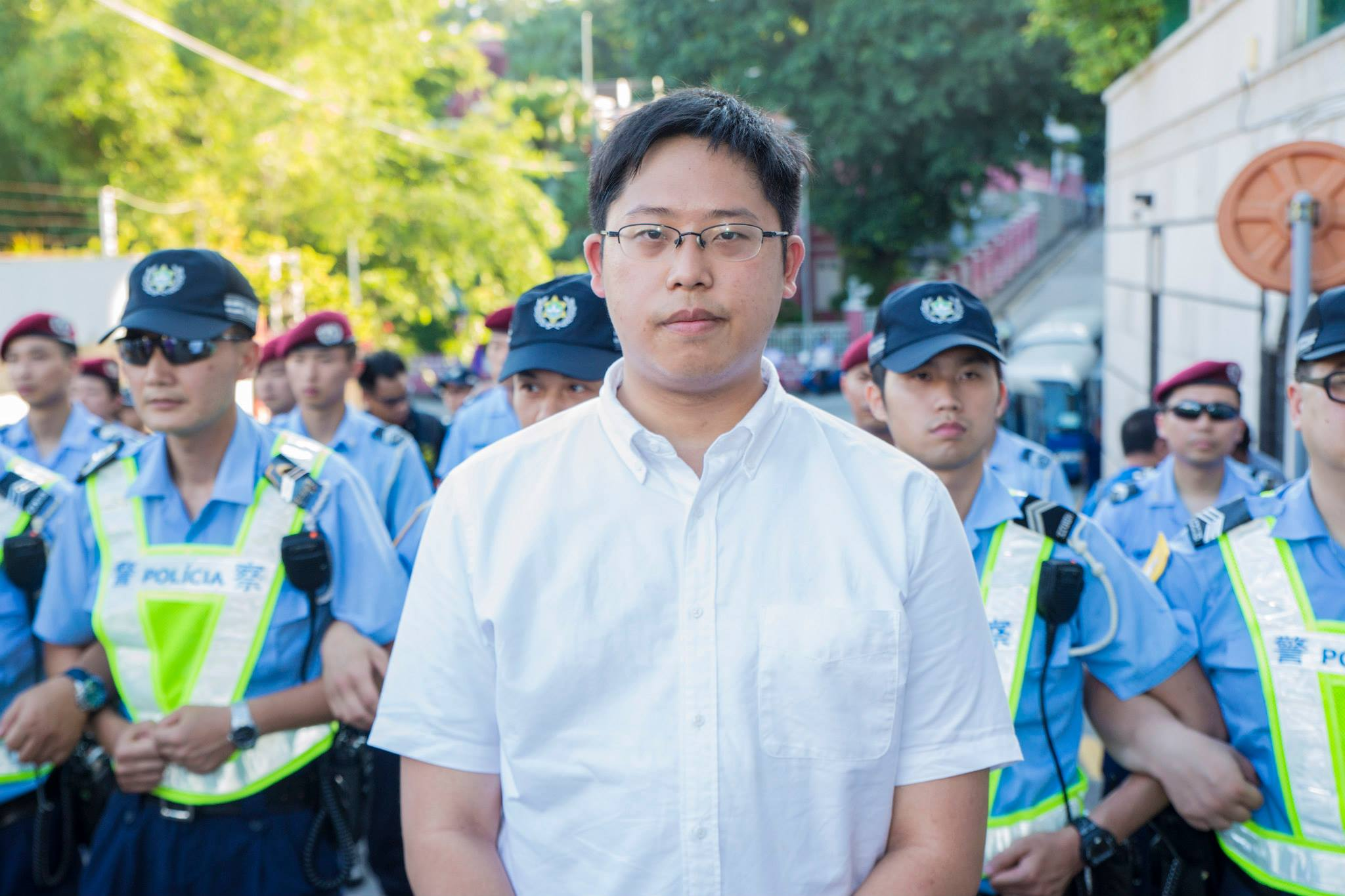

president of the New Macau Association
- In office 2010–2014

Personal details
- Born: December 12, 1986 (age 39) Portuguese Macau
- Party: New Macau Association (until 2017)
- Education: Master of Science in Big Data and Digital Futures from University of Warwick; Master of Arts in Human Rights Law from SOAS University of London; Bachelor of Arts in Communications from the University of Macau

Jason Chao Teng Hei (Chinese: 周庭希; pinyin: Zhōu Tíngxī; born December 12, 1986) is a social activist and LGBT rights campaigner born in Macau. He is a director of Hongkongers in Britain. He was President of the New Macau Association and Director of the satirical newspaper Macau Concealer, one of the few online pro-democracy media in the city. He co-founded activist organisation Macau Conscience and the Rainbow of Macau.

== Political Stance ==
Jason Chao is one of the few democracy and human rights activists originally from Macau. Chao believes that Macau is idealess and lacks core values. Chao believes "Macau is an utterly unconvincing example of 'one country two systems', which entails Chinese promises of a 'high degree of autonomy', an independent judiciary and the rule of law". He urges the international community to firmly stand with Hong Kong in the fight against dictatorship.

== Human Rights Reports ==
In June 2020, in collaboration with the New Macau Association, Chao submitted a comprehensive civil society report to the United Nations Human Rights Committee on human rights issues in Macau. The report covered freedom of expression, judicial procedure, privacy rights, government surveillance and the realisation of universal suffrage. The issues raised in the report were adopted by the United Nations Human Rights Committee in its review of Macau's ratification of the International Covenant on Civil and Political Rights.

== Social and Political Actions ==
=== 2010 ===
Elected as the president of the New Macau Association.

=== 2011 ===
- In June, Chao campaigned against a high-rise building proposal that would hugely impact the landscape of the Small Taipa Hill, by holding a referendum.
- In December, Chao revealed that government misled the public to respond in favour of putting more regulations on the journalists and news media at the consultation on revising the Publishing Law and Audio-visual Law.

=== 2012 ===
- During the consulting period for political reform at Macau, Chao fought for universal suffrage in the election of Legislative Assembly and Chief Executive, by conducting survey, holding a referendum and going on a hunger strike. However, he failed to accomplish it under pro-establishment organizations’ overwhelming propaganda.
- Chao exposed that the free Wi-Fi service provided by the MSAR government would decrypt users’ protected data and enforce censorship.
- Chao co-founded the activist organization Macau Conscience in July with several netizens including Bill Chou, an associate professor at the University of Macau.
- In November, Chao co-authored with Bill Chou the second annual NGO Human Rights Report on Macau for 2012.

=== 2013 ===
- In January, Chao conducted the “Initial Survey on LGBT individuals in Macau”, which is the first-ever survey on the LGBT community in Macau, for the Macau LGBT Rights Concern Group.
- Chao revealed the architecture of the new campus of the University of Macau was in fact a copycat of the architecture of Nanjing Audit University, which had been constructed a few years earlier.
- Chao and associate professor Bill Chou had a video conference with the Human Rights Committee of the United Nations, in which they revealed the human right violations in Macau that were never mentioned in the report submitted by the MSAR government.
- By invitation of the European Union, Chao visited the EU committee in Brussels and the European Council in Strasbourg in May. He is the first Macau citizen from NGOs to be invited by the EU. During his visit, Chao met with several EU officials and leaders of NGOs headquartered in Brussels.

=== 2014 ===
Chao was arrested for organising 2014 Macanese Chief Executive referendum.

=== 2019 ===
Jason Chao and Man Tou appealed to the Court of Final Appeal against a ban imposed by the public security police on a proposed rally against the police brutality in 2019–20 Hong Kong protests. The Court denied the appeal.

=== 2024 ===
On 30 May 2024, Chao announced on Facebook that he has acquired British citizenship.

== LGBT Rights Movement ==
=== First Involvement ===
In November 2012, the MSAR government withdrew same-sex cohabitants from the domestic violence legislation, leaving LGBT individuals unprotected under the proposed counter-domestic violence law. Later, in December, Chao and some of his friends founded the Macau LGBT Rights Concern Group, which marks the beginning of LGBT rights movement in Macau. The group then organized the first Rainbow Equality Parade, dedicated to fighting for LGBT rights, including the protection under domestic violence legislation.

=== Coming Out ===
In January 2013, the Macau LGBT Rights Concern Group conducted a survey over LGBT individuals’ situation in Macau. On the day the results being published, Chao announced publicly his sex orientation towards males.

=== Recent Activities ===
- In February 2013, Chao believed that the fact that the government did not include same-sex cohabitants in domestic violence legislation might violate the International Covenant on Civil and Political Rights, seeing it as discrimination against the LGBT community. Therefore, he sent a letter to United Nations Human Rights Committee, hoping that UN could intervene in this scenario.
- In April 2013, Macau Rainbow was established; the Macau LGBT Rights Concern Group became an affiliated organization in which Chao is the spokesperson.
- On the International Day against Homophobia, 2013, Chao, representing Macau Rainbow, held a flash mob at the Ruins of St. Pauls.
