= 2005 Macanese legislative election =

- 25 September 2005
- 12 of the 29 seats in the Legislative Assembly
| Party | Leader | Vote % | Seats | +/– |
Pro-Beijing parties
| ACUM | Chan Meng Kam | 16.57 | 2 | New |
| UPD | Kwan Tsui Hang | 13.29 | 2 | 0 |
| UNIPRO | Leong Heng Teng | 9.60 | 2 | 0 |
| AMD | Leong On-kei | 9.32 | 1 | New |
| UBM | Fong Chi-keong | 6.83 | 1 | New |
| CODEM | David Chow | 4.87 | 1 | 0 |
Pro-democracy parties
| ANMD | Antonio Ng | 18.81 | 2 | 0 |
| NE | José Pereira Coutinho | 7.99 | 1 | +1 |
This lists parties that won seats. See the complete results below.
| President before | President after |
|---|---|
| Susana Chou; OMKC | Susana Chou; OMKC |

Legislative elections were held in Macau on 25 September 2005.

== Electoral system ==
Twelve candidates are elected directly using the highest averages method on party lists with divisors of 1,2,4,8 etc. There are 18 party lists, the highest ever, with a total of 125 candidates, also the highest ever. 5 of the lists are related to gambling.

10 candidates are elected by the functional constituencies. The seats are distributed like the directly elected seats. There is one list for each category. There are:

- 4 seats for employers
- 2 seats for labour
- 2 seats for special interests and
- 2 seats for charity, culture, education and sport

7 seats are appointed by the Chief Executive.

== Results ==
| Party | Votes | % | Seats | +/– |
|---|---|---|---|---|
| Macau United Citizens Association | 20,701 | 16.57 | 2 | New |
| Union for Development | 16,596 | 13.29 | 2 | 0 |
| Union for Promoting Progress | 11,989 | 9.60 | 2 | 0 |
| Alliance for the Development of Macau | 11,642 | 9.32 | 1 | New |
| General Union for the Good of Macau | 8,529 | 6.83 | 1 | New |
| Convergence for Development | 6,081 | 4.87 | 1 | 0 |
| Association for Democracy and Social Well-Being of Macau | 4,358 | 3.49 | 0 | New |
| New Youth of Macau | 3,058 | 2.45 | 0 | New |
| Association for Helping the Community and Engagement with the People | 2,943 | 2.36 | 0 | New |
| Vision Macau | 1,974 | 1.58 | 0 | New |
| Labor Union of Games and Gambling in Macau | 921 | 0.74 | 0 | New |
| Citizens' Rights Association | 191 | 0.15 | 0 | 0 |
| Pro-Beijing camp | 88,949 | 71.22 | 9 | +1 |
| New Democratic Macau Association | 23,489 | 18.81 | 2 | 0 |
| New Hope | 9,974 | 7.99 | 1 | +1 |
| For Macau | 892 | 0.71 | 0 | New |
| Association for Democracy Activism | 655 | 0.52 | 0 | New |
| Union of Workers | 457 | 0.37 | 0 | 0 |
| New Vigour for Macau | 448 | 0.36 | 0 | New |
| Pro-democracy camp | 35,896 | 28.74 | 3 | 0 |
| Total | 124,898 | 100.00 | 12 | +2 |
| Valid votes | 124,898 | 96.95 | | |
| Invalid votes | 3,272 | 2.54 | | |
| Blank votes | 660 | 0.51 | | |
| Total votes | 128,830 | 100.00 | | |
| Registered voters/turnout | 220,653 | 58.39 | | |
Source: Boletim Oficial

=== Geographical constituencies ===
| List № | Party/Allegiance | Candidate(s) | Votes | % | Seats |
|---|---|---|---|---|---|
| 1 | _{For Macau; Por Macau} | José Luís de Sales Marques; Maria de Fátima Salvandor dos Santos Ferreira; Ao Vai Heng; Carlos Alberto Lopes Gomes da Silva; Nuno Miguel Martins Calçada Bastos | 892 | 0.71 | 0 |
| 2 | _{New Vigour for Macau; Un Novo Vigor de Macau (UNVM)} | Yu Kun Chin; Fong Man Tat; Wong Wing Ping; Lam Kuai San; Leong Chon Lan; Leong Hoi Sun; Cheong Ka Man | 448 | 0.36 | 0 |
| 3 | _{New Democratic Macau Association; Associação Novo Macau Democrático (ANMD)} | "António" Ng Kuok Cheong; Au Kam San "Paul" Chan Wai Chi; Chu Kuok Kun "Jack" Leong Hoi Chak; Kong Shun Mei | 23,489 | 18.81 | 2 |
| 4 | _{Association for Democracy Activism; Associação do Activismo para a Democracia (AAD)} | Lee Kin Yun; Leong Seak; Kuong Kai Nang; Un Wai Cheng | 655 | 0.52 | 0 |
| 5 | _{New Youth of Macau; Nova Juventude de Macau (NJM)} | U Wai Ang; Chan Hong; Si Tou Ieng Lit; Chang Heng Pan; Chan Sao Chai; Tou Chak Seng; Choi Leong; Kou Chin Meng | 3,058 | 2.45 | 0 |
| 6 | _{Union of Workers; União dos Operários (UO)} | Lei Man Chao; Ho Heng Kuok; Chu Chio Ieng; Leong Kin Wang; Chong Seak Long; Luok Kam Ian; Tang Kuok Leong; Leong | 457 | 0.37 | 0 |
| 7 | _{Union for Promoting Progress; União Promotora para o Progresso (UPP)} | leong Heng Teng; Iong Weng Ian; Antonio Ferreira; Charles Chen Chien Ying; Wong Lai Heng; Lei Kin Kei; Chan Peng Hou; Vong Io Kao; Lam Un Mui; Ho Ion Sang; Wan Wing Kee; Ng Wan Sin | 11,989 | 9.60 | 2 |
| 8 | _{General Union for the Good of Macau; União Geral para O Bem-querer de Macau (UBM)} | Fong Chi Keong; Lau Veng Seng; Wong Kin Chong; Mak Soi Kun; Ma Chi Seng "Joseph" Lai Iek Sang | 8,529 | 6.83 | 1 |
| 9 | _{Alliance for the Development of Macau; Aliança para Desenvolvimento de Macau (AMD)} | Angela Leong On Kei; Ambrose So; Fok Chi Chiu; Mok Kai Meng; Cheong Sai; Tsui Po Fung; Siu Yu Hong | 11,642 | 9.33 | 1 |
| 10 | _{Association for Democracy and Social Well-Being of Macau; Associação Pela Democracia e Bem-estar Social de Macau (ADBSM)} | Wong Cheong Nam; Leung Kuok Chao; Kuok Tit San; Lio Sio Fong | 4,358 | 3.49 | 0 |
| 11 | _{Vision Macau; Associação Visão de Macau (AVM)} | Lou I Wa; Leong Sio Pui; Vong Pui Lam; Wong Chung Yuan | 1,974 | 1.58 | 0 |
| 12 | _{Labor Union of Games and Gambling in Macau; União dos Trabalhadores dos Jogos de Fortuna e Azar de Macau (UTJM)} | João Bosco Cheang Hong Lok; Leong Sun Iok; Cheang Hong Lok; Ma Ching Man; Che Tai Koc; Lou Io Wa; Ho Tai Chi; Leung Wood Ming | 921 | 0.74 | 0 |
| 13 | _{Convergence for Development; Convergência para o Desenvolvimento (CODEM)} | David Chow Kam Fai; Frederick Yip Wing Fat; Monica Micaela de Assis Cordeiro; Lou Wai Sek; Lao Mui Kuai; Tang Kin Wai; Pun Kin Keong; Ip Tat; Ling Man Yi; Ieong Weng Seng; Herculan José Rodrigues Ribeiro; Lai Hong Peng | 6,081 | 7.87 | 1 |
| 14 | _{Union for Development; União para o Desenvolvimento (UPD)} | Kwan Tsui Hang; Leong Iok Wa; Vong Kuoc Ieng; Lam Teng; Yuen Yiu Ting; Ip Iu Veng; Cheong Man Fun; Anne Siu Siu Man; Lo Soi I | 16,596 | 13.29 | 2 |
| 15 | _{Association for Helping the Community and Engagement with the People; Associação de Apoio à Comunidade e Proximidade do Povo (AACPP)} | Pun Chi Meng; Luzia Ho Pui Kam; O Soi Wong; Fong Lai Meng; Fong Lai Meng; Au Ieong Lai Seong; Hoi Chong Chak | 2,943 | 2.36 | 0 |
| 16 | _{New Hope; Nova Esperança (NE)} | José Maria Pereira Coutinho; Leong Veng Chai; Chan Kun Van; Ann Maria Manhão Sou; Melina Tam Leng I | 9,974 | 7.99 | 1 |
| 17 | _{Citizens' Rights Association; Associação Direitos dos Cidadãos (ADDC)} | Cheok Veng Sang; Chan Veng Un; Leung Wai Ming; Ho Im Peng; Wong Sok Ieng; Tam Kam Seng; Vong Kam Tong; Lau Son Lin | 191 | 0.15 | 0 |
| 18 | _{United Citizens Association of Macau; Associação dos Cidadãos Unidos de Macau (ACUM)} | Chan Meng Kam; Ung Choi Kun; Wu Lin; Sze Lee Ah; Loi Kun Fat; Chao Lai Kun; Ngan Un Kong | 20,701 | 16.57 | 2 |
| TOTAL | | | 124,898 | 100 | 12 |

=== Functional constituencies (10 seats) ===
Business (4 seats)
| Party/Allegiance | List № | Candidate(s) | Votes |
| _{Macau Business Interest Union; União dos Interesses Empresariais de Macau} | 1 | Susana Chou Kei Jan | 462 |
| _{Macau Business Interest Union; União dos Interesses Empresariais de Macau} | 2 | Kou Hoi In | 231 |
| _{Macau Business Interest Union; União dos Interesses Empresariais de Macau} | 3 | Cheang Chi Keong | 115.50 |
| _{Macau Business Interest Union; União dos Interesses Empresariais de Macau} | 4 | Ho Teng Iat | 57.750 |
Labor (2 seats)
| _{Employees Association Joint Candidature Commission; Comissão Conjunta da Candidatura das Associações de Empregados} | 1 | Lau Cheok Va | 419 |
| _{Employees Association Joint Candidature Commission; Comissão Conjunta da Candidatura das Associações de Empregados} | 2 | Lee Chong Cheng | 209.5 |
Professionals (2 seats)
| _{Macau professional Interest Union; União dos Interesses Profissionais de Macau} | 1 | Chui Sai Cheong | 247 |
| _{Macau professional Interest Union; União dos Interesses Profissionais de Macau} | 2 | Leonel Alberto Alves | 123.5 |
Welfare, Culture, Education and Sport (2 seats)
| _{Excellent Culture and Sports Union Association; Associação União Cultural e Desportiva Excelente} | 1 | Victor Cheung Lup Kwan | 1,449 |
| _{Excellent Culture and Sports Union Association; Associação União Cultural e Desportiva Excelente} | 2 | Chan Chak Mo | 724.5 |

=== Nominated Members (7 seats) ===
Members appointed by the Chief Executive Edmund Ho Hau Wah

- Lei Pui Lam
- Sam Chan Io
- Tsui Wai Kwan
- "José" Chui Sai Peng
- Philip Xavier
- Ieong Tou Hong
- Lao Pun Lap
