= Macau Federation of Trade Unions =

Labour and political group in Macau

- Chinese name: 澳門工會聯合總會
- Portuguese name: Federação das Associações dos Operários de Macau
- Abbreviation: MFTU
- President: Ho Sut Heng
- Chairperson: Lee Chong Cheng
- Founded: 20 January 1950; 76 years ago
- Headquarters: Federation of Trade Unions Building, 2–6 Rua da Ribeira do Patane, Macau
- Membership (2010): 50,000+
- Ideology: Socialism; Labourism; Left-conservatism; Chinese nationalism; Historical: Anti-imperialism; Marxism
- Political position: Left-wing; Historical: Far-left
- National affiliation: All-China Federation of Trade Unions
- Regional affiliation: Pro-Beijing
- Colours: Red
- Legislative Assembly: 3 / 33

Election symbol

Website
- www.faom.org.mo

Macau Federation of Trade Unions

Chinese name
- Traditional Chinese: 澳門工會聯合總會
- Simplified Chinese: 澳门工会联合总会
Transcriptions
Standard Mandarin
- Hanyu Pinyin: Àomén Gōnghuì Liánhé Zǒng Huì
Yue: Cantonese
- Yale Romanization: Oumún Gūngwuih Lyùhnhahp Júng Wuih
- Jyutping: Ou^{3}mun^{4*2} Gung^{1}wui^{6*2} Lyun^{4}hap^{6} Zung^{2} Wui^{6*2}

Abbreviation
- Traditional Chinese: 工聯總會
- Simplified Chinese: 工联总会
Transcriptions
Standard Mandarin
- Hanyu Pinyin: Gōng Lián Zǒng Huì
Yue: Cantonese
- Yale Romanization: Gūng Lyùhn Júng Wuih
- Jyutping: Gung^{1} Lyun^{4} Zung^{2} Wui^{6*2}

Portuguese name
- Portuguese: Federação das Associações dos Operários de Macau

The Macau Federation of Trade Unions (MFTU) (Note: Chinese: 澳門工會聯合總會, abbr. 工聯總會; Portuguese: Federação das Associações dos Operários de Macau, abbr. FAOM) is a pro-Beijing, leftist, labour and political group in Macau. It is the largest and most influential labour group in the city, with over 50,000 members in 43 associated trade unions. Presided by Ho Sut Heng and chaired by Lee Chong Cheng, it currently holds three seats in the Legislative Assembly.

== History ==
The MFTU is one of the three major pro-Beijing organisations which have dominated politics in Macau since the 1999 handover, the other two being the Macau Chinese Chamber of Commerce and the General Union of Neighbourhood Associations of Macau.

Four members of the MFTU were elected or appointed to the Legislative Assembly in the 2021 legislative election. They were Lam Lon Wai, Lei Chan U, Ella Lei Cheng I, and Leong Sun Iok.

== Election results ==
Election	Votes	%	GC seats	FC seats	Total seats	+/−
1992	6,543	23.75	2	2	4 / 23	—N/a
1996	10,525	14.52	1	2	3 / 23	▼1
2001	12,990	16.04	2	2	4 / 27	▲1
2005	16,596	13.29	2	2	4 / 29	0
2009	21,098	14.88	2	2	4 / 29	0
2013	11,960	8.16	1	2	3 / 33	▼1
2017	16,696	9.67	2	2	4 / 33	▲1
2021	23,761	17.99	2	2	4 / 33	0
2025	27,431	16.91	2	1	3 / 33	▼1

== Elected members ==
- Tong Chi Kin, 1992–2001
- Fernando Chui, 1992–1996
- Leong Iok Wa, 2001–2005
- Kwan Tsui Hang, 2005–present
- Lee Chong Cheng, 2009–2013

== Gallery ==
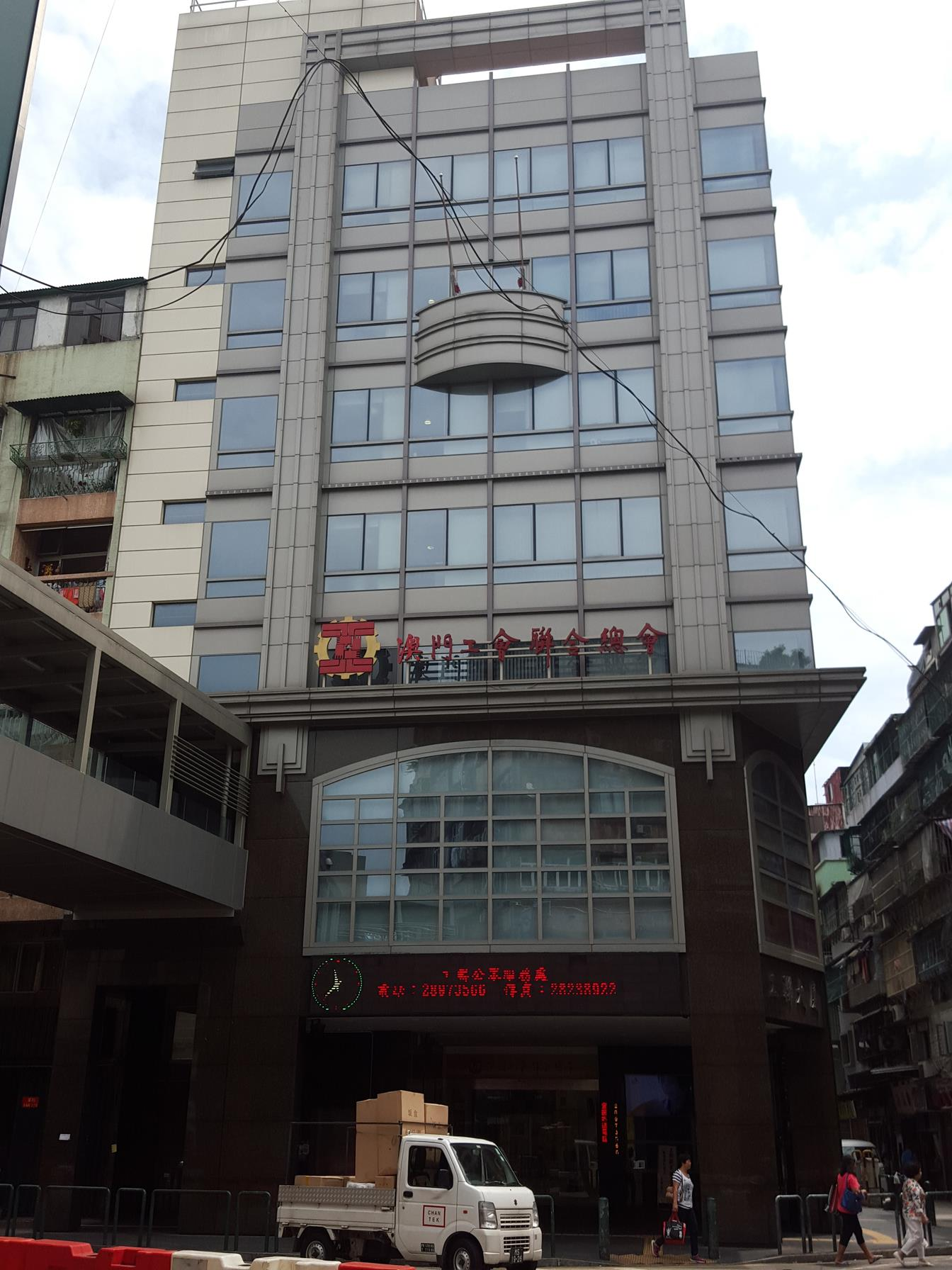
MFTU headquarters

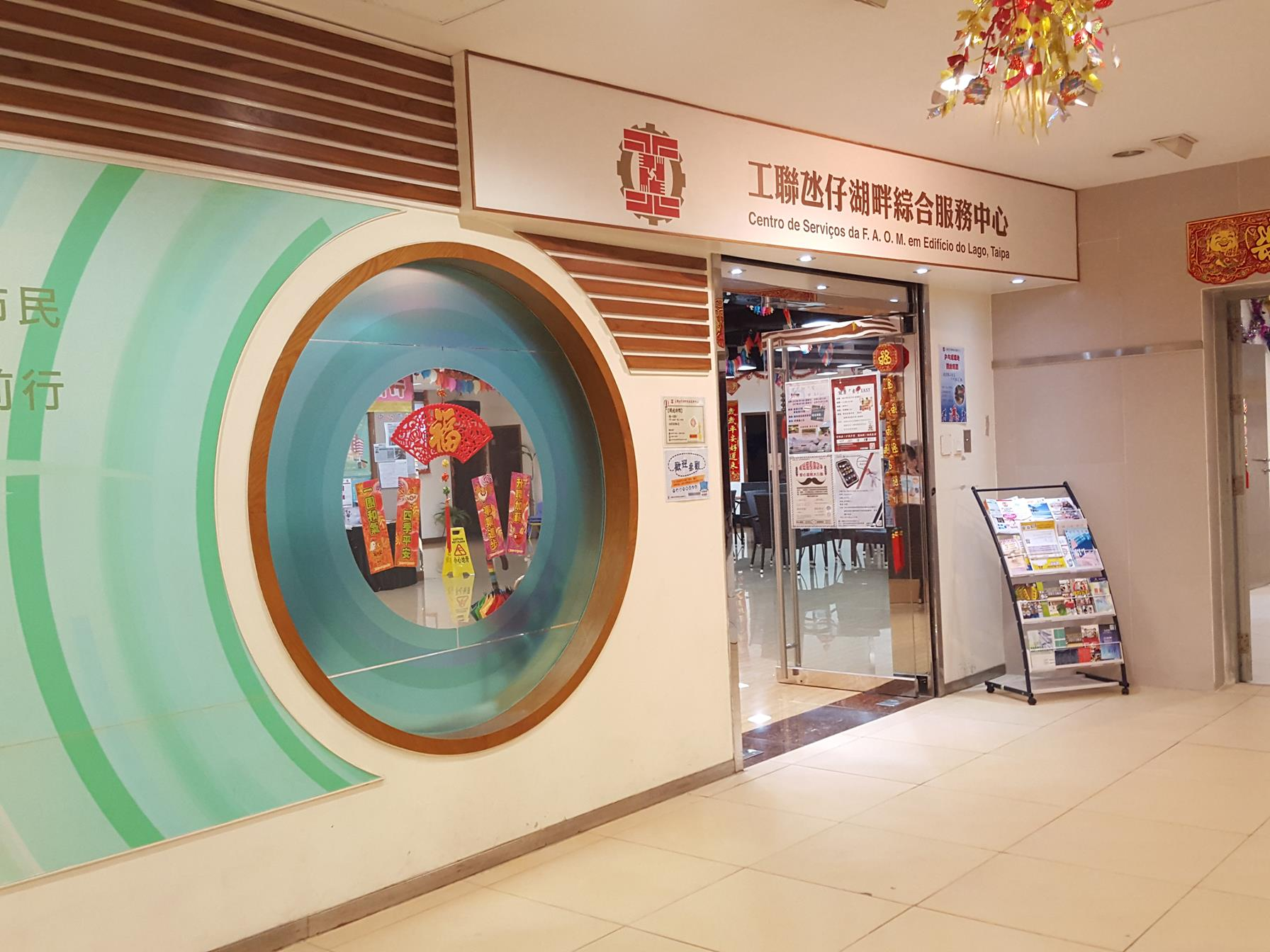
An MFTU service centre inside the Edifício do Lago building in Taipa

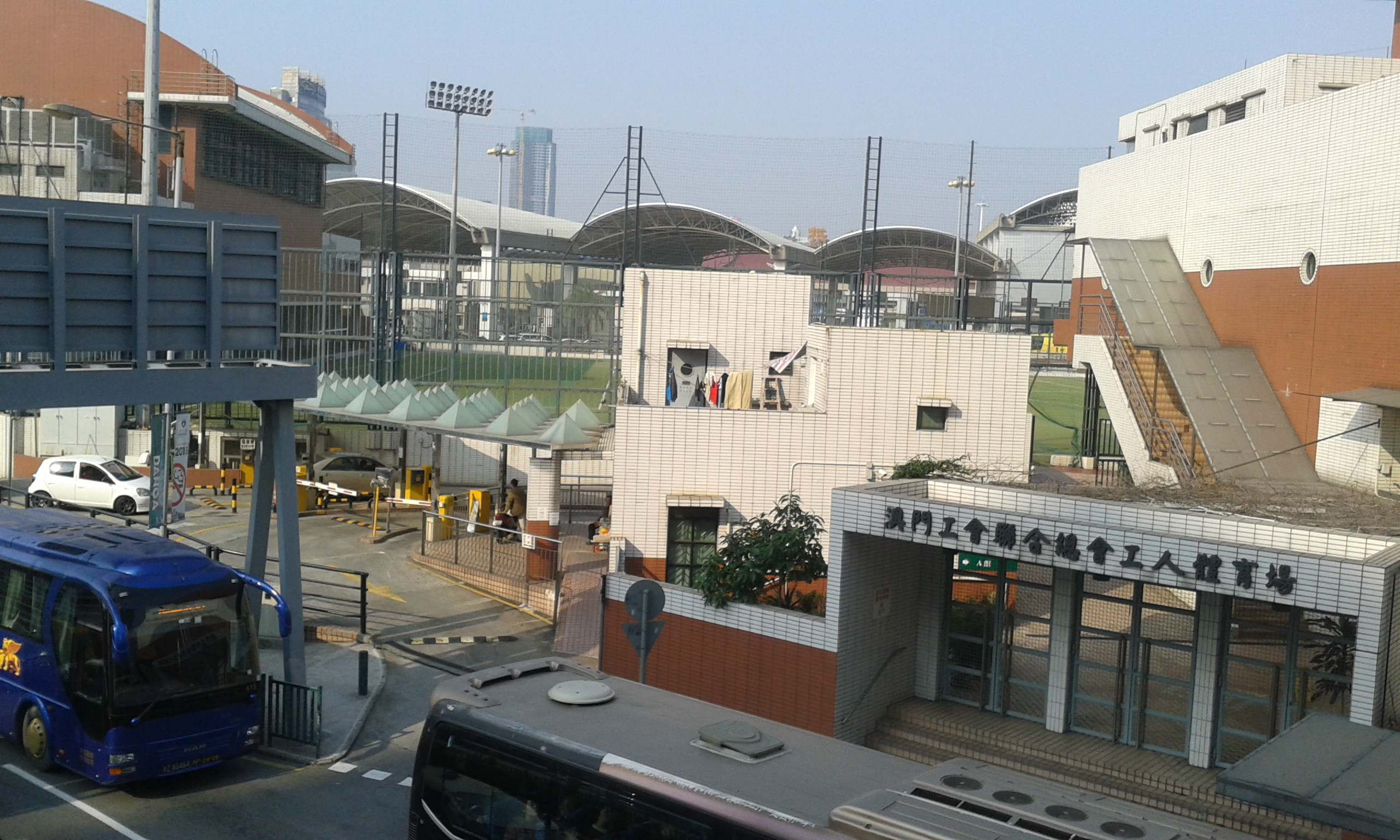
An MFTU-owned "workers' stadium" near the border with mainland China

== See also ==
- Hong Kong Federation of Trade Unions, equivalent organisation in Hong Kong
