= General Union for the Good of Macau =

The General Union for the Good of Macau (Chinese: 愛澳聯盟; Portuguese: União Geral para o Bem-querer de Macau) was a political party-like civic group in Macau. In the 2005 legislative election, the group won 6.8% of the popular vote and 1 out of 12 popular elected seats. The group had already cancelled the registration with the authorities.

== Elected members ==
- Fong Chi-keong 2001–2017 (directly elected members from 2005 to 2009)

== See also ==
- Politics of Macau
