= Beatriz Amélia Alves de Sousa Oliveira Basto da Silva =

Portuguese historian and politician

Beatriz Basto da Silva
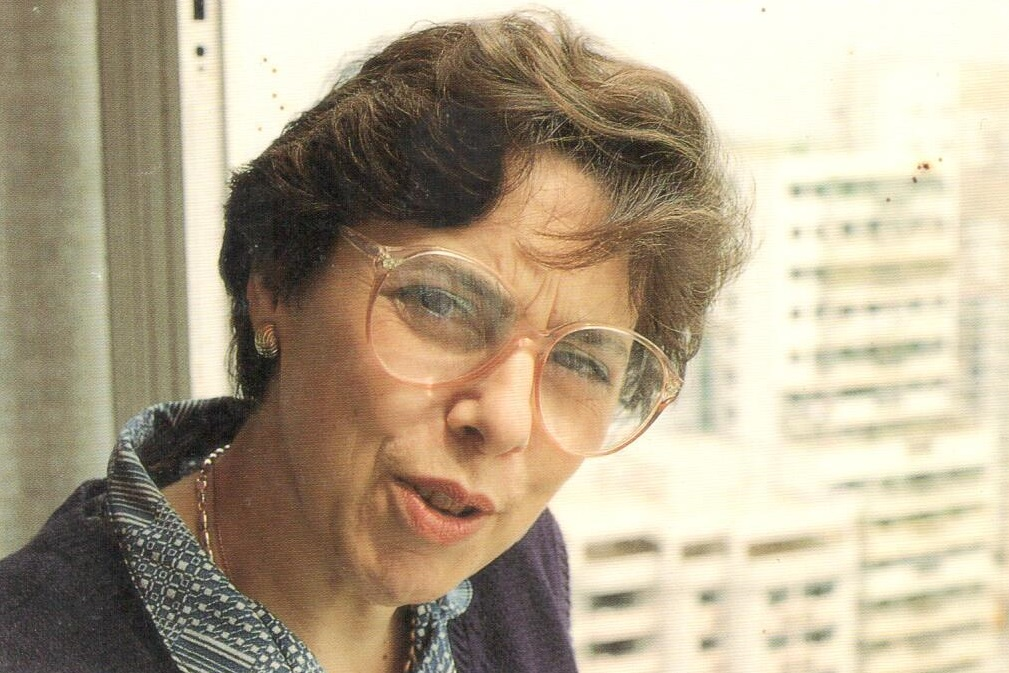
- Born: 2 March 1944 (age 82); Anadia, Portugal
- Education: University of Coimbra
- Spouse: João Bosco Basto da Silva

Beatriz Amélia Alves de Sousa Oliveira Basto da Silva (born 1944) is a historian and former legislator.

== Education and career ==
Basto da Silva was born in Anadia, Portugal in 1944. She majored in history at the University of Coimbra with the thesis of Historiografia - o Conceito de História em António Caetano do Amaral, 'Historiography - The Concept of History in Antônio Caetano do Amaral'.

In Macau since 1970, she taught secondary school history and was selected to teach Macau history at the Magistrates Training Centre.

She was integrated, upon invitation from the Macau Government, to the Territorial Commission for the Portuguese Discoveries Commemoration. She served as deputy for the 5th Legislature of the Legislative Assembly of Macau and integrated the Management Council of the Macau Foundation, where she retired from public service.

Belonged to various Macau associations, such as the Associação Para a Instrução dos Macaenses (APIM), Santa Casa da Misericórdia and "Asianostra/ Estudo de Culturas". She is a correspondent academic member of the Portuguese Society of History, a member of the International Archive Council, and a member of the Sociedade de Geografia de Lisboa.

She served as director of the Primary Mastership (where she lectured about the history of Macau, and was author of the respective program) and director of the Macau Historical Archive, since its foundation in 1979, until 1984.

Basto da Silva has had several articles published and participated in several conferences. She was a consultant for the TV documentary series "O Ocidente no Oriente", produced by Macau TDM.

In July 1997, Basto da Silva was given the Medal of Cultural Merit by the Macau government.

== Books ==
- Elementos da História de Macau (published by Direcção dos Serviços de Educação e Juventude Macau - EDU - 1986)
- Insígnias de Macau - Estudo (published by Leal Senado de Macau, 1986)
- Malaca: o Futuro no Passado e Em Malaca Redescobrir Portugal (both published by EDU, em 1989)
- Cronologia da História de Macau (five volumes) (published by Direcção dos Serviços de Educação e Juventude, Macau, 1992 - 1998)
- Emigração de Cules - Dossier Macau, 1851 - 1994 (published by Fundação Oriente, Macau, 1994)
- Silêncios (published by Mar Oceano, Macau, 1996)

== Researches and papers ==
- "Edições de Os Lusíadas existentes em Macau"
- "Macau e o Sião no séc. XVII"
- "Várias Epístolas - um perfil: D. Alexandre Gouveia, Bispo de Pequim"
- "Rivalidade Luso-Holandesa entre a Índia e Macau, nos séculos XVI e XVII"
- "O Padre Visitador Valignano, S.J. e o IV Centenário da Imprensa de Caracteres Móveis em Macau" (Revista de Cultura, nº6)
- "A Presença Portuguesa no Oriente" (CTT, 1989)
- "Heranças" (nº especial do Grupo Cultural de Macau na sua deslocação a Goa, Dez., 1990)
- "A Identidade Macaense" (Via Latina, Coimbra, 1991)
- "Malaca, a opulenta" (Revista Macau, nº 39, 1991)
- "Ponto de Encontro - Ponto de Partida - um Ponto Importante: Macau" (Portugal Turismo, nº4, VI série, Lisboa, 1990)
- "Macau - Um Sinal da Europa nas Relações Sino-Japonesas do Século XVI" (ed. Fundação Macau, em chinês, 1994)
- "Macaenses Who are they? A problem of identity" (Boletim de Estudos de Macau, Fundação Macau - Universidade de Macau, 1993 - em inglês e chinês)
- "Relações pluricomunitárias no Micro-Espaço: Macau" (in Seminário Internacional da Fundação Transcultural, Macau, 1993)
- "Viagens Portuguesas à Ásia e Japão no Período Renascentista" (in Tóquio, 1993, editado em 1994 em inglês e japonês)
- "Dª Juliana Dias da Costa - Uma cristã na Corte Mogol - Século XVIII" (Comunicação ao Congresso Internacional "O Rosto Feminino na Expansão Portuguesa", Lisboa, 1994).

== Conferences ==
- Participated in a communication about "O Museu de Macau, uma referência para o futuro" at the "Ocidente e Extremo Oriente, Cultura Musical e Espírito" International Symposium, delivered from Lagos to Guimarães, between October the 3rd and 7th, 1997.
- Participated as speaker, "O Ministério Público - Alguns Aspectos Históricos", at the "O Ministério Público e a Sociedade" symposium, organized in Macau, on February the 20th and 21st, 1998.
- Participated as speaker, "Caminhos para uma Antropologia Recíproca", at the "O Culto a S. Gonçalo de Amarante" international conference in S. Paulo - Brasil - between September the 24th and 27th, 1999.
- Commissioner of the expo "Vida e Obra de Monsenhor Manuel Teixeira" and coordinator of the photo-bio-bibliographic album published by "Livros do Oriente". The expo took place at Lisbon, 1999 and travelled to Freixo-de-Espada-a-Cinta, where the Commissioner held a conference about "Monsenhor Teixeira e a Missão Portuguesa de Macau".
- Spoke at the "Portugal - Brasil - 500 Anos de História" conference about "Contactos entre Macau e o Brasil - Uma amostragem", at the Academia Portuguesa da História headquarters, Lisbon, May the 2nd, 2000.
- Presented a photography expo from Carmo Correia "Sentir Macau - O Património", at the Fundação Oriente, Lisbon, 2012.
- Made two conferences in Lisbon on the 1st centenary memory of Mons. Teixeira; one at the Fundação Oriente and another at CCCM, both in 2012.
- Made a conference about the same topic, due to the same reason, in Macau, at IPOR, 2012.
- Gave an Open Class at the Senior University of Marinha Grande "Encontro de Culturas", 2009 and at the School nº 19 in Coimbra ("O Quotidiano de Macau", 2010).
- Integrated the discussion/debate panel on "Identidade Macaense" at the Letters Faculty of University of Coimbra - Geography Department.
- Presented a book from A.M. Couto Viana at the S.G.L., 2002.
- Presented the book "Memórias do Romanceiro de Macau" from J.J. Monteiro at IIST, Macau, 2013.
- Hosted the "Encontro de Fim-de-Tarde" at the Fundação Rui Cunha (Macau, 23 Jan. 2014) regarding "As Crianças na Expansão Portuguesa".
