= Appointed members of the Legislative Assembly of Macau =

The appointed members of the Legislative Assembly of Macau are members of the Legislative Assembly of Macau who are appointed by the chief executive (and governor during the colonial era). They are not affiliated to any political party and do not represent any constituency but they are generally loyal to the chief executive. There are currently seven appointed members in the Legislative Assembly.

== List of Appointed members after 1999 ==
=== 6th Legislative Assembly (2017–present) ===
Members appointed by the Chief Executive "Fernando" Chui Sai On

- Ma Chi Seng
- Pang Chuan
- Wu Chou Kit
- Lao Chi Ngai
- Fong Ka Chio
- Iau Teng Pio
- Chan Wa Keong

=== 5th Legislative Assembly (2013–2017) ===
Members appointed by the Chief Executive "Fernando" Chui Sai On

- Fong Chi Keong
- Vong Hin Fai
- "Dominic" Sio Chi Wai
- Ma Chi Seng
- Tsui Wai Kwan
- "Tommy" Lau Veng Seng
- Tong Io Cheng

=== 4th Legislative Assembly (2009–2013) ===
Members appointed by the Chief Executive "Fernando" Chui Sai On

- José Chui Sai Peng
- Ho Sio Kam
- "Tommy" Lau Veng Seng
- "Dominic" Sio Chi Wai
- Tong Io Cheng
- Tsui Wai Kwan
- Vong Hin Fai

=== 3rd Legislative Assembly (2005–2009) ===
Members appointed by the Chief Executive Edmund Ho Hau Wah

- Lei Pui Lam
- Sam Chan Io
- Tsui Wai Kwan
- "José" Chui Sai Peng
- Philip Xavier
- Ieong Tou Hong
- Lao Pun Lap

=== 2nd Legislative Assembly (2001–2005) ===
Members appointed by the Chief Executive Edmund Ho Hau Wah

- Stanley Au Chong Kit
- Philip Xavier
- Ho Teng Iat
- José Manuel de Oliveira Rodrigues
- Cheong Vai Kei
- Vong Hin Fai
- Tsui Wai Kwan

=== 1st Legislative Assembly (1999–2001) ===
Members appointed by the Chief Executive Edmund Ho Hau Wah (1999–2001)

- João Baptista Manuel Leão
- Ho Teng Iat
- Stanley Au Chong Kit
- Philip Xavier
- Vong Hin Fai
- Cheong Vai Kei
- José Manuel de Oliveira Rodrigues

== List of Appointed members before 1999 ==
=== 7th Legislative Assembly (1996–1999) ===
Members appointed by the Governor Vasco Joaquim Rocha Vieira

- José João de Deus Rodrigues do Rosário
- Raimundo Arrais do Rosário
- Joaquim Morais Alves
- Joaquim Jorge Perestrelo Neto Valente
- José Manuel de Oliveira Rodrigues
- António José Félix Pontes
- Rui António Craveiro Afonso

=== 6th Legislative Assembly (1992–1996) ===
Members appointed by the Governor Vasco Joaquim Rocha Vieira

- José João de Deus Rodrigues do Rosário
- Raimundo Arrais do Rosário
- Beatriz Amélia Alves de Sousa Oliveira Basto da Silva
- Joaquim Jorge Perestrelo Neto Valente
- António Correia
- António José Félix Pontes
- Rui António Craveiro Afonso

=== 5th Legislative Assembly (1988–1992) ===
Members appointed by the Governor Carlos Montez Melancia

- Ana Maria Fortuna de Siqueira Basto Perez
- Anabela Fátima Xavier Sales Ritchie
- Joaquim Jorge Perestrelo Neto Valente
- Philip Xavier
- Rui António Craveiro Afonso

=== 4th Legislative Assembly (1984–1988) ===
Members appointed by the Governor Vasco de Almeida e Costa

- Carlos Cavaleiro Gonçalves Sanches
- Hoi Sai Un
- Luís Filipe Ferreira Simões
- Pedro Ló da Silva
- Rui António Craveiro Afonso

=== 3rd Legislative Assembly (1980–1984) ===
Members appointed by the Governor Vasco de Almeida e Costa

- Ho Yin
- Kwong Bing Yun
- Eduardo Jorge Armas Tavares da Silva
- Carlos Cavaleiro Gonçalves Sanches
- Ana Maria Fortuna de Siqueira Basto Perez

=== 2nd Legislative Assembly (1976–1980) ===
Members appointed by the Governor Nuno Viriato Tavares de Melo Egídio

- Ho Yin
- Kwong Bing Yun
- Mário Figueira Isaac
- Anabela Fátima Xavier Sales Ritchie
- Ana Maria Fortuna de Siqueira Basto Perez

== See also ==
- Nominated Member of Parliament
- Geographical constituency (Macau)
- Functional constituency (Macau)
