= Kou Hoi In =

Elected Official of Macau

- 高開賢
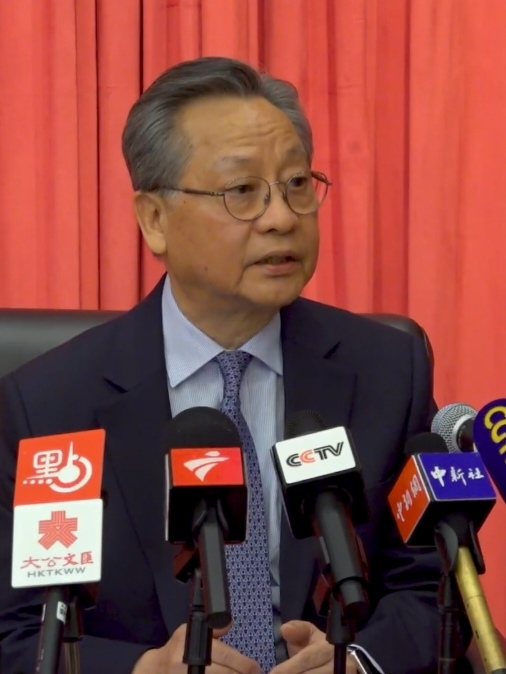
- Kou in 2024

Member of the Standing Committee of the National People's Congress
- Incumbent
- Assumed office 11 March 2023
- Preceded by: Ho Iat Seng

President of the Legislative Assembly
- In office 17 July 2019 – 15 October 2025
- Vice President: Chui Sai Cheong
- Preceded by: Ho Iat-seng
- Succeeded by: Cheong Weng Chon

Member of the National People’s Congress
- Incumbent
- Assumed office 2003
- Constituency: Macau

Personal details
- Born: 1953 (age 72–73)
- Party: General Union of Neighbourhood Associations of Macau

Chinese name
- Traditional Chinese: 高開賢
- Simplified Chinese: 高开贤
Transcriptions
Yue: Cantonese
- Jyutping: Gou1 Hoi1 Jin4

Portuguese name
- Portuguese: Kou Hoi In

Kou Hoi In (Chinese: 高開賢, born 1953) is a Macau politician who has been the President of the Legislative Assembly of Macau since 2019, and a member of the assembly since 1991. He has also been a member of the National People's Congress since 2003, and represents Macau on the standing committee of the 14th National People's Congress.

== Early life and education ==
Kou Hoi In was born in 1953.

== Career ==
During Portuguese rule of Macau Kou became a member of the Legislative Assembly of Macau in 1991, and is the longest serving currently-sitting member of the assembly. He was a member of General Union of Neighbourhood Associations of Macau in the 1990s. Kou will not seek reelection to the assembly in 2025.

Ho Iat Seng stepped down as President of the assembly in order to run for Chief Executive of Macau. Kou was elected to succeed him as president with 90.6% support in the assembly on 17 July 2019. He was reelected after defeating José Chui Sai Peng by a vote of 32 to 1 on 16 October 2021.

In 2003, Kou became a member of the National People's Congress. On 11 March 2023, Kou was elected by a vote of 2,842 to 90 as Macau's member on the standing committee of the 14th National People's Congress and is Macau's only representative on the standing committee. Ho, who resigned from the position in 2019, was Macau's previous representative on the standing committee.

Sam Hou Fai's candidacy for chief executive in the 2024 election was supported by Kou.

Kou is the vice-chair of the Macau Chinese Chamber of Commerce.

== Personal life ==
The Silver Lotus Medal of Honour has been given to Kou.

== Works cited ==
=== News ===
- "64pc vote in Macau elections". South China Morning Post. 23 September 1996. Archived from the original on 5 July 2025.
- "Elections to feature new candidates as veteran lawmakers step down". Macau Daily Times. 24 June 2025. Archived from the original on 5 July 2025.
- "Kou elected president of legislature with over 90 pct of votes". Macau Post Daily. 18 July 2019. Archived from the original on 5 July 2025.
- "Kou Hoi In becomes sole Macau member of NPC Standing Committee". Macau Business Daily. 11 March 2023. Archived from the original on 5 July 2025.
- "Kou Hoi In has been elected to the NPC's standing committee". Macau News. 13 March 2023. Archived from the original on 5 July 2025.
- "Kou Hoi In reelected Legislative Assembly president". Macau Business Daily. 16 October 2021. Archived from the original on 5 July 2025.
- "Public still has many demands, expectations for a better life – Sam Hou Fai". Macau Business Daily. 1 September 2024. Archived from the original on 5 July 2025.

=== Web ===
- "Resumo Curricular dos Deputados à Assembleia Legislativa da Região Administrativa Especial de Macau". Legislative Assembly of Macau. Archived from the original on 5 July 2025.
- "President of the Legislative Assembly Kou Hoi In". Macau. Archived from the original on 5 July 2025.
