= Macau Business Daily =

- Type: English daily newspaper
- Founded: April 2, 2012
- Ceased publication: 2017
- Headquarters: Macau
- Website: macaubusinessdaily.com

Macau Business Daily (shortened as MBD; simplified Chinese: 澳门商业日报; traditional Chinese: 澳門商業日報), also known as Business Daily, was an English-language daily newspaper launched by De Ficção Multimedia Projects on April 2, 2012.

Macau Business Daily was Macao's main English-language daily newspaper, it ceased publication in 2017.
