= Macau Chinese Chamber of Commerce =

Business association in Macau

- 澳門中華總商會; Associação Comercial de Macau
- Formation: January 8, 1913; 113 years ago
- Website: acm.org.mo

The Macau Chinese Chamber of Commerce (Chinese: 澳門中華總商會; Portuguese: Associação Comercial de Macau, abbr. ACM) is a business association in Macau. It was established on 8 January 1913 as the Macau Chamber of Commerce and changed to its current name in 1916.

== Origins ==
Founded in the early 20th century at the encouragement of the Qing government, the Macau Chamber of Commerce was established with the approval of the Portuguese authorities. It sought to serve the business interests of Chinese people in Portuguese territory until its founding charter was revoked in 1911 by the Portuguese colonial administration. Chinese businessmen, dissatisfied with the lack of representation in Macau, proposed an independent business association which was later approved on 14 December 1912 and formally established on 8 January 1913 as the Macao Chinese Chamber of Commerce.

== Recent history ==
The ACM is one of the three major pro-Beijing organisations which have dominated politics in Macau since the 1999 handover, the other two being the Macau Federation of Trade Unions and the General Union of Neighbourhood Associations of Macau.
