= Ho Teng Iat =

Macanese businesswoman and politician

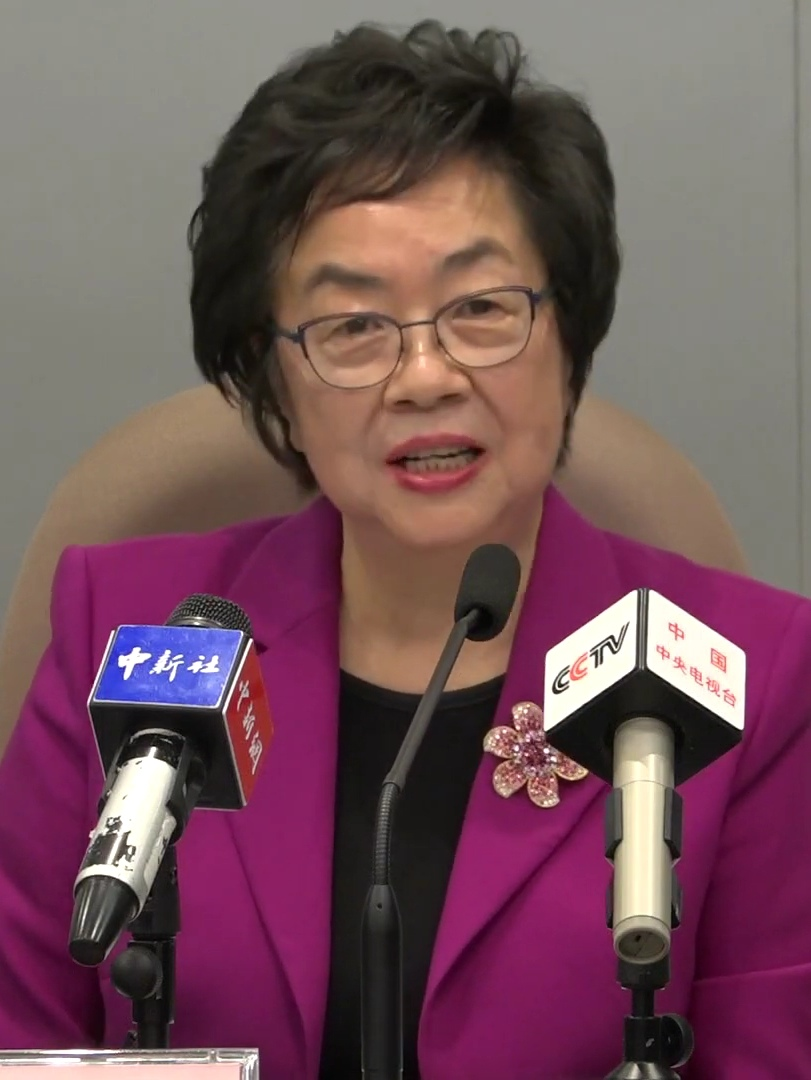
Ho Teng Iat in 2019

Ho Teng Iat (Chinese: 賀定一) (born 1950 in Hangzhou, Zhejiang, China) is a Macau businesswoman and politician. She was a member of the Legislative Assembly of Macau. She is the daughter of Ho Tin (Chinese: 賀田), the founder of Sociedade Industrial Ho Tin S.A.R.L, and she acts as the managing director and CEO of her father's company. She is also the vice-president of Industrial Association of Macao.
