= Antonio Ng =

Macau politician

António Ng Ng Kuok Cheong
- 吳國昌
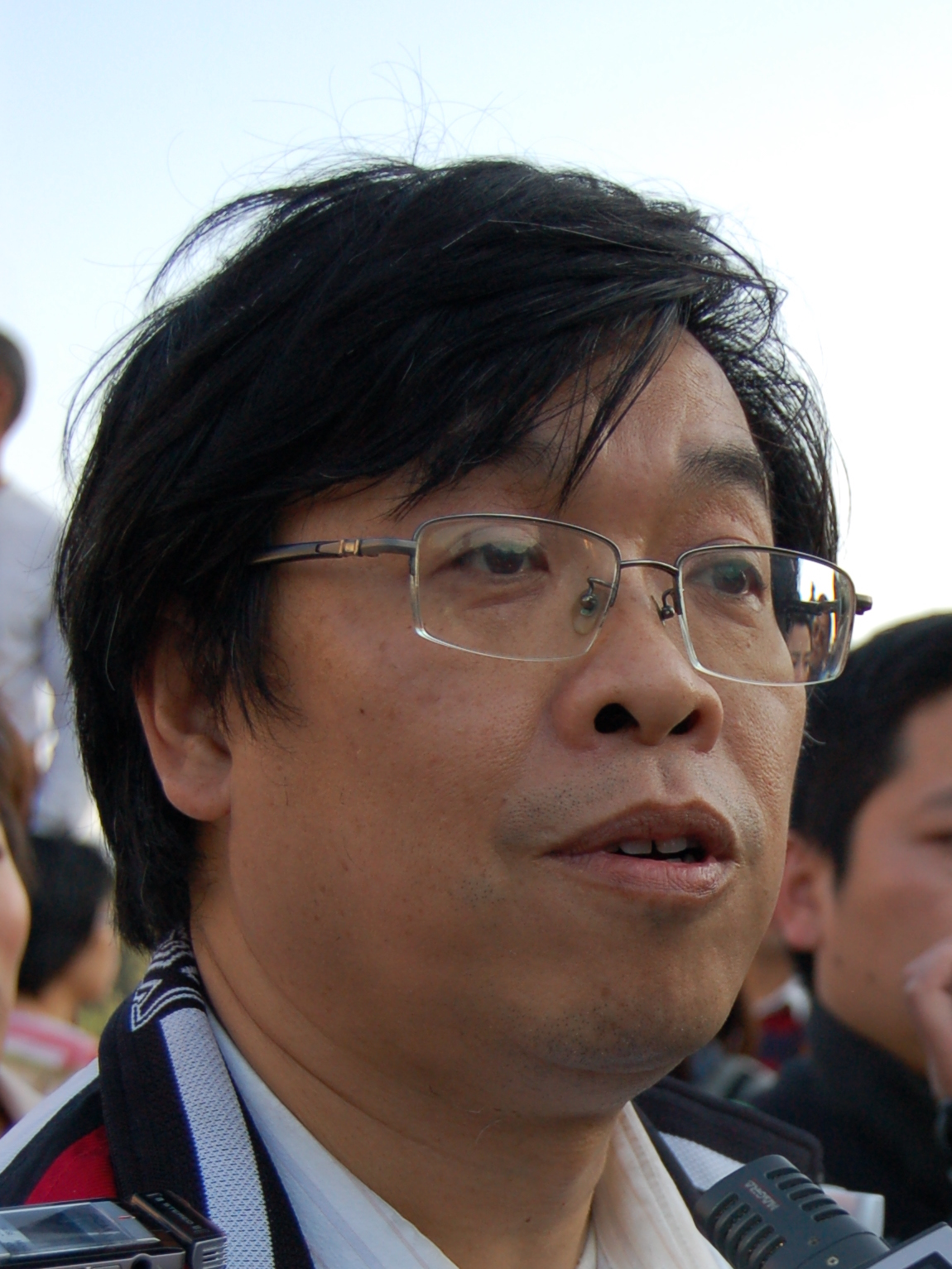
- Antonio Ng at the December 20, 2008 demonstration

Member of the Legislative Assembly
- In office 30 September 1992 – 15 October 2021
- Constituency: Macau (Directly elected)

Personal details
- Born: September 26, 1957 (age 69) Nanhai, Guangdong, China
- Party: New Democratic Macau Association

Antonio Ng
- Traditional Chinese: 吳國昌
- Simplified Chinese: 吴国昌
Transcriptions
Standard Mandarin
- Hanyu Pinyin: Wú Guóchāng
Yue: Cantonese
- Jyutping: ng4 gwok3 coeng1

António Ng Kuok Cheong (Chinese: 吳國昌; born September 26, 1957) is a politician who was a member in the Macau Legislative Assembly, returned by direct election. He was the founding chairman of the pro-democratic political party New Macau Association. He is also the leader of the political pressure group Union for Democracy Development. Ng has been a major figure in the Macau democracy movement and is one of the three pro-democratic legislators in the Assembly.

After his graduation from Yuet Wah College, Macau, Ng obtained his undergraduate degree in economics at Chinese University of Hong Kong. Once an employee in a Chinese bank in the early 1990s, Ng lost the job due to political pressure from Beijing.

== Election results ==
Year	Candidate	Hare quota	Mandate	List Votes	List Pct
1992	António Ng (ANMD)	3,412	No.4/8	3,412	12.39%
1996	António Ng (AMDP)	6,331	No.6/8	6,331	8.73%
2001	António Ng (AMDP)	8,481	No.1/10	16,961	20.95%
2005	António Ng (AMDP)	11,745	No.1/12	23,489	18.80%
2009	António Ng (APMD)	8,212	No.3/12	16,424	11.58%
2013	António Ng (APMD)	10,986	No.8/14	10,986	7.50%
2017	António Ng (APMD)	10,079	No.9/14	10,079	5.84%

== See also ==
- Politics of Macau
