= Association for Democracy and Social Well-Being of Macau =

Political party in Macau

The Association for Democracy and Social Well-Being of Macau (Chinese: 澳門民主民生協進會; Portuguese: Associação pela Democracia e Bem-estar Social de Macau) is a political party in the Chinese Special Administrative Region of Macau. Macau is a state in which political parties do not play a role. Though some civic groups put forward lists at the elections and might be considered parties. At the 2005 Macanese legislative election, the group won 3.5% of the popular vote and 0 out of 12 popular elected seats.

== See also ==
- Politics of Macau
