= General Union of Neighbourhood Associations of Macau =

- Chinese name: 澳門街坊會聯合總會
- Portuguese name: União Geral das Associações dos Moradores de Macau
- President: Ng Siu-lai
- Chairman: Chan Ka-leong
- Founded: 30 December 1983
- Registered: 2 June 1984
- Newspaper: Macau Residents
- Membership (2021): 40,000+
- Political position: Left-wing
- Regional affiliation: Pro-Beijing
- Colors: Blue
- Legislative Assembly: 2 / 33

Website
- www.ugamm.org.mo

The General Union of Neighbourhood Associations of Macau (Chinese: 澳門街坊會聯合總會; Portuguese: União Geral das Associações dos Moradores de Macau), sometimes shortened to the GUNA or the Neighbourhood Union (Chinese: 街坊總會 or 街總), is a pro-Beijing political party in Macau that is represented in the Legislative Assembly.

== History ==
The General Union of Neighbourhood Associations of Macau (GUNA) was formed on 30 December 1983 with a call for unity among Macanese following social changes brought by the Chinese Government's reform policies. The GUNA provided services ranging from child to elderly care as well as education and basic community services. It was regarded as part of the traditional faction within the pro-Beijing camp.

The GUNA was officially registered on 2 June 1984. It first fielded candidates in 1988 legislative election and won. Electoral alliances were then formed with other pro-Beijing parties under the name of the Progress Promotion Union which has fielded candidates since the 1992 legislative election.

The GUNA is one of the three major pro-Beijing organizations which have dominated politics in Macau since the 1999 handover; the other two are the Macau Chinese Chamber of Commerce and the Macau Federation of Trade Unions.

== Leadership ==
The leadership of the 17th Council and Supervisory Board members consists of:

- Leader: Ng Siu-lai (吳小麗)
- Chairperson: Chan Ka-leong (陳家良)
- Secretary-general: Mo Wei-cheng (莫偉成)

== Electoral performance ==
Logo of Union for Promoting Progress

GUNA formed the party list of Union for Promoting Progress (Chinese: 群力促進會; Portuguese: União Promotora para o Progresso, UNIPRO) for legislative elections. In the 2017 legislative election, the party won 12.65 percent of the popular vote and 2 of the 14 popularly elected seats.

Election	Number of popular votes	% of popular votes	GC seats	FC seats	EC seats	Total seats	+/−
1992	6,956	25.25	2	0	0	2 / 23	—
1996	11,045	15.23	2	0	0	2 / 23	0
2001	11,276	13.92	2	0	0	2 / 27	0
2005	11,989	9.60	2	0	0	2 / 29	0
2009	14,044	9.90	1	0	0	1 / 29	1▼
2013	15,815	10.79	2	0	0	2 / 33	1▲
2017	12,340	7.15	1	0	0	1 / 33	1▼
2021	15,102	11.43	2	0	0	2 / 33	1▲
2025							

== Elected members ==
- Leong Heng Teng, 2001–2009
- Iong Weng Ian, 2001–2009
- Ho Ion Sang, 2009–present
- Wong Kit Cheng, 2013–present
