= Convergence for Development =

Political party in Macau

The Convergence for Development (Portuguese: Convergência para o Desenvolvimento; Chinese: 繁榮澳門同盟; CODEM) is a political party in the Chinese Special Administrative Region of Macau. Macau is a state in which political parties do not play a role. Though some civic groups put forward lists at the elections and might be considered parties. In the 2005 Macanese legislative election, the group won 4.87% of the popular vote and 1 out of 12 popular elected seats.

== Elected members ==
- David Chow Kam Fai (1996–2009)
- Jorge Manuel Fão (2001-2005)

== See also ==
- Politics of Macau
