= David Chow (politician) =

Macau politician

David Chow Kam Fai (Chinese: 周錦輝; born 1950 in Hong Kong) is a Macau businessman and politician. His businesses are involved in the tourism, entertainment and gambling industries. He was a member of the Legislative Assembly of Macau (ran under the name of Convergence for Development) and is the CEO of Macau Landmark and Macau Fisherman's Wharf Investment Co Ltd. He is also Honored Consul of the Republic of Cape Verde to Macau SAR.

His wife, Melinda Chan, is the founder of Macau Zhuhai Communal Association, a major political association in Macau.

== Link ==
- Official website of Chow Kam Fai
