= Politics of Macau =

Politics of Macau takes place in the framework of a multi-party presidential system dominated by the People's Republic of China. It includes the legislature, the judiciary, the government, and a politically constrained multi-party system. Executive power is exercised by the government, led by the Chief Executive.

== Constitutional role of Macau ==
In accordance with Article 31 of the Constitution of China, Macau is a special administrative region, which provides constitutional guarantees for implementing the policy of "one country, two systems" and the basis for enacting the Basic Law of the Macau Special Administrative Region. Although geographically near Guangdong province, Macau is directly under the authority of the central government of China, which controls the foreign affairs and defence of Macau but otherwise grants the region "a high degree of authority." The Basic Law took force upon the transfer of sovereignty from Portugal on 20 December 1999, and is to remain in effect for at least fifty years (i.e. until 2049).

Macau's seven deputies to the National People's Congress (NPC) are selected by an electoral conference; they attended their first session of the NPC in Beijing in March 2000. Previously, in December 1999, the NPC Standing Committee approved the membership of the NPC Committee for the Basic Law of the Macau Special Administrative Region, chaired by NPC Vice Chairman Qiao Xiaoyang, for a five-year term. Half of the ten members are from Macau, the others from mainland China. Macau also has representation on the National Committee of the Chinese People's Political Consultative Conference.

Relations between the government of Macau and China's central government are typically congenial.

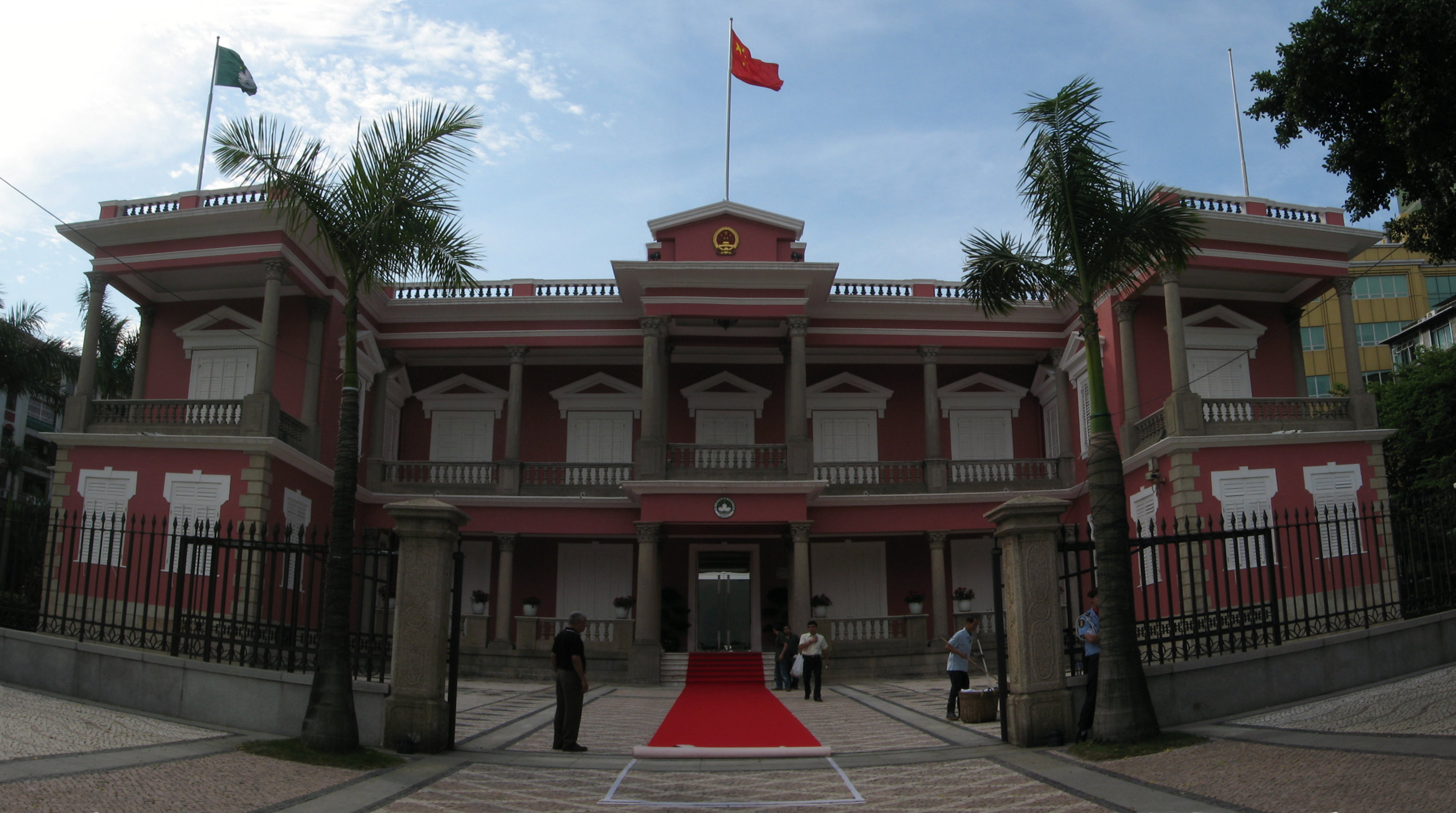
The headquarters of Macau Government

== Head of Government ==
Main office-holders
Office	Name	Party	Since
General Secretary of the Chinese Communist Party (paramount leader)	Xi Jinping	Chinese Communist Party	15 November 2012
President of China (head of state)	Xi Jinping	Chinese Communist Party	14 March 2013
Premier of the State Council (head of central government)	Li Qiang	Chinese Communist Party	11 March 2023
Chief Executive of the Macau SAR (head of region AND head of regional government)	Sam Hou Fai	Non-partisan	20 December 2019

The Chief Executive of Macau is appointed by the People's Republic of China's central government after selection by an election committee, whose members are nominated by corporate bodies. The chief executive appears before a cabinet, the Executive Council, of between 7 and 11 members. The term of office of the chief executive is 5 years, and no individual may serve for more than two consecutive terms. The governor has strong policymaking and executive powers similar to those of a president. These powers are, however, limited from above by the central government in Beijing, to whom the governor reports directly, and from below (to a more limited extent) by the legislature.

In May 1999, Edmund Ho, a community leader and banker, was the first PRC-appointed chief executive of the Macau SAR, having replaced General Rocha Vieira on 20 December 1999. He was elected by the 200-member Chief Executive Selection Committee. Ho, born in Macau in 1955, was the first Chinese person to govern the region since the 1550s. Prior to 20 December 1999, Ho nominated major officials in the new government and carried out other transfer tasks. Ho was re-elected for a second term in 2004 and was succeeded by Fernando Chui in 2009.

The executive branch of the Macau government has the following cabinet departments, each headed by a secretary: Administration and Justice, Economic and Financial Affairs, Security, Social Affairs and Culture, and Transport and Public Works. There also are two commissions, Against Corruption and Audit, and a chief public prosecutor. Upon Macau's reversion to China, the executive offices were moved from Macau Government House temporarily to the Banco Tai Fung.

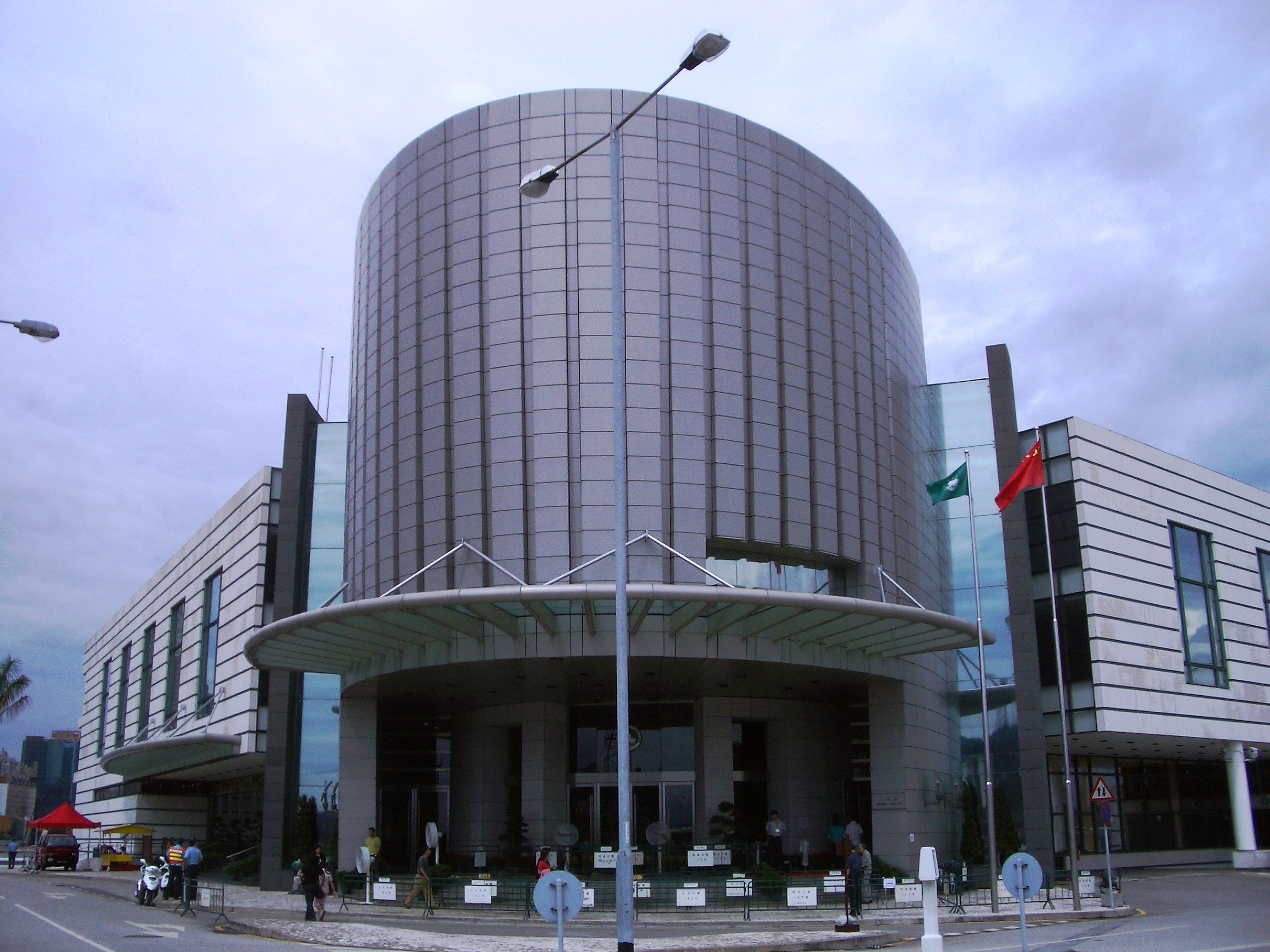
The Legislative Assembly of Macau

== Executive ==
The executive council decides on matters of policy, the introduction of bills to the Legislative Assembly of Macau and the drafting of subordinate legislation. The council consists of 11 members including the chief executive.

=== Cabinet ===
The cabinet consists of 5 secretariats of departments led by a chief:

- Chief of Cabinet (Macau)
- Secretary for Transport and Public Works
- Secretary for Social Affairs and Culture
- Secretary for Security
- Secretary for Economy and Finance
- Secretary for Administration and Justice

=== Principal officials ===
- Commissioner of the Macau Customs Service
- Commissioner of the Unitary Police Service of Macau
- Commissioner Against Corruption
- Procurator General of Macau

== Legislative branch ==
The legislative organ of the territory is the Legislative Assembly, a 33-member body comprising fourteen directly elected members, twelve indirectly elected members representing functional constituencies and seven members appointed by the chief executive. The Legislative Assembly is responsible for general lawmaking, including taxation, the passing of the budget and socioeconomic legislation. Terms are for four years, with annual sessions running from 15 October to 16 August. There are several standing committees in the assembly that perform the following functions: examination and issuance of reports and statements on projects and proposals of law, on resolutions and deliberations, and on proposals of alteration presented to the Legislative Assembly; examination of petitions submitted to the Legislative Assembly; voting on issues as approved in general by the Legislative Assembly General Meeting; and answering questions raised by the president or the General Meeting.

The last election was held in 2017 and the current Legislative Assembly is chaired by its president, businessman Ho Iat Seng (賀一誠), who is assisted by the vice president, Chui Sai Cheong (崔世昌), the elder brother of Chief Executive Fernando Chui Sai On.

== Judiciary ==
The Court of Final Appeal is the court of last resort in the Macau Special Administrative Region.

The legal system is based largely on Portuguese law. The territory has its own independent judicial system, with a high court. Judges are selected by a committee and appointed by the chief executive. Foreign judges may serve on the courts. In July 1999 the chief executive appointed a seven-person committee to select judges for the SAR. Twenty-four judges were recommended by the committee and were then appointed by Mr. Ho. Included are three judges who serve on the Macau SAR's highest court, the Court of Final Appeal (CFA): 39-year-old Sam Hou Fai (who will be chief justice), 32-year-old Chu Kin, and the 46-year-old Viriato Manuel Pinhiero de Lima.

== Political pressure groups and leaders ==
Public political demonstration is rare in Macau.

- Roman Catholic Church (José Lai, bishop)
- Macau Society of Tourism and Entertainment or STDM (Stanley Ho, managing director)
- Union for Democracy Development (Antonio Ng Kuok Cheong, leader)

== Foreign affairs ==
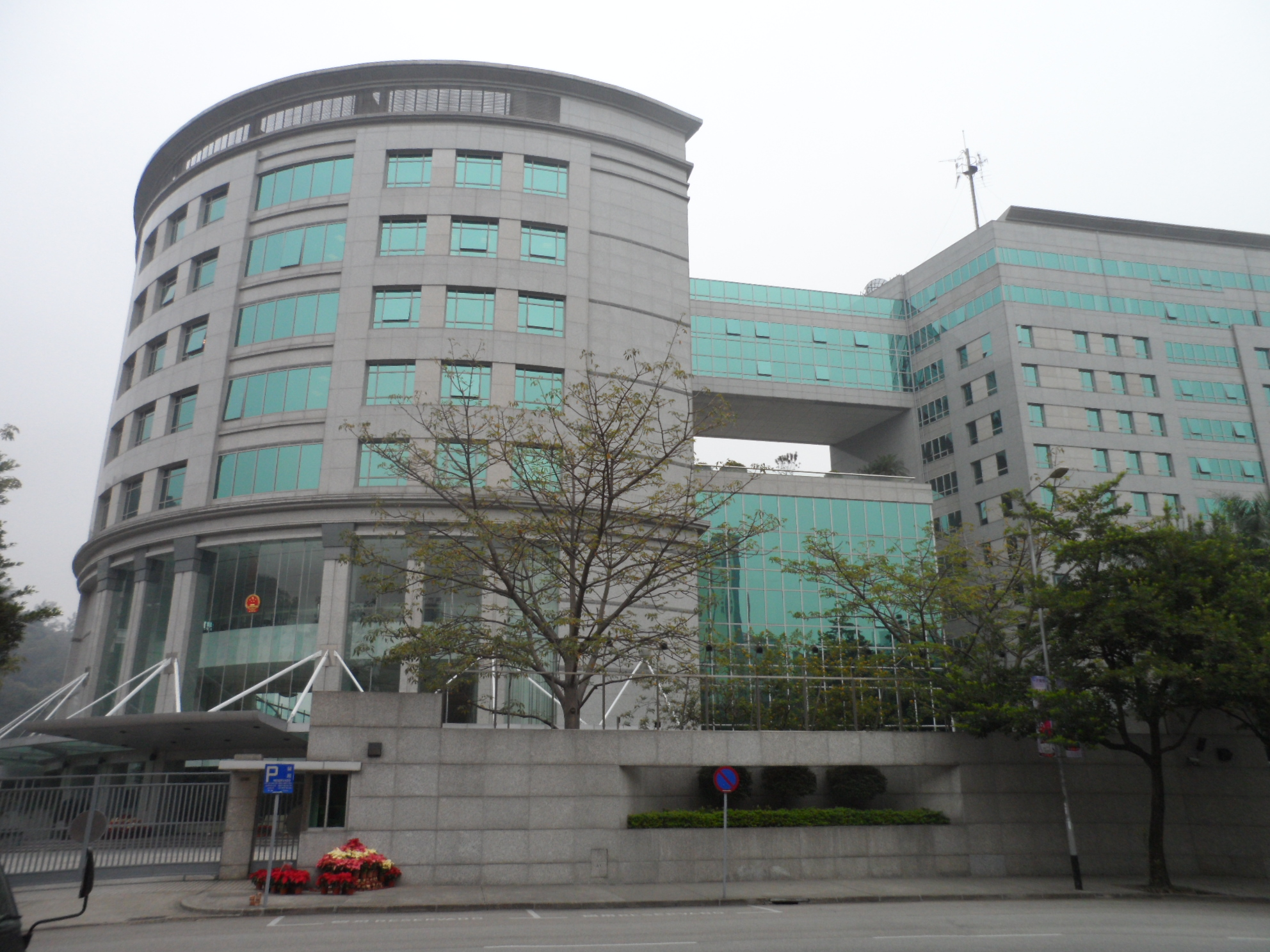
Office of the Commissioner of the Ministry of Foreign Affairs of the People's Republic of China in the Macao Special Administrative Region

The central government in Beijing controls the foreign affairs of Macau. The Office of the Commissioner of the Ministry of Foreign Affairs of the People's Republic of China in the Macao Special Administrative Region opened its office in Macau on 20 December 1999. As a central government agency, the commission interacts with the Macau government in matters of foreign policy. It also processes applications from foreign nations and international organisations wishing to establish consulates or representative offices in Macau. Macau is also authorised to handle some external affairs on its own. These affairs include economic and cultural relations and agreements it concludes with states, regions, and international organisations. In such matters, Macau functions under the name "Macao, China." Macau displays the flag and national emblem of the People's Republic of China but is also authorised to display its own regional flag and emblem. Taiwanese organisations in Macau are allowed to continue operations and are required to abide by the Basic Law.

== International organisation participation ==
CCC, ESCAP (associate), International Maritime Organization (associate), Interpol (subbureau), UNESCO (associate), WMO, WToO (associate), WTrO

== See also ==
- Politics of China
