= Legislative Assembly of Macau =

Parliament of Macau

Coordinates: 22°11′0″N 113°32′23.66″E

Legislative Assembly of the Macao Special Administrative Region 澳門特別行政區立法會 Assembleia Legislativa da Região Administrativa Especial de Macau
- 6th Legislative Assembly

Type
- Type: Unicameral

History
- Founded: 1784; 242 years ago (colonial); 20 December 1999; 26 years ago (MSAR)

Leadership
- President: Cheong Weng Chon since 16 October 2025
- First Secretary: Chan Hong since 30 July 2019
- Second Secretary: Ho Ion Sang since 7 August 2019

Structure
- Seats: 33
- Political groups: Pro-Beijing (30): ACUM (3); UNIPRO (2); UPD (2); UGM (2); AGMM (2); Indirectly elected (12); Appointed (7); Pro-democracy (3): NE (3)

Elections
- First election: 23 September 2001
- Last election: 14 September 2025
- Next election: 2029

Meeting place
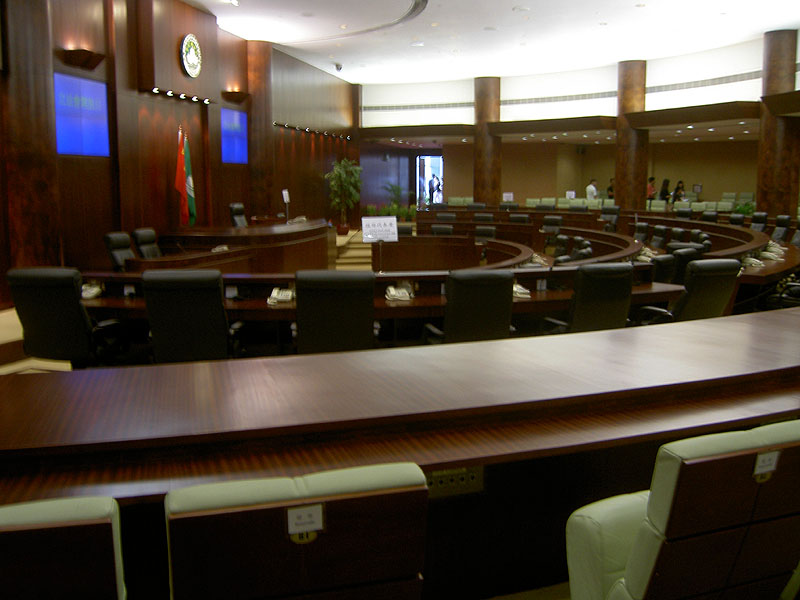
- Macau Legislative Assembly Building, 1 Praça da Assembleia Legislativa, Sé, Macau Special Administrative Region

Website
- al.gov.mo

Constitution
- Basic Law of Macau and the Constitution of the People's Republic of China

Legislative Assembly
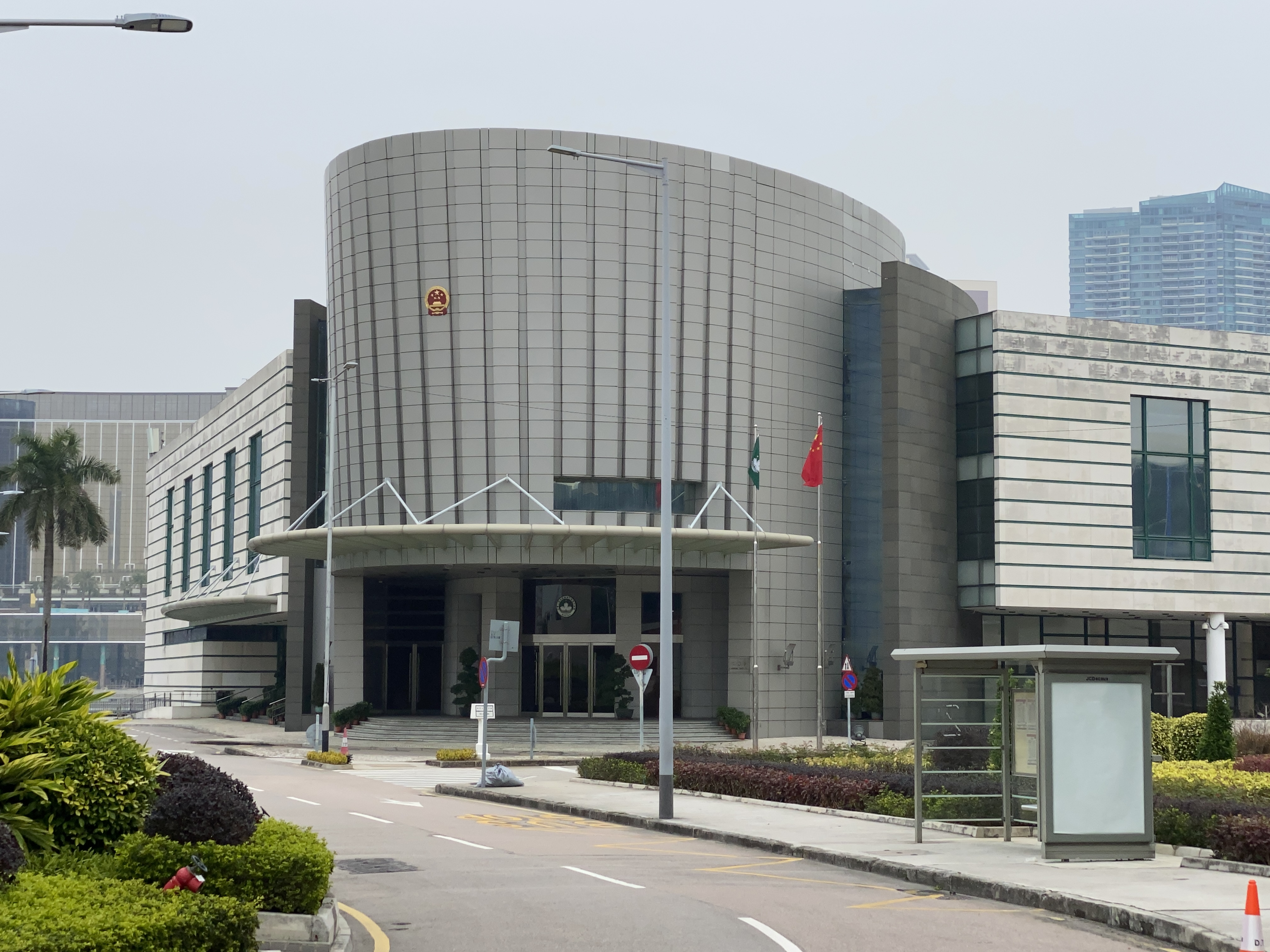
- The Macau Legislative Assembly Building
- Traditional Chinese: 立法會
- Simplified Chinese: 立法会
Transcriptions
Standard Mandarin
- Hanyu Pinyin: Lìfǎ Huì
Yue: Cantonese
- Yale Romanization: Laahpfaat Wúih
- Jyutping: laap6 faat3 wui5

Portuguese name
- Portuguese: Assembleia Legislativa

The Legislative Assembly of the Macao Special Administrative Region (Note: Sometimes translated in English as the Legislative Council, as in a translation provided by the Printing Bureau of the territory's Basic Law.) (Note: Chinese: 澳門特別行政區立法會; Portuguese: Assembleia Legislativa da Região Administrativa Especial de Macau) is the organ of the legislative branch of Macau. It follows China's one country, two systems constitutional arrangement, and is the power centre of Macau's hybrid representative democracy.

It is a 33-member body comprising 14 directly elected members, 12 indirectly elected members representing functional constituencies and 7 members appointed by the chief executive. It is located at Sé.

The functions of the Legislative Assembly are to enact, amend or repeal laws; examine and approve budgets, taxation and public expenditure; and raise questions on the work of the government. In addition, the Legislative Assembly has the power to endorse the appointment and removal of the judges of the Court of Final Appeal and the Chief Judge of the High Court, as well as the power to impeach the Chief Executive of Macau.

== Charter ==
The assembly has the following charter:

1. To enact, amend, suspend or repeal laws
2. To examine and approve budgets; and examine the report on audit
3. To decide on taxation and approve debts to be undertaken by the government
4. To debate the policy addresses by the Chief Executive
5. To debate any issue concerning public interests
6. To receive and handle complaints from Macau residents

== Legislative assembly buildings ==
The assembly sits at a special Legislative Assembly building, a modern three-storey structure located in the Nam Van area.

From 1784 to 1999, the Assembly met at the Leal Senado Building.

== Selection methods ==
According to Annex II of the Basic Law of Macau, the first Legislative Assembly following the establishment of the special administrative region would be constituted in accordance with the Decision of the National People's Congress on the Methodology for the Formation of the First Government, the First Legislative Assembly and the Judicial Bodies of the Macau Special Administrative Region – i.e., 23 members: 8 directly elected, 8 indirectly elected and 7 appointed members.

The second Legislative Assembly would be composed of 27 members: 10 directly elected, 10 indirectly elected and 7 appointed members.

In accordance with Annex II, the number of directly elected legislators for the third Legislative Assembly increased from 10 to 12 in 2005, bringing the number of legislators to 29. After 2009, the selection of the Chief Executive may be changed with a vote of two-thirds of the Legislative Assembly and approval by the National People's Congress Standing Committee. Following 2012 reforms, the Legislative Assembly is now composed of 33 members: 14 directly elected, 12 indirectly elected and 7 appointed members.

== Compositions ==
Composition of the Legislative Council (2013-)
	Number of Members	Returned by	Voting Method	Number of Voters (2021)
Direct Suffrage	14	Popular Vote	Closed list pseudo-proportional (highest averages method)	305,615
Indirect Suffrage	12	Electors nominated by legal persons of specified sectors	Closed list pseudo-proportional (highest averages method)	6,275
Nominated Members	7	Nominated by the Chief Executive	—N/a	

Term (Election)	Diagram	Composition (at commencement)	Speaker	Pro-Beijing	Pro-democracy	Centrist
1st (1999)		1:22	Susana Chou	22	1	–
2nd (2001)		2:25	Susana Chou	25	2	–
3rd (2005)		3:26	Susana Chou	26	3	–
4th (2009)		4:25	Lau Cheok-vá	25	4	–
5th (2013)		4:29	Ho Iat-seng	29	4	–
6th (2017)		4:1:28	Ho Iat-seng (2017–19); Chui Sai-cheong (2019); Kou Hoi-in (2019–)	28	4	1
7th (2021)		2:1:30	Kou Hoi-in	30	2	1
8th (2025)		3:30	Cheong Weng Chon	30	3	–

== See also ==
- Chief Executive of Macau
- Executive Council of Macau
- Municipal Council of Macau
- List of members of the Legislative Assembly of Macau
- Legislative Council of Hong Kong
