= List of members of the Legislative Assembly of Macau =

The following is a historical list of members for the current and past Legislative Assemblies of Macau:

== Political bloc ==
Composition of political bloc since 1976 election: Pro-Beijing camp Macanese camp (merged into Pro-Beijing camp in 1984) Pro-democracy camp Centrism members (post-handover) or indirectly-elected members (pre-handover) Appointed members (pre-handover) (post-handover appointed members are all pro-Beijing)

== List of colonial members ==
Key: DE– Directly elected members; IE– Indirectly elected members; AP– Appointed members

Name	Affiliation (DE)	Camp	1st	2nd	3rd	4th	5th	6th
Carlos Augusto Corrêa Paes d'Assumpção	ADIM	Macanese → Pro-Beijing	DE	DE	DE	DE (Note: Carlos Augusto Corrêa Paes d'Assumpção died in office on 20 April 1992.)		
Diamantino de Oliveira Ferreira	ADIM	Macanese	DE	DE				
Susana Chou Vaz da Luz	ADIM	Macanese → Pro-Beijing	DE		IE	IE		
Susana Chou Vaz da Luz	UNIF	Macanese → Pro-Beijing					DE	IE
José da Conceição Noronha	ADIM	Macanese	DE					
José Patrício Guterres	Democratic	Macanese	DE					
Jorge Alberto da Conceição Hagedorn Rangel	GEDEC	Macanese	DE					
Ma Man Kei		Pro-Beijing	IE	IE	IE	IE	IE	
Pedro Segundo Pan Sau Macias (Peter Pan)		Pro-Beijing	IE	IE	IE	IE	IE	
Li Sai Veng (Lee Sai-wing)			IE	IE (Note: Li Sai Veng died in office, Victor Ng Wing Lok succeeded the seat in January 1980.)				
Lydia Maria dos Anjos Ribeiro			IE					
Chui Tak Kei		Pro-Beijing	IE	IE	IE			
Francisco Xavier da Silva Rodrigues			IE					
Ho Yin		Pro-Beijing	AP	AP (Note: Ho Yin died in office on 6 December 1983, Roque Choi succeeded the seat later.)				
Kwong Bing Yun			AP	AP				
Mário Figueira Isaac			AP					
Anabela Fátima Xavier Sales Ritchie	ADIM	Macanese → Pro-Beijing	AP	DE		AP	IE	IE
Ana Maria Fortuna de Siqueira Basto Perez			AP	AP		AP		
Joaquim Morais Alves	ADIM	Macanese		DE				AP
Joaquim Jorge Perestrelo Neto Valente	Democratic	Macanese		DE	AP (Note: Pedro Ló da Silva left office and was succeeded by Joaquim Jorge Perestrelo Neto Valente.)	AP	AP	AP
Leonel Melcíades dos Passos Boralho	GEDEC	Macanese		DE				
Delfino José Rodrigues Ribeiro				IE				
Joaquim António Ferreira Martins				IE				
Eduardo Jorge Armas Tavares da Silva				AP				
Carlos Cavaleiro Gonçalves Sanches				AP	AP			
Manuel de Mesquita Borges	ADIM	Pro-Beijing			DE			
Lau Cheok Vá	ADIM	Pro-Beijing			DE	IE	IE	IE
Leonel Alberto Alves	ADIM	Pro-Beijing			DE	DE	IE	IE
Alberto Dias Ferreira	ECP	Macanese			DE			
Alexandre Hó	AAAH (Note: Known as "FADM" before 1988.)	Pro-democracy			DE	DE	DE	
Roque Choi		Pro-Beijing		AP	IE			
Hoi Sai Iun (Hoi Sai Un)		Pro-Beijing			AP			IE
Luís Filipe Ferreira Simões					AP (Note: Luís Filipe Ferreira Simões left office after term ended, the seat was succeeded by José António Pinto Belo.)			
Pedro Ló da Silva					AP			
Rui António Craveiro Afonso					AP	AP	AP	AP (Note: Rui António Craveiro Afonso left office in 1997, so the seat was succeeded by Henrique Miguel Rodrigues de Senna Fernandes.)
José António Pinto Belo					AP			
Leong Kam Chun	AAAH	Pro-democracy				DE		
Wong Cheong Nam (Wong Chan-nan)	AAAH	Pro-democracy				DE		
Lao Kuoung Po	ADIM	Pro-Beijing				DE		
Victor Ng Wing Lok		Pro-Beijing		IE	IE	IE	IE	IE
Edmund Ho Hau Wah		Pro-Beijing				IE	IE	IE
Philip Xavier						AP		
Leong Heng Teng	UNIPRO	Pro-Beijing				DE (Note: Elected for new seats in by-election on 10 March 1991.)	DE	DE
Kou Hoi In	UNIPRO	Pro-Beijing				DE	DE	DE
Tong Chi Kin	UPD	Pro-Beijing					DE	DE
Fernando Chui Sai On	UPD	Pro-Beijing					DE	
António Ng Kuok Cheong	ANM	Pro-democracy					DE	DE
Alberto Madeira Noronha	勞工同盟	Macanese					DE	
Pang Va Kam						IE	IE	
José João de Deus Rodrigues do Rosário						AP	AP	AP (Note: José João de Deus Rodrigues do Rosário was succeeded in 1997 by Maria Edith da Silva.)
Raimundo Arrais do Rosário						AP (Note: Appointed after by-election.)	AP	AP
Beatriz Amélia Alves de Sousa Oliveira Basto da Silva							AP	
António Correia							AP	
António José Félix Pontes						AP	AP	AP
Maria Edith da Silva								AP
Henrique Miguel Rodrigues de Senna Fernandes								AP
Chan Kai Kit	Economy and People's; Livelihood Promotion Association	Pro-Beijing						DE
Liu Yuk Lun	Economy and People's; Livelihood Promotion Association	Pro-Beijing						DE
Fong Chi Keong	建設澳門同盟	Pro-Beijing						DE
David Chow Kam-fai	繁榮澳門同盟	Pro-Beijing						DE
Kwan Tsui Hang								IE
José Manuel de Oliveira Rodrigues						IE		AP

== List of SAR members ==
Key: DE– Directly elected members; IE– Indirectly elected members; AP– Appointed members

Name	Affiliation (DE)	Camp	1st	2nd	3rd	4th	5th	6th	7th	8th
Susana Chou Vaz da Luz		Pro-Beijing	IE	IE	IE					
Anabela Fátima Xavier Sales Ritchie		Pro-Beijing	IE							
Lau Cheok Vá		Pro-Beijing	IE	IE	IE	IE				
Leonel Alberto Alves		Pro-Beijing	IE	IE	IE	IE	IE			
Hoi Sai Iun (Hoi Sai Un)		Pro-Beijing	IE	IE						
Victor Ng Wing Lok		Pro-Beijing	IE							
Philip Xavier			AP	AP	AP					
Leong Heng Teng	UNIPRO	Pro-Beijing	DE	DE	DE					
Kou Hoi In	UNIPRO	Pro-Beijing	DE	IE	IE	IE	IE	IE	IE	
Tong Chi Kin	UPD	Pro-Beijing	DE	IE						
António Ng Kuok Cheong	ANM	Pro-democracy	DE	DE	DE	DE	DE			
António Ng Kuok Cheong	ANMD	Pro-democracy						DE		
Liu Yuk Lun	Economy and People's; Livelihood Promotion Association	Pro-Beijing	DE							
Fong Chi Keong	UBM	Pro-Beijing	DE	IE	DE	IE	AP			
David Chow Kam-fai	繁榮澳門同盟	Pro-Beijing	DE	DE	DE					
Iong Weng Ian	UNIPRO	Pro-Beijing	DE	DE	DE					
Chui Sai Cheong		Pro-Beijing	IE	IE	IE	IE	IE	IE	IE	
Kwan Tsui Hang	UPD	Pro-Beijing	IE	DE	DE	DE	DE			
Stanley Au Chong-kit		Pro-Beijing	AP	AP						
Cheong Vai Kei		Pro-Beijing	AP	AP						
Vong Hin Fai		Pro-Beijing	AP	AP		AP	AP	IE	IE	
Ho Teng Iat		Pro-Beijing	AP	AP	IE					
José Manuel de Oliveira Rodrigues		Pro-Beijing	AP	AP						
João Baptista Manuel Leão		Pro-Beijing	AP							
Tsui Wai Kwan		Pro-Beijing		AP	AP	AP	AP			
Vitor Cheung Lup Kwan	社會經濟改革促進會	Pro-Beijing		DE	IE	IE	IE	IE		
Au Kam San	ANM	Pro-democracy		DE	DE	DE	DE			
Au Kam San	ANMD	Pro-democracy						DE		
Leong Iok Wa	UPD	Pro-Beijing		DE	DE					
João Bosco Cheang Hong Lok	娛職聯誼會	Pro-Beijing		DE						
Jorge Manuel Fão	繁榮澳門同盟	Pro-Beijing		DE						
Cheang Chi Keong		Pro-Beijing		IE	IE	IE	IE			
Chan Chak Mo		Pro-Beijing		IE	IE	IE	IE	IE	IE	
Chan Meng Kam	ACUM	Pro-Beijing			DE	DE	DE			
Angela Leong On Kei	NMDU	Pro-Beijing			DE (Note: Known as "Alliance for the Development of Macau" before 2009.)	DE	DE	DE	IE	
Ung Choi Kun	ACUM	Pro-Beijing			DE	DE				
José Maria Pereira Coutinho	NE	Pro-democracy			DE	DE	DE	DE	DE	DE
Lee Chong Cheng	UPD	Pro-Beijing			IE	DE				
Lei Pui Lam		Pro-Beijing			AP					
Sam Chan Io		Pro-Beijing			AP					
José Chui Sai Peng		Pro-Beijing			AP	AP	IE	IE	IE	
Ieong Tou Hong		Pro-Beijing			AP					
Lao Pun Lap		Pro-Beijing			AP					
Mak Soi Kun	UGM	Pro-Beijing				DE	DE	DE		
Paul Chan Wai Chi	ANM	Pro-democracy				DE				
Melinda Chan Mei Yi	MUDAR	Pro-Beijing				DE	DE			
Ho Ion Sang	UNIPRO	Pro-Beijing				DE	DE	DE	IE	
Tommy Lau Veng Seng		Pro-Beijing				AP	AP			
Dominic Sio Chi Wai		Pro-Beijing				AP	AP			
Tong Io Cheng		Pro-Beijing				AP	AP			
Ho Sio Kam		Pro-Beijing				AP				
Ho Iat Seng		Pro-Beijing				IE	IE	IE (Note: Ho Iat Seng resigned on 5 July 2019 to run for Chief Executive and was succeeded by Wang Sai Man following the by-election of Industry, Commerce and Finance seat on 25 November 2019.)		
Si Ka Lom	ACUM	Pro-Beijing					DE	DE	DE	
Song Pek Kei	ACUM	Pro-Beijing					DE	DE	DE	DE
Zheng Anting	UGM	Pro-Beijing					DE	DE	DE	
Leong Veng Chai	NE	Pro-democracy					DE			
Wong Kit Cheng	UNIPRO	Pro-Beijing					DE			
Wong Kit Cheng	AGMM/美好家園聯盟	Pro-Beijing						DE	DE	DE
Lam Heong Sang		Pro-Beijing				IE	IE			
Lei Cheng I	UPD	Pro-Beijing					IE	DE	DE	DE
Chan Iek Lap		Pro-Beijing					IE	IE	IE	
Chan Hong		Pro-Beijing					IE	IE		
Ma Chi Seng		Pro-Beijing					AP	AP	AP	
Leong Sun Iok	UPD	Pro-Beijing						DE	DE	DE
Lam Iok Fong	Cívico	Centrist						DE		
Sulu Sou Ka Hou	ANM	Pro-democracy						DE		
Ip Sio Kai		Pro-Beijing						IE	IE	
Lei Chan U		Pro-Beijing						IE	IE	
Lam Lon Wai		Pro-Beijing						IE	IE	
Wang Sai Man		Pro-Beijing						IE	IE	
Iau Teng Pio		Pro-Beijing						AP	AP	
Wu Chou Kit		Pro-Beijing						AP	AP	
Fong Ka Chio		Pro-Beijing						AP		
Pang Chuan		Pro-Beijing						AP	AP	
Lao Chi Ngai	澳粵同盟	Pro-Beijing						AP		DE
Chan Wa Keong		Pro-Beijing						AP		
Che Sai Wang	NE	Pro-democracy							DE	DE
Leong Hong Sai	群力促進會	Pro-Beijing							DE	DE
Lo Choi In		Pro-Beijing							DE	
Lam U Tou	Sinergia	Centrist							DE	
Ngan Iek Hang	群力促進會	Pro-Beijing							DE	DE
Ma Io Fong		Pro-Beijing							DE	
Lei Leong Wong	澳門民聯協進會	Pro-Beijing							DE	DE
Chan Hou Seng		Pro-Beijing							AP	
Kou Kam Fai		Pro-Beijing							AP	
Cheung Kin Chung		Pro-Beijing							AP	
陳禮祺	澳門民聯協進會									DE
陳孝永	新希望									DE
李居仁	澳粵同盟									DE
呂綺穎	美好家園聯盟									DE

== See also ==
- Legislative Assembly of Macau
