= 2025 Macanese legislative election =

- 14 September 2025
- 14 of the 33 seats in the Legislative Assembly
- Turnout: 53.35% (▲10.97 pp)
Party	Leader	Vote %	Seats	+/–
Pro-Beijing parties
ACUM	Si Ka Lon	18.16	3	0
UPD	Leong Iok Wa	16.91	2	0
UNIPRO	Ng Siu Lai	13.41	2	0
UGM	Mak Soi Kun	13.23	2	0
AGMM	Wong Kit Cheng	11.56	2	0
Pro-democracy parties
NE	José Pereira Coutinho	26.73	3	+1
This lists parties that won seats. See the complete results below.
President before	President after
Kou Hoi In; OMKC	Cheong Weng Chon; Appointed

Legislative elections were held in Macau on 14 September 2025 to select 33 members of the Legislative Assembly of Macau, with 14 directly elected by all electorates, 12 indirectly elected by special interest groups and seven appointed by the Chief Executive 15 days after the announcement of the election results.

As a result of the mass disqualification in the last election, more than a dozen pro-democracy members, including former legislators, were barred from running in this election under the five-year ban.

== Nomination ==
The authorities confirmed a total of eight candidate lists for the direct election of 14 seats after the end of nomination period, marking the lowest since the handover. Among the eight "nomination panels", five were from the pro-Beijing camp and only one from pro-democracy camp, after majority of them were disqualified in 2021. Macau Creating People's Livelihood Force (澳門創建民生力量) ran in the election for the first time, hoping to prioritise local employment and social welfare and housing.

The team led by Wong Wai-man, the workman popularly known as "Captain Macau" for his eyebrow-raising stance on politics, was disqualified due to insufficient endorsements after majority of signatures were found ineligible. He was arrested days before the end of the nomination period for illegal mahjong operations.

== Disqualification ==
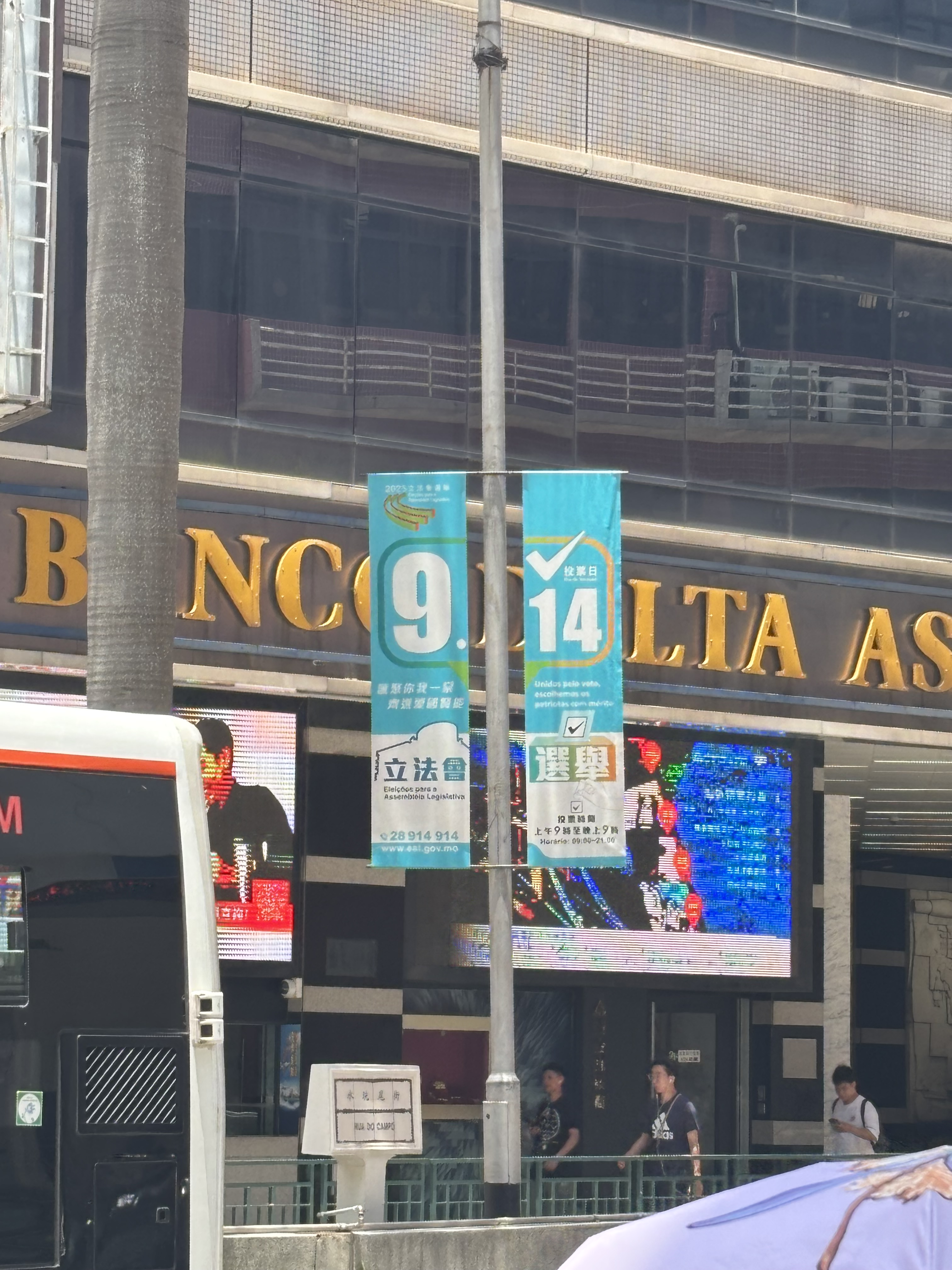
Election publications seen on streets

Under new rules introduced in 2024 mirroring those in Hong Kong, all candidates must be screened before validating their nomination to determine whether they are "patriots". All candidates are required to uphold the Basic Law and to pledge allegiance to the country.

Electoral Affairs Commission announced that 12 candidates from two lists, Synergy Power and Macau Creating People's Livelihood Force, are ineligible for the direct election. The commission said the Committee for Safeguarding National Security (similar to that of Hong Kong), after eligibility reviews, determined that some candidates were "not supportive" and "not allegiant" to the People's Republic of China and Macau Special Administrative Region. The disqualified candidates are barred from appealing against the verdict under national security laws. Macanese government strongly supported the decision which fully implement the fundamental principle of "Macau governed by patriots".

Ron Lam U Tou, the incumbent moderate legislator from the Synergy Power, said he was surprised but remained calm with clear conscience, adding that he firmly believes that "sunshine always follows the storm". Tim Wong Tak Loi, a former civil servant who led another disqualified list at his first bid, said he respected the decision and reaffirmed his "unchanged" patriotic stance.

Au Kam San, a lawmaker who stepped down in 2021, said this decision targeted candidates that were not even from the opposition and was evident in suppressing any voices that the government deemed were not patriotic enough. He was arrested under the national security law in August, weeks before the election, for alleged ties to "foreign groups endangering China". He was the first person to be arrested for national security crimes. The European Union condemned the arrest which "adds to the existing concerns about the ongoing erosion of political pluralism and freedom of speech" in Macau.

Another pro-democracy former legislator Antonio Ng wrote on social media that he was "ordered" to leave Macau and could only return a week after the polling day.

== Results ==
The turnout significantly rose to 53%, about 11 pp higher than in 2021, likely as a result of the government's voting initiative. Chief Executive Sam Hou Fai repeatedly encouraged civil servants to vote as to "pledge allegiance" to the Basic Law and the Special Administrative Region. Free territory-wide public transport is also provided.

As a result of the absence of other pro-democratic or centrist parties, New Hope led by José Pereira Coutinho, a party seen as representing the civil servants and Macanese and traditionally regarded as pro-democracy, won more than 25% of votes and topped the list. New Hope and Macau United Citizens Association both won three seats.

Two long-time legislators, Kou Hoi In and Chui Sai Cheong, chose not to run for re-election, opening the field for selecting the new president and vice-president of the legislature.

The government announced a surprise reshuffle on 29 September, the second mid-term change to the cabinet since the handover in 1999, along with the appointment of seven members to the legislature by the Chief Executive. Secretary for Administration and Justice Cheong Weng Chon was replaced by Wong Sio Chak. Cheong was appointed as a member of the Legislative Assembly, and elected as the President of the legislature on 16 October, marking the first instance that a minister became a legislator and the speakership was occupied by an appointed member.

Party	Votes	%	+/–	Seats	+/–
Macau United Citizens Association	29,464	18.16	-1.98	3	Steady
Macau Federation of Trade Unions	27,435	16.91	-1.08	2	Steady
Union for Promoting Progress	21,750	13.41	+1.98	2	Steady
Macau-Guangdong Union	21,464	13.23	+0.50	2	Steady
Alliance for a Happy Home	18,752	11.56	+0.78	2	Steady
Pro-Beijing camp	118,865	73.27	+0.20	11	Steady
New Hope	43,367	26.73	+12.93	3	▲1
Pro-democracy camp	43,367	26.73	+12.93	3	▲1
Functional constituencies and appointees
Macau Union of Employers' Interests				4	Steady
Macau Union of Professional Interests				3	Steady
União Cultural e Desportiva do Sol Nascente				2	Steady
União das Associações de Trabalhadores				1	New
Federation of Employees Associations				1	▼1
Association for the Promotion of Social Services and Education				1	Steady
Chief Executive appointees				7	–
Total	162,232	100.00	–	33	0
Valid votes	162,232	92.55	-3.66		
Invalid votes	7,077	4.04	+2.53		
Blank votes	5,987	3.42	+1.13		
Total votes	175,296	100.00	–		
Registered voters/turnout	328,506	53.36	+10.97		
Source: Boletim Oficial

== See also ==
- 2025 Hong Kong legislative election
