= 2017 Macanese legislative election =

- 17 September 2017
- 14 of the 33 seats in the Legislative Assembly
- Turnout: 57.22%
Party	Leader	Vote %	Seats	+/–
Pro-Beijing parties
ACUM	Si Ka Lon	14.47	2	−1
UGM	Mak Soi Kun	9.97	2	0
UPD	Lei Cheng I	9.67	2	+1
UNIPRO	Ho Ion-sang	7.15	1	−1
NMDU	Leong On-kei	6.05	1	0
AGMM	Wong Kit Cheng	5.50	1	New
Pro-democracy parties
ANMD	Antonio Ng	12.43	2	New
NE	José Pereira Coutinho	8.33	1	−1
ANM	Sulu Sou	6.59	1	−1
Unaffiliated parties
Cívico	Agnes Lam	5.56	1	+1
This lists parties that won seats. See the complete results below.
President before	President after
Ho Iat Seng; OMKC	Ho Iat Seng; OMKC

Legislative elections were held in Macau on 17 September 2017 according to the provisions of the Basic Law of Macau. Out of a total of 33 seats, 14 were directly elected by universal suffrage under the highest averages method, while 12 were voted on from the Indirect election, and 7 from nomination by the chief executive.

== Background ==
Formerly a Portuguese colony, Macau has been a Special Administrative Region within China since 1999. As a Special Administrative Region it is entitled to a high degree of autonomy from the mainland Chinese legal system through the year 2050, although China represents the city on foreign policy matters. Macau's economy is based primarily on its status as a tech and financial sector, as well as its internationally famous casino industry.

The previous legislative elections took place in 2013. The pro-establishment camp ACUM, led by Chan Meng Kam, received 18.02% of the votes with 3 seats, and the next largest party, the pro-democracy camp ANMD+APMD, led by António Ng, received 15.73% of the votes with 2 seats, while the pro-establishment camp UGM received 11.09% with 2 seats. Due to the characteristics of the Macau election system, only 14 members are directly elected. On 10 July 2017, twenty-five parties submitted their nominations for the direct election, including current incumbents (Ho Ion Sang, António Ng Kuok Cheong, José Pereira Coutinho, Leong Veng Chai, Song Pek Kei, Si Ka Lon, Wong Kit Cheng, Au Kam San, Angela Leong On Kei, Lei Cheng I, Melinda Chan Mei Yi, Zheng Anting, Mak Soi Kun) and new candidates.

== Electoral system ==
Macau's direct electoral system is based around proportional representation, with elections carried out through a closed party-list balloting system. This means that each geographic electoral district has multiple members, with the number of its seats filled by each competing party determined by the proportion of the vote that party receives. Parties nominate a slate of candidates (generally, one per seat in each district where the party is competing). After the election, party leaders decide who from the slate will fill the party's legislative seats.

Shortly before usual campaign period for the 2013 elections, the Electoral Affairs Commission of Macau banned the use of commercial advertising by election candidates. The new election rules stipulate that candidates should not carry out activities that could influence voters in the two-month period between their registration and the start of the campaign period on August 31. Commercial advertising is barred from most public areas, except those specially designated by the government. Even in areas where campaigning is permitted, it is still limited to a 14-day official campaign period. These restrictions are intended to limit the advertising advantage of wealthy business interests. However, they have been criticized for limiting the amount of canvassing candidates with less money can do, thus encouraging clientelistic bloc voting where parties simply strike deals with associations, business interests and community leaders to turn out assured votes in their favor. Working around the rules, candidates resorted to using loudspeakers to promote their campaigns.

Among the most powerful special interests in Macau are casinos. Macau's casino industry has a long history of Triad and other organized crime connections. Since laws around casinos were liberalized in 2002 to promote more foreign investment, the Triad has lost its stranglehold on Macau's casino industry (although it remains deeply embedded in it). Casinos have long played a major role in clientelistic politics in Macau, and since liberalization their influence has further increased.

== Results ==
Party	Votes	%	Seats	+/–
Macau-Guangdong Union	17,214	9.97	2	0
Union for Development	16,696	9.67	2	+1
Macau United Citizens Association	14,879	8.62	1	–2
Union for Promoting Progress	12,340	7.15	1	–1
New Macau Development Union	10,452	6.05	1	0
Macau Citizens’ Development Association	10,103	5.85	1	New
Alliance for a Happy Home	9,496	5.50	1	New
Alliance for Change	8,186	4.74	0	–1
Pro-Beijing camp	99,366	57.56	9	–1
New Hope	14,386	8.33	1	–1
New Democratic Macau Association	11,381	6.59	1	New
Democratic Prosperous Macau Association	10,080	5.84	1	0
New Macau Progressives	9,213	5.34	1	0
United Citizens for Building Macau Association	904	0.52	0	0
Association for Democracy Activism	279	0.16	0	0
New Ideals of Macau	199	0.12	0	0
Pro-democracy camp	46,442	26.90	4	0
Civil Watch	9,590	5.56	1	+1
Synergy Power	7,162	4.15	0	0
Front Line of Casino Workers	3,126	1.81	0	0
Pearl Horizon Buyers' Rights Defence Union	2,399	1.39	0	0
Mutual Help Grassroots	1,350	0.78	0	0
Citizens' Power	1,305	0.76	0	0
Aurora of Grassroots	823	0.48	0	0
Powers of Political Thought	672	0.39	0	0
Ou Mun Kong I	393	0.23	0	0
Unaffiliated	26,820	15.54	1	+1
Functional constituencies and appointees
Macau Union of Employers Interests			4	0
Excellent Culture and Sport Union			2	0
Federation of Employees Associations			2	0
Macau Union of Professional Interests			2	–1
Association for the Promotion of Social Services and Education			1	0
Macau Union of Medical Professional Interests			1	New
Chief Executive appointees			7	0
Total	172,628	100.00	33	0
Valid votes	172,628	98.72		
Invalid votes	1,300	0.74		
Blank votes	944	0.54		
Total votes	174,872	100.00		
Registered voters/turnout	305,615	57.22		
Source: Boletim Oficial
