= Directly elected member (Macau) =

Macau
- Geographical constituency for the Legislative Assembly of Macau
- Region: Macau

Current constituency
- Created: 1976
- Number of members: 14 (2013–); 12 (2005–2013); 10 (2001–2005); 8 (1992–2001); 6 (1976–1992)

Macau is the only geographical constituency in the elections for the Legislative Assembly of Macau, with three sub-geographical constituencies under it.

== Overview ==
The constituency was set up in 1976 election when the highest averages method of the closed party-list proportional representation electoral system was introduced. No change of boundary had been made throughout since 1976.

The constituency covers all the parishes and zone in Macau. Members have been elected with seats apportioned with a peculiar highest averages method. While D'Hondt uses 1,2,3,4,... as divisors, Macau instead uses 1,2,4,8,... as divisors Their method disadvantages large parties, which is highly unusual among electoral systems. Suffrage was opened to Macau Residents without Portuguese citizenship in 1984.

== Background ==
The constituency was formed since the 1976 legislative election. Seats for the constituency have gradually increased.

Distribution of seats
	Direct suffrage	Total	Percentage
1976	6	17	35.3%
1980	6	17	35.3%
1984	6	17	35.3%
1988	6	17	35.3%
1992	8	23	34.8%
1996	8	23	34.8%
2001	10	27	37.0%
2005	12	29	41.4%
2009	12	29	41.4%
2013	14	33	42.4%
2017	14	33	42.4%
2021	14	33	42.4%

== Return Members ==
Below are all the members since the creation of the Macau constituency.

Election	Members													
1976	d'Assumpção (ADIM →UE)	Ferreira (ADIM)	Susana Chou (ADIM)	Noronha (ADIM)	Guterres (CDM)	Rangel (GEDEC)								
1980	d'Assumpção (ADIM →UE)	Ferreira (ADIM)	Ritchie (ADIM)	J. Alves (ADIM)	Valente (CDM)	Boralho (GIMA)								
1984	d'Assumpção (ADIM →UE)	L. Alves (UE)	Lau Cheok Vá (UE)	Borges (UE)	Alexandre Hó (FADM →AAAH →AA)	Ferreira (ECP)								
1988	d'Assumpção (ADIM →UE)	L. Alves (UE)	Lao Kuoung Po (UE)	Leong Kam Chu (AAAH)	Alexandre Hó (FADM →AAAH →AA)	Wong Cheong Nam (AAAH)								
1992	Leong Heng Teng (UNIPRO →UPP)	Noronha (LABOR)	Susana Chou (UNIF)	Antonio Ng (ANMD →APMD) (Note: Affiliated to New Macau Association (until 2017) and New Democratic Macau Association (since 2017))	Alexandre Hó (FADM →AAAH →AA)	Fernando Chui (UPD)	Tong Chi Kin (UPD)	Kou Hoi In (UNIPRO)						
1996	Leong Heng Teng (UNIPRO →UPP)	Fong Chi Keong (UDM)	David Chow (CODEM)	Antonio Ng (ANMD →APMD)	Chan Kai-kit (APPEM)	Liu Yuk Lun (APPEM)	Tong Chi Kin (UPD)	Kou Hoi In (UNIPRO)						
1999 (b)	Leong Heng Teng (UNIPRO →UPP)	Fong Chi Keong (UDM)	David Chow (CODEM)	Antonio Ng (ANMD →APMD)	Iong Weng Ian (UNIPRO →UPP)	Liu Yuk Lun (APPEM)	Tong Chi Kin (UPD)	Kou Hoi In (UNIPRO)						
2001	Leong Heng Teng (UNIPRO →UPP)	Jorge Fão (CODEM)	David Chow (CODEM)	Antonio Ng (ANMD →APMD)	Iong Weng Ian (UNIPRO →UPP)	Leong Iok Wa (UPD)	Kwan Tsui Hang (UPD)	Vitor Cheung (ARSEM)	João Bosco Cheang (AEA)	Au Kam San (ANMD)				
2005	Leong Heng Teng (UNIPRO →UPP)	Fong Chi Keong (UBM)	David Chow (CODEM)	Antonio Ng (ANMD →APMD)	Iong Weng Ian (UNIPRO →UPP)	Leong Iok Wa (UPD)	Kwan Tsui Hang (UPD)	Chan Meng Kam (ACUM)	Ung Choi Kun (ACUM)	Au Kam San (ANMD)	Leong On Kei (AMD→ NUDM)	Coutinho (NE)		
2009	Ho Ion Sang (UPP)	Paul Chan (APMD)	Melinda Chan (MUDAR)	Antonio Ng (ANMD →APMD)	Mak Soi Kun (UMG)	Lee Chong Cheng (UPD)	Kwan Tsui Hang (UPD)	Chan Meng Kam (ACUM)	Ung Choi Kun (ACUM)	Au Kam San (ANMD)	Leong On Kei (AMD→ NUDM)	Coutinho (NE)		
2013	Ho Ion Sang (UPP)	Song Pek Kei (ACUM)	Melinda Chan (MUDAR)	Antonio Ng (ANMD →APMD)	Mak Soi Kun (UMG)	Zheng Anting (UMG)	Kwan Tsui Hang (UPD)	Chan Meng Kam (ACUM)	Si Ka Lom (ACUM)	Au Kam San (ANMD)	Leong On Kei (AMD→ NUDM)	Coutinho (NE)	Leong Veng Chai (NE)	Wong Kit Cheng (UPP)
2017	Ho Ion Sang (UPP)	Song Pek Kei (ACUM)	Wong Kit Cheng (ABL)	Antonio Ng (ANMD →APMD)	Mak Soi Kun (UMG)	Zheng Anting (UMG)	Lei Cheng I (UPD)	Leong Sun Iok (UPD)	Si Ka Lom (ACUM)	Au Kam San (ANMD)	Leong On Kei (AMD→ NUDM)	Coutinho (NE)	Sulu Sou (AMN)	Lam Iok Fong (Cívico)
2021	Leong Hong Sai (UPP)	Song Pek Kei (ACUM)	Wong Kit Cheng (ABL)	Ma Io Fong (ABL)	Lo Choi In (UMG)	Zheng Anting (UMG)	Lei Cheng I (UPD)	Leong Sun Iok (UPD)	Si Ka Lom (ACUM)	Lei Leong Wong (ACUM)	Ngan Iek Hang (UPP)	Coutinho (NE)	Che Sai Wang (NE)	Lam U Tou (PS)
2025	Leong Hong Sai (UPP)	Song Pek Kei (ACUM)	Wong Kit Cheng (ABL)	呂綺穎 (ABL)	柳智毅 (UMG)	李居仁 (UMG)	Lei Cheng I (UPD)	Leong Sun Iok (UPD)	陳禮祺 (ACUM)	Lei Leong Wong (ACUM)	Ngan Iek Hang (UPP)	Coutinho (NE)	Che Sai Wang (NE)	陳孝永 (NE)
