= 2013 Macanese legislative election =

- 15 September 2013
- 14 of the 33 seats in the Legislative Assembly
- Turnout: 55.02%
Party	Leader	Vote %	Seats	+/–
Pro-Beijing parties
ACUM	Chan Meng Kam	18.04	3	+1
UGM	Mak Soi Kun	11.09	2	+1
UNIPRO	Ho Ion Sang	10.79	2	+1
NMDU	Leong On-kei	8.94	1	0
UPD	Kwan Tsui Hang	8.16	1	−1
MUDAR	Melinda Chan	5.98	1	0
Pro-democracy parties
ANM	Antonio Ng	15.73	2	−1
NE	José Pereira Coutinho	8.96	2	+1
This lists parties that won seats. See the complete results below.
President before	President after
Lau Cheok Va; CCCAE	Ho Iat Seng; OMKC

Legislative elections were held in Macau on 15 September 2013 according to the provisions of the Basic Law of Macau. This election was the first of its kind succeeding the reform of the Legislative Assembly that created four new seats; two new geographical constituency seats and two new functional constituency seats. Out of a total of 33 seats, 14 were elected by universal suffrage under the highest averages method, while 12 were voted on from the Functional constituency, and 7 from nomination by the Chief Executive.

== Background ==
Formerly a Portuguese colony, Macau has been a Special Administrative Region within China since 1999. As a Special Administrative Region it is entitled to a high degree of autonomy from the mainland Chinese legal system through the year 2050, although China represents the city on foreign policy matters. Macau's economy is based primarily on its status as a tech and financial sector, as well as its internationally famous casino industry.

The previous legislative election took place in 2009. The pro-democracy camp ANMD+APMD, led by António Ng, received 19.35% of the votes cast, and the next largest party, the pro-establishment camp UPD, received 14.88% in vote with 2 seats while the pro-establishment ACUM received 12.00% with 2 seats. Due to the characteristics of the Macau election system, only 14 members are directly elected. On 1 July 2013 twenty-two parties have submitted their nominations for the direct election including current incumbents (Kwan Tsui Hang, Chan Meng Kam, António Ng, Paul Chan, Angela Leong, Ho Ion Sang, Au Kam San, José Pereira Coutinho, Mak Soi Kun, and Melinda Chan) and new candidates.

== New structure of the Legislative Assembly ==
=== Previous Structure ===
Macau's government is headed by the Chief Executive, who controls government appointments and in many ways serves as the face of the city. Prior to 2012, the Chief Executive was elected by a 300-member Election Committee consisting of representatives from functional constituencies. 100 total came from the industrial, commercial and financial sectors, 18 from the culture sector, 20 from the education sector, 30 from the "specialty" sector, 12 from the sports sector, 40 from the labor sector, 34 from the social services sector, and 6 total from various religious groups. 16 were representatives of the Legislative Assembly of Macau and 24 were Macau representatives in the mainland Chinese government. While all members of the Election Committee are technically elected, in practice they are effectively appointed as each functional constituency usually nominates only one candidate.

Most power in the Macau government is concentrated in the Legislative Assembly. Macau's Legislative Assembly is unicameral (consisting of a single house). Prior to 2012 it had 29 members - 12 directly elected (in citywide elections), 10 indirectly elected (appointed through election by functional constituencies representing "employee", "business", "professional" and "charity/culture/education/sports" interests) and 7 appointed by the Chief Executive.

Democracy advocates in Macau had criticized the large number of indirectly elected members, charging that these tended to be pro-establishment and pro-Beijing businesspeople. As an alternative, they called for a larger number of directly elected legislators.

=== 2012 reform package ===
As a result of the 2012 passage of "Amendment to Electoral Law for the Legislative Assembly of Macau" also known as the "+2+2+100" Law, the number of Legislative Council members is increased from 29 to 33. Two new geographical constituency seats, and two new indirectly elected Functional Constituency seats are created. Another key proposal was increasing the Election Committee for the chief executive election from 300 members to 400 on the next Chief Executive election in 2014. These changes were designed to create representation for a larger number of groups in the Election Committee and to reduce the power of the Chief Executive over the Legislative Assembly. However, democracy advocates criticized the law for not going far enough.

=== Geographical constituency ===
Under the constitutional reform package passed in 2012, this election saw AL increase its total size from 29 seats to 33 seats, half of which are geographical constituencies (GCs) and half functional constituencies (FCs). The GC seats are returned by universal suffrage in citywide elections, with gaining two extra seats.

Geographical constituency	No. of Seats		
Geographical constituency	2008	2012	Change
Macau	12	14	+2

=== Functional constituencies ===
The Welfare, Culture, Education, and Sports constituency is split into two groups. Culture and Sports retains the two seats of the initial group, with the two incumbents (Victor Cheung Lup Kwan and Chan Chak Mo) running unopposed. Culture and Sports continues to be run by the Excellent Culture and Sports Union Association. A new constituency is created for Welfare and Education, receiving one seat (Cahn Hong, unopposed). Welfare and Education is managed by the Association for Promotion of Social Services and Education.

Additionally, one seat is added to the Professionals constituency, led by the Macau Professional Interest Union. Chan Lek Lap is elected, unopposed.

Functional Constituency	2008	2012	Change
Business	4	4	0
Labor	2	2	0
Professional	2	3	+1
Welfare and Education	2	2	0
Culture and Sport	0	1	+1

== The pro-democracy lists ==
This year, there are three lists for the pro-democrats instead of two campaigning on high property prices and freedom of speech. The three lists included the New Macau Association (ANM), New Hope (NE), and the addition of New Macau Liberals.

Antonio Ng for ANM campaigns for universal suffrage, promotion of a minimum wage and public housing, and increasing government accountability.

José Maria Pereira Couthino of NE campaigns for improvements in public housing and pension services, equal pay for workers, and increasing government accountability.

Jason Chao Teng-hei is a radical young candidate for New Macau Liberals and a prominent social activist for LGBT rights.

== The pro-establishment lists ==
Pro-establishment Chan Meng-kam, casino owner and lawmaker-elect of the ACUM, said he believed the city should implement universal suffrage "step by step", and that functional constituencies should be preserved.

Others with casino links on the pro-establishment lists were Angela Leong On-kei of New Union for Macau's Development and Melinda Chan Mei-yi of the Alliance for Change. Leong is married to gambling mogul Stanley Ho Hung-sun, while Chan is married to casino tycoon David Chow Kam-fai.

== Macau Election Laws ==
Macau's direct electoral system is based around proportional representation, with elections carried out through a closed party-list balloting system. This means that each geographic electoral district has multiple members, with the number of its seats filled by each competing party determined by the proportion of the vote that party receives. Parties nominate a slate of candidates (generally, one per seat in each district where the party is competing). After the election, party leaders decide who from the slate will fill the party's legislative seats.

Shortly before usual campaign period for the 2013 elections, the Electoral Affairs Commission of Macau banned the use of commercial advertising by election candidates. The new election rules stipulate that candidates should not carry out activities that could influence voters in the two-month period between their registration and the start of the campaign period on August 31. Commercial advertising is barred from most public areas, except those specially designated by the government. Even in areas where campaigning is permitted, it is still limited to a 14-day official campaign period. These restrictions are intended to limit the advertising advantage of wealthy business interests. However, they have been criticized for limiting the amount of canvassing candidates with less money can do, thus encouraging clientelistic bloc voting where parties simply strike deals with associations, business interests and community leaders to turn out assured votes in their favor. Working around the rules, candidates resorted to using loudspeakers to promote their campaigns.

Among the most powerful special interests in Macau are casinos. Macau's casino industry has a long history of Triad and other organized crime connections. Since laws around casinos were liberalized in 2002 to promote more foreign investment, the Triad has lost its stranglehold on Macau's casino industry (although it remains deeply embedded in it). Casinos have long played a major role in clientelistic politics in Macau, and since liberalization their influence has further increased.

== Controversies ==
The total of the void ballot is very close to the total of the winning vote

=== Electoral Affairs Commission Bias ===
Jason Chao chairman of New Macau Association accuse the CAEAL (Electoral Affairs Commission) being biased suggesting the New Macau Liberals should modifying their political platform by deleting two sentences "Secretary for Administration and Justice Florinda Chan must step down for her ineffectuality," and "an investigation into former Chief Executive Edmund Ho’s alleged abuse of power." On 23 August Jason Chao suggests he may sue the CAEAL after the legislative election.

== Scandals ==
=== Community members bribed potential voters with food and transportation and caught by The Commission Against Corruption ===
Mr. He, who was a member of a social community of Macau, and Mr. Huang were accused of bribing potential voters and caught by the Commission Against Corruption on September 13. Mr. He has called several members of his community and asked them to support a candidate. He offered free meals and transportation in exchange for the support. Mr. Huang has helped Mr. He call more than one hundred voters based on Mr. He's testimony.

=== UPD and UGM false start ===
Kwan Tsui Hang (Union for Development) and Mak Soi Kun (Macau-Guangdong Union) were both accused of illegal campaigning on 8 August 2013. In various locations banner supporting Kwan Tsui Hang were hung outside of the campaigning period. Lee Kin Yun claims UGM vice-president Mak Soi Kun was vote buying during a function gift bags were handed out with the name, photo and address of Mak Soi Kun with the estimated value of 100 Macanese pataca.

=== The ongoing campaign has severely interfered with public order ===
On March 22, four members of Macau Conscience delivered campaign material at Haojiang High School without permission and monitored by more than ten police officers. They are even asked to join the protest around the campus.

=== Nomination list dispute within MS2 ===
Luiz Pedruco president of 21st Century Macau Association was accused of replacing José Estorninho with his own named on the nomination list. Under the pressure, he purposes a rally in 30 June 3013 to properly nomination its list of members. Electoral Affairs Commission of Macau soon disqualified 21st Century Macau Association for the lack of valid signatures required for Nomination.

=== Lack of organization at polling places ===
During the voting day, 14 people were reported to police because of illegally recording voting process. They came from 8 different polling stations. 13 of them were arrested immediately by police, and one of them were brought back to the police station for further questioning.

=== 8000 notifications of voting were sent back to polling stations by postal service because of wrong address ===
Since July 2013, voting notifications with important information regarding voting agenda and other relevant information have been sent to citizens. By August 2013, all the notifications have been sent, but 8000 of them were sent back by postal service. This incident has caused repercussions in Macau society.

== Results ==
The 2013 elections were met with a significant improvement in voter quality, with nearly 280,000 Macau residents having registered as voters for the election. Despite being called the “low-profile” election by many in the media, this election in fact reflected a high voter turnout at 55%. This marked an increase of 80% from the 2001 election, and the turnout rate exceeded 59%. This enormous increase in political participation may be attributed to the high levels of competition between the political parties and the introduction of dynamic newcomers in the face of candidates backed by powerful local families.

However, ultimately the top two lists, in terms of number of votes received, featured candidates hailing from, and relying on clanship connections with, the Fujianese and Guangdong communities. Macau's strong “association culture” that advantages such candidates was demonstrated clearly in this year's elections with the win of ACUM's pro-Beijing candidate, Chan Meng-kam, who is both a Fujianese community leader and a casino owner. He secured the highest number of votes at 26,385 (18% of the total), breaking a record in Macau by winning three seats from a single candidate list.

Meanwhile, newer, pro-democrat candidates such as Jason Chao Teng-hei, a radical young candidate for New Macau Liberals faced difficulties winning out at the polls. Initially hoping to secure the youth vote, he was only able to get 3,227 votes in the face of the new restrictions on campaigning, ultimately resulting in a loss of one of the democrats’ three seats.

Party	Votes	%	Seats	+/–
Macau United Citizens Association	26,426	18.04	3	+1
Macau-Guangdong Union	16,251	11.09	2	+1
Union for Promoting Progress	15,815	10.79	2	+1
New Macau Development Union	13,093	8.94	1	0
Union for Development	11,960	8.16	1	–1
Alliance for Change	8,755	5.98	1	0
Pro-Beijing camp	92,300	63.00	10	+2
New Hope	13,130	8.96	2	+1
Democratic Prosperous Macau Association	10,987	7.50	1	–1
Democratic New Macau Association	8,827	6.02	1	0
New Macau Liberals	3,227	2.20	0	–
Innovative Action	1,642	1.12	0	0
Macau Dream	1,006	0.69	0	New
Association for Democracy Activism	923	0.63	0	0
Pro-democracy camp	39,742	27.12	4	0
Civil Watch	5,225	3.57	0	0
Caring for Macau	5,323	3.63	0	0
Association for Joint Efforts to Improve the Community	2,306	1.57	0	New
Association for Promotion of Civic Rights	848	0.58	0	New
Grassroots Supervision	368	0.25	0	New
Workers' Movement Front	227	0.15	0	New
Democratic Society Alliance	179	0.12	0	New
Functional constituencies and appointees
Macau Business Interest Union			4	0
Macau Professional Interest Union			3	+1
Employees Association Joint Candidature Commission			2	0
Association for Promotion of Social Services and Education			1	New
Excellent Culture and Sports Union Association			2	0
Chief Executive appointees			7	0
Total	146,518	100.00	33	+4
Valid votes	146,518	96.47		
Invalid votes	1,083	0.71		
Blank votes	4,280	2.82		
Total votes	151,881	100.00		
Registered voters/turnout	276,034	55.02		
Source: Boletim Oficial

=== Geographical constituencies (14 seats) ===
Voting System: Closed party-list proportional representation with the Highest averages method.

Results of Macanese legislative election, 2013
Macau Geographical Constituency (澳門)

List No.	Party/Allegiance	Candidate(s)	Votes	Votes %	Seat(s) won
1	_{New Union for Macau's Development; Nova União para Desenvolvimento de Macau (NUDM)}	Angela Leong On Kei (elected); Wong Seng Hong; Fok Chi Chiu; Siu Yu Hong; Antonio Lei In Pun; Ho Chak San; Ng Sut I Szeto Tie Fung	13,093	8.94	1
2	_{New Macau Liberals; Liberais da Nova Macau (Liberais)}	Jason Chao Teng Hei; Chiang Meng Hin; Ieong Man Teng; Choi Chi Chio; Sio Chon Fong	3,227	2.20	
3	_{Association for Democracy Activism; Associação de Activismo para a Democracia (AAPD)}	Lee Kim Yun; Lam Meng; Ng Ka Lok; Chong Lai In	923	0.63	
4	_{Association for Promotion of Civic Rights; Associação de Promoção de direitos dos cidadãos (APDC)}	Hong Weng Kuan; Fong Kam Han; Iam Kam Chan; Lei Mei Teng	848	0.58	
5	_{New Democratic Macau Association; Associação de Novo Macau Democrática (ANMD)}	Au Kam San (elected); Sou Ka Hou; Lei Cheong Hou; Chan Lok Kei; Cheang Mio San; Chan Wai Chun	8,827	6.02	1
6	_{Union for Development; União para o Desenvolvimento (UPD)}	Kwan Tsui Hang (elected); Lam Lon Wai; Pai Ki Man; Sa Ang; Leong Wai Fong; Leong Pou U Leong Sun Iok; Tam Pou Iong; Cheong Man Fun	11,960	8.16	1
7	_{Civil Watch; Observatório Cívico (Cívico)}	Agnes Lam Iok Fong; Ng Man Yun; Rui Miguel Rebelo Leão; Cheong Chi Pong; Keong Wai Cheng	5,225	3.57	
8	_{Macau-Guangdong Union; União de Macau-Guangdong (UMG)}	Mak Soi Kun (elected); Zheng Anting (elected); Ho Song Fat; Lo Choi In; Ha Chon Ieng; Wu Hong Mui; Cheong Tat Wa; Leong Chan Kun; Pedro Ip; Lao Ka U	16,251	11.09	2
9	_{New Hope; Nova Esperança (NE)}	José Maria Pereira Coutinho (elected); Leong Veng Chai (elected); Melina Tam Leng I Linda Ieong Man I Che Sai Wang; Lam I Man; Ricardo da Luz; António Armando Joaquim da Rocha Teixeira; Cartar Singh Mann	13,130	8.96	2
10	_{Association for the Promotion of Democracy, Freedom, Human Rights and Rule of Law of Macau; Associação para Promoção da Democracia, Liberdade, Direitos Humanos e Estado de Direito de Macau (Ideais de Macau, IM)}	Cheong Weng Fat; Carl Ching Lok Suen; Cheong Kuok Seng; Chan Kam Fa; Hong Man Tei; Si Sok On	1,006	0.69	
11	_{Association for Joint Efforts to Improve the Community; Associação Esforço Juntos para Melhorar a Comunidade (Melhorar a Comunidade; MAC)}	Pun Chi Meng; Ho Tin Ka; Cheung Shek Chiu; Fong Lai Meng; Ip Chi Leng	2,306	1.57	
12	_{Alliance for Change; Aliança Pr’a Mudança (MUDAR)}	Melinda Chan Mei Yi (elected); Wu Kam Hon; Wu Keng Kuong; Lei On Teng; Mio I Chong da Silva; Cheong Ho Ian; Hong Lai Kei; Iu Hei Man; Lam Pui Ieng; Fong Kin Fu	8,755	5.98	1
13	_{United Citizens Association of Macau; Associação dos Cidadãos Unidos de Macau (ACUM)}	Chan Meng Kam (elected); Si Ka Lom (elected); Song Pek Kei (elected); Vivian Lou Io Pin; Loi Chi On; Chan Tak Seng; Chan Iat Peng; Lei Ip Kan; Ao Ieong Kuong Kao; Lou Ho Ian; Chan Hio Loi; Io Chao U U Kuai Hong; Hoi Long Tong	26,426	18.04	3
14	_{Union for Promoting Progress; União Promotora Para o Progresso (UPP)}	Ho Ion Sang (elected); Wong Kit Cheng (elected); Cheung Kin Chung; Ma Kin Chung; Ma Kin Cheong; Au Ka Fai; Sio Fu Pak; Leong Hong Sai; Iun Ioc Va; Chon Chong; Ao Ieong Ut Seng; Cheang Iok	15,815	10.79	2
15	_{Workers' Movement Front; Frente do Movimento Operário (Movimento Operário, MO)}	Leong Seak; Chio Man Cheng; Wong Nai Seong; Cham Choi Ha; Chio Chun Tai	227	0.15	
16	_{Supervision by the Lower Class; Supervisão pela Classe Baixa (SPCB)}	Lee Sio Kuan; Chan Kam Kuong; Tou Cong Meng; Loi Chong Pan; Kuan Chi Hong; Wu Iok Kuan; Lei Chi Peng; Fong Hong Tak; Chong Sio U	368	0.25	
17	_{Democratic Society Alliance; Aliança da Democracia de Sociedade (ALDES)}	Lei Man Chao; Ng Sek Io; Ho Heng Kuok; Ng Cheok Hei; Jose Kuok Cheok Man; Leong In Pok; Chong Seak Long; Kuok Kam Ian	179	0.12	
18	_{Innovative Action; Ações inovadoras (Ações inovadoras, AI)}	Kou Ngon Fong; Lai Man Fai; Tong Weng Io; Cheong Hoi Kuan	1,642	1.12	
19	_{Prosperous Democratic Macau Association; Associação de Próspero Macau Democrático (APMD)}	António Ng Kuok Cheong (elected); Paul Chan Wai Chi; Lei Kuok Keong; Cheong Wai Kit; Lei Kuok Fu; Kong Shun Mei	10,987	7.50	1
20	_{Caring for Macau; Cuidados para Macau (CPM)}	Kuan Vai Lam; Lou Kit Long; Cheang Un Fan; Song Wai Kit; Lei Chong Sam; Ao Sut In; Ana Maria Manhão Sou; Wong Chi Kuong	5,323	3.63	
TOTAL			146,518	100	14

=== Functional constituencies (12 seats) ===
Business (4 seats)
Party/Allegiance	List No.	Candidate(s)	Elected
_{Macau Business Interest Union; União dos Interesses Empresariais de Macau (OMKC)}	1	Ho Iat Seng	walkover
_{Macau Business Interest Union; União dos Interesses Empresariais de Macau (OMKC)}	2	Kou Hoi In	walkover
_{Macau Business Interest Union; União dos Interesses Empresariais de Macau (OMKC)}	3	Cheang Chi Keong	walkover
_{Macau Business Interest Union; União dos Interesses Empresariais de Macau (OMKC)}	4	José Chui Sai Peng	unopposed
Labor (2 seats)
_{Employees Association Joint Candidature Commission; Comissão Conjunta da Candidatura das Associações de Empregados (CCCAE)}	1	Lam Heong Sang	walkover
_{Employees Association Joint Candidature Commission; Comissão Conjunta da Candidatura das Associações de Empregados (CCCAE)}	2	Lei Cheng I	unopposed
Professionals (3 seats)
_{Macau Professional Interest Union; União dos Interesses Profissionais de Macau (OMCY)}	1	Chui Sai Cheong	walkover
_{Macau Professional Interest Union; União dos Interesses Profissionais de Macau (OMCY)}	2	Leonel Alberto Alves	walkover
_{Macau Professional Interest Union; União dos Interesses Profissionais de Macau (OMCY)}	3	Chan Iek Lap	unopposed
Welfare and Education (1 seat)
_{Association for Promotion of Social Services and Education; Associação de Promoção do Serviço Social e Educação (APSSE)}	1	Chan Hong	unopposed
Culture and Sport (2 seats)
_{Excellent Culture and Sports Union Association; Associação União Cultural e Desportiva Excelente (União Excelente, UE)}	1	Victor Cheung Lup Kwan	walkover
_{Excellent Culture and Sports Union Association; Associação União Cultural e Desportiva Excelente (União Excelente, UE)}	2	Chan Chak Mo	walkover

=== Nominated Members (7 seats) ===
Members appointed by the Chief Executive Fernando Chui Sai On

- Fong Chi Keong
- Vong Hin Fai
- Dominic Sio Chi Wai
- Ma Chi Seng
- Tsui Wai Kwan
- Tommy Lau Veng Seng
- Tong Io Cheng

== See also ==
- Elections in Macau
- Legislative Assembly of Macau
