= 2009 Macanese legislative election =

- 20 September 2009
- 12 of the 29 seats in the Legislative Assembly
Party	Leader	Vote %	Seats	+/–
Pro-Beijing parties
UPD	Kwan Tsui-hang	14.88	2	0
ACUM	Chan Meng Kam	12.00	2	0
NMDU	Leong On-kei	9.94	1	0
UNIPRO	Ho Ion-sang	9.90	1	−1
UGM	Mak Soi-kun	7.30	1	New
MUDAR	Melinda Chan	5.54	1	New
Pro-democracy parties
ANM	Antonio Ng	19.34	3	+1
NE	José Pereira Coutinho	9.10	1	0
This lists parties that won seats. See the complete results below.
President before	President after
Susana Chou; OMKC	Lau Cheok Va; CCCAE

Legislative elections were held in Macau on 20 September 2009. The official campaign began on 5 September, and several candidates received warnings from the Electoral Affairs Commission for having begun campaign activities beforehand.

As in 2005, there are 29 seats, only 12 of which are elected by universal suffrage under a peculiar divisor method. The rest are "elected" by the functional "constituencies" or appointed by the Chief Executive.

== Pro-democracy lists ==
This year, there are four lists advocating universal suffrage and political reforms.

In both 2001 and 2005, the New Democratic Macau Association, also referred as the democrats by local media, received the highest number of votes. Due to the divisors (1,2,4,8,...) employed in their peculiar divisor method, they only managed to win 2 seats on both occasions (they would have achieved 3 seats had the original d'Hondt formula been used instead). Because of this, they split into two lists, namely Associação de Próspero Macau Democrático (APMD) and Associação Novo Macau Democrático (ANMD), contesting the election with the same manifesto. Similar strategies have been used by the Democratic Party of Hong Kong in the Hong Kong legislative elections, with mixed successes. APMD is led by Antonio Ng while Au Kam San leads ANMD, which means both lists have outgoing deputies (deputados) as their leading candidates.

The democrats campaign for one man one vote for the CE in 2014 (with nominations from the 300-member election committee) and direct election with public nominations in 2019. For the AL, they suggest abolishing all indirectly elected seats in 2013 and the end of appointed seats by the CE in 2017.

Agnes Lam, a local writer and an assistant professor of the University of Macau, leads the newly formed Observatório Cívico campaigning for direct election for the chief executive (CE) in 2019 and a directly elected legislative assembly (AL) by 2023. In addition to universal suffrage, Observatório Cívico also campaigns for reforming the electoral system by introducing multiple votes. She has also spoken against self-censorship in the local media and emphasised the importance of freedom of press. Some have questioned her pro-democracy views, with her being vice president of the pro-Beijing Macao Youth Foundation.

Associação de Activismo para a Democracia, the most radical list of the four, concentrates on campaigning for universal suffrage for both CE and AL by 2019, but is less concerned about other issues. Their leading candidates were removed by the security during a CCAC (Comissariado Contra a Corrupção) rally for "clean election", which was represented by all 16 lists, after shouting slogans on stage. They only received 654 votes (0.52%) in 2005.

=== Ng Seng Fong's pullout ===
The 4th candidate of Au Kam San's list (Associação Novo Macau Democrático or ANDM), Ng Seng Fong has resigned and pulled out from the election on 16 September. A local Chinese language newspaper revealed that Ng was given a 3-year sentence in July for frauds dating back to 2005. Ng claimed that she herself did not know about the said court case and only found out about it on the internet. It is unclear how the court case carried out without her knowledge given that she commutes from Zhuhai to Macau frequently using her BIR (Macau ID card) to go through the custom. She has now filed an appeal against the decision. The police has launched an investigation into the leaks of these reports. It is claimed that only a handful of officers have access to the said records.

== The pro-Beijing lists ==
The pro-Beijing lists can be divided into two categories, the ones with links to the business sector (especially the gaming industry) and those with traditionalist backgrounds.

This year, they turn their attention to the economic crisis which has hit the gambling industry of Macau particularly badly. União para o Desenvolvimento emphasises on the need to diversify the local economy as well as reforming labour laws. União Macau-Guangdong on the other hand campaigns for greater cooperation between Macau and mainland China. Family reunification for immigrants from mainland China is also a campaign issues for various lists.

Some of the pro-Beijing lists include political reform in their manifestos. However, they do not appear to support universal suffrage in the near future. UPP for example suggests the enlargement of election committee which would continue to elect the chief executive indirectly. AACPP and Aliança P’ra Mudança go further by claiming that Macau is "not ready" for universal suffrage.

=== Gaming industry ===
The gaming industry has a strong presence in the election. Casinos in Macau currently employ 50,000 people, it is therefore expected that at least four seats would go to candidates with links to the industry according to a study carried out by Hong Kong Baptist University. Angela Leong, the director of STDM is expected to be re-elected under the list Nova União para Desenvolvimento de Macau. Melinda Chan, the leading candidate for Aliança Pr'a Mudança, has also worked in the gaming and hotel industry. She campaigns against raising tax rates for the casinos and insists that casinos should bare no social responsibilities. Chan Meng Kam, the owner of Golden Dragon casino, together with Ung Choi Kun are running for re-election under the list Associação dos Cidadãos Unidos de Macau. They came second in 2005, but it was later revealed that their list was linked to a vote buying case for which 7 people were sent to prison.

The election commission ruled that it is illegal to display campaign materials in casinos. However, the list of Angela Leong has ignored this ruling and continued to display political posters in Grand Lisboa, a casino owned by STDM.

== Macanese candidates ==
A unified list consisting of mainly candidates with Portuguese descent (Macanese), some born in Macau and others in Portugal, contests in this legislative election, under the name Voz Plural - Gentes de Macau. The list also has Chinese members. The platform calls for the protection of the heritage of Macau in a modern context of multiculturalism. One of the main issue they campaign for is to protect rights of foreign workers in RAEM, in bid to win votes from the sizeable Philippines and Indonesian communities. Voz Plural is the only list which campaigns in roughly equal proportions in Chinese, Portuguese and English (see below).

The top two candidates of Nova Esperança, José Pereira Coutinho and Rita Santos, are both Macanese. However, unlike Voz Plural, Nova Esperança concentrates on issues of labour rights and social issues. The outgoing deputy José Pereira Coutinho has proposed, but without success, the trade union bill twice during his time in the assembly so far.

Both lists support gradual political reforms and increasing the number of directly elected deputies in AL. However, their programs are less ambitious than the pro-democracy lists. In particular, Voz Plural does not campaign for universal suffrage according to their manifesto, due to a perception that such claim is not realistic for the next 4 years, proposing instead the increase of directly elected members from 12 to 18.

== Languages ==
There is no restriction on the choice of language used in the campaigns. Traditionally, candidates concentrate on winning votes from the Chinese majority. With the participation of Voz Plural, more efforts are being made to translate manifestos into minority languages this year. For the first time, ANMD (and APMD) will make use of its campaign air time on the Portuguese channel of TDM. União Promotora para o Progresso (UPP) also campaigns in both Chinese and Portuguese. Associação de Apoio à Comunidade e Proximidade do Povo (AACPP), Observatório Cívico and Voz Plural all campaigns in three languages (Chinese, Portuguese and English). AACPP even sends out leaflets in Braille.

The use of Portuguese became an important election issue this year. During a debate between the two leading Macanese candidates, Casimiro Pinto and José Pereira Coutinho, organised by Ponto Final, discrimination against monoglot Portuguese was discussed. Apart from Voz Plural, Aliança Pr’a Mudança also supports multilingualism. Their education policies include promoting bilingual (Chinese and Portuguese) teaching in Macau. UPP also supports bilingualism favouring stronger ties with other lusophone trading partners.

== Controversies ==
=== UPP's false start ===
União Promotora Para o Progresso (UPP), a list associated to the Kaifong association, has breached election regulations by distributing campaign materials outside the legal campaign period (5 to 18 September). On 20 August, Au Kam San of the ANMD made an official complaint to the electoral commission after UPP distributed leaflets on the street and published campaign advertisements with pictures of the UUP candidates in a local magazine, União Geral das Associações de Moradores de Macau. The said magazine was published with subsidies from Fundação Macau. The democrats accused Fundação Macau of financing "illegal" campaigns using public funds. However, the president of the electoral commission, Vasco Fong, ruled that the actions of UUP were due to ignorance and refused to punish the list.

=== Internet war ===
There have been reports that some candidates received malicious emails containing a virus that would delete all the data of victims' computers. Observatórico Cívico claimed that they received tens of such messages. Many rumours have been spread on various internet forums. Many accusations were made against the democrats on the CTM forums, including claims of Au Kam San's link to Falun Gong.

=== Smears against Kwan Tsui Hang ===
Anonymous posters were displayed throughout the city making false accusations against the outgoing deputy and the leader of União Para o Desenvolvimento, Kwan Tsui Hang. The posters claimed that Kwan was against government's recent cash relief scheme and would rather allocate the funds for corruption purposes. Kwan has denied all such claims. Despite having complained to the election commission, the posters continued to appear on the streets asserting people were making the wrong choice (for electing Kwan).

== Results ==
There were 16 lists, down 2 from 2005. In one form or another, 9 lists have contested in the 2005 election. The ballot order was announced on 29 July.

The election commissioner delayed the announcement of the final results after recording a large number of spoilt votes. On the first count, there were 6,539 spoilt votes, but 5,467 of them have been validated on the recount. Melinda Chan, the leading candidate of Aliança Pr'a Mudança, immediately filed a complaint against the decision arguing that according to electoral law, a tick should be put inside the designated box for the vote to be valid. On 28 September, the court of last repeal (o Tribunal de Última Instância) ruled in favour of Melinda Chan and concluded that only 41 of the original spoilt votes should be valid. The ruling does not change the overall outcome of the election with the 12 original elected deputies remaining elected, but there is a slight change in the "ranking" of the lists.

The strategies of the democrats paid off, they managed to increase 1 seat which means there will be 4 pro-democracy deputies (including José Pereira Coutinho) in the new assembly. The traditionalists lost one seat despite both UPP and UPD increased their number of votes. In fact, UPD received the largest number of votes as a single list and saw the largest increase in votes. For the pro-business camp, there remain 5 deputies, 4 of which from the gaming industry. Analysts pointed out that there has not been a huge change in the make up of the AL which continues to be dominated by the pro-Beijing camp.

Party	Votes	%	Seats	+/–
Union for Development	21,098	14.88	2	0
Macau United Citizens Association	17,014	12.00	2	0
New Macau Development Union	14,099	9.94	1	0
Union for Promoting Progress	14,044	9.90	1	–1
Macau-Guangdong Union	10,348	7.30	1	New
Alliance for Change	7,857	5.54	1	New
Union for Progress and Development	5,389	3.80	0	New
Association for Helping the Community and Engagement with the People	2,334	1.65	0	0
Social Justice Team	1,627	1.15	0	New
Pro-Beijing camp	93,810	66.16	8	–1
Prosperous Democratic Macau Association	16,424	11.58	2	–
New Hope	12,908	9.10	1	0
New Democratic Macau Association	11,024	7.77	1	–
Civil Watch	5,329	3.76	0	New
Association for Democracy Activism	1,141	0.80	0	0
Plural Voices – Peoples of Macau	905	0.64	0	New
Democratic Society Alliance	256	0.18	0	New
Pro-democracy camp	47,987	33.84	4	+1
Functional constituencies and appointees
Macau Business Interest Union			4	0
Employees Association Joint Candidature Commission			2	0
Macau Professional Interest Union			2	0
Excellent Culture and Sports Union Association			2	0
Chief Executive appointees			7	0
Total	141,797	100.00	29	0
Valid votes	141,797	95.16		
Invalid votes	6,498	4.36		
Blank votes	711	0.48		
Total votes	149,006	100.00		
Registered voters/turnout	248,708	59.91		
Source: Boletim Oficial

=== Geographical constituencies ===
Voting System: Closed party-list proportional representation with the Highest averages method.

Results of Macanese legislative election, 2009
Macau Geographical Constituency (澳門)

List No.	Party/Allegiance	Candidate(s)	Votes	Votes %	Seat(s) won
1	_{: Macau-Guangdong Union; União Macau-Guangdong; (UMG); }	Mak Soi Kun (elected); Sakhan Men; Ho Son Fat; Cheong Tat Wa; Anting Zheng; Ha Chon Ieng	10,348	7.30	1
2	_{: New Hope; Nova Esperança; (NE); }	José Maria Pereira Coutinho (elected); Rita Botelho dos Santos; Leong Veng Chai; Melina Tam Leng I; Leong Chi Pio; Cheong Io Fan; Jose Miguel De Sales da Silva; Ricardo Da Luz; Cartar Singh Mann	12,908	9.10	1
3	_{: Union for Progress and Development; União Para o Progresso e Desenvolvimento; (UPPD); }	Lai Cho Wai; Kuan Vai Lam; Choi Kam San; Wong Chi Kuong; Cheang Wai Tak; Ao Sut In; Ana Maria Mahão Sou; Lei Chong Sam	5,389	3.80	
4	_{: Prosperous Democratic Macau Association; Associação de Próspero Macau Democrático; (APMD); }	António Ng Kuok Cheong (elected); Paul Chan Wai Chi (elected); Chu Kuok Kun; Leong Pok Man; Chang Fu Tak; Kong Shun Mei	16,424	11.58	2
5	_{: Alliance for Change; Aliança Pr'a Mudança; (MUDAR); }	Melinda Chan Mei Yi (elected)	7,857	5.54	1
6	_{: Civil Watch; Observatório Cívico; (Cívico); }	Lam Iok Fong; Wai Tong Kuan; Chu Cheok Son; Ng Man Yun; Leong Fong Hio	5,329	3.76	
7	_{: United Citizens Association of Macau; Associação dos Cidadãos Unidos de Macau; (ACUM); }	Chan Meng Kam (elected); Ung Choi Kun (elected); Ung Choi Kun; Iau Teng Pio; Chio Tak Wo; Ieong Tat Fu; Ng Ka Yui; Chong Tak Chi; Choi Meng Tat; Song Pek Kei	17,014	12.00	2
8	_{: "Social Justice" Team; Equipa de "Justiça Social"; (EJS); }	In Kam Seng; Wong Sok Fan; Estanislau Carlos do Rosario; Lam Kam Iam; Angelina Maria De Carvalho Lei; Che Su Peng; Pedro Tam Wai Keong; Chao Oi Leng; Mak Sio Ieng; Filomena Maria Wan Nogueira	1,627	1.15	
9	_{: Association for Democracy Activism; Associação de Activismo para a Democracia; (AAPD); }	Ng Sek Io; Lee Kin Yun; Ho Heng Kuok; Ho Iat Sang; Lai Chi Meng	1,141	0.80	
10	_{: New Union for Macau's Development; Nova União para Desenvolvimento de Macau; (NUDM); }	Angela Leong On Kei (elected); Wong Seng Hong; Fok Chi Chiu; Siu Yu Hong; Antonio Lei In Pun; Ho Chak San	14,099	9.94	1
11	_{: Democratic Society Alliance; Aliança da Democracia de Sociedade; (ADS); }	Lei Man Chao; Tang Kuok Keong; Leong Cheok Long; Chong Seak Long; Leong In Pok; Kouk Kam Ian	256	0.18	
12	_{: Union for Development; União Para O Desenvolvimento; (UPD); }	Kwan Tsui Hang (elected); Lee Chong Cheng (elected); Uk Iok Sio; Lau Gar Bo; Lam Lon Wai; Kong Hio U; Un Oi Mou; Leong Pou U; Tam Pou Iong; Cheong Man Fun	21,098	14.88	2
13	_{: Union for Promoting Progress; União Promotora Para o Progresso; (UPP); }	Ho Ion Sang (elected); Chan Hong; Lao Nag Fong; Leong Hong Sai; Iong Sio Hong; Sou Heng Fai; Lam Un Mui; Kou Weng Kim; Ng Wan Sin; Wan Wing Kee; Iun Ioc Va; Lo Iok Kuan	14,044	9.90	1
14	_{: Plural Voices – Peoples of Macau; Voz Plural – Gentes de Macau; (VPGM); }	Casimiro de Jesus Pinto; Jorge Alexandre Fernandes Godinho; Jenny Oliveros Lao; Cristna Pereira Carion; Mário Alberto De Brito Lima Évora; Isabela Bento Manhão; Rodantes Valdoria Quejano; Pedro Manuel Barata de Oliveira Lobo; Sharoz Datarama Pernencar; Guiomar Madeira da Silva Pedruco; Chiang Tat Chi; Herman Do Lago Comandante	905	0.64	
15	_{: New Democratic Macau Association; Associação de Novo Macau Democrático; (ANMD); }	Au Kam San (elected); Chao Teng Hei; Chan Wa Keong; Ng Seng Fong; Ching Meng Hin; Cheang Mio San	11,024	7.77	1
16	_{: Association for Helping the Community and Engagement with the People; Associação de Apoio à Comunidade e Proximidade do Povo; (AACPP); }	Pun Chi Meng; Leong Kam Chun; Chan Yuek Bong; Tong Noi Tong; Tereza Lai	2,334	1.65	
TOTAL			141,797	100.0	12

=== Functional constituencies (10 seats) ===
Business (4 seats)
Party/Allegiance	List No.	Candidate(s)	Elected
_{: Macau Business Interest Union; União dos Interesses Empresariais de Macau; }	1	Ho Iat Seng	unopposed
_{: Macau Business Interest Union; União dos Interesses Empresariais de Macau; }	2	Kou Hoi In	unopposed
_{: Macau Business Interest Union; União dos Interesses Empresariais de Macau; }	3	Cheang Chi Keong	walkover
_{: Macau Business Interest Union; União dos Interesses Empresariais de Macau; }	4	Fong Chi Keong	unopposed
Labor (2 seats)
_{: Employees Association Joint Candidature Commission; Comissão Conjunta da Candidatura das Associações de Empregados; }	1	Lau Cheok Va	walkover
_{: Employees Association Joint Candidature Commission; Comissão Conjunta da Candidatura das Associações de Empregados; }	2	Lam Heong Sang	unopposed
Professionals (2 seats)
_{: Macau professional Interest Union; União dos Interesses Profissionais de Macau; }	1	Chui Sai Cheong	walkover
_{: Macau professional Interest Union; União dos Interesses Profissionais de Macau; }	2	Leonel Alberto Alves	walkover
Welfare, Culture, Education and Sport (2 seats)
_{: Excellent Culture and Sports Union Association; Associação União Cultural e Desportiva Excelente; }	1	Victor Cheung Lup Kwan	walkover
_{: Excellent Culture and Sports Union Association; Associação União Cultural e Desportiva Excelente; }	2	Chan Chak Mo	walkover

=== Nominated Members (7 seats) ===
Members appointed by the Chief Executive Fernando Chui Sai On

- José Chui Sai Peng
- Ho Sio Kam
- Tommy LauVeng Seng
- Dominic Sio Chi Wa
- Tong Io Cheng
- Tsui Wai Kwan
- Vong Hin Fai

== Turnout ==
28 polling stations were open from 9am to 9pm. A total of 149,006 (59.91% of registered voters) people voted, a record high. The regional breakdowns are as follows.

Region	Voters	Turnout
Macau Peninsula	138,963	60.03
Taipa	9,034	57.63
Coloane	1,009	65.43
