= ACUM =

ACUM may refer to:

- ACUM Platforma DA și PAS, or NOW Platform DA and PAS, a political alliance in Moldova
- Partidul ACUM, a political party in Romania
- Society of Authors, Composers and Music Publishers in Israel (Hebrew abbreviation "ACUM")
- United Citizens Association of Macau
