= City University of Macau =

Private university in Taipa, Macau

- 澳門城市大學; Universidade da Cidade de Macau
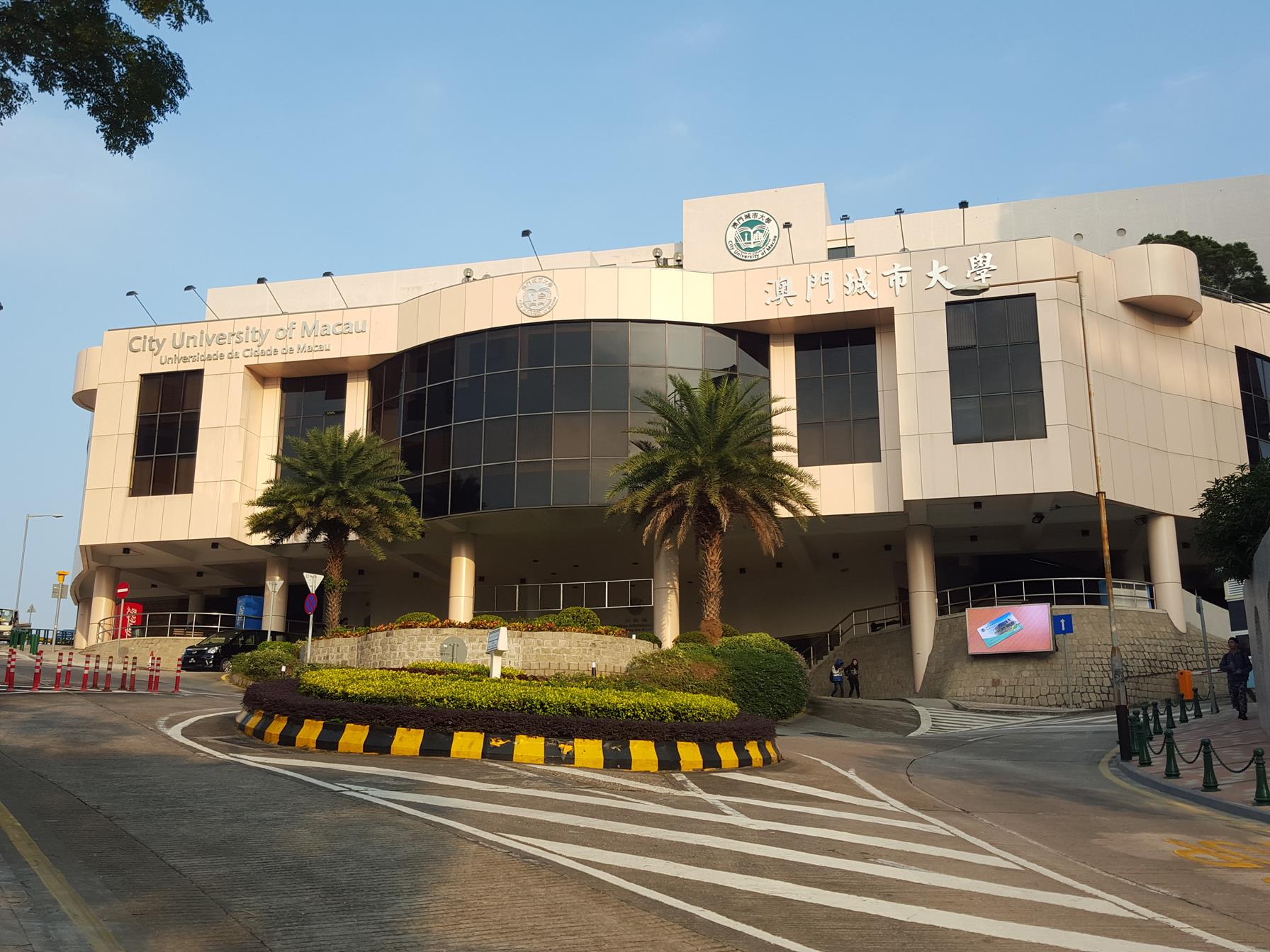
- Other names: 澳城大, CityU Macau
- Type: Private
- Established: 1981 (as University of East Asia); 1992 (as Asia International Open University (Macau)); 2011 (as City University of Macau)
- Academic affiliations: UNWTO-TedQual; GHMUA
- Chancellor: Chan Meng Kam (陳明金)
- Rector: Jun Liu
- Faculty: 300+
- Students: 8500+
- Undergraduates: 4800+
- Postgraduates: 2600+
- Doctoral students: 1100+
- Location: Avenida Padre Tomás Pereira; Taipa, Macau
- Campus: 3.8 ha (9.4 acres)
- Colors: Green
- Website: www.cityu.edu.mo

Chinese name
- Traditional Chinese: 澳門城市大學
- Simplified Chinese: 澳门城市大学
Transcriptions
Standard Mandarin
- Hanyu Pinyin: Àomén Chéngshì Dàxué
Yue: Cantonese
- Jyutping: ou3 mun4*2 sing4 si5 daai6 hok6

Portuguese name
- Portuguese: Universidade da Cidade de Macau

The City University of Macau (CityU) is a private university in Taipa, Macau, China.

The university's predecessor was the Graduate School and Open College of the private University of East Asia established in 1981. After the acquisition of the University of East Asia and its Polytechnic College by the Government of Macau in 1988, the Graduate School and Open College remained to be private-owned and merged to form East Asia Open College in 1991. The college changed its name to Asia International Open University (Macau) in 1992. The institute changed to its current name in 2011. The university offers doctorate, master, bachelor's degree programmes, as well as pre-college study courses.

== Campus ==
The university was located in a commercial complex called the Royal Center Building on Avenida do Dr. Rodrigo Rodrigues. In 2015, the university headquarters moved back to the original site of the University of Macau. The Taipa Campus is located in the heart of the South China Sea, the Pearl River and Macao. It is a comprehensive University located at the highest altitude in Macao.

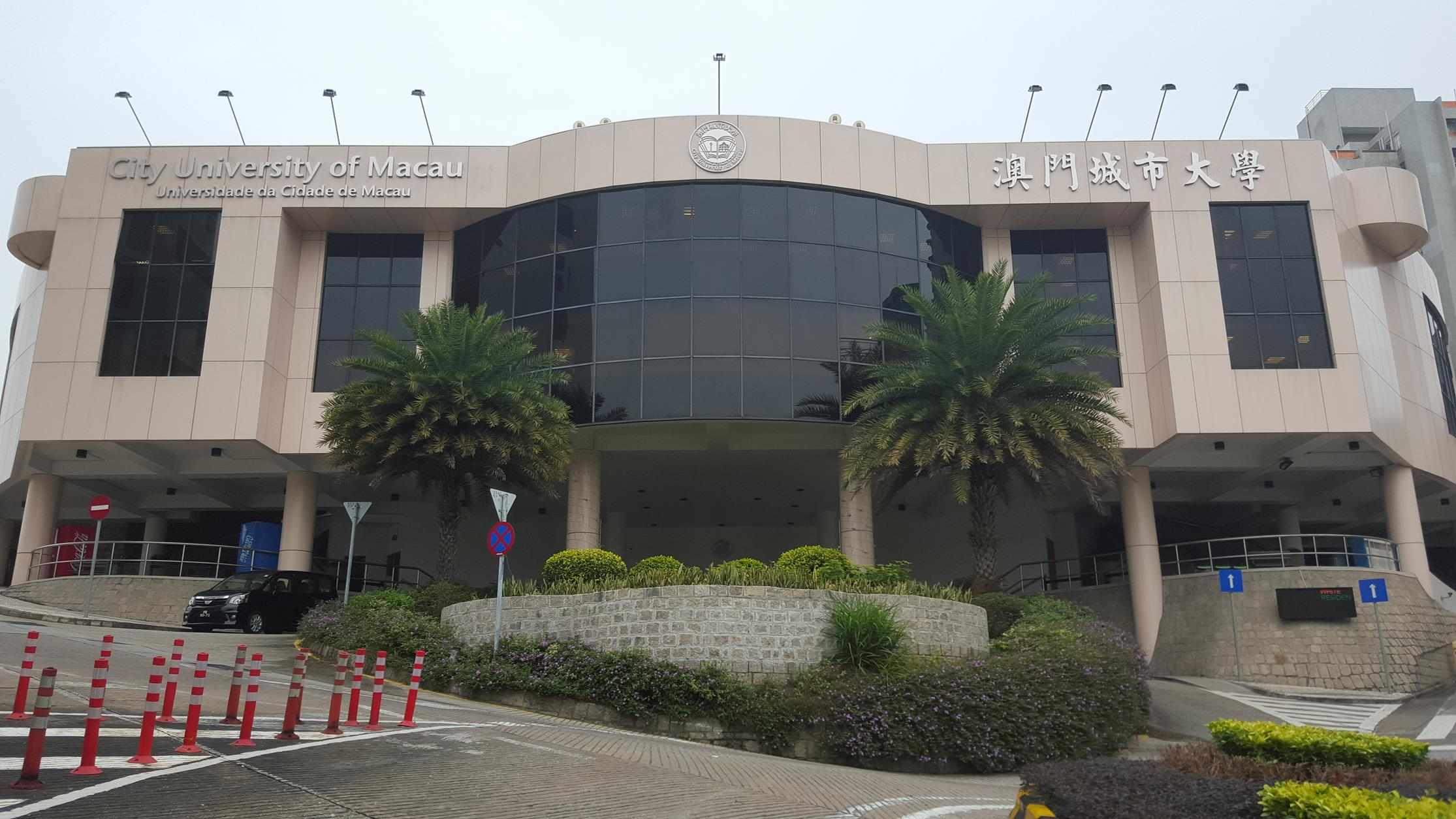
Administrative building

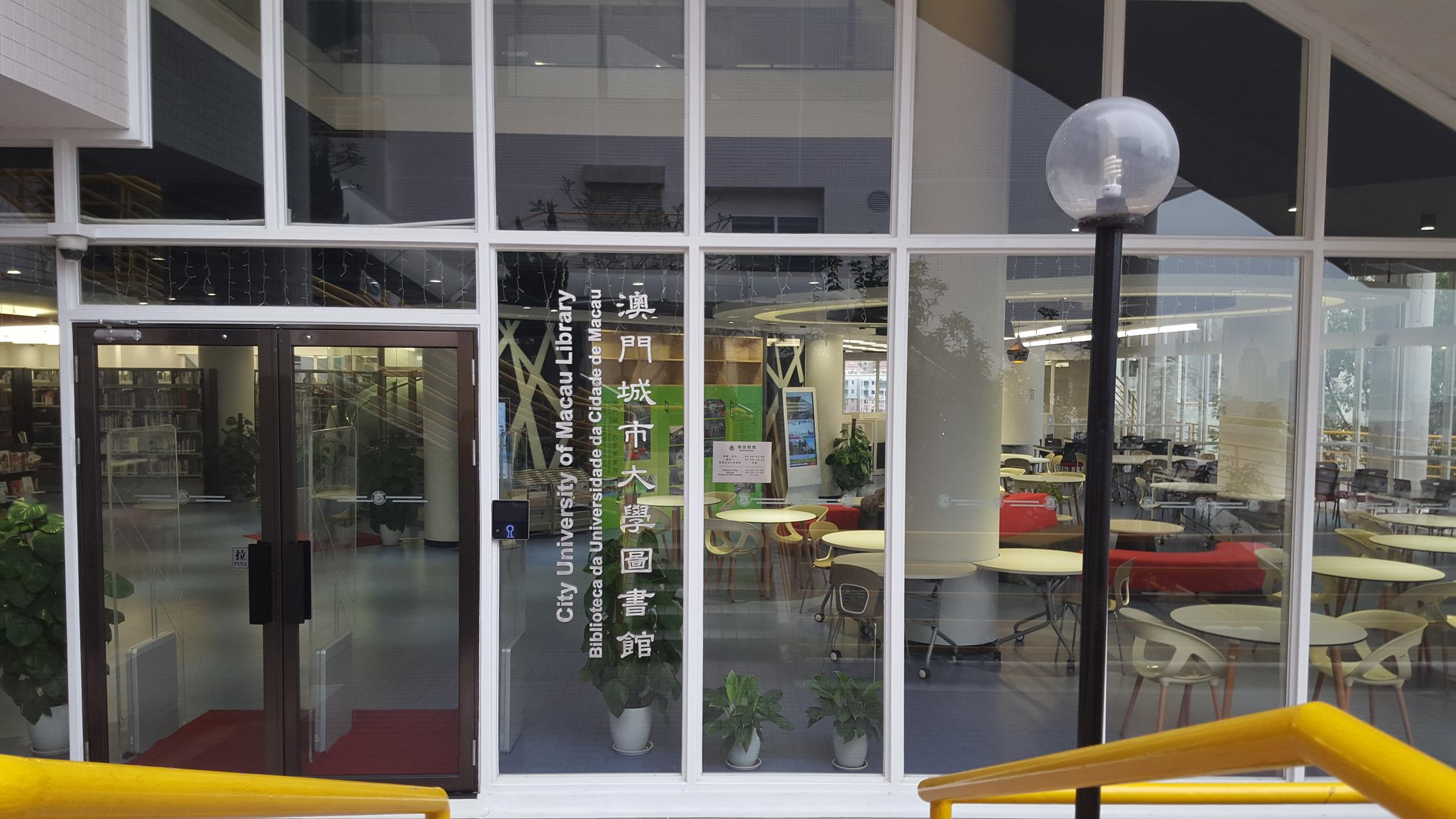
Library
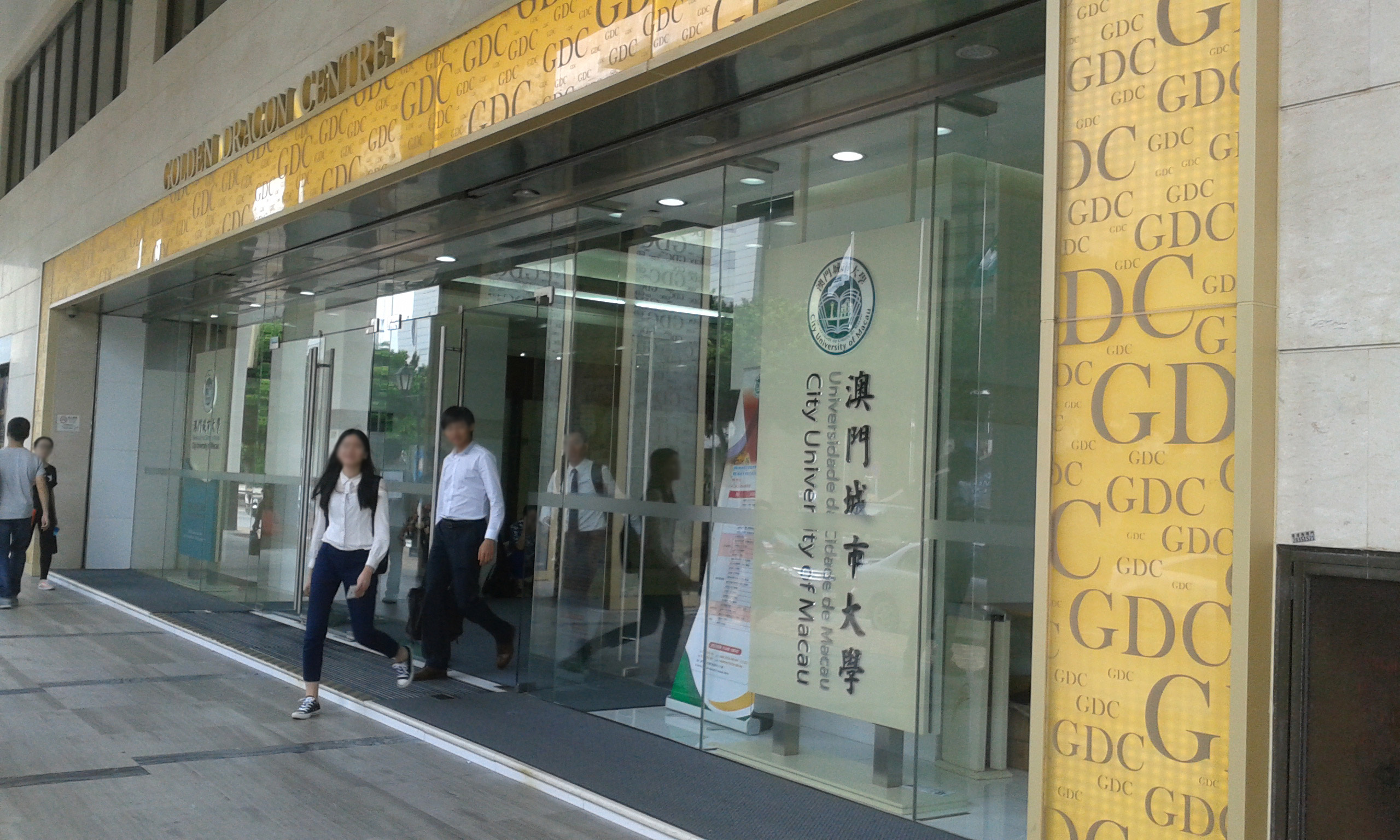
Golden Dragon Centre Campus

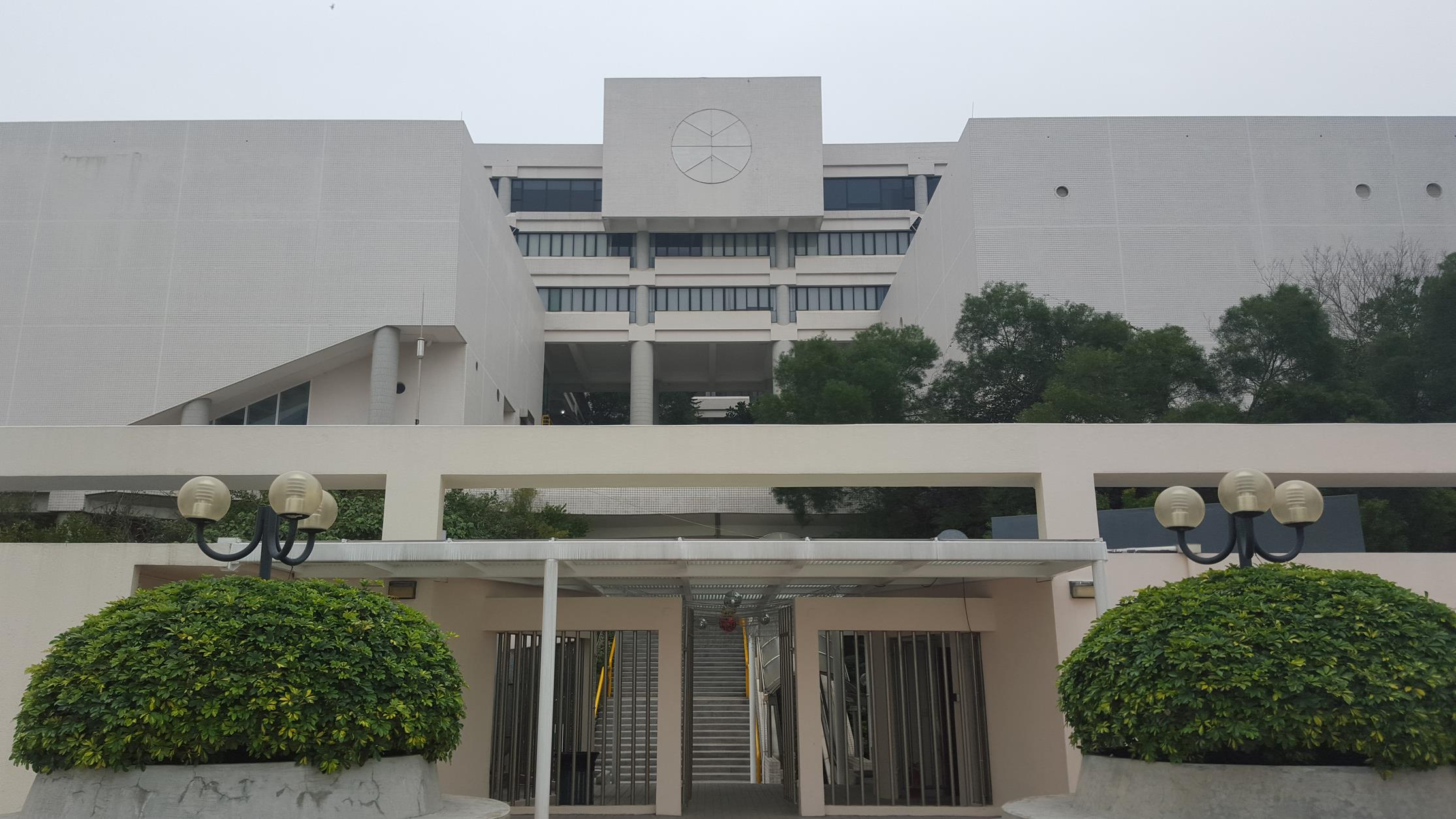
Taipa Campus

== Degree programmes ==
CityU Macau offers over 40 Chinese, English and Portuguese-medium programmes to 8,500+ students through nine faculties:

=== Bachelor's Degree Programmes ===
==== Faculty of Business ====
- Bachelor of Business Administration

==== Faculty of Data Science ====
- Bachelor of Intelligence Technology and Services
- Bachelor of Computer Science

==== Faculty of Finance ====
- Bachelor of Applied Economics

==== Faculty of Humanities and Social Sciences ====
- Bachelor of Social Work
- Bachelor of English
- Bachelor of Portuguese

==== Faculty of Innovation and Design ====
- Bachelor of Arts in Design

==== Faculty of International Tourism and Management ====
- Bachelor of International Tourism and Hotel Management

=== Master's Degree Programmes ===
==== Faculty of Business ====
- Master of Business Administration

==== Faculty of Data Science ====
- Master of Data Science

==== Faculty of Finance ====
- Master of Science in Finance

==== Faculty of Humanities and Social Sciences ====
- Master of Cultural Industries Management
- Master of Applied Psychology
- Master of Social Work

==== Faculty of Innovation and Design ====
- Master of Design
- Master of Fine Arts
- Master of Urban Planning and Design

==== Faculty of International Tourism and Management ====
- Master of International Hospitality and Tourism Management
- Master of International Hotel Management

==== School of Education ====
- Master of Education
- Master of Teaching and Learning Studies

==== School of Law ====
- Master of Law

==== Institute for Research on Portuguese-Speaking Countries ====
- Master of Arts in Portuguese-Speaking Countries Studies

=== Doctoral Degree Programmes ===
==== Faculty of Business ====
- Doctor of Business Administration

==== Faculty of Data Science ====
- Doctor of Philosophy in Data Science

==== Faculty of Finance ====
- Doctor of Philosophy in Finance

==== Faculty of Humanities and Social Sciences ====
- Doctor of Applied Psychology
- Doctor of Philosophy in Cultural Industry Studies

==== Faculty of Innovation and Design ====
- Doctor of Philosophy in Arts Studies
- Doctor of Philosophy in Design
- Doctor of Urban Planning and Design

==== Faculty of International Tourism and Management ====
- Doctor of Philosophy in International Tourism Management

==== School of Education ====
- Doctor of Philosophy in Education

==== Institute for Research on Portuguese-Speaking Countries ====
- Doctor of Philosophy in Portuguese-Speaking Countries Studies

== See also ==
- Education in Macau
