= Melinda Chan =

Macau politician

Melinda Chan Chan Mei Yi
- 陳美儀
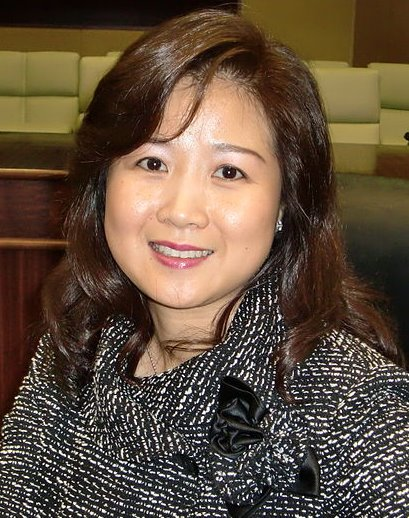

Member of the Legislative Assembly
- In office 16 October 2009 – 15 October 2017
- Constituency: Macau (Directly elected)

Personal details
- Born: September 2, 1965 (age 60) Portuguese Macau

Melinda Chan Mei Yi (Chinese: 陳美儀; born 10 March 1965 in Macau) is a member of the Legislative Assembly of Macau. She ran for Legislative Assembly in the 2009 legislative election. She is a member of Alliance for Change a pan-establishment party in Macau.

== Election results ==
Year	Candidate	Hare quota	Mandate	List Votes	List Pct
2009	Melinda Chan (MUDAR)	7,857	№12/12	7,857	5.54%
2013	Melinda Chan (MUDAR)	8,755	№10/14	8,755	5.98%
2017	Melinda Chan (MUDAR)	8,183	∅ - Lost	8,183	5.98%

== See also ==
- List of members of the Legislative Assembly of Macau
