= Leong On Kei =

Macanese politician

Angela Leong On Kei
- 梁安琪
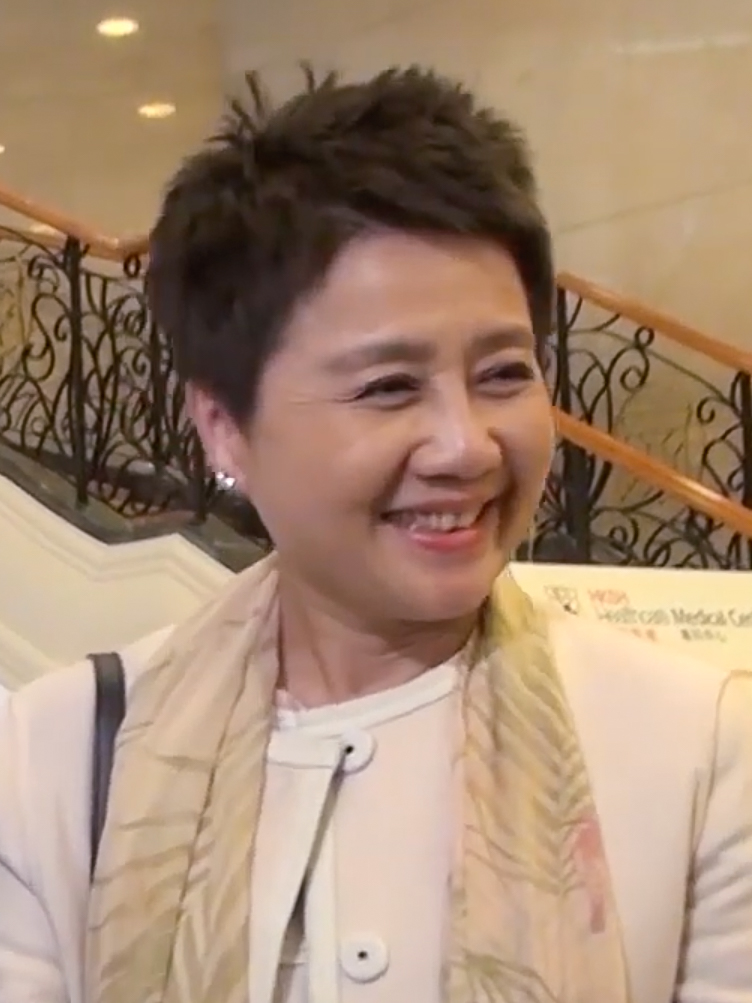
- Leong in 2018

Member of the Legislative Assembly
- Incumbent
- Assumed office 16 October 2021
- Constituency: Culture and Sport
- In office 25 September 2005 – 15 October 2021
- Constituency: Macau (Directly elected)

Personal details
- Born: Xuan Weiling (禤偉玲); 23 March 1961 (age 65) Guangzhou, China
- Spouse: Stanley Ho (m. 1988; died 2020)
- Children: 4
- Occupation: Member of the Legislative Assembly of Macau

Angela Leong On Kei (Chinese: 梁安琪; pinyin: Liáng Ānqí; Jyutping: Loeng^{4} On^{1}-kei^{4}; born 23 March 1961) is a Macau billionaire businesswoman and politician. She is a member of the Legislative Council of Macau.

== Early life ==
Leong was born in Guangzhou, China with family roots in Sanshui, Guangdong.

== Career ==
In September 2017, she bought Aldwych House in London for about £250 million. As of September 2019, she had an estimated net worth of US$4.1 billion.

Leong founded Macau Sanshui Communal Association to provide social services to new immigrants. With the support of her husband to reflect the casino interests in the political scene, Leong entered electoral politics in 2005 and has then served as a directly elected legislator. The mobilization of both the working class and casino employees, a key building block of the Macau middle class, is key to Leong's political career.

She is the director of the Sociedade de Jogos de Macau, a casino company owned by Stanley Ho, since its founding and the managing director since December 2010, and the vice-chairman of the Macau Jockey Club.

With her new appointment as the chairperson of Po Leung Kuk, she has also become the supervisor of PLK Vicwood KT Chong Sixth Form College.

== Personal life ==
She met Stanley Ho, a Macau casino tycoon famous in the political and entertainment industries in Hong Kong and Macau, 40 years her senior, when she was a dance teacher in 1986. She became his fourth partner and had four children with him: Sabrina Ho, Arnaldo Ho, Mario Ho and Alice Ho.

== Election results ==
Year	Candidate	Hare quota	Mandate	List votes	List pct
2005	Angela Leong (AMD)	11,642	No.6/12	11,642	9.32%
2009	Angela Leong (NUDM)	14,099	No.4/12	14,099	9.94%
2013	Angela Leong (NUDM)	13,086	No.6/14	13,086	8.94%
2017	Angela Leong (NUDM)	10,447	No.7/14	10,447	6.05%

== See also ==
- List of members of the Legislative Assembly of Macau
