= Ho Ion Sang =

- 何潤生
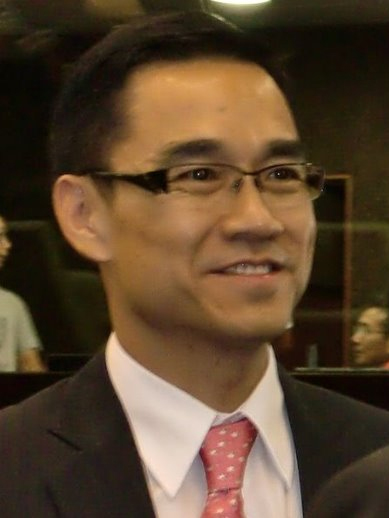

Member of the Legislative Assembly
- Incumbent
- Assumed office 16 October 2021
- Constituency: Welfare and Education
- In office 20 September 2009 – 15 October 2021
- Constituency: Macau (Directly elected)

Personal details
- Born: September 2, 1961 (age 64) Portuguese Macau

Ho Ion Sang (Chinese: 何潤生; born 2 September 1961 in Macau) is a member of the Legislative Assembly of Macau. He ran for Legislative Assembly in the 2009 legislative election. He is a member of Union for Promoting Progress a pan-establishment party in Macau.

== Election results ==
Year	Candidate	Hare quota	Mandate	List Votes	List Pct
2009	Ho Ion Sang (UPP)	14,044	№5/12	14,044	9.90%
2013	Ho Ion Sang (UPP)	7,907	№3/14	15,815	10.80%
2017	Ho Ion Sang (UPP)	12,333	№5/14	12,333	7.15%

== See also ==
- List of members of the Legislative Assembly of Macau
