= Song Pek Kei =

Chinese politician

- 宋碧琪

Member of the Legislative Assembly
- Incumbent
- Assumed office 15 September 2013
- Constituency: Macau (Directly elected)

Personal details
- Born: June 20, 1985 (age 40)
- Party: Macau United Citizens Association

Song Pek Kei (Chinese: 宋碧琪) is a member of the Legislative Assembly of Macau. She is the youngest lawmaker ever elected to the Legislative Assembly, at age 28 in 2013.

== Early life ==
She graduated from the University of Macao with a Bachelor of Laws degree.

== Election results ==
| Year | Candidate | Hare quota | Mandate | List Votes | List Pct |
|---|---|---|---|---|---|
| 2013 | Song Pek Kei (ACUM) | 6,597.5 | №13/14 | 26,385 | 18.02% |
| 2017 | Song Pek Kei (ACDM) | 10,099 | №8/14 | 10,103 | 5.85% |
