= Ponto Final =

Portuguese-language newspaper in Macau

- Type: Daily newspaper
- Founded: December 18, 1991
- Language: Portuguese language
- Headquarters: Macau
- Website: pontofinal-macau.com

Ponto Final (meaning Full Stop in English; Chinese: 句號報) is a Portuguese-language newspaper published daily in Macau, founded on December 18, 1991. It was known for its critical stance against the Rocha Vieira administration.

== History ==
Ponto Final was originally published weekly, but was later changed to a daily publication and has been published today. It added an English supplement in 1999.
