= José Pereira Coutinho =

Macanese politician

José Maria Pereira Coutinho ComM
- 高天賜
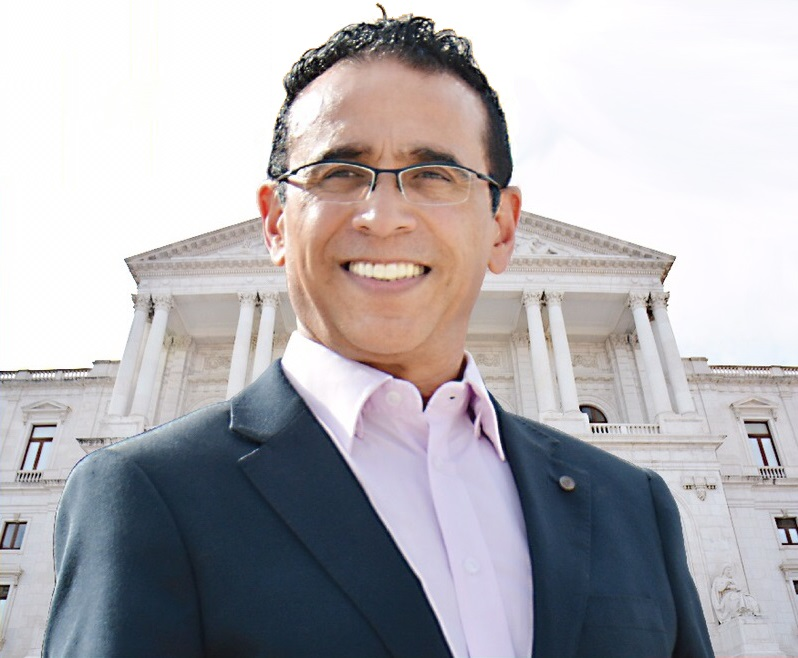

Member of the Legislative Assembly
- Incumbent
- Assumed office 25 September 2005
- Constituency: Macau (Directly elected)

Personal details
- Born: 22 July 1957 (age 69) Portuguese Macau
- Citizenship: Portuguese; Chinese (Macau)
- Party: New Hope (Macau); Nós, Cidadãos! (Portugal)
- Education: University of Macau (LLB)
- Awards: Commander of the Order of Merit

José Pereira Coutinho
- Traditional Chinese: 高天賜
- Simplified Chinese: 高天赐
Transcriptions
Standard Mandarin
- Hanyu Pinyin: Gāo Tiān Cì
- IPA: [káʊ tʰjɛ́n tsʰɹ̩̂]
Yue: Cantonese
- Jyutping: Gou1 Tin1 Ci3
- IPA: [kɔw˥ tʰin˥ tsʰi˧]

Portuguese name
- Portuguese: José Pereira Coutinho

José Maria Pereira Coutinho ComM (Chinese: 高天賜; born 22 July 1957) is a Macanese politician and jurist. He has been the Counselor of the Portuguese Communities since 2003, President of Macau Civil Servants Association since 1998, and President of pro-democracy party New Hope and Deputy of the Legislative Assembly of Macau since 2005.

== Background ==
José Maria Pereira Coutinho is son of former police chief Basílio Câncio Coutinho and housewife Maria Ida Lourdinha Julieta Pereira Coutinho who were both born in the former Portuguese colony of Goa, India, before emigrating to Macau. Born and raised in Macau, he studied and graduated in Law at the University of Macau. When he was a child, his dream was to follow in his father's footsteps and become a policeman one day, but his father convinced him to not be a policeman because there would be too many policemen at home.

His mother tongue is Portuguese, and as he was born in Macau, he learned to speak Cantonese in his teenage years and English while studying in high school and university. After being elected as a deputy of the Legislative Assembly of Macau in 2005, Coutinho spent more time on improving his Cantonese since it is preferred over Portuguese in the Legislative Assembly. Along with Leonel Alves (indirectly elected by the functional constituency of professional interests) he is one of only two deputies in the Legislative Assembly who can speak Portuguese fluently.

Coutinho is fluent in Portuguese, English and Cantonese, and is relatively proficient in Mandarin.

== Career ==
José Maria Pereira Coutinho has a Licentiate in Law from the University of Macau. He led the Department of Intellectual Property of the Economy Services of Macau Government, and worked as a General Secretary of Volunteered Arbitrary Center in Macau World Trade Center. He is also a member of several civic associations in Macau as honorary member and consultant.

Coutinho is the only Portuguese citizen elected (and by universal suffrage) to a seat in the Legislative Assembly of Macau. Under the Basic Law, foreign nationals may stand for election to directly elected seats, in contrast to Hong Kong, where they may only stand for indirectly elected seats in the Legislative Council.

The majority of seats in the assembly are either appointed by the chief executive or indirectly elected from functional constituencies. Macau has been a Special Administrative Region of the People's Republic of China since the transfer of sovereignty on 20 December 1999, marking an end to Portuguese administration after almost 500 years.

On 7 September 2015, Coutinho was re-elected as Councillor of the Portuguese Communities for the Macau, Hong Kong and China region with 2158 votes, 39 blank votes and 123 null votes, making Macau the region of the world where the Portuguese electorate was one of the most, if not the most active, among all regions; Brazil had 462 votes, while Germany had 245.

== Political and social activities ==
José Pereira Coutinho has participated in multiple political and social activities in Macau since early 2000 such as visiting poor families in the name of Macau Civil Servants Association and promoting the practice of sports specially among the youth (Coutinho himself is a former football player in the Macau 1st Division).

In October 2007, Coutinho highlighted how the Macau government was not telling the truth when it claimed that the gaming industry was helping Macau's wealth. According to Coutinho, the gaming Industry is only benefiting a few individuals leaving many in increasing difficulties as day goes by. Such difficulties did not exist or at least were not prominent previous to the boom of the Gaming Industry in Macau.

In October 2012, Coutinho continued to criticise Macau government strategy by stating that Macau has only one public hospital, but 36 casinos operating. The only public hospital in Macau is Hospital Conde S. Januario which was established in 1874.

Coutinho led a protest in the streets of Macau against a bill that was rejected by his peers in the Legislative Assembly in February 2014. This bill which was proposed by Coutinho would give animals basic rights since there is no regulation of what happens to the horses and greyhounds, which are also victims of the gaming industry.

Coutinho successfully led a massive protest in May 2014 in the streets of Macau against a proposal that his fellow deputies attempted to approve which basically consists of giving criminal immunity to government officials during and after their contracts end. The protest was so huge that the bill was consequently withdrawn even though the protest happened during the working hours of a working day.

In September 2015, José Pereira Coutinho became acquainted in the Dore Holdings case as he received 53 complaints from individuals that requested his help. The disappearance of $2 billion HKD from the junket's operator in one day may have opened a window to a deeper and darker side of Macau Gaming Industry since there are more junket operators and Dore Holdings is not the largest one.

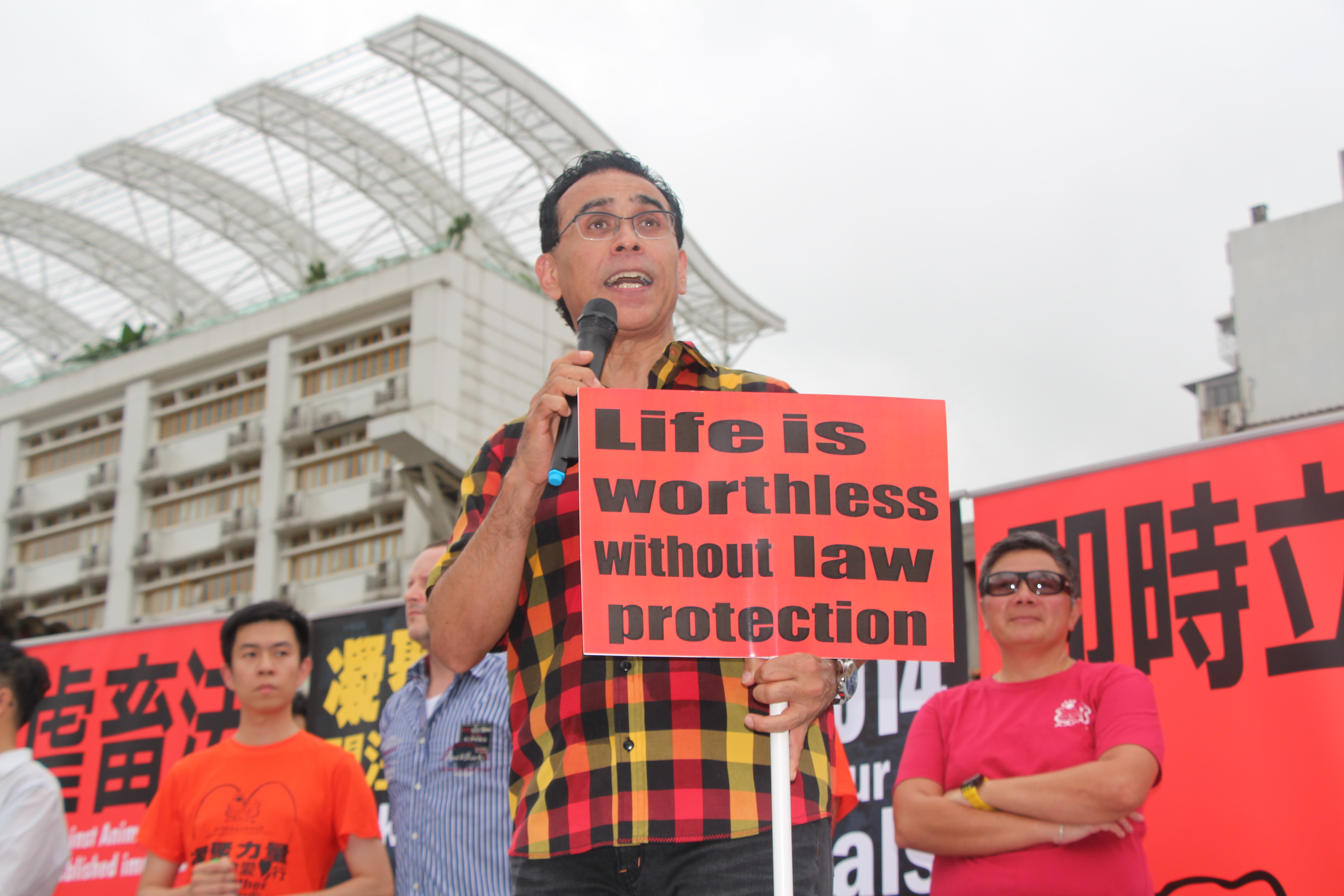
José Pereira Coutinho protesting in the streets of Macau in February 2014 against the rejection by the Legislative Assembly of a bill that gives animals basic rights

== "Nós, Cidadãos!" ==
On 27 August 2015, Coutinho confirmed that he would be standing for the Portuguese legislative elections in the "Outside Europe" constituency, heading the Nós, Cidadãos! (or We, the Citizens!) party. Had he been elected, Coutinho would have become the only politician in the world elected to parliaments in two different countries at the same time; the Legislative Assembly of the Macau Special Administrative Region of the People's Republic of China (where he had had a seat since 2005) and the Assembly of the Republic in Portugal.

As he was a popular figure in Macau and was known in the Portuguese communities around the world, Coutinho was seen as having a good chance of being elected as deputy for the "Outside Europe" constituency, according to Professor Mendo Henriques, leader of Nós, Cidadãos! political party. José Pereira Coutinho stated that he was "invited" by a strong political party in Portugal to withdraw his candidacy for the elections in Portugal, but did not.

On 25 September 2015, Professor Mendo Henriques announced that the political party was considering mounting a legal challenge to the elections for the "Outside Europe" constituency because of serious irregularities were found in the distribution of ballot papers among the Portuguese living overseas. As of 25 September 2015, only 4000 ballot papers were distributed to Portuguese voters in Macau although there were more than 15,000 registered in the Portuguese Consulate-General to date. Moreover, the destination address on the envelope for the ballot papers was missing the word "Portugal" meaning that the envelope may not have been sent to Portugal if the address were not corrected by the voter.

== Decorations ==
In May 2014, he was granted the degree of Commander of the Merit Order by the President of the Portuguese Republic Cavaco Silva.

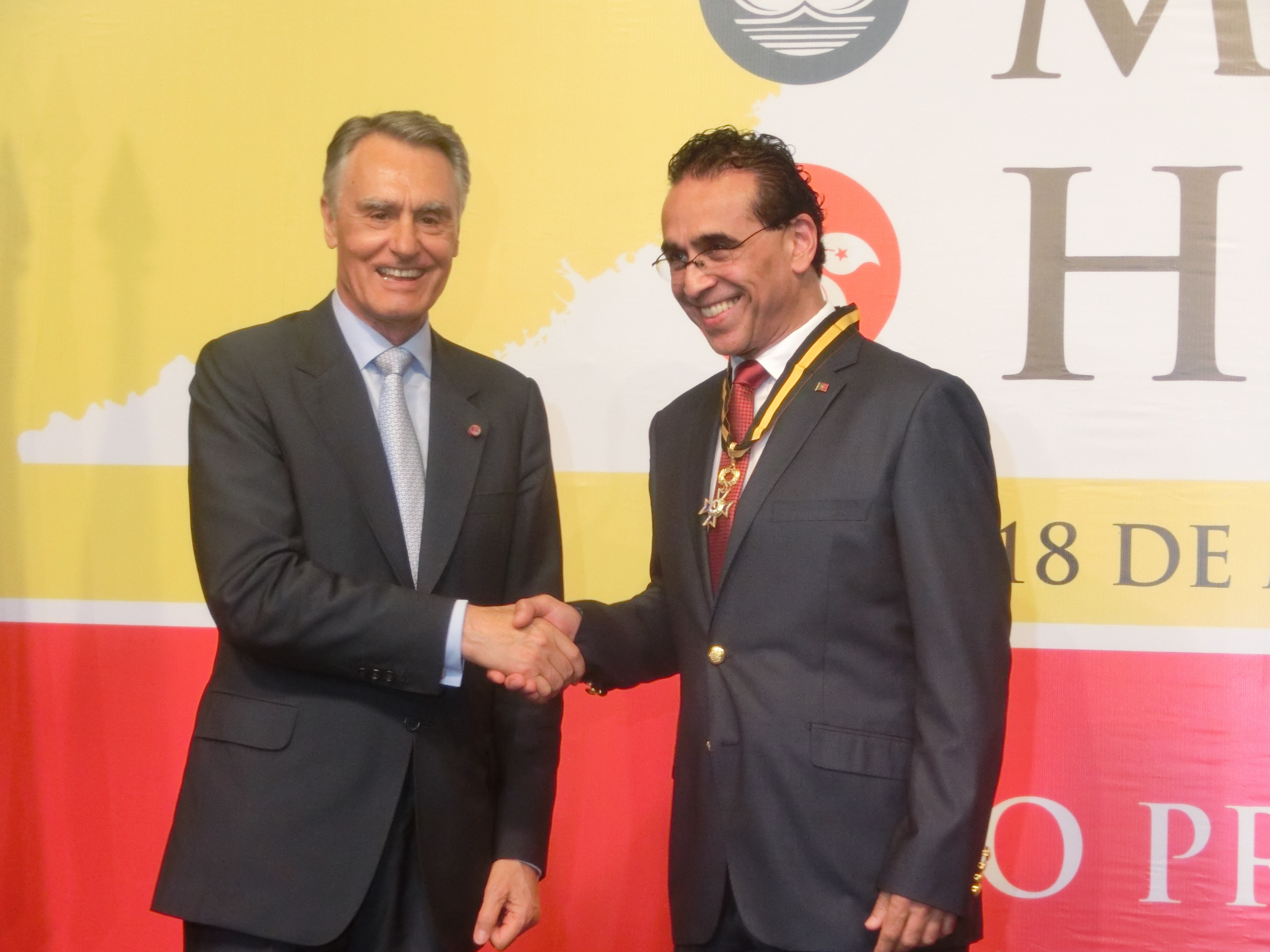
Jose Pereira Coutinho being decorated by the President of the Portuguese Republic, Cavaco Silva in May 2014

== Election results ==
=== Legislative Assembly of Macau ===
| Year | Candidate | Hare quota | Mandate | List Votes | List Pct |
|---|---|---|---|---|---|
| 2005 | José Pereira Coutinho (NE) | 9,974 | No.8/12 | 9,974 | 7.99% |
| 2009 | José Pereira Coutinho (NE) | 12,908 | No.6/12 | 12,908 | 9.10% |
| 2013 | José Pereira Coutinho (NE) | 6,559 | No.5/14 | 13,118 | 8.96% |
| 2017 | José Pereira Coutinho (NE) | 14,383 | No.4/14 | 14,383 | 8.33% |

=== Assembly of the Republic of Portugal ===
| Year | Candidate | Constituency | Votes | Percentage |
|---|---|---|---|---|
| 2015 | José Pereira Coutinho (NC) | Rest of the World | 2,631 | 17.9% |

== See also ==
- List of members of the Legislative Assembly of Macau
