= Macao Civic Power =

Political party in Macau

Macao Civic Power 澳門公民力量
- Portuguese name: Energia Cívica de Macau
- Chairwoman: Agnes Lam
- Founded: 28 September 2008
- Registered: 3 July 2006
- Regional affiliation: Centrist camp
- Legislative Assembly: 0 / 33

Website
- Facebook

Macao Civic Power (Chinese: 澳門公民力量; Portuguese: Energia Cívica de Macau), or in short Civic Power (Chinese: 公民力量; Portuguese: Energia Cívica), is a centrist political party in Macau.

== History ==
Macao Civic Power was founded on 28 September 2008, although official documents showed the organisation was registered early on 3 July 2006. They first ran in the 2009 Legislative Assembly election under the name of "Civic Watch" (Chinese: 公民監察; Portuguese: Observatório Cívico) but did not win any seats, and the same for 2013 election.

In 2017 election, chairwoman Agnes Lam was elected to the legislature. However, her 2021 re-election bid failed, ending the party representation in the Legislative Assembly.

== Elections performance ==
=== Legislative Assembly elections ===
Election	Number of popular votes	% of popular votes	GC seats	FC seats	CE seats	Total seats	+/−	Position
2009	5,329	3.76	0	–	–	0 / 33	Steady	11th
2013	5,524▲	3.57▼	0	–	–	0 / 33	Steady	10th▲
2017	9,590▲	5.56▲	1	–	–	1 / 33	1▲	10th
2021	3,729▼	2.82▼	0	–	–	0 / 33	1▼	8th▲

== Elected members ==
- Agnes Lam Iok-fong, 2017–2021
