= Mak Soi Kun =

Macanese politician

- 麥瑞權
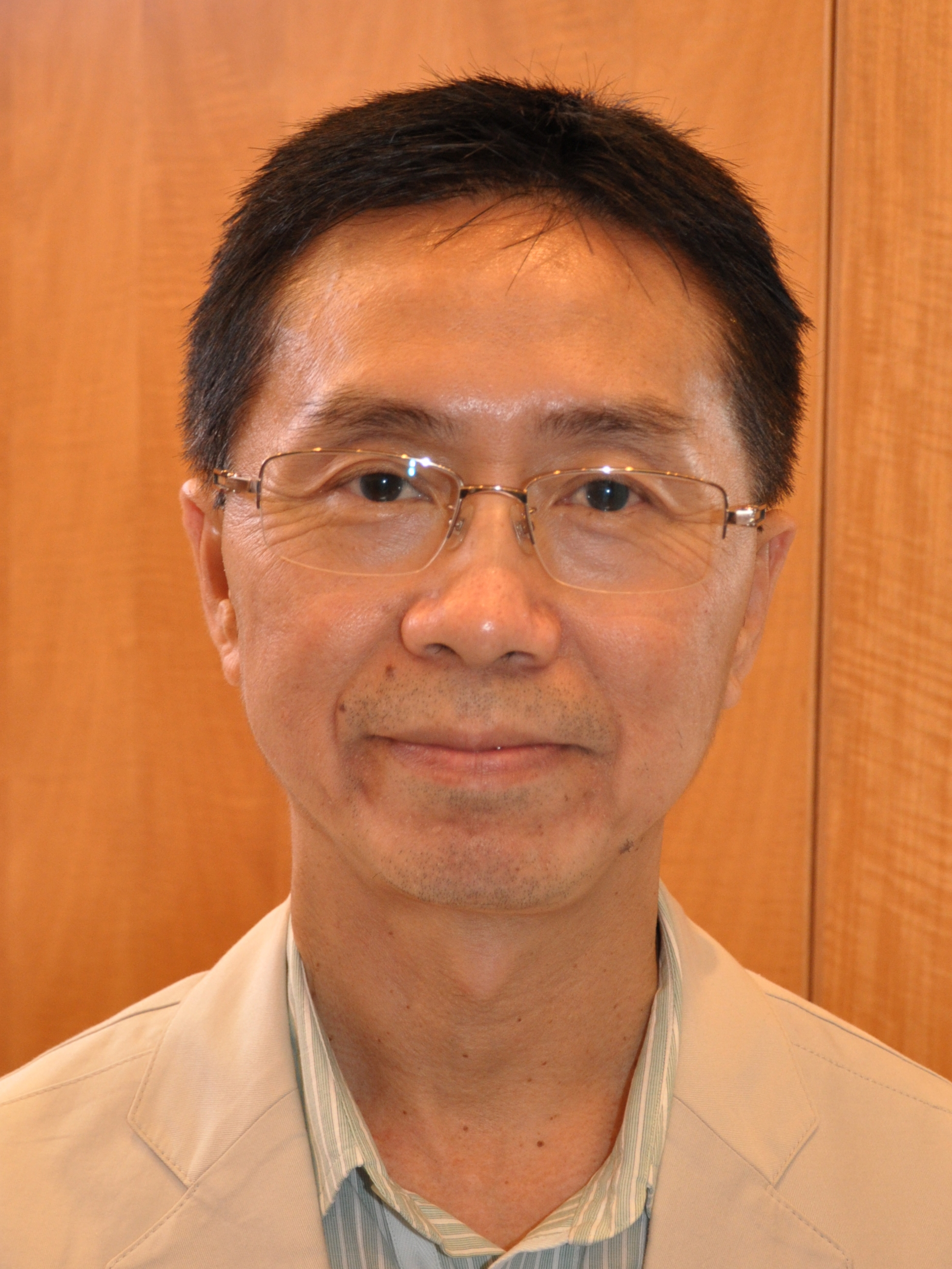

Member of the Legislative Assembly
- In office 20 September 2009 – 15 October 2021
- Preceded by: Leong Heng Teng
- Succeeded by: Lo Choi In
- Constituency: Macau (Directly elected)

Personal details
- Born: April 15, 1956 (age 70) Portuguese Macau
- Party: Macau-Guangdong Union

Mak Soi Kun (Chinese: 麥瑞權; born 15 April 1956 in Macau) is a member of the Legislative Assembly of Macau. With a construction business in the city, Mak and fellow legislator Zheng Anting, a casino VIP room manager, founded the Macau Jiangmen Communal Society and provide social benefits to new immigrants. He later entered politics with support from the working class after his mediation in the collapse of Sin Fong Garden.

== Election results ==
| Year | Candidate | Hare quota | Mandate | List Votes | List Pct |
|---|---|---|---|---|---|
| 2009 | Mak Soi Kun (UMG) | 10,348 | No.9/12 | 10,348 | 7.30% |
| 2013 | Mak Soi Kun (UMG) | 8,124 | No.2/14 | 16,248 | 11.09% |
| 2017 | Mak Soi Kun (UMG) | 8,603.5 | No.1/14 | 17,207 | 9.97% |

== See also ==
- List of members of the Legislative Assembly of Macau
