= New Hope (Macau) =

- Chinese name: 新希望
- Portuguese name: Nova Esperança
- Founded: 2005
- Ideology: Liberalism; Social liberalism
- Political position: Centre to centre-left
- National affiliation: Pro-democracy camp
- Colours: Lime
- Legislative Assembly: 3 / 33

Website
- www.atfpm.org.mo

New Hope (NE, Portuguese: Nova Esperança, Chinese: 新希望; Jyutping: san1 hei1mong6) is a political party in Macau. Its leader, José Pereira Coutinho, has served in the Legislative Assembly since 2005. In the most recent election on 14 September 2025, the party won 26.73% of the popular vote and 3 out of 14 directly elected seats. The party is the sole representative of the pro-democracy camp in the Macau Assembly.

== Elected AL members ==
- José Pereira Coutinho, 2005–present
- Leong Veng Chai, 2013–2017
- Che Sai Wang, 2021–present

== Legislative Assembly elections ==
Election	Number of popular votes	% of popular votes	Direct seats	FC seats	Appointed seats	Total seats	+/−	Position
2005	9,973	7.99	1	0	0	1 / 29	▲1	6th
2009	▲12,908	▲9.10	1	0	0	1 / 29	0	6th
2013	▲13,118	▼8.96	2	0	0	2 / 33	▲1	▲5th
2017	▲14,386	▼8.33	1	0	0	1 / 33	▼1	▲4th
2021	▲18,232	▲13.81	2	0	0	2 / 33	▲1	▲3rd
2025	▲43,361	▲26.73	3	0	0	3 / 33	▲1	▲1st
