= Au Kam San =

Macau politician (born 1957)

- 區錦新
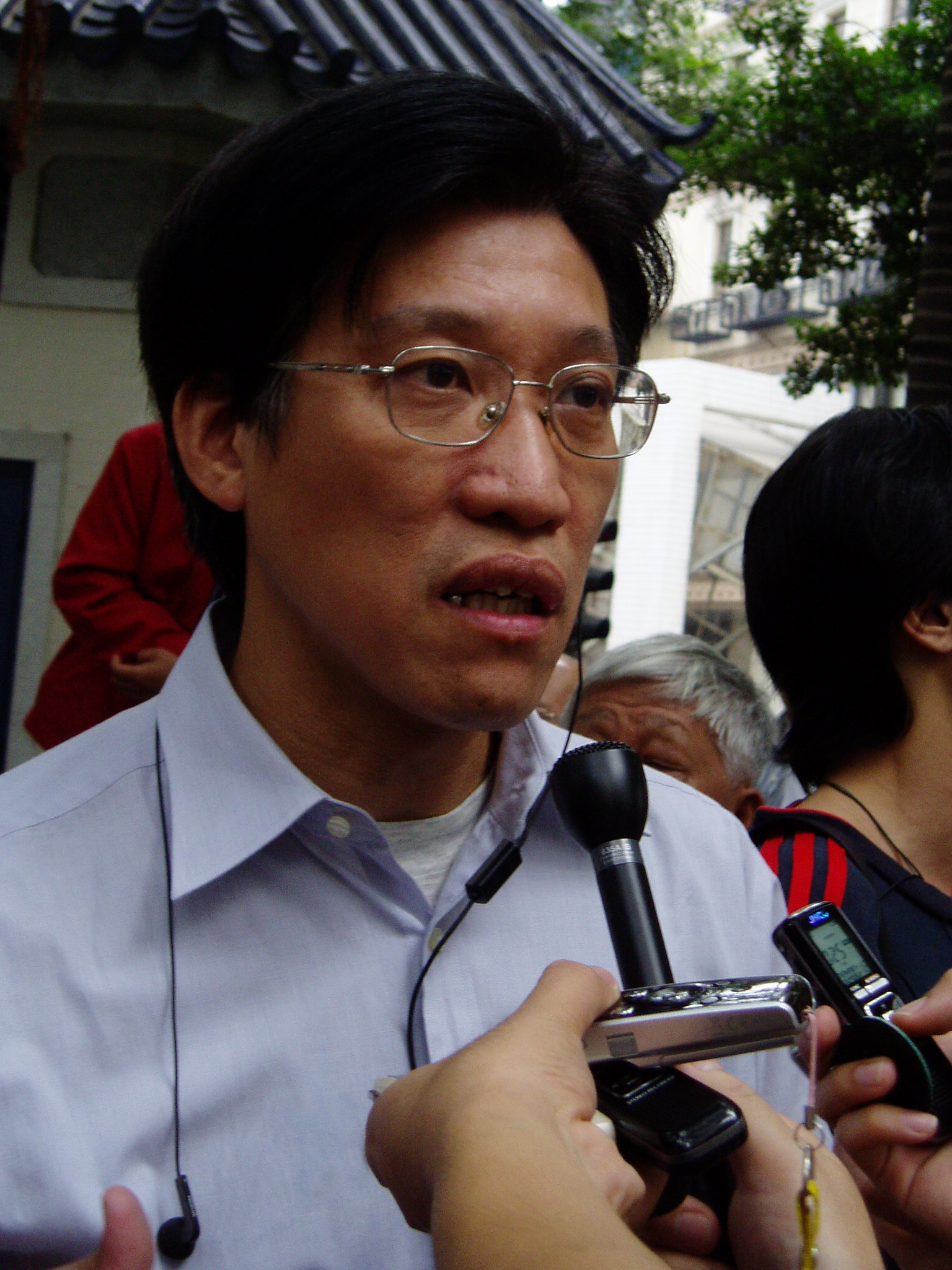
- Au in 2008

Member of the Legislative Assembly
- In office 23 September 2001 – 12 September 2021
- Preceded by: Kou Hoi In
- Constituency: Macau (Directly elected)

Personal details
- Born: 30 April 1957 (age 69) Portuguese Macau
- Citizenship: Chinese (Macau); Portuguese
- Party: New Macau Association (before 2016); New Democratic Macau Association (since 2016)

Au Kam San
- Traditional Chinese: 區錦新
- Simplified Chinese: 区锦新
Transcriptions
Standard Mandarin
- Hanyu Pinyin: Ōu Jǐnxīn
Yue: Cantonese
- Jyutping: au1 gam2 san1

Au Kam San (Chinese: 區錦新; born 30 April 1957 in Macau) is a former member of Legislative Assembly of Macau. He was a member of New Macau Association until 2016 and was one of the three pro-democracy lawmakers in Macau.

== Career ==
Au stepped down from the Legislative Assembly at the 2021 elections.

=== 2025 arrest ===
On 31 July 2025, Au was arrested by the Judiciary Police for alleged collusion with foreign forces to endanger national security, a crime under the revised Macau National Security Law. In 2026, Macau passed a law that allows judges to hold national security trials in secret behind closed doors. Au was the first person to be arrested under the law, charged with "subversion of state power" and building ties with foreign media outlets and groups allegedly to endanger national security. Prosecutors accused Au of assisting and collaborating with ‘external hostile organisations’ by collecting, preparing and disseminating information that was allegedly ‘manifestly filled with political claims of a subversive nature against the state’.

His trial was held on 16 September. He was convicted of "subversion against the political power of the state" in a closed-door trial on 6 November and was sentenced to 12 years and 6 months in prison. It was the first conviction under the Macau National Security Law, which was revised by lawmakers in 2023 to broaden its scope and to allow for closed-door trials.

The European Union issued a statement condemning Au's arrest.

== Election results ==
Year	Candidate	Hare quota	Mandate	List Votes	List Pct
2001	Au Kam San (AMN)	8,481	No.6/10	16,961	20.95%
2005	Au Kam San (AMN)	11,745	No.5/12	23,489	18.80%
2009	Au Kam San (AMN)	11,024	No.7/12	11,024	11.58%
2013	Au Kam San (AMN)	8,826	No.9/14	8,826	6.03%
2017	Au Kam San (ANMD)	11,380	No.6/14	11,380	6.59%

== See also ==
- List of members of the Legislative Assembly of Macau
