= Chan Meng Kam =

Member of the Legislative Assembly of Macau

Chan Meng Kam OMB
- 陳明金
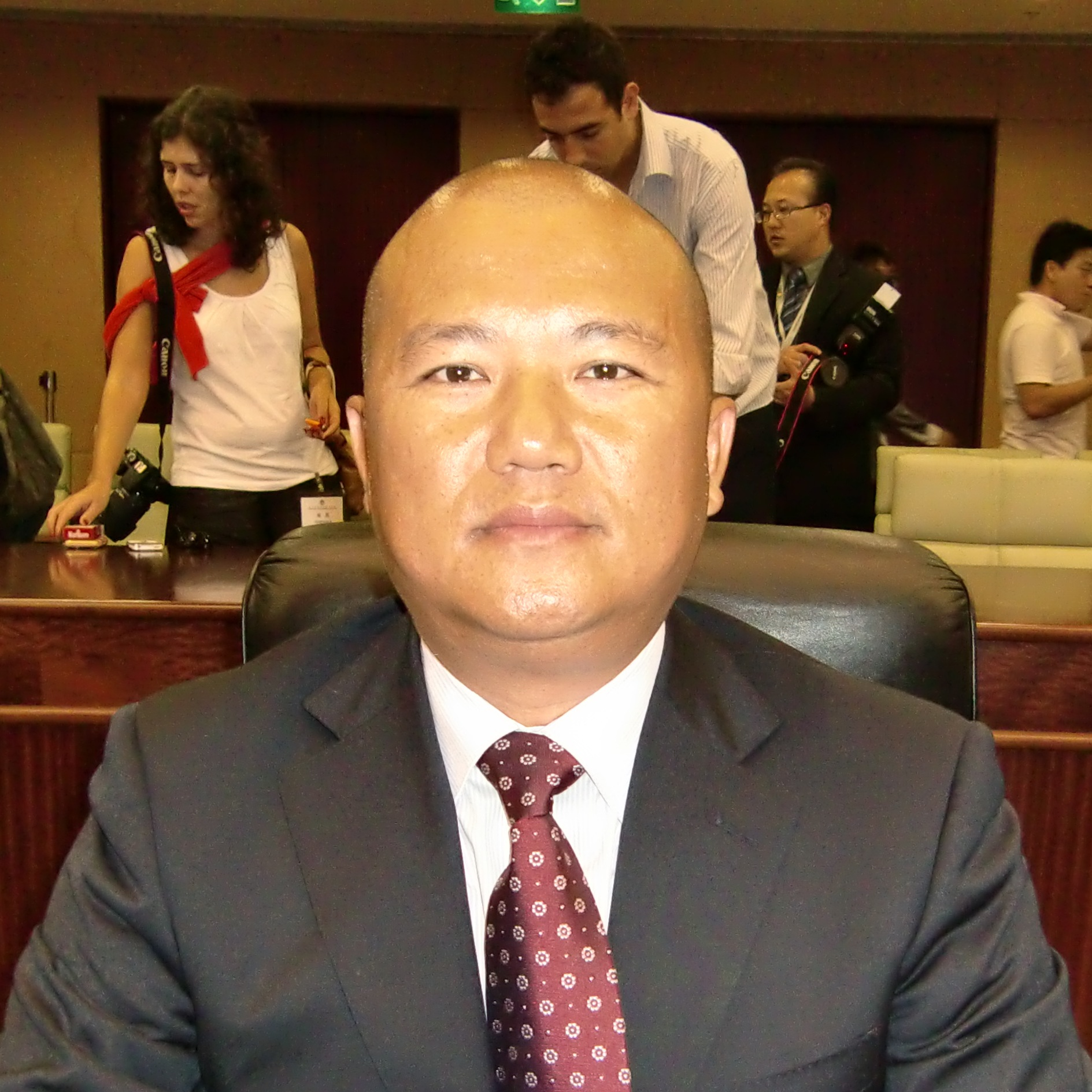

Member of the Legislative Assembly
- In office 25 September 2005 – September 2017
- Preceded by: Vitor Cheung
- Constituency: Macau (Directly elected)

Personal details
- Born: November 9, 1962 (age 63) Ludongcun, Dongshi, Jinjiang, Fujian
- Party: United Citizens Association of Macau

Chan Meng Kam
- Traditional Chinese: 陳明金
- Simplified Chinese: 陈明金
Transcriptions
Standard Mandarin
- Hanyu Pinyin: Chén Míngjīn
Yue: Cantonese
- Jyutping: can4 ming4 gam1

Chan Meng Kam (Chinese: 陳明金; born 9 November 1962 in Ludongcun, Dongshi, Jinjiang, Fujian, China) is a member of the Legislative Assembly of Macau. Chan Meng Kam is a member of the Chinese People's Political Consultative Conference, President of the Macau Paralympic Committee, Chairman of City University of Macau and Huaqiao University.

== Personal life ==
Chan arrived in Macau from mainland China when he was 17 years old. Despite the lack of education, he establishes himself as one of the predominant figure in Macau society. Chan made his fortunes during Macau's economic growth in the early 1990, first as a factory worker.

In 1990, Chan set up Golden Dragon Group Company Limited and later become the shareholder of San Miu Supermarket Limited. While he started his conglomerate with a rented casino VIP room from Stanley Ho, Chan's business empire later included supermarket, hotel and the trading of electrical appliances. Currently Chan is one of the richest man in Macau, owning hundreds of residential and commercial properties.

Chan transformed the Macao Fujian Fellow General Association from a provincial society to one of the major political parties with a vast network of community services for the working class. With a sizable following among the Fujian new immigrants, Chan entered politics and served as a directly elected legislator between 2005 and 2017.

== Trivia ==
Chan once gave away over one million hk dollars after scoring hole-in-one.

In August 2014, Chan's residence was robbed, a sum of 5000 Macau Pataca was stolen with nobody arrested over the incident.

== Election results ==
Year	Candidate	Hare quota	Mandate	List Votes	List Pct
2005	Chan Meng Kam (ACUM)	10,351	No.2/12	20,701	16.57%
2009	Chan Meng Kam (ACUM)	8,507	No.2/12	17,014	12.00%
2013	Chan Meng Kam (ACUM)	6,596	No.1/14	26,385	18.02%

== See also ==
- List of members of the Legislative Assembly of Macau
