= New Democratic Macau Association =

- Chinese name: 澳門社區發展新動力
- Portuguese name: Iniciativa de Desenvolvimento Comunitário de Macau
- Founded: 2016
- Dissolved: 2022
- Split from: New Macau Association
- Ideology: Liberalism; Liberal democracy
- Political position: Centre to centre-left
- National affiliation: Pro-democracy camp
- Colours: Orange

New Democratic Macau Association

Chinese name
- Traditional Chinese: 社區新動力
- Simplified Chinese: 社区新动力
Transcriptions
Standard Mandarin
- Hanyu Pinyin: Shèqū Xīn Dònglì
Yue: Cantonese
- Jyutping: se5 keoi1 san1 dung6 lik6

Portuguese name
- Portuguese: Iniciativa de Desenvolvimento Comunitário de Macau

The New Democratic Macau Association (Chinese: 澳門社區發展新動力; Portuguese: Iniciativa de Desenvolvimento Comunitário de Macau) was a pro-democracy group in Macau. Created from Au Kam San's split from the New Macau Association in 2016, the association ran in the 2017 legislative election and won 2 of the 14 popularly elected seats, with Au Kam San and António Ng re-elected. The group was disqualified to run in the 2021 election and was dissolved in the next year.

== Elected members ==
- Au Kam San, 2016–21
- António Ng Kuok Cheong, 2017–21

== Electoral performance ==
Only direct election results are shown.

Election	Number of votes	% of votes	Seats	+/−
2017	21,461	12.43	2 / 14	Steady
