= Alliance for Change (Macau) =

- Chinese name: 改革創新聯盟
- Portuguese name: Aliança Pr'a Mudança
- Founded: 2005
- Ideology: Conservatism; Economic liberalism
- Political position: Centre-right
- National affiliation: Pro-Beijing camp
- Legislative Assembly: 1 / 33

The Alliance for Change (Chinese: 改革創新聯盟; Portuguese: Aliança Pr'a Mudança) is a political party in the Chinese Special Administrative Region of Macau. In the 2009 Macanese legislative election, the party won 5.54 percent of the popular vote and 1 of the 12 popularly elected seats.

== Elected members ==
- Melinda Chan, 2009–present
