= Macau-Guangdong Union =

- Chinese name: 澳粵同盟
- Portuguese name: União de Macau-Guangdong
- Founded: 2005
- Ideology: Conservatism; Laissez-faire
- Political position: Centre-right to right-wing
- National affiliation: Pro-Beijing camp
- Legislative Assembly: 2 / 33

The Macau-Guangdong Union (Chinese: 澳粵同盟; Portuguese: União de Macau-Guangdong), UMG for short, is a political party in the Chinese Special Administrative Region of Macau. (Note: Technically there are no registered political parties in Macau, as there is no political party ordinance; groups are registered as societies or companies.) The party focuses on voters with origins or connections to Guangdong.

== Election results ==
In the 2009 parliamentary election, the party won 7.30 percent of the popular vote and 1 of the 12 popularly elected seats.

In the 2013 election, which was won by the Macau United Citizens Association (UCAM), the UMG was one of the parties gaining representation within the Legislative Assembly of Macau.

In 2021, the UMG gained 12.7% of the vote and two seats within the legislative assembly.

== Elected members ==
- Mak Soi Kun, 2009–2021
- Zheng Anting, 2013–2025
- Lo Choi In, 2021–2025
