= New Macau Development Union =

- Chinese name: 澳門發展新連盟
- Portuguese name: Nova União para Desenvolvimento de Macau
- Chairperson: Ambrose So
- Founded: 2005
- Ideology: Conservatism; Chinese nationalism Chinese socialism (de jure)
- Political position: Centre
- National affiliation: Pro-Beijing camp
- Colours: Yellow
- Legislative Assembly: 1 / 33

Website
- www.amdgo.com

The New Macau Development Union (Chinese: 澳門發展新連盟), formerly known as the Alliance for the Development of Macau (Portuguese: Aliança para Desenvolvimento de Macau), is a political party in the Chinese Special Administrative Region of Macau.

In the 2005 legislative election, the party won 9.3 percent of the popular vote and 1 of the 12 popularly elected seats. In the 2009 legislative election, the party won 9.94 percent of the popular vote and 1 of the 12 popularly elected seats.

== Elected members ==
- Angela Leong, 2005–present
