= Macau United Citizens Association =

- Chinese name: 民众建澳聯盟
- Portuguese name: Aliança de Povo de Instituição de Macau
- Founded: 2005
- Ideology: Conservatism; Economic liberalism Chinese nationalism
- Political position: Centre-right to right-wing
- National affiliation: Pro-Beijing camp
- Legislative Assembly: 3 / 33
- NPC (Macau deputies): 0 / 12
- CPPCC (Macau members): 1 / 29

Website
- www.api.org.mo

Macau United Citizens Association

Chinese name
- Traditional Chinese: 民众建澳聯盟
- Simplified Chinese: 民众建澳联盟
Transcriptions
Standard Mandarin
- Hanyu Pinyin: Mínzhòng Jiàn Ào Liánméng
Yue: Cantonese
- Jyutping: Man^{4}zung^{3} Gin^{3} Ou^{3} Lyun^{4}man^{4}

Portuguese name
- Portuguese: Aliança de Povo de Instituição de Macau

The Macau United Citizens Association (Note: Chinese: 民众建澳聯盟; Jyutping: Man^{4}zung^{3} Gin^{3} Ou^{3} Lyun^{4}man^{4}; Portuguese: Aliança de Povo de Instituição de Macau, abbr. API) is a political party in Macau.

In the 2005 legislative election, the party won 16.6 percent of the popular vote and 2 of the 12 popularly elected seats.

== Elected members ==
- Chan Meng Kam, 2005–present (co-owner of U Wa and shareholder in Pearl Oriental Enterprises Limited)
- Ung Choi Kun, 2005–2013
- Si Ka Lom, 2013–present
- Song Pek Kei, 2013–present

== See also ==
- Category:Macau United Citizens Association politicians
