= Associação para a Defesa dos Interesses de Macau =

Political party in Macau

Association for the Defense of Macau Interests Associação para a Defesa dos Interesses de Macau
- Abbreviation: ADIM
- Chairperson: Carlos d'Assumpção (until 1992)
- Founder: Carlos d’Assumpção
- Founded: 19 June 1974
- Newspaper: Jornal de Macau (until 1998)
- Ideology: Conservatism; Localism
- Political position: Centre-right

Association for the Defense of Macau Interests (Portuguese: Associação para a Defesa dos Interesses de Macau; Chinese: 澳門公民協會; lit. 'Macau Citizens Association'; ADIM) was a Portuguese conservative and localist political association based in Macau. Founded on 19 June 1974 by Delfino José Rodrigues Ribeiro and Carlos Augusto Corrêa Paes d’Assumpção, ADIM collaborated politically with Portuguese Social Democratic Center (CDS) in Portugal, as both shared similar ideology.

ADIM is a political association of Portuguese origin and of a conservative and localist nature founded in 1974 by a group of Macanese, among which were Delfino José Rodrigues Ribeiro and Carlos Augusto Corrêa Paes d’Assumpção, who naturally became the leader of this association. ADIM maintained a close political collaboration relationship with the CDS, whose ideology was similar to that of ADIM.

The death of ADIM co-founder and leader Carlos d'Assumpção in 1992, along with the emergence of new civic-political groups originated in the Chinese community, caused the significant decline of ADIM. After Macau's handover to China in December 1999, ADIM did not re-register as a "political association" as the rival CDM did. ADIM is also no longer active in Portugal as Macau ceased to be under Portuguese administration.

== Objectives ==
Unlike the liberal Democratic Centre of Macau (CDM), ADIM aimed to prevent Macau from being rapidly decolonized like the Portuguese colonies in Africa, and to defend the status quo of Macau as a Portuguese territory, instead of focusing on the democratization of Macau. With the formation of ADIM, local pressure also increased to transform the colonial structures that still existed in Macau.

== History ==
=== Formation and dominance ===
On 19 June 1974, Carlos Augusto Corrêa Paes d’Assumpção and other former members of the People's National Action, ruling party of Portugal until Carnation Revolution which saw the regime overthrown, formed the Association for the Defense of Macau Interests, mainly composed of Macau-born Portuguese (or Macanese). d’Assumpção became the chairman of the association.

In 1975 Portuguese Constituent Assembly election, ADIM ran in the Macau constituency of Constituent Assembly of Portugal and obtained 1,622 votes (0.03%), defeating CDM and electing Diamantino de Oliveira Ferreira as the deputy of Macau.

The co-founder and leader of ADIM, Carlos d'Assumpção, actively participated in the drafting of the new Organic Statute of Macau (EOM). In Macau's first free legislative elections in 1976, d'Assumpção led ADIM to victory after winning 4 out of 6 directly elected seats in the Legislative Assembly of Macau (AL), receiving 55% of votes. d’Assumpção was then elected President of the Legislative Assembly of Macau, a position he held until his death in 1992.

In the 1980 legislative election, ADIM won 1433 votes (59.3%) and 4 seats through direct election. ADIM also managed to elect a deputy (Delfino José Rodrigues Ribeiro) by indirect election in the sector of moral interests.

In 1984, d'Assumpção led an unusual conflict with Governor of Macau Vasco de Almeida e Costa, which resulted in the dissolution of the Legislative Assembly later that year. New election was then called, and the Governor implemented reforms days before the dissolution of AL, including tax incentives for voter registration. Therefore, non-Portuguese became the largest voter group in direct election for the first time. d'Assumpção, with the help of Beijing, led the Electoral Union (Portuguese: União Eleitoral; Chinese: 聯合提名委員會; lit. 'Joint Nomination Committee') made up of several important elements of the Chinese community, with Portuguese and Macanese elements from ADIM. The list won 16,003 votes (58.87%), with 4 deputies elected through direct election. In 1988, Electoral Union, led once again by d'Assumpção, got 6298 votes (31.41%) and 3 deputies elected by direct suffrage, and had lost the majority in directly elected seats.

=== Post-handover ===
Macau was handed over to China in December 1999. ADIM did not re-register as a "political association" as the rival CDM did. Carlos d'Assumpção, the co-founder and leader of ADIM, died in April 1992, effectively ending the history of Electoral Union. The death, along with the emergence of new civic-political groups originated in the Chinese community, caused the significant decline of ADIM with little influence and activities, and is not represented in the Legislative Assembly. ADIM is also no longer active in Portugal as Macau is no longer under Portuguese administration.

Its headquarters were located on Estrada D. João Paulino, in the Parish of S. Lourenço.

== Publications ==
In March 1975, ADIM launched the magazine Confluence, in which many Portuguese and Macanese participated, including the lawyer and writer Henrique de Senna Fernandes, who wrote mainly about movies. This party-operated publication served to counter the influence of the magazine Democracy in March, which had been publishing the ideas of the CDM since November 1974.

In October 1982, ADIM launched the Jornal de Macau, as opposed to the Tribuna de Macau, the publication appeared in the same month which was belonged to Jorge Neto Valente, one of the co-founders of the CDM. Nevertheless, Jornal de Macau and Tribuna de Macau ended up merging as Jornal Tribuna de Macau on 1 November 1998 as the change of political landscape and the approaching handover of Macau ended the rivalry between CDM and ADIM.

== Elected representatives ==
Below were the directly elected representatives of ADIM in AL from 1976 to 1992:

- Carlos Augusto Corrêa Paes d'Assumpção (1976–92)
- Diamantino de Oliveira Ferreira (1976–84)
- Susana Chou (1976–80)
- José da Conceição Noronha (1976–80)
- Joaquim Morais Alves (1980–92)
- Anabela Fátima Xavier Sales Ritchie (1980–84)
- Manuel de Mesquita Borges (1984–88)
- Lau Cheok-vá (1984–88)
- Leonel Alberto Alves (1984-92)
- Lao Kuoung-po (1988–92)

== Electoral performance ==
=== Constituent Assembly election ===
Only election results in Macau counted.

Election	Number of votes	% of votes	Seats	Total seats	+/−	Position
1975	1,622	61.16	1	1 / 1	Steady	1st

=== Legislative Assembly elections ===
Election	Number of popular votes	% of popular votes	DE seats	IE seats	AP seats	Total seats	+/−	Position
1976	1,497	54.96	4	0	0	4 / 17	4▲	1st
1980	1,433▲	59.34▲	4	1	0	5 / 17	1▲	1st
1984	16,003▲	58.87▼	4	0	0	4 / 17	1▼	1st
1988	6,298▼	31.41▼	3	0	0	3 / 17	1▼	2nd▼
1992	948▼	3.44▼	0	0	0	0 / 23	3▼	
