= 1980 Macanese legislative election =

- 28 September 1980
- Six of the 17 seats in the Legislative Assembly
- Turnout: 61.98% (▼16.06pp)
| Party | Leader | Vote % | Seats | +/– |
|---|---|---|---|---|
| ADIM | Carlos d'Assumpção | 59.34 | 4 | 0 |
| Democratic | Jorge Neto Valente | 22.77 | 1 | 0 |
| GIMA | Leonel Boralho | 17.89 | 1 | +1 |
This lists parties that won seats. See the complete results below.
| President before | President after |
|---|---|
| Carlos d'Assumpção; ADIM | Carlos d'Assumpção; ADIM |

Legislative elections were held in Portuguese Macau on 28 September 1980, returning 17 members of the Legislative Assembly of Macau, with 6 directly elected by electorates, 6 indirectly elected by special interest groups and 5 appointed by the Governor.

This was the second election for the new legislature, and only those with Portuguese nationality or the descendants of Portuguese people were eligible to vote. The election saw six directly elected seats were all won by the Macau-born Portuguese. Susana Chou, the only Chinese elected through the Macau constituency last time, did not stay in the Legislative Assembly. Association for the Defense of Macau Interest (ADIM), led by conservative Carlos d'Assumpção, and Democratic Centre of Macau, led by radicals, both kept their respective four and one seat, with ADIM remained the largest party. Governor Nuno Viriato Tavares de Melo Egídio then appointed five other members to the Legislative Assembly.

== Results ==
| Party | Votes | % | Seats | +/– |
|---|---|---|---|---|
| Association for the Defense of Macau Interests | 1,433 | 59.34 | 4 | 0 |
| Democratic Centre of Macau | 550 | 22.77 | 1 | 1 |
| Independent Group of Macau | 432 | 17.89 | 1 | +1 |
| Total | 2,415 | 100.00 | 6 | 0 |
| Valid votes | 2,415 | 92.88 | | |
| Invalid votes | 76 | 2.92 | | |
| Blank votes | 109 | 4.19 | | |
| Total votes | 2,600 | 100.00 | | |
| Registered voters/turnout | 4,195 | 61.98 | | |
Source: Imprensa Oficial de Macau

=== Members ===
Directly elected members
| Macau | Carlos d'Assumpção, Diamantino Ferreira, Joaquim Alves, Joaquim Valente, Leonel Boralho, Anabela Fátima Xavier Sales Ritchie |
Indirectly elected members
| Economic | Ma Man-kei, Peter Pan, Li Sai-veng |
| Moral | Delfino Ribeiro |
| Healthcare | Chui Tak-kei |
| Cultural | Joaquim Martins |
Appointed members
| Appointed | Ho Yin, Kwong Bing-yun, Ana Maria Fortuna de Siqueira Basto Perez, Eduardo Jorge Armas Tavares da Silva, Carlos Cavaleiro Gonçalves Sanches |
