= 1976 Macanese legislative election =

- 11 July 1976
- Six of the 17 seats in the Legislative Assembly
- Turnout: 78.04%
Party	Leader	Vote %	Seats
ADIM	Carlos d'Assumpção	54.96	4
GEDEC	Jorge Rangel	17.03	1
Democratic	José Patrício Guterres	16.82	1
This lists parties that won seats. See the complete results below.
President after
Carlos d'Assumpção; ADIM

Legislative elections were held in Portuguese Macau on 11 July 1976, returning 17 members of the Legislative Assembly of Macau, with 6 directly elected by electorates, 6 indirectly elected by special interest groups and 5 appointed by the Governor.

The Carnation Revolution in 1974 by the left-leaning military officers overthrew the Portuguese Government. The new government started the transition to democracy and decolonization in various colonies, including Macau which the sovereignty could be handed back to China. Democratic reforms were implemented in the city, such as the introduction of democratic elected seats in the Legislative Assembly through the newly enacted Organic Statute of Macau.

This was the first election after the legislature was revamped. Only those with Portuguese nationality or the descendants of Portuguese people were eligible to vote, and hence the Chinese cannot elect the members. Five out of six directly elected seats were won by Macau-born Portuguese, of which 4 were from Association for the Defense of Macau Interest led by conservative Carlos d'Assumpção, and 1 from Democratic Centre of Macau led by radicals supporting handover of Macau.

Governor José Eduardo Martinho Garcia Leandro then appointed five other members to the Legislative Assembly.

On 9 August 1976 the new Legislative Assembly convened its first meeting, with influential pro-Beijing businessman Ho Yin as the acting chair. A day later, Carlos d'Assumpção, the leader of the largest parliamentary faction, was elected the President of the Legislative Assembly, a position which he would hold until his death in 1992.

== Results ==
Party	Votes	%	Seats
Association for the Defense of Macau Interests	1,497	54.96	4
Study Group for Community Development of Macau	464	17.03	1
Democratic Centre of Macau	458	16.81	1
Independent Group of Macau	305	11.20	0
Total	2,724	100.00	6
Valid votes	2,724	95.71	
Invalid votes	43	1.51	
Blank votes	79	2.78	
Total votes	2,846	100.00	
Registered voters/turnout	3,647	78.04	
Source: Imprensa Oficial de Macau

=== Members ===
Directly elected members
Macau	Carlos d'Assumpção, Diamantino Ferreira, Susana Chou, Jorge Alberto Hagedorn Rangel, José Patrício Guterres, José Noronha
Indirectly elected members
Economic	Ma Man-kei, Peter Pan, Li Sai-veng
Moral	Lydia Ribeiro
Healthcare	Chui Tak-kei
Cultural	Francisco Rodrigues
Appointed members
Appointed	Ho Yin, Kwong Bing Yun, Mário Figueira Isaac, Anabela Fátima Xavier Sales Ritchie, Ana Maria Fortuna de Siqueira Basto Perez
