= 1984 Macanese legislative election =

- 15 August 1984
- 6 of the 17 seats in the Legislative Assembly
- Turnout: 56.30% (▼5.68pp)
Party	Leader	Vote %	Seats	+/–
Electoral Union	Carlos d'Assumpção	58.87	4	0
ECP	Alberto Ferreira	14.57	1	New
Friendship	Alexandre Ho	12.93	1	New
This lists parties that won seats. See the complete results below.
President before	President after
Carlos d'Assumpção; UE	Carlos d'Assumpção; UE

Legislative elections were held in Portuguese Macau on 15 August 1984. There were 17 members of the Legislative Assembly of Macau up for election: six directly elected by electorates, six indirectly elected by special interest groups and five appointed by the Governor of Macau.

Following the political deadlock between the conservatives led by Carlos d'Assumpção and Almeida e Costa, Governor of Macau, the Legislative Assembly was dissolved on 27 January 1984 by Ramalho Eanes, President of Portugal, under the request by the Governor. The unprecedented move, reacted strongly within the Macanese society, triggered the election and allowed new voter registration, which the Governor hoped to expand the electorate base.

The voting began at 8 am local time and ended at 8 pm. Queues were seen especially in morning and at night. With nearly 30,000 voting, the turnout was at around 60% (media report in Hong Kong gave near figures at 60% or 55%). A majority of the 6 directly elected seats, elected through the D'Hondt method, were won by the Electoral Union, which consisted of pro-Beijing Chinese and Macau-born Portuguese with some from the Association for the Defense of Macau Interests (ADIM), and therefore retained their influence in the city. Five of the indirectly elected seats were uncontested, while the remaining seat for Welfare, Culture, Education constituency was competed between three candidates.

The Governor of Macau, Vasco de Almeida e Costa, then appointed five other members to the Legislative Assembly, ensuring the control of Portuguese in the parliament.

== Results ==
Party	Votes	%	Seats	+/–
Electoral Union	16,003	58.87	4	0
Stability, Convergence and Progress	3,960	14.57	1	New
Friendship Association	3,514	12.93	1	New
Serving the People of Macau	2,003	7.37	0	New
Alvorada	1,704	6.27	0	New
Total	27,184	100.00	6	0
Valid votes	27,184	93.84		
Invalid votes	1,220	4.21		
Blank votes	566	1.95		
Total votes	28,970	100.00		
Registered voters/turnout	51,454	56.30		
Source: Imprensa Oficial de Macau

=== Members ===
Directly elected members
Macau	Carlos d'Assumpção, Manuel Borges, Lau Cheok-vá, Leonel Alberto Alves, Alberto Ferreira, Alexandre Ho
Indirectly elected members
Economic	Ma Man-kei, Chui Tak-kei, Pedro Macias, Victor Ng, Susana Chou
Moral, Cultural, Healthcare	Roque Choi
Appointed members
Appointed	Pedro Ló da Silva, Rui António Craveiro Afonso, Carlos Cavaleiro Gonçalves Sanches, Hoi Sai-iun, Luís Filipe Ferreira Simões
