= Centro Democrático de Macau =

Democratic Centre of Macau Centro Democrático de Macau
- Abbreviation: CDM
- Founder: Joaquim Jorge Perestrelo Neto Valente; José Celestino da Silva Maneiras; Damião Rodrigues; Vivaldo Rosa
- Founded: 30 April 1974
- Newspaper: Tribuna de Macau (until 1998)
- Ideology: Progressivism
- Political position: Centre-left
- National affiliation: Socialist Party (Portugal) (until 1999)

Democratic Centre of Macau (Portuguese: Centro Democrático de Macau; Chinese: 澳門民主協會; CDM) is a centre-left progressive Portuguese political association based in Macau, then a Portuguese colony. Founded on 30 April 1974, five days after the Carnation Revolution, it remains the only registered political association in Macau, different from the better-known civic associations.

== Objectives ==
Aiming to contribute to the exercise of civil and political rights and the political participation in Macau, the CDM pushes for the democratic progress in Macau, and advocates free, active, enlightened, and conscious participation of citizens in public with democratic experience.

The CDM also urges to defend the principles set out in the Universal Declaration of Human Rights, and to sign International Covenant on Civil and Political Rights and International Covenant on Economic, Social and Cultural Rights.

== History ==
On 30 April 1974, leftists and Armed Forces Movement met in Fat Siu Lau restaurant in Macau for the first time, including lawyer Joaquim Jorge Perestrelo Neto Valente, architect José Celestino da Silva Maneiras, Damião Rodrigues and Vivaldo Rosa. It became the first meeting of the Democratic Centre of Macau (CDM), which hoped to celebrate the new political era followed by the Carnation Revolution.

CDM mainly pushed for the democratization of Macau. They also called for removing José Manuel de Sousa e Faro Nobre de Carvalho as Governor of Macau, in opposition to the conservative and localist factions led by the Association for the Defense of Macau Interests (ADIM) which supported him to stay.

CDM ran in the 1975 Portuguese Constituent Assembly election in the Macau constituency of Constituent Assembly of Portugal, but was defeated by ADIM after receiving 1,030 votes only. CDM once had a political protocol with the Socialist Party in Portugal, with some describing CDM as a party branch of the Socialist Party in Macau, but it remains active in Macau only for now.

Macau had the first legislative election in 1976, which the CDM managed to obtain 458 votes (16.8%) in direct election. José Patrício Guterres, representing CDM, was elected to the Legislative Assembly of Macau. In the 1980 legislative election, the CDM won 550 votes (22.7%) and represented by one deputy, Joaquim Jorge Perestrelo Neto Valente by direct election. However, under enormous socio-political overhaul in Macau, new civic-political groups originated in the Chinese community emerged, and the CDM had therefore declined significantly with little influence and activities. CDM is currently not represented in the Legislative Assembly.

== Publications ==
In November 1974, CDM launched the magazine Democracy in March. In October 1982, newspaper Tribuna de Macau was founded and owned by Neto Valente, a lawyer co-founded CDM, in opposition to the Jornal de Macau, which was associated with ADIM. Nevertheless, Jornal de Macau and Tribuna de Macau ended up merging as Jornal Tribuna de Macau on 1 November 1998 as the change of political landscape and the approaching handover of Macau ended the rivalry between CDM and ADIM.

== Electoral performance ==
=== Constituent Assembly election ===
Only election results in Macau counted.

Election	Number of votes	% of votes	Seats	Total seats	+/−	Position
1975	1,030	38.84	0	0 / 1	Steady	2nd

=== Legislative Assembly elections ===
Election	Number of popular votes	% of popular votes	DE seats	IE seats	AP seats	Total seats	+/−	Position
1976	458	16.82	1	0	0	1 / 17	1▲	2nd
1980	550▲	22.77▲	1	0	0	1 / 17	Steady	2nd
