= 1973 Macanese legislative election =

- March 1973

13 in the Legislative Assembly 7 seats needed for a majority
- Turnout: 67%

Elections to a Legislative Assembly were held in Macau in March 1973.

== Background ==
On 2 May 1972 the Portuguese National Assembly passed the Organic Law for the Overseas Territories, which provided for greater autonomy for overseas territories. The Assembly was composed by the Governor of Macau (who was the president ex officio) and 14 members, one of which would be appointed by the Governor to represent the interests of the Chinese community, five of which would be directly elected by geographical constituency and eight of which would be indirectly elected by functional constituencies.

Candidates to be elected were required to be Portuguese citizens who had lived in Macau for more than one year or had previously resided there for a period exceeding ten years and be able to read and write Portuguese (except for those representing economic interests, who were only required to be able to read and speak Portuguese). Voters were required to be literate. As the Portuguese constitution banned political parties at the time, the majority of candidates were put forward by the ruling People's National Action movement, although some civic associations were allowed to nominate candidates.

== Results ==
Out of a total population of 248,316, only 2,620 people registered to vote. A total of 1,765 people voted.

The directly elected members were João Albino Ribeiro Cabral, Adolfo Adroaldo Jorge, Humberto Fernando Rodrigues, Francisco Xavier da Cruz Hagatong and José Celestino da Silva Maneiras. The indirectly elected members were Carlos Augusto Corrêa Paes d’Assumpção, João Horácio Maria da Conceição and Henrique Rodrigues de Senna Fernandes (by administrative bodies and collective persons of public utility); Vong Hon Heng and Chui Tak Kei (by associations of economic interests); Fernanda da Mota Salvador and Graciette Agostinho Nogueira Batalha (by organizations representing moral and cultural interests); and Frederico Nolasco da Silva (by private institutes and associations). Ho Yin was the appointed member to represent the interests of the Chinese community.
