= 1988 Macanese legislative election =

- 9 October 1988
- Six of the 17 seats in the Legislative Assembly
- Turnout: 29.66% (▼26.64pp)
Party	Leader	Vote %	Seats	+/–
Friendship	Alexandre Ho	41.12	3	+2
Electoral Union	Carlos d'Assumpção	31.41	3	−1
This lists parties that won seats. See the complete results below.
President before	President after
Carlos d'Assumpção; UE	Carlos d'Assumpção; UE

Legislative elections were held in Portuguese Macau on 9 October 1988, returning 17 members of the Legislative Assembly of Macau, with six directly elected by electorates, six indirectly elected by special interest groups and five appointed by the Governor.

The Electoral Union consisted of pro-Beijing Chinese and Macau-born Portuguese, which retained their influence in the city. The voter turnout dropped to a record low of 29.92%. 6 directly elected seats, elected through D'Hondt method, were divided between the conservatives and democrats.

Governor Carlos Melancia later appointed Ana Perez, Anabela Ritchie, Neto Valente, Philipe Xavier, Rui Afonso to the Legislative Assembly, ensuring the control of Portuguese in the parliament. The 4th Legislative Assembly convened the first meeting on 10 November 1988. Carlos D'Assumpção was re-elected as the President of the Assembly while Edmund Ho became the vice.

== Results ==
Party	Votes	%	Seats	+/–
Friendship Association	8,246	44.62	3	+2
Electoral Union	6,298	34.08	3	–1
Civil Law Protection	1,599	8.65	0	New
Union of Friends of Macau	1,188	6.43	0	New
Macanese Alliance	1,150	6.22	0	New
Total	18,481	100.00	6	0
Valid votes	18,481	92.18		
Invalid votes	1,150	5.74		
Blank votes	418	2.08		
Total votes	20,049	100.00		
Registered voters/turnout	67,604	29.66		
Source: Imprensa Oficial de Macau

=== Members ===
Directly elected members
Macau	Alexandre Ho, Carlos d'Assumpção, Leong Kam-chun, Lao Kuoung-po, Wong Cheong-nam, Leonel Alberto Alves
Indirectly elected members
Economic	Ma Man-kei, Lau Cheok-vá, Pedro Macias, Victor Ng, Susana Chou
Moral, Cultural, Healthcare	Edmund Ho
Appointed members
Appointed	Ana Perez, Anabela Ritchie, Neto Valente, Philipe Xavier, Rui Afonso
