= 1975 Portuguese Constituent Assembly election =

- 25 April 1975

All 250 seats in the Constituent Assembly of Portugal 126 seats needed for a majority
- Registered: 6,231,372
- Turnout: 5,711,829 (91.7%)
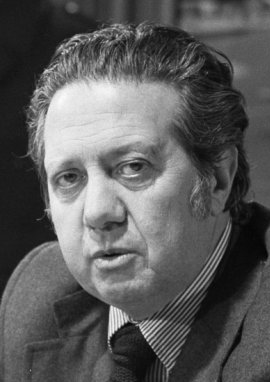

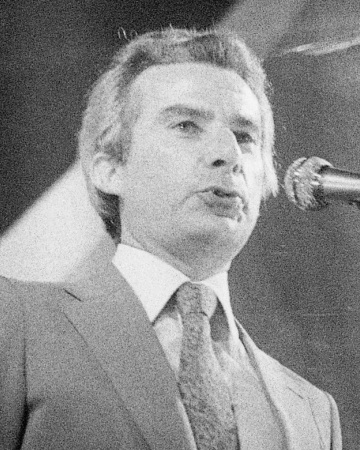

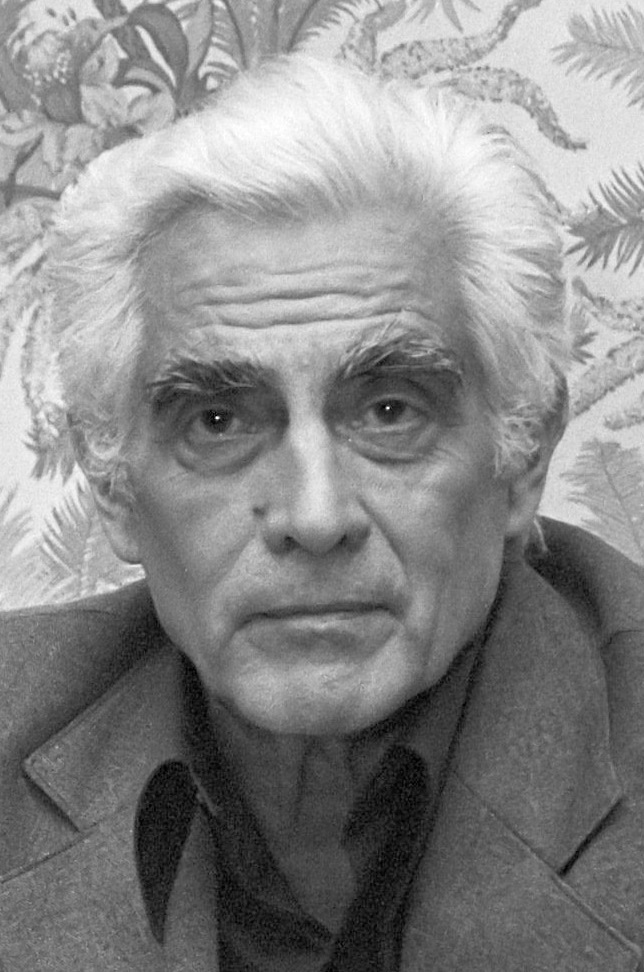

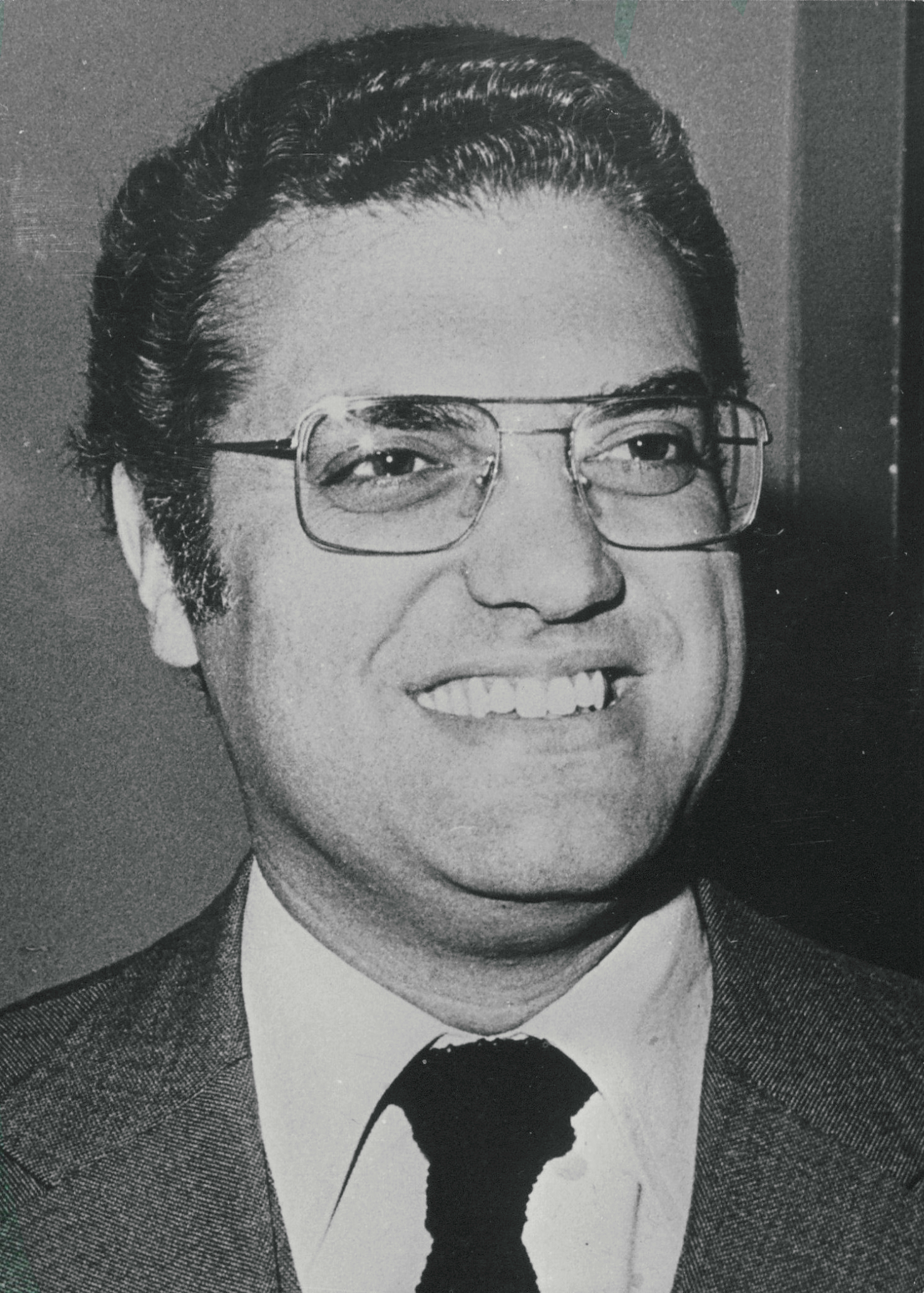

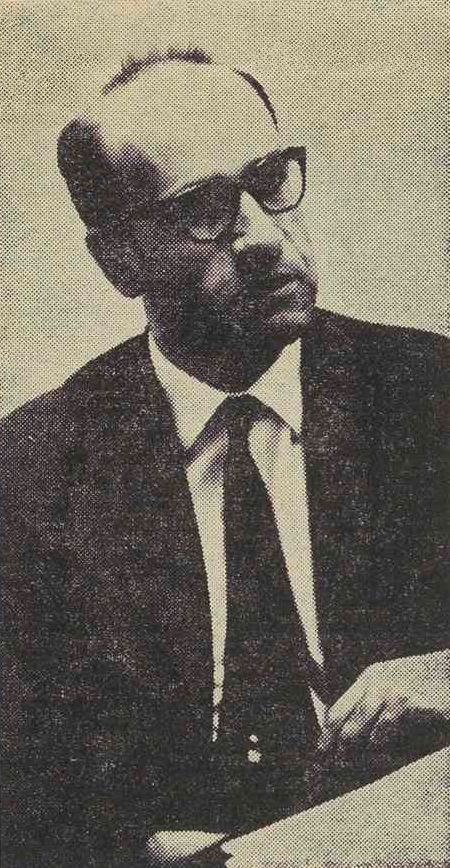

	First party	Second party	Third party
Leader	Mário Soares	Francisco Sá Carneiro	Álvaro Cunhal
Party	PS	PPD	PCP
Leader since	19 April 1973	6 May 1974	31 March 1961
Leader's seat	Lisbon	Porto	Lisbon
Seats won	116	81	30
Popular vote	2,162,972	1,507,282	711,935
Percentage	37.9%	26.4%	12.5%
	Fourth party	Fifth party	Sixth party
Leader	Diogo Freitas do Amaral	Francisco Pereira de Moura	João Pulido Valente
Party	CDS	MDP/CDE	UDP
Leader since	19 July 1974	September 1969	9 March 1975
Leader's seat	Lisbon	Lisbon	Lisbon
Seats won	16	5	1
Popular vote	434,879	236,318	44,877
Percentage	7.6%	4.1%	0.8%

A Constituent Assembly election was carried out in Portugal on 25 April 1975, exactly one year after the Carnation Revolution. The election elected all 250 members of the Portuguese Constituent Assembly.

It was the first free election held in Portugal since 1925, but also the first under universal suffrage in Portuguese history. Turnout was a record 91.66 percent, which remains (as of 2025) the highest ever in any Portuguese democratic elections (general, regional, local or European).

The main aim of the vote was the election of a Constituent Assembly, in order to write a new constitution to replace the Estado Novo regime's authoritarian Constitution of 1933, and so, this freely-elected parliament had a single-year mandate, with no government being based on parliamentary support; the country continued to be governed by a military-civilian provisional administration during the deliberations of the Constituent Assembly.

With very few opinion polls during the campaign, the real trend of the electorate was unknown, but incumbent Prime Minister Vasco Gonçalves was confident in a victory of the most leftwing forces in Portugal, forecasting that the Portuguese Democratic Movement (MDP/CDE) would win the election, followed by the Communists (PCP) and then the Socialist Party (PS). In the end, this forecast was totally wrong.

The election was won by the Socialist Party with almost 38 percent of the votes and 116 seats. The Social Democratic Party (then known as the Democratic People's Party, PPD) was the second-most voted party, 26.4 percent and 81 seats, defending a project that it would soon abandon, social democratic centrism, the Portuguese "Social-Democracy", and becoming the major right-wing party in the country a few years after. The size of the results of the PPD were a big surprise, taking into account that they won double the votes of the Communists.

The new parliament had a large majority of parties defending socialist or "democratic socialist" ideas and the Constitution, approved one year after, reflected such influence. The Portuguese Communist Party achieved a surprisingly low total, just 12 percent, considering the overwhelming support in the south of the country and the radical turn to the left of the revolutionary process after the failed fascist coup, one month before.

With the PPD's shift away from the left and towards the right coming after this election, the only right-of-centre party elected was the Democratic and Social Center (CDS), which received 7.6 percent of the vote and 16 seats. The other big surprise were the very weak results of MDP/CDE, which polled just at 4 percent and elected 5 members to the Assembly.

The results map showed a strong North-South division, with the more right-wing forces, PPD and CDS, dominating the North and Center regions, mainly in rural areas, and the PCP dominating the South, especially the Alentejo region. The PS dominated the big urban areas around Lisbon, Porto, Coimbra and Setúbal.

== Background ==
The previous parliamentary election was held on October 28, 1973, still under the authoritarian rule of the Estado Novo (New State), founded by António de Oliveira Salazar, who died in 1970. The People's National Action (ANP), the single party of the then President of the Council of Ministers, Marcelo Caetano, had won the all 150 deputies of the National Assembly in the 1973 election, with a participation rate of 66.5% of registered. The election was boycotted by Opposition forces due to complaints about democratic legitimacy and oppression.

=== 1974 revolution ===
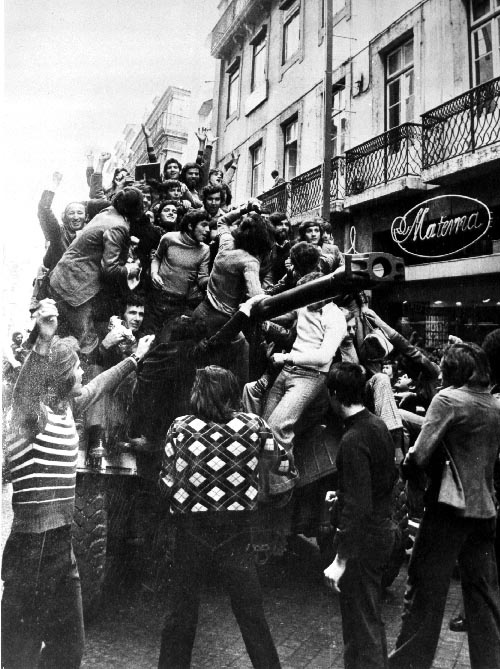
Crowd celebrating the revolution in an armoured car.

On April 25, 1974, the Carnation Revolution, led by the captains of the Armed Forces Movement (MFA), ended the authoritarian regime established in 1932 by António de Oliveira Salazar. After the revolutionary forces proclaimed victory, the National Salvation Junta, presided by General António de Spínola, took over the position of Head of State and Government.

With political parties once again legal, the Socialist Party (PS) leader, Mário Soares, and the Portuguese Communist Party (PCP) Secretary General, Álvaro Cunhal, returned to Portugal less than a week later. In addition, the members of the "liberal wing" of the ANP, favorable to a democratization of the "Estado Novo" before its fall, founded the Democratic People's Party (PPD) which claimed to be social democratic.

At the end of three weeks, Spínola took the oath as President of the Republic, and nominated Adelino da Palma Carlos as Prime Minister to the head of the 1st provisional government in which civil and military members plus independent, socialists, social democrats and communists also took part. However, this government was severely limited by the powers of the MFA, as Palma Carlos attempted to expand his powers as prime minister, but clashed with the MFA and his government fell.

On July 18, Vasco Gonçalves, a military man seen as very close to the Communist Party, replaced Palma Carlos as head of the government. After this, the first party that didn't claim to be from the left or the center-left appeared, the Democratic and Social Center (CDS), which claimed to be an advocate of Christian democracy.

Barely two and a half months later, Spínola resigned as President of the Republic, after his "silent majority" proposed protest was boycotted by the MFA, and was replaced by General Francisco da Costa Gomes, his deputy in the National Salvation Junta. On March 19, 1975, President Costa Gomes officially called an election to elect members to write a new Constitution, just 8 days after Spínola's failed counter-coup on 11 March.

== Electoral system ==
The electoral system adopted, set by the electoral law approved on November 15, 1974, establishes the election of members of parliament by proportional representation according to the D'Hondt method, known to benefit the parties that come first.

The law fixes the number of one deputy per 25,000 inhabitants and one more per fraction of 12,500. Deputies were elected in twenty-three constituencies, namely the eighteen metropolitan districts, Horta, Ponta Delgada, Angra do Heroísmo, Funchal, Mozambique, Macau, and the rest of the world.

In application of these provisions, 250 seats were to be filled.

For these elections, the MPs distributed by districts were the following:

District	Number of MPs	Map
Lisbon	55	
Porto	36	
Setúbal	16	
Braga	15	
Aveiro	14	
Santarém	13	
Coimbra	12	
Leiria	11	
Viseu	10	
Faro	9	
Castelo Branco	7	
Beja, Funchal, Guarda, Viana do Castelo and Vila Real	6	
Évora	5	
Bragança and Portalegre	4	
Ponta Delgada	3	
Angra do Heroísmo	2	
Emigration, Horta, Macau and Mozambique	1	

== Parties ==
The table below lists the major parties that contested the elections:

Name		Ideology	Political position	Leader
PS	Socialist Party; Partido Socialista	Social democracy	Centre-left	Mário Soares
PPD	Democratic People's Party; Partido Popular Democrático	Liberalism	Centre	Francisco Sá Carneiro
PCP	Portuguese Communist Party; Partido Comunista Português	Communism	Far-left	Álvaro Cunhal
CDS	Democratic and Social Center; Centro Democrático e Social	Christian democracy	Centre-right	Diogo Freitas do Amaral
MDP/CDE	Portuguese Democratic Movement; Movimento Democrático Português	Left-wing nationalism Democratic socialism	Left-wing	Francisco Pereira de Moura
UDP	Popular Democratic Union; União Democrática Popular	Marxism; Socialism	Left-wing	João Pulido Valente
ADIM	Association for the Defense of Macau Interests; Associação para a Defesa dos Interesses de Macau	Conservatism; Macau interests	Right-wing	Diamantino Ferreira

== Campaign period ==
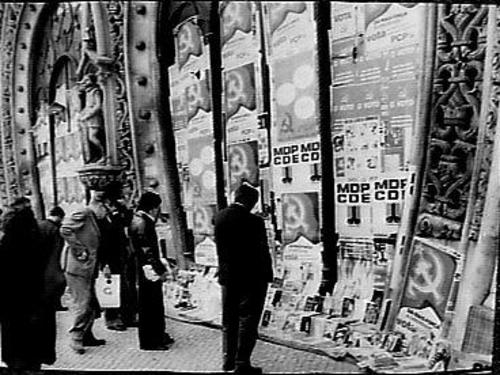
Election posters on the facade of Rossio Station, Lisbon, on the eve of the elections.

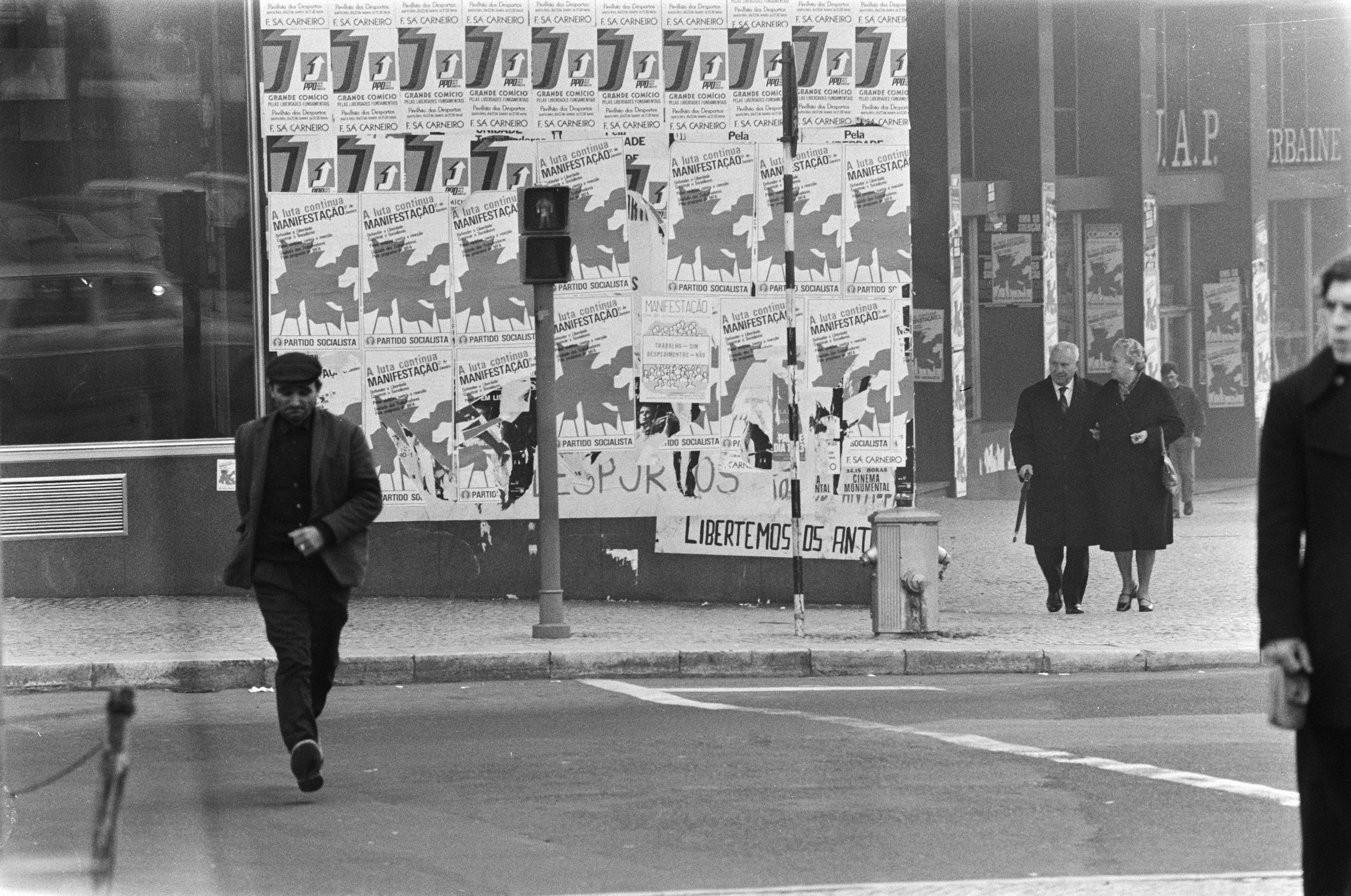
Election posters in Lisbon, 1975.

=== Issues ===
The election campaign took place during a period of great political tension, with growing division and failed coup attempts. Prior to the election, the communist backed Armed Forces Movement (MFA) forced political parties to sign a pact that would normalize military rule and limit any future civilian rule. Parties promised to follow the signed pact, but many within the MFA were "suspicious" of the election, with opinions divided between those who supported the idea of not holding the vote and others who advocated for a mass blank vote. All the main party leaders campaigned throughout the country, with the exception of the leader of the Democratic People's Party (PPD), Francisco Sá Carneiro, who was absent from the country during the campaign due to treatment for an illness that afflicted him, only returning home to cast his ballot.

=== Party slogans ===
Party or alliance	Original slogan	English translation	Refs
PS	« A verdadeira escolha »	"The real choice"	
PPD	« Tu decides votando »	"You decide by voting"	
PCP	« Dá mais força à Liberdade »	"Empower Freedom"	
CDS	« O voto certo »	"The right vote"	
MDP	« O voto do povo »	"The people's vote"	
UDP	« Em frente com a UDP »	"Moving forward with UDP"	

=== Candidates' debates ===
On the election night broadcast on RTP1, a debate took place, moderated by Joaquim Letria, on the electoral results revealed so far, with the participation of the leaders of the four main parties at the time: Mário Soares (Socialist Party), Joaquim Magalhães Mota replacing Francisco Sá Carneiro (Social Democratic Party), Álvaro Cunhal (Portuguese Communist Party), and Francisco Pereira de Moura (MDP/CDE). The questions to the guests were asked by a panel of commentators made up of journalists Manuel Beça Múrias, Dinis Abreu, José Júdice, Castro Mendes and José Carlos Vasconcelos.

1975 Portuguese Constituent Assembly election
Date	Organisers	Moderator(s)	P Present S Absent invitee N Non-invitee				
Date	Organisers	Moderator(s)	PS	PPD	PCP	MDP/CDE	Refs
26 Apr	RTP1	Joaquim Letria	Soares	Mota (Note: Independent Joaquim Magalhães Mota replaced Francisco Sá Carneiro.)	Cunhal	Moura	

== Opinion polling ==
Polling firm/Link	Date Released	PS	PPD	PCP	CDS	MDP	O	Lead
1975 Constituent election	25 Apr 1975	37.9; 116	26.4; 81	12.5; 30	7.6; 12	4.1; 5	11.5; 2	11.5
IPOPE	Mar 1975	47	21	17	2	4	9	26
Vida Mundial	27 Feb 1975	49	27	14	—N/a	6	4	22
CUF	Dec 1974	35.1	27.0	10.8	—N/a	2.7	24.4	8.1

== Results ==
=== National summary ===
Party	Votes	%	Seats
Socialist Party	2,162,972	37.87	116
Democratic People's Party	1,507,282	26.39	81
Portuguese Communist Party	711,935	12.46	30
Democratic and Social Centre	434,879	7.61	16
Portuguese Democratic Movement	236,318	4.14	5
People's Socialist Front	66,307	1.16	0
Movement of Socialist Left	58,248	1.02	0
Popular Democratic Union	44,877	0.79	1
Communist Electoral Front (Marxist–Leninist)	33,185	0.58	0
People's Monarchist Party	32,526	0.57	0
Popular Unity Party	13,138	0.23	0
Internationalist Communist League	10,835	0.19	0
Association for the Defense of Macau Interests	1,622	0.03	1
Democratic Centre of Macau	1,030	0.02	0
Total	5,315,154	100.00	250
Valid votes	5,315,154	93.06	
Invalid/blank votes	396,675	6.94	
Total votes	5,711,829	100.00	
Registered voters/turnout	6,231,372	91.66	
Source: Comissão Nacional de Eleições

Vote share
PS	37.87%
PPD	26.39%
PCP	12.46%
CDS	7.61%
MDP/CDE	4.14%
FSP	1.16%
MES	1.02%
UDP	0.79%
FEC(m-l)	0.58%
PPM	0.57%
ADIM	0.03%
Others	0.43%
Blank/Invalid	6.95%

Parliamentary seats
PS	46.40%
PPD	32.40%
PCP	12.00%
CDS	6.40%
MDP/CDE	2.00%
UDP	0.40%
ADIM	0.40%

=== Distribution by constituency ===
Results of the 1975 election of the Portuguese Constituent Assembly by constituency
Constituency	%	S	%	S	%	S	%	S	%	S	%	S	%	S	Total S
Constituency	PS		PPD		PCP		CDS		MDP/CDE		UDP		ADIM		Total S
Angra do Heroísmo	23.0	-	62.8	2	2.4	-	6.1	-	1.1	-					2
Aveiro	31.8	5	42.9	7	3.2	-	11.1	2	3.9	-					14
Beja	35.6	3	5.3	-	39.0	3	2.2	-	5.5	-	1.4	-			6
Braga	27.4	5	37.7	7	3.7	-	18.0	3	2.9	-	-	-			15
Bragança	24.7	1	43.0	3	2.7	-	13.5	-	3.7	-	-	-			4
Castelo Branco	41.5	5	24.3	2	5.6	-	6.4	-	3.9	-	0.8	-			7
Coimbra	43.2	7	27.2	4	5.7	1	4.6	-	4.4	-					12
Évora	37.9	3	6.9	-	37.1	2	2.8	-	7.8	-	0.9	-			5
Faro	45.4	6	13.9	1	12.3	1	3.4	-	9.5	1	1.1	-			9
Funchal	19.6	1	61.9	5	1.7	-	10.0	-	1.3	-					6
Guarda	28.2	2	33.3	3	2.9	-	19.5	1	3.6	-					6
Horta	23.0	-	67.6	1	2.4	-			3.1	-					1
Leiria	33.2	5	35.6	5	6.4	-	6.8	1	3.4	-	1.1	-			11
Lisbon	46.0	29	15.0	9	18.9	11	4.8	3	4.1	2	1.7	1			55
Macau													56.4	1	1
Mozambique	41.1	1													1
Ponta Delgada	30.4	1	54.8	2	1.5	-	3.1	-	2.7	-					3
Portalegre	52.4	3	9.9	-	17.5	1	4.0	-	4.5	-	1.2	-			4
Porto	42.6	18	29.4	12	6.7	2	8.9	3	2.6	1	0.6	-			36
Santarém	42.9	8	18.8	3	15.1	2	4.3	-	4.1	-	1.0	-			13
Setúbal	38.2	7	5.7	1	37.8	7	1.6	-	6.0	1	1.3	-			16
Viana do Castelo	24.5	2	36.0	3	3.8	-	14.5	1	7.1	-					6
Vila Real	27.1	2	45.8	4	2.9	-	7.2	-	2.3	-					6
Viseu	21.5	2	43.9	6	2.3	-	17.2	2	4.0	-					10
Emigration	34.4	-	45.6	1			4.6	-	11.0	-					1
Total	37.9	116	26.4	81	12.5	30	7.6	16	4.1	5	0.8	1	0.0	1	250
Source: Comissão Nacional de Eleições

=== Maps ===
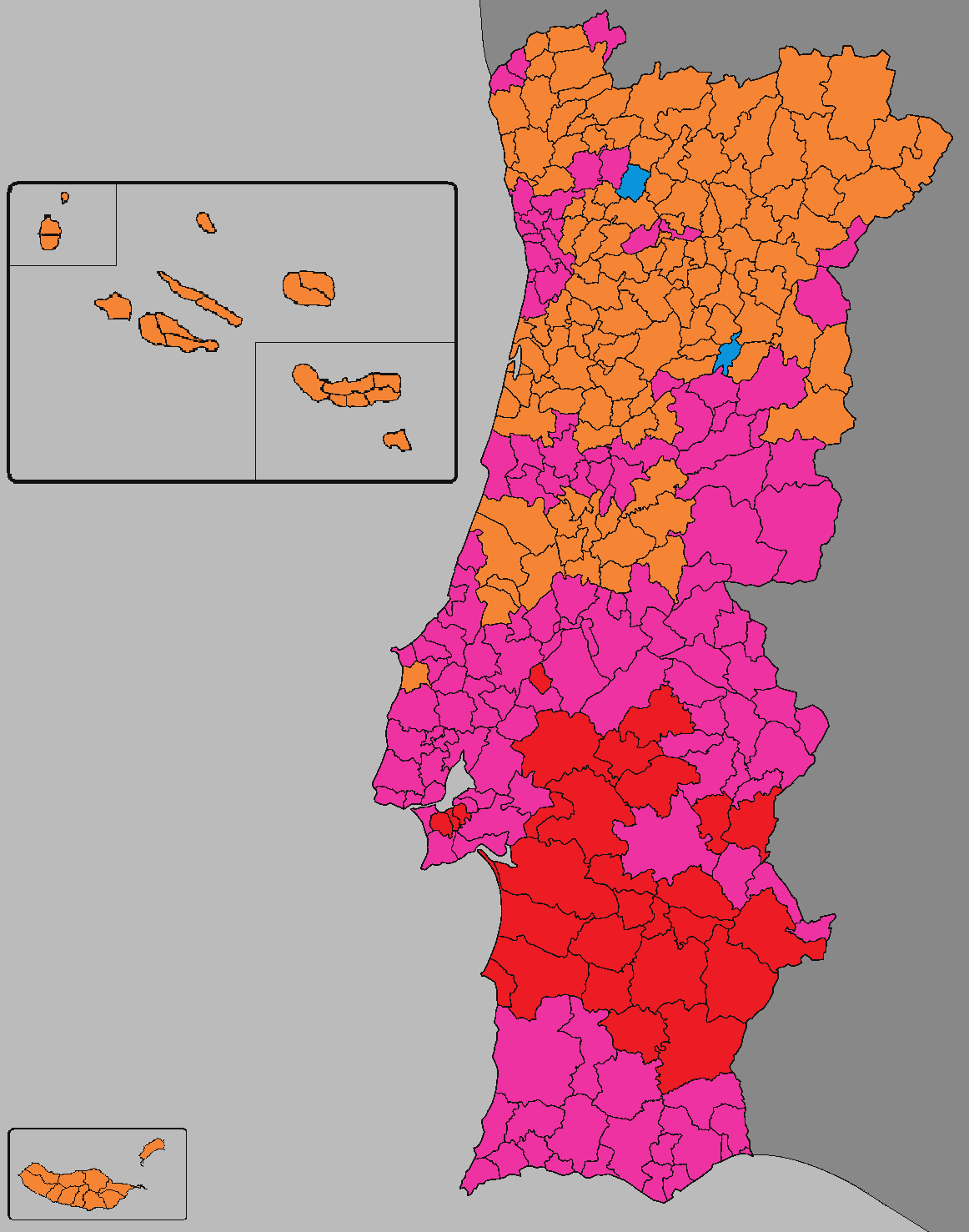
Most voted political force by municipality.

== See also ==
- Politics of Portugal
- List of political parties in Portugal
- Elections in Portugal
