= Golden Lotus Medal of Honour =

Golden Lotus Medal of Honour Medalha de Honra Lótus de Ouro 金蓮花榮譽勳章
- Awarded for: Providing exceptional services to the Macao SAR, in its image and good name, both in the Region and abroad, or for providing services, in any domain, of great relevance to the development of the Macao SAR.
- Presented by: Macau
- Post-nominals: GLM
- Established: 2001
- First award: 2001

Precedence
- Next (higher): Grand Lotus Medal of Honour
- Next (lower): Silver Lotus Medal of Honour

The Golden Lotus Medal of Honour (Portuguese: Medalha de Honra Lótus de Ouro; Chinese: 金蓮花榮譽勳章; pinyin: Jīn liánhuā róngyù xūnzhāng) is the second-highest award under the MSAR honors and awards system which recognizes lifelong and highly significant contributions to the well-being of Macau.

== List of recipients ==
Year	WInners
2001	Stanley Ho
2001	Chui Tak Kei
2001	Lao Kuong Po
2002	Lei Seng Chon
2002	Domingos Lam
2002	Ho Sai Lun
2003	Ng Fok
2004	Lau Cheok Va
2005	Tong Chi Kin
2007	Peter Peng
2009	Leong Heng Teng
2009	Ho Iat-seng
2009	Yeung Tsun Man Eric
2010	António Ferreira
2012	Commercial Association of Macau
2013	Ho Lai Cheng
2014	Vítor Ng
2015	Florinda Chan
2015	Francis Tam
2015	Cheong Kuoc Vá
2015	José Proença Branco
2016	Cheong U
2016	Lei Pui Lam
2017	Choi Lai Hang
2018	Chan Meng Kam
2019	Liu Chak Wan
2019	Ma Iao Lai
2020	Macau Chinese Education Association
2020	Lau Si-io
2020	Lionel Leong
2020	Ma Yaoquan
2021	Kiang Wu Hospital
2021	Chui Sai Cheong
2022	Tung Sin Tong
