= Portuguese Democratic Movement =

Defunct political party in Portugal

Portuguese Democratic Movement Movimento Democrático Português
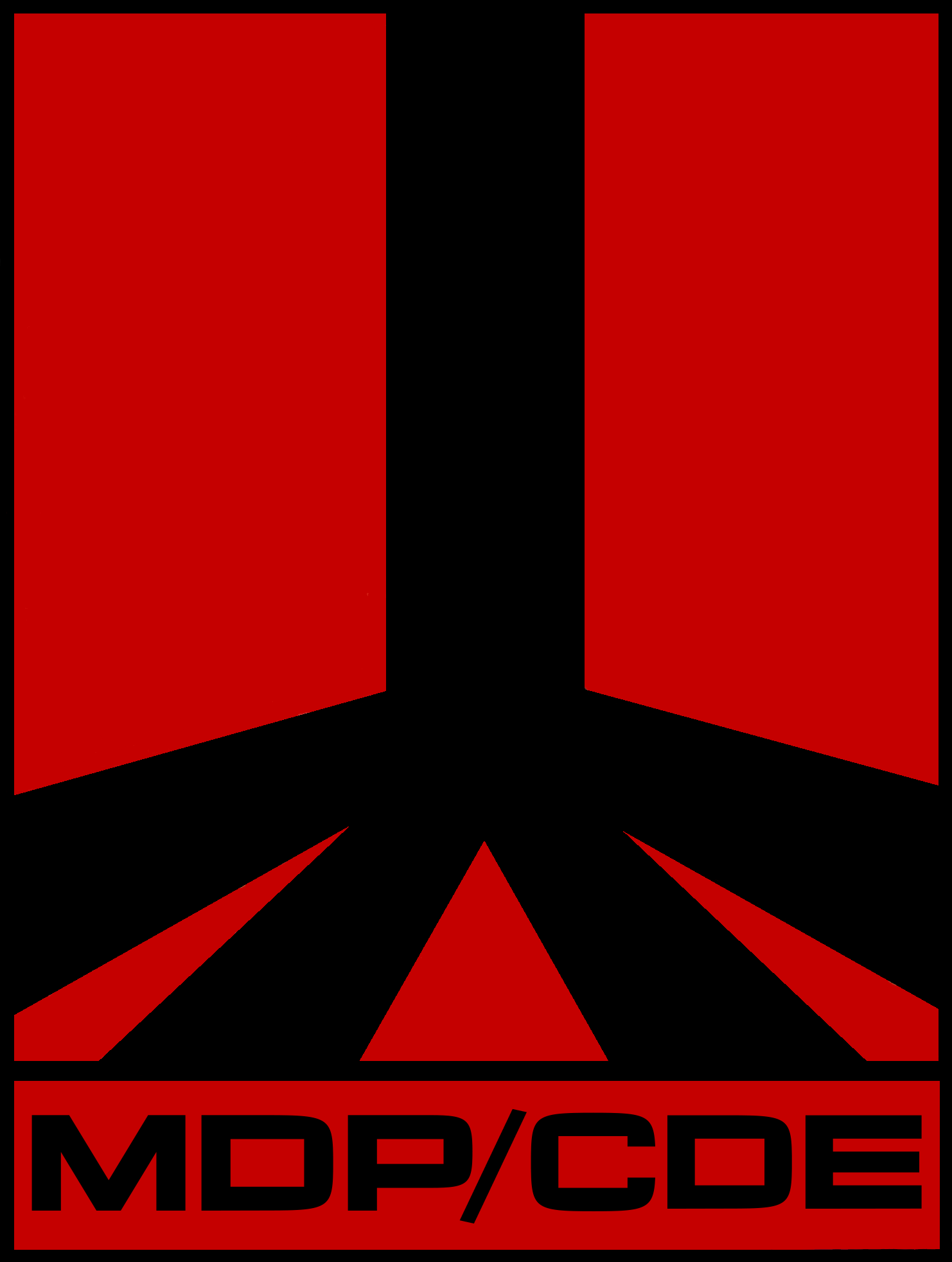
- President: Francisco Pereira de Moura
- Founded: 1969
- Dissolved: 28 March 1994; 32 years ago
- Succeeded by: Politics XXI
- Headquarters: Lisbon
- Think tank: Democratic Intervention
- Ideology: Left-wing nationalism Democratic socialism
- Political position: Left-wing
- National affiliation: United People Alliance (1979–1987)
- Colours: Red and black

The Portuguese Democratic Movement/Democratic Electoral Commission (Portuguese: Movimento Democrático Português / Comissão Democrática Eleitoral, MDP/CDE or just MDP) was one of the most important organizations of the democratic opposition to the Estado Novo. It was founded in 1969 as an electoral coalition meant to run in the non-democratic and widely manipulated parliamentary election.

== History ==
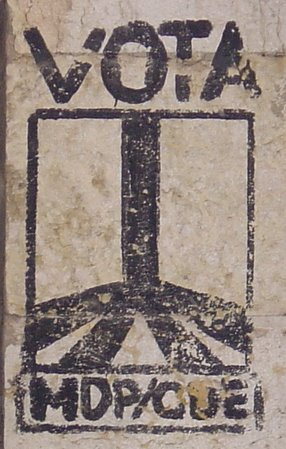
A MDP/CDE graffito

In 1973 the MDP took part in the Democratic Congress of Aveiro, the largest meeting of democratic militants during the dictatorship. After the Carnation Revolution in 1974, it was made part of every provisional government, with exception of the 6th and in 1979 it ran in coalition with the Portuguese Communist Party in the FEPU and later in APU, achieving important electoral results.

In 1986, disagreements with the PCP arose, the coalition was dissolved and the MDP was later disbanded. A fraction formed the political association Democratic Intervention (Portuguese: Intervenção Democrática) and another group formed a new party, the Politics XXI (Portuguese: Política XXI) that now is part of the Left Bloc.

== Electoral history ==
=== Assembly of the Republic ===
Election	Leader	Votes	%	Seats	+/-	Government
1969	Francisco Pereira de Moura	114,745	10.3 (#2)	0 / 130	New	No seats
1973	Withrew before the ballot					
1975	Francisco Pereira de Moura	236,318	4.1 (#5)	5 / 250	▲5	Constituent assembly
1976	Did not contest					
1979	José Manuel Tengarrinha	United People Alliance		3 / 250	▲3	Opposition
1980	José Manuel Tengarrinha	United People Alliance		2 / 250	▼1	Opposition
1983	José Manuel Tengarrinha	United People Alliance		3 / 250	▲1	Opposition
1985	José Manuel Tengarrinha	United People Alliance		3 / 250	0	Opposition
1987	José Manuel Tengarrinha	32,067	0.6 (#8)	0 / 250	▼3	No seats

=== European Parliament ===
Election	Leader	Votes	%	Seats	+/–	EP Group
1987		27,678	0.5 (#10)	0 / 24		–
1989	António Victorino de Almeida	56,900	1.4 (#6)	0 / 24	0	–
