= Weightlifting at the 1975 National Games of China =

Weightlifting was part of the 1975 National Games of China held in Beijing. Only men competed in eight bodyweight categories which mostly mirrored the international standard at the time. The Chinese Weightlifting Association became a member federation of the IWF earlier in 1974.

The competition program at the National Games mirrors that of the Olympic Games as only medals for the total achieved are awarded, but not for individual lifts in either the snatch or clean and jerk. Likewise an athlete failing to register a snatch result cannot advance to the clean and jerk.

== Medal summary ==
=== Men ===
Event	Gold		Silver		Bronze	
52 kg	He Yicheng; Hunan	kg	Jiang Huagen; Shanghai	kg	Wu Sheng; Guangdong	kg
56 kg	Xiao Mingxiang; Guangxi	kg	Chen Manlin; Guangdong	kg	Gan Yunbiao; Guangxi	kg
60 kg	Liu Yingjian; Beijing	kg	Zhang Zhifang; Heilongjiang	kg	Lu Tianyou; Zhejiang	kg
67.5 kg	Gao Mingci; Guangdong	kg	Yang Xiucheng; Hebei	kg	Pan Liangzheng; Hubei	kg
75 kg	Miao Guosheng; Liaoning	kg	Chen Yuanhai; Guangdong	kg	Yuan Li; Beijing	kg
82.5 kg	Yang Guilin; Fujian	kg	Song Hongyu; Liaoning	kg	Yang Tangxian; Hubei	kg
90 kg	Qian Yukai; Beijing	kg	Tian Shulin; Tianjin	kg	Yu Shoujin; Shandong	kg
100 kg	Yang Huaiqing; Shandong	kg	Song Zhenzhu; Shandong	kg	Fang Xingyin; PLA	kg

== Medal table ==
Rank	Delegation	Gold	Silver	Bronze	Total
1	Beijing	2	0	1	3
2	Guangdong	1	2	1	4
3	Shandong	1	1	1	3
4	Liaoning	1	1	0	2
5	Guangxi	1	0	1	2
6	Fujian	1	0	0	1
6	Hunan	1	0	0	1
8	Hebei	0	1	0	1
8	Heilongjiang	0	1	0	1
8	Shanghai	0	1	0	1
8	Tianjin	0	1	0	1
12	Hubei	0	0	2	2
13	People's Liberation Army	0	0	1	1
13	Zhejiang	0	0	1	1
Totals (14 entries)		8	8	8	24
