= Ho Iat Seng =

Chief Executive of Macau from 2019 to 2024

Ho Iat Seng GLM GCIH
- 賀一誠
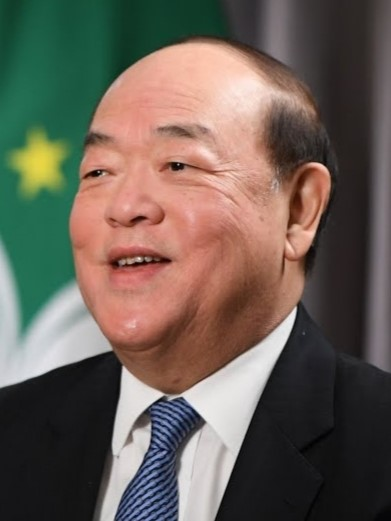
- Ho in 2021

3rd Chief Executive of Macau
- In office 20 December 2019 – 20 December 2024
- President: Xi Jinping
- Premier: Li Keqiang; Li Qiang
- Preceded by: Fernando Chui
- Succeeded by: Sam Hou Fai

President of the Legislative Assembly
- In office 16 October 2013 – 5 July 2019
- Vice President: Lam Heong Sang; Chui Sai Cheong
- Preceded by: Lau Cheok Va
- Succeeded by: Kou Hoi In

Vice-President of the Legislative Assembly
- In office 15 October 2009 – 16 October 2013
- President: Lau Cheok Va
- Preceded by: Lau Cheok Va
- Succeeded by: Lam Heong Sang

Member of the Legislative Assembly
- In office 20 September 2009 – 5 July 2019
- Preceded by: Susana Chou
- Constituency: Business (FC)

Member of the Standing Committee of the National People's Congress (9th, 10th, 11th, 12th)
- In office 5 March 2001 – 23 April 2019
- Chairman: Li Peng; Wu Bangguo; Zhang Dejiang

Personal details
- Born: 12 June 1957 (age 68) Portuguese Macau
- Spouse: Cheng Soo Ching
- Parent(s): Ho Tin (father); Wu Kwan (mother)
- Relatives: Ho Teng Iat (elder sister)
- Education: Zhejiang University (BS)

Chinese name
- Traditional Chinese: 賀一誠
- Simplified Chinese: 贺一诚
Transcriptions
Standard Mandarin
- Hanyu Pinyin: Hè Yīchéng
- Wade–Giles: Ho^{4} Yi^{1}-chʻêng^{2}
Yue: Cantonese
- Jyutping: Ho^{6} Jat^{1} Sing^{4}
- IPA: [hɔ˨ jɐt̚˥.sɪŋ˩]

Ho Iat Seng GLM GCIH (born 12 June 1957) is a Macau politician who served as the third chief executive of Macau from 2019 to 2024.

== Early life ==
Born in Macau to his parents from Jinhua, Zhejiang, Ho studied at Pooi To Middle School. In 1992, he studied electronic engineering and economics at Zhejiang University in Zhejiang; he would later become a visiting fellow of the university.

== Political career ==
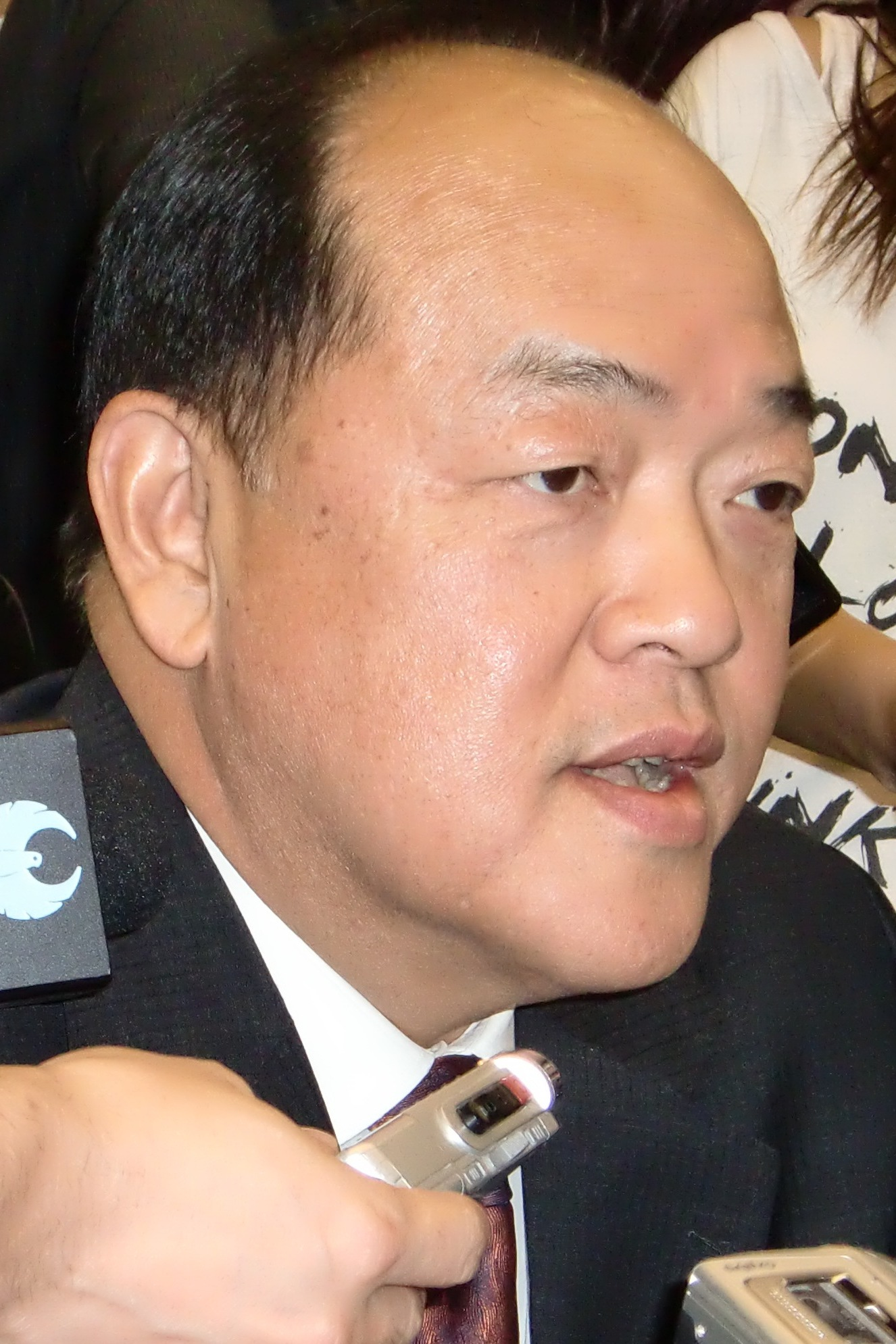
Ho in 2009

Ho served as a member of the Chinese People's Political Consultative Conference of Zhejiang Province from 1978 to 1998. In 2000, he was selected as the National People's Congress member representing Macau and became a member of the Standing Committee in 2001. From 2004 to 2009, he served as a member of the Executive Council of Macau. In 2009, he was elected as a member of the Legislative Assembly of Macau; from 2013 to 2019, he served as its vice-president and between 2014 and 2017 its president. On 18 April 2019, Ho announced his intention to run for election in August as Macau's chief executive.

Ho was elected as chief executive on 25 August 2019, and was subsequently appointed by Li Keqiang, Premier of China. He was officially sworn in as the third chief executive of Macau on 20 December, coinciding with the 20th anniversary of Macau's handover to China.

On 21 August 2024, Ho announced that he would not seek another term as chief executive in elections scheduled for October, citing ill health.

== Election results ==
=== Legislative Assembly ===
Year	Candidate	Hare quota	Mandate	List Votes	List Pct
2009	Ho Iat Seng (OMKC)	uncontested	FC	uncontested	∅
2013	Ho Iat Seng (OMKC)	walkover	FC	walkover	∅
2017	Ho Iat Seng (OMKC)	781	FC	walkover	∅

=== Chief Executive ===
Year	Candidate	Votes	Pct
2019	Ho Iat Seng	392	98.00%

== Honours ==
- Grand Cross of the Order of Prince Henry, Portugal (20 April 2023)

== See also ==
- List of members of the Legislative Assembly of Macau

Political offices
Preceded by Fernando Chui	Chief Executive of Macau; 2019–2024	Succeeded by Sam Hou Fai
