= Edmund Ho =

Macau politician (born 1955)

Edmund Ho Ho Hau Wah GML GCM GOIH
- 何厚鏵
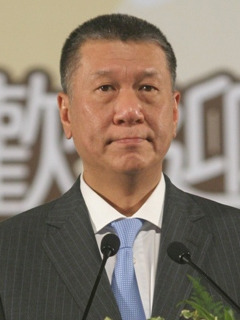
- Ho in 2006

1st Chief Executive of Macau
- In office 20 December 1999 – 20 December 2009
- President: Jiang Zemin; Hu Jintao
- Premier: Zhu Rongji; Wen Jiabao
- Preceded by: Position Established; Vasco Joaquim Rocha Vieira (Governor of Macau)
- Succeeded by: Fernando Chui

Vice Chairman of the Chinese People's Political Consultative Conference
- Incumbent
- Assumed office 13 March 2010
- Chairman: Jia Qinglin; Yu Zhengsheng; Wang Yang; Wang Huning

Secretary for Transport and Public Works
- Acting; 6 December 2006 – 14 February 2007
- Chief Executive: Himself
- Preceded by: Ao Man Long
- Succeeded by: Lau Si Io

Vice-President of the Legislative Assembly
- In office 10 November 1988 – 20 December 1999
- President: Carlos d'Assumpção
- Preceded by: Office established
- Succeeded by: Lau Cheok Va

Personal details
- Born: 13 March 1955 (age 71) Portuguese Macau
- Party: Independent
- Spouse: Tatiana Lau
- Children: Justin Ho King Man and Charmaine Ho Mei Chee
- Parent: Ho Yin
- Relatives: Ho Hau Veng (elder brother); Adrian Ho King-hong, Eric Ho King-fung, Kevin Ho King-lun (nephews)
- Education: Schulich School of Business; York University (BBA)
- Profession: Chartered accountant

Edmund Ho
- Traditional Chinese: 何厚鏵
- Simplified Chinese: 何厚铧
Transcriptions
Standard Mandarin
- Hanyu Pinyin: Hé Hòuhuá
Yue: Cantonese
- Jyutping: ho4 hau5 waa4

Edmund Ho Hau Wah, GML, GCM, GOIH (born 13 March 1955) is a Macau politician who served as the first Chief Executive of the Macau Special Administrative Region from 1999 to 2009. He currently serves as a Vice-Chairman of the Chinese People's Political Consultative Conference.

Edmund Ho was made Chief Executive-elect on 15 May 1999 by the Selection Committee for the Chief Executive of the Macau SAR. He was appointed Chief Executive-designate on 20 May of the same year by the Premier of the State Council, Zhu Rongji, and was formally sworn in as Chief Executive at the special ceremony marking the establishment of the Macau SAR on 20 December 1999.

== Biography ==
Ho was born on 13 March 1955 in Portuguese Macau, to parents of Cantonese descent and origin with family roots in Panyu, Guangzhou, in neighbouring Guangdong. He is the son of the prominent Macau community leader and businessman Ho Yin and Chan Keng (陳瓊). He is married, with a son, Justin King Man (何敬民) and a daughter, Charmaine Mei-chee, joint president of the Hong Kong Society of the Academy for Performing Arts. Some of his nephews occupy key political roles: Adrian Ho is a current Hong Kong Legislative Council member, Eric Ho King-fung is a committee member of the Chinese People’s Political Consultative Conference and Kevin Ho King-lun is a Macau representative at the National People’s Congress.

== Education ==
After completing his primary education, Ho went to study in Canada in 1969. He went on to graduate with a degree in Bachelor of Business Administration from York University, Faculty of Administrative Studies (now known as Schulich School of Business) in 1978, and qualified as a chartered accountant and certified auditor in 1981. After working for a couple of years in an accounting firm in India, he was transferred to the United States in 1982.

== Career in business ==
Ho returned to Macau and started himself on a business and political career in 1983, undertaking social activities and community service. His business interests ranged from accounting, finance and banking, insurance, public transportation, mass media, technology, land development to public utilities and he assumed various positions as auditor with KPMG, executive director and general manager of Tai Fung Bank (大豐銀行), chairman of Transmac, vice-chairman of the board of directors of Macau International Airport Company (CAM), vice-chairman of the General Assembly of Air Macau, chairman of the board of the MASC Ogden Aviation Services, vice-president of the board of directors of Teledifusão de Macau (Macau Television) among others.

== Politics ==
Ho's political career began in 1986, when he became a member of the Chinese People's Political Consultative Conference (CPPCC). Two years later, he was elected deputy to the National People's Congress (NPC). He was elected to the Standing Committee of both the eighth and ninth NPCs.

Ho then joined the local legislature in 1988, and was Vice-President of the Legislative Council of Macau for 11 consecutive years (1988–1999).

Ho had been involved in the preparatory work for Macau's return to the People's Republic of China ever since the Sino-Portuguese Joint Declaration on the Question of Macau came into effect. He was appointed Vice-President of the Drafting Committee of the Basic Law of the Macau Special Administrative Region (MSAR) of the People's Republic of China in 1988. The following year, he became Vice-President of the Consultative Committee of the Basic Law of the MSAR. He was appointed Vice-President of the Preparatory Committee of the MSAR in 1998. Ho was also Convenor of the Land Fund Investment Commission of the MSAR of the PRC.

Over the years, Ho has been leader of a number of industrial, financial, educational, charity and sports institutions and associations. He was Chairman of the Macau Association of Banks from its foundation in 1985, Vice-President of the Macau Chamber of Commerce, Vice-Chairman of the All-China Federation of Industry and Commerce, Vice-President of the Economic Council of the Macau Government, Vice-Chairman of the Kiang Wu Hospital Board of Charity, Vice-Chairman of the Tung Sin Tong Charitable Institution, chairman of the board of directors of the University of Macau, Vice-chairman of the board of directors of Jinan University, Guangzhou, President of the Executive Committee of the Macau Olympic Committee, and President of the Macau Golf Association.

== Honours ==
- Macau:
  - Grand Lotus Medal of Honour - 2010
- Portugal:
  - Grand Officer of the Order of Prince Henry (GOIH)
  - Grand Cross of the Order of Merit (GCM)

== Election results ==
=== Legislative Assembly ===
Year	Candidate	Hare quota	Mandate	List Votes	List Pct
1988	Edmund Ho	uncontested	FC	uncontested	∅
1992	Edmund Ho	walkover	FC	walkover	∅
1996	Edmund Ho	walkover	FC	walkover	∅

=== Chief Executive ===
Year	Candidate	Votes	Pct
1999	Edmund Ho	163	81.90%
2004	Edmund Ho	296	98.67%

Political offices
Preceded by Vasco Joaquim Rocha Vieira as Governor of Macau	Chief Executive of Macau; 1999–2009	Succeeded by Fernando Chui Sai On
Preceded by Position established	Vice-President of the Legislative Assembly of Macau; 1988–1999	Succeeded by Lau Cheok Va
Preceded by TBD	Member of the Legislative Assembly of Macau; 1988–1999	Succeeded by TBD
Preceded by Ao Man Long	Secretary for Transport and Public Works of Macau; Acting; 2006–2007	Succeeded by Lau Si Io
