= Dr. Carlos d'Assumpção Park =

Coordinates: 22°11′19.6″N 113°33′3.0″E

- 宋玉生公園; Jardim Dr. Carlos d'Assumpção
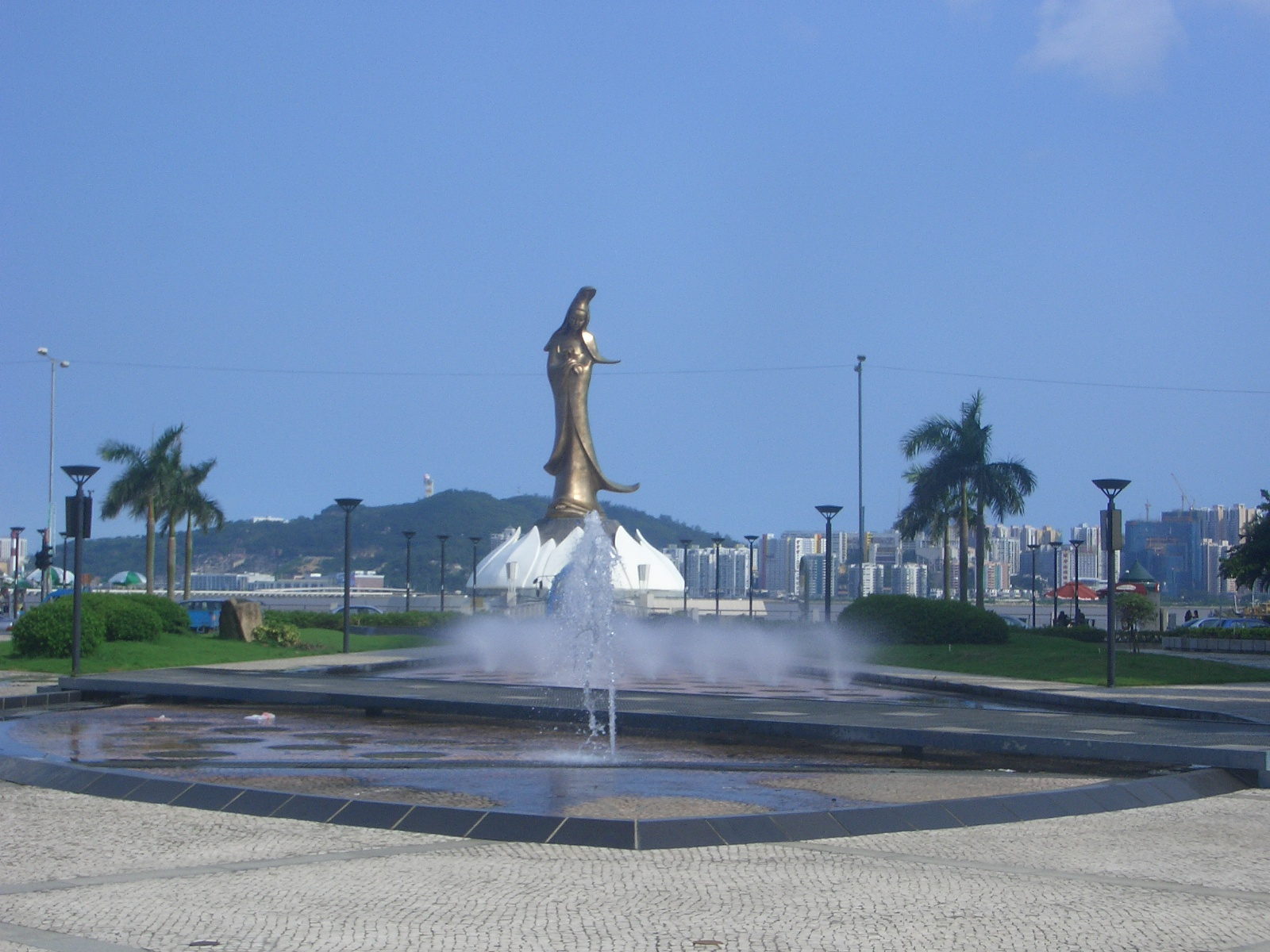
- Interactive map of Dr. Carlos d'Assumpção Park
- Type: Park
- Location: Alameda Dr. Carlos D'Assumpção; Sé, Macau

Dr. Carlos d'Assumpção Park

Chinese name
- Traditional Chinese: 宋玉生公園
- Simplified Chinese: 宋玉生公园
Transcriptions
Standard Mandarin
- Hanyu Pinyin: Sòng Yùshēng Gōngyuán
Yue: Cantonese
- Jyutping: sung3 juk6 gung1 sang1 jyun4*2

Portuguese name
- Portuguese: Jardim Dr. Carlos d'Assumpção

Dr. Carlos d'Assumpção Park (Chinese: 宋玉生公園; Portuguese: Jardim Dr. Carlos d'Assumpção) is a water-side park in Sé, Macau. Named after the Macanese leader Carlos d'Assumpção, it is located on Avenida Dr. Carlos d'Assumpção and besides the Garden of Commander Ho Yin.

The park features:

- Kun Lam statue
- arbor
- playground
- fountains
- ponds
- promenade along the Outer Harbour

== See also ==
- List of tourist attractions in Macau
- Carlos d'Assumpção
