= Ma Man-kei =

Chinese-Macau businessman and politician

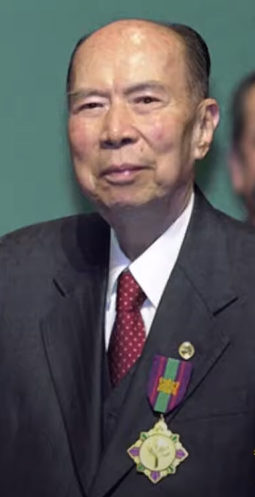
Ma Man-kei

Ma Man-kei GML (Chinese: 馬萬祺; pinyin: Mǎ Wànqí; Jyutping: Maa^{5} Maan^{6}-kei^{4}; October 1919 – May 26, 2014) was a Chinese-Macau businessman, tycoon, entrepreneur and politician. A strong supporter of the Chinese Communist Party, Ma was a proponent of the transfer of sovereignty over Macau from Portugal to the People's Republic of China, which took place in 1999. Ma was vice chairman of the Chinese People's Political Consultative Conference's (CPPCC) eighth, ninth, tenth and eleventh sessions, beginning in 1993.

Ma was born in 1919 in Nanhai County, Guangdong. He moved to Hong Kong and opened his first business during the late 1930s. He later went to Macau in the 1940s and expanded his business. He aided the Chinese Communist Party during the 1950s by importing commodities from Macau and Hong Kong to mainland China.

Ma served as the vice chairman of the committee which drafted the basic laws for the Macau Special Administrative Region and had a hand in the territory's transfer. He was also president of the Macau Chamber of Commerce for life. Ma was a former member of the Legislative Assembly of Macau.

Ma was also the chairman of the Chinese Literature Foundation. Deng Xiaoping penned the title for one of Ma Man-kei's poems in 1998.

In 2001, Ma was one of the first recipients of the Grand Lotus Medal of Honour.

Ma died at a Beijing hospital on May 26, 2014, at the age of 95, where he had been hospitalized with heart disease for several years. His funeral was held at the Macau Forum.

Minor planet 228158 Mamankei is named in his honor.
