= Joaquim Letria =

Portuguese journalist (1943–2026)

Joaquim José da Conceição Letria (Lisbon, 8 November 1943 – 16 October 2026) was a Portuguese journalist. A key figure in Portuguese media, he founded two weekly newspapers, O Jornal and Tal & Qual. He received the 1974 Portuguese Press Award in 1974, in the Television category.

== Life and career ==
His career began at age 18 at Diário de Lisboa in 1961. He later moved to Flama magazine and Rádio Clube Português. He worked at Associated Press for seven years before returning temporarily to Lisbon, where he returned to Diário de Lisboa. Shortly after, he got a job at the BBC and moved to London. He was a member of the Portuguese Communist Party until 1968.

After the Carnation Revolution, he decided to return to Portugal, working at Radiotelevisão Portuguesa (RTP) as vice-director in non-daily news and current affairs programming. His firing was discussed fifteen days after his return, given that president Spínola declared to RTP's directive that "that bearded guy will never appear on TV", upon knowing that he had interviewed "terrorist" Pedro Pires. However, Letria continued working, and the then-president idd not insist in its censorship.

Letria received the 1974 Prémio da Imprensa, or Prémio Bordalo, granted by Casa da Imprensa in 1977, as a "TV Figure" in the "Television Category", "for the vivacity and personal tone he gave to his job", in a ceremony where, in the same category, A Política é de Todos (Álvaro Guerra) was declared as the "Best Program".

He took part in the founding of weekly newspaper O Jornal, in the spring of 1975, following, shortly afterwards, to national news agency ANOP.

Letria returned to RTP in 1978, to do and present its second channel's news program, Informação 2. In the period that followed, he created two programs which turned him more popular among the wider audience, Directíssimo and Tal & Qual, which combined news and entertainment, this last one having the popular segment Apanhados.

After the victory of the Democratic Alliance in the 1979 Portuguese legislative election, RTP decided, in 1980, to withdraw Letria from RTP2's direction and end his program Tal & Qual. Joaquim Letria eventually founded a weekly newspaper with the same name, Tal & Qual (1980–2007), in July 1980.

In late 1980, he took part in Ramalho Eanes' campaign for the presidenciais and, when Eanes began functions, Letria took the role of spokesman of the president at the Assembly of the Republic, a post he maintained until 1986.

On 19 April 1986, Joaquim José da Conceição Letria received the Great Cross of the Military Order of Christ.

Returning to RTP, he presented Já Está where he interviewed D. Maria Pia de Saxe-Coburgo e Bragança, supposed legitimate daughter of D. Carlos I of Portugal. However, he left RTP in 1988 after accepting an invitation from Pedro Santana Lopes to become the director of a new weekly newsmagazine, Sábado, which he held until January 1992, where he left its direction and became a columnist until its closure in 1993. He then returned to RTP, this time on RTP Internacional, where he presented its daily magazine Rosa dos Ventos.

In the early 1990s, he presented Apanhados on TV2, wich sketches from José Pedro Gomes and António Feio.

In 1995, he presented the late night talk show Conversa Afiada which aired on Canal 1. He presented another one on RTP Internacional, Café Lisboa, with Agostinho Roseta and José Amaral.

In 1996, he presented Cobras e Lagartos on Antena 1. OIt was suspended due to a controversy related to the Angolan government and Letria was fired from the station, which he considered to be a malicious orchestration. The edition broadcast on 18 August 1998 reached the courts and, despite two instances where they considered the "expressions used that could be considered of a bad taste" (TIC) or that "Joaquim Letria, voluntarily, defamed and criticized a group of people because of their race, color or ethnic origin'" (DIAP), it was decided that the criminal complaint presented "did not act with the attempt at inciting or encouraging racial discrimination".

He subsequently wrote a book, A Verdade Confiscada. Escândalo - A Armadilha da Nova Censura (1998), collaborated with Rádio Comercial and with daily newspaper 24 Horas, taught at Universidade Lusíada and made communications consultancy. He kept a relation with television through documentary production.

In 2001, he was sued for defaming the mayor of Castelo de Paiva, Antero Gaspar, as a "fraudster" regarding the fall of the Entre-os-Rios bridge. The journalist won the suit, the Portuguese State, however, remedied Letria, per a decision of the European Human Rights Court.

In 2014, after being away from television for over seventeen years, he presented a regular segment in Fátima Lopes' program on Televisão Independente, A Tarde é Sua.

Letria died on 16 October 2026, at the age of 82.
