= Leonel Alberto Alves =

Macanese politician

Leonel Alberto Alves Ao On Lei
- 歐安利
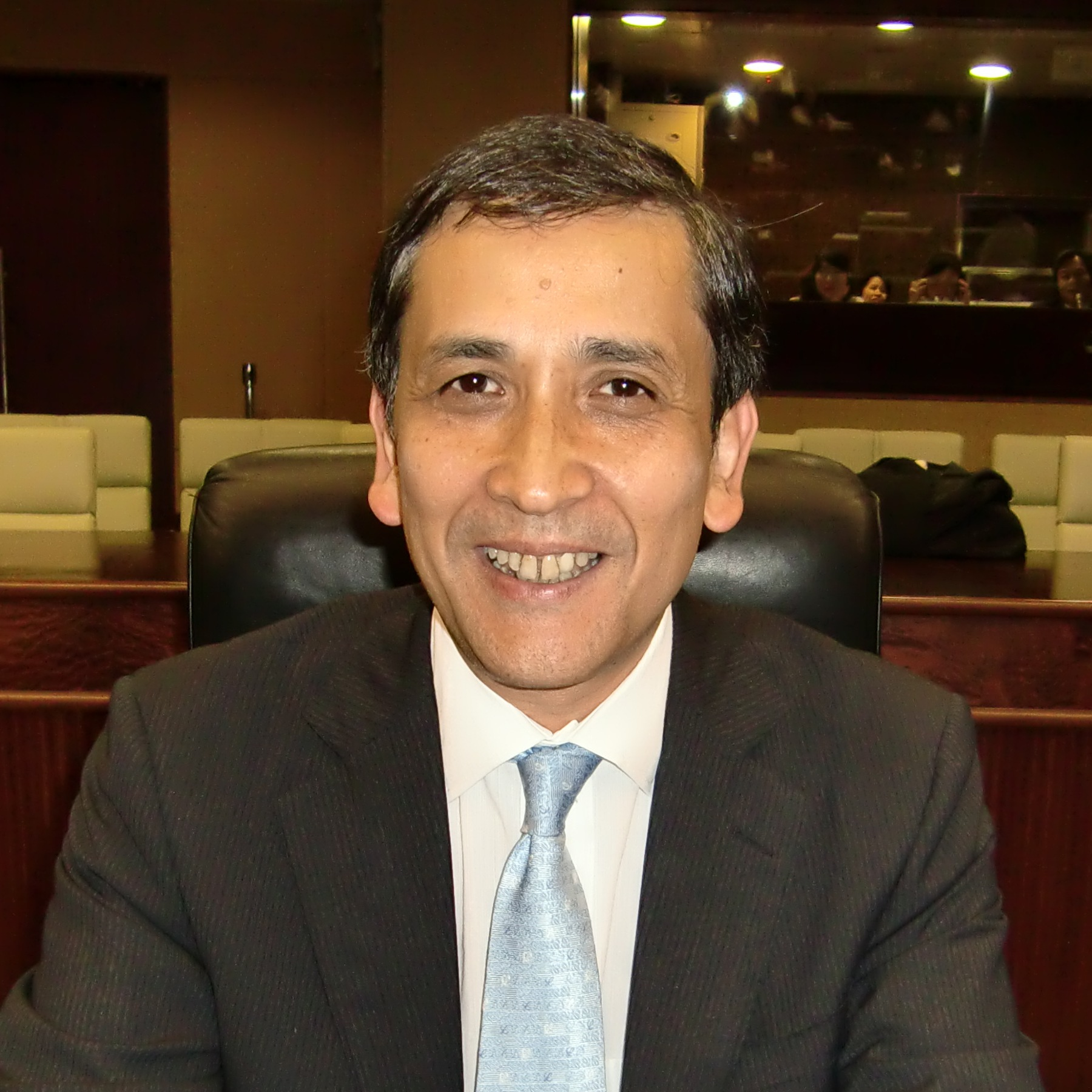

First Secretary of the Legislative Assembly of Macau
- In office 3 October 1996 – 15 October 2009
- Succeeded by: Chui Sai Cheong

Member of the Legislative Assembly
- Incumbent
- Assumed office 18 October 1988
- Constituency: Professional (FC)
- In office 28 August 1984 – 18 October 1988
- Constituency: Macau (Directly elected)

Personal details
- Born: April 5, 1957 (age 69) Portuguese Macau

Leonel Alberto Alves
- Traditional Chinese: 歐安利
- Simplified Chinese: 欧安利
Transcriptions
Standard Mandarin
- Hanyu Pinyin: Ōu Ānlì
Yue: Cantonese
- Jyutping: au1 on1 lei6

Leonel Alberto Alves (Chinese: 歐安利; born 5 April 1957 in Macau) is a member and a former First Secretary of the Legislative Assembly of Macau (1996–2009). In 2005, Alves became a member of the Executive Council of Macau and in 2008, he became a local member of the National Committee of the Chinese People's Political Consultative Conference.

Born to a Portuguese father and a Chinese mother, Alves became a Chinese citizen in 2004, renouncing his Portuguese nationality.

== Election results ==
Year	Candidate	Hare quota	Mandate	List Votes	List Pct
1984	Leonel Alberto Alves (UE)	4,000	No.4/6	16,003	58.87%
1988	Leonel Alberto Alves (UE)	1,049	No.6/6	6,298	31.41%
1992	Leonel Alberto Alves (UIPM)	uncontested	FC	uncontested	∅
1996	Leonel Alberto Alves (UIPM)	walkover	FC	walkover	∅
2001	Leonel Alberto Alves (UIPM)	walkover	FC	walkover	∅
2005	Leonel Alberto Alves (UIPM)	walkover	FC	walkover	∅
2009	Leonel Alberto Alves (UIPM)	walkover	FC	walkover	∅

== See also ==
- List of members of the Legislative Assembly of Macau
