= Grand Lotus Medal of Honour =

- Native name: Medalhas de honra de Grande Lótus 大蓮花榮譽勳章
- Awarded for: Providing exceptional services to the Macao SAR, in its image and good name, both in the Region and abroad, or for providing services, in any domain, of great relevance to the development of the Macao SAR.
- Country: Macau
- Post-nominals: GML
- Established: 2001
- First award: 2001

Precedence
- Next (lower): Golden Lotus Medal of Honour

The Grand Lotus Medal of Honour (Portuguese: Medalhas de honra de Grande Lótus; Chinese: 大蓮花榮譽勳章; pinyin: Dà liánhuā róngyù xūnzhāng) is the highest award under the Macau SAR honors and awards system which recognizes lifelong and highly significant contributions to the well-being of Macau.

== List of recipients ==
Year	Winners
2001	Ma Man Kei
2001	Tong Seng Chiu
2002	Ke Zheng Ping
2003	Susana Chou
2006	Chui Tank Kei
2007	Stanley Ho
2007	Leong Sut U
2009	Lei Seng Chon
2009	Ho Sai Lun
2010	Edmund Ho
2012	Lao Kuong Po
2013	Lau Cheok Va
2020	Fernando Chui
2020	Zhong Nanshan
