= Tal & Qual =

Weekly newspaper in Portugal

The article that was the subject of the McCann's legal action.

Tal & Qual (Tal e Qual, Portuguese pronunciation: [taliˈkwal]; loose translation: Just Like That) is a weekly Portuguese tabloid newspaper published between 1980 and 2007 and started a second series in 2021. The paper is based in Lisbon.

== History and profile ==
Tal & Qual first appeared in July 1980 and was published weekly on Fridays. The newspaper was owned by the Projornal media company. Then it became part of the Controlinveste group. It had a populist stance and was a sensationalist weekly. Its last edition came out on 28 September 2007. The paper closed because of a drop in circulation, down from over 21,000 in 2004 to 13,000 by the end of 2006.

On 31 August 2007, the parents of Madeleine McCann announced that they were suing the newspaper for libel after the newspaper reported that the "police believe" Kate and Gerry McCann killed Madeleine, suggesting she may have died in an accident or from a drugs overdose. The police stressed that the McCanns were not suspects (at the time: they later became so), but Tal & Qual stood by the story. The journalist who wrote the article, Catarina Vaz Guerreiro, said "I can't reveal my source, but I have complete trust in them. I strongly believe that the person that gave us this information is telling the truth."

Tal & Qual returned to print in May 2021, published by Párem as Máquinas, a reporter's company. Most of the shareholders are old Tal&Qual journalists. It's now the second most sold weekly newspaper. Jorge Morais also returned as director and José Paulo Fafe (former editor-in-chief) as the publisher.
