= Chui Sai Cheong =

Chui Sai Cheong OMP
- 崔世昌
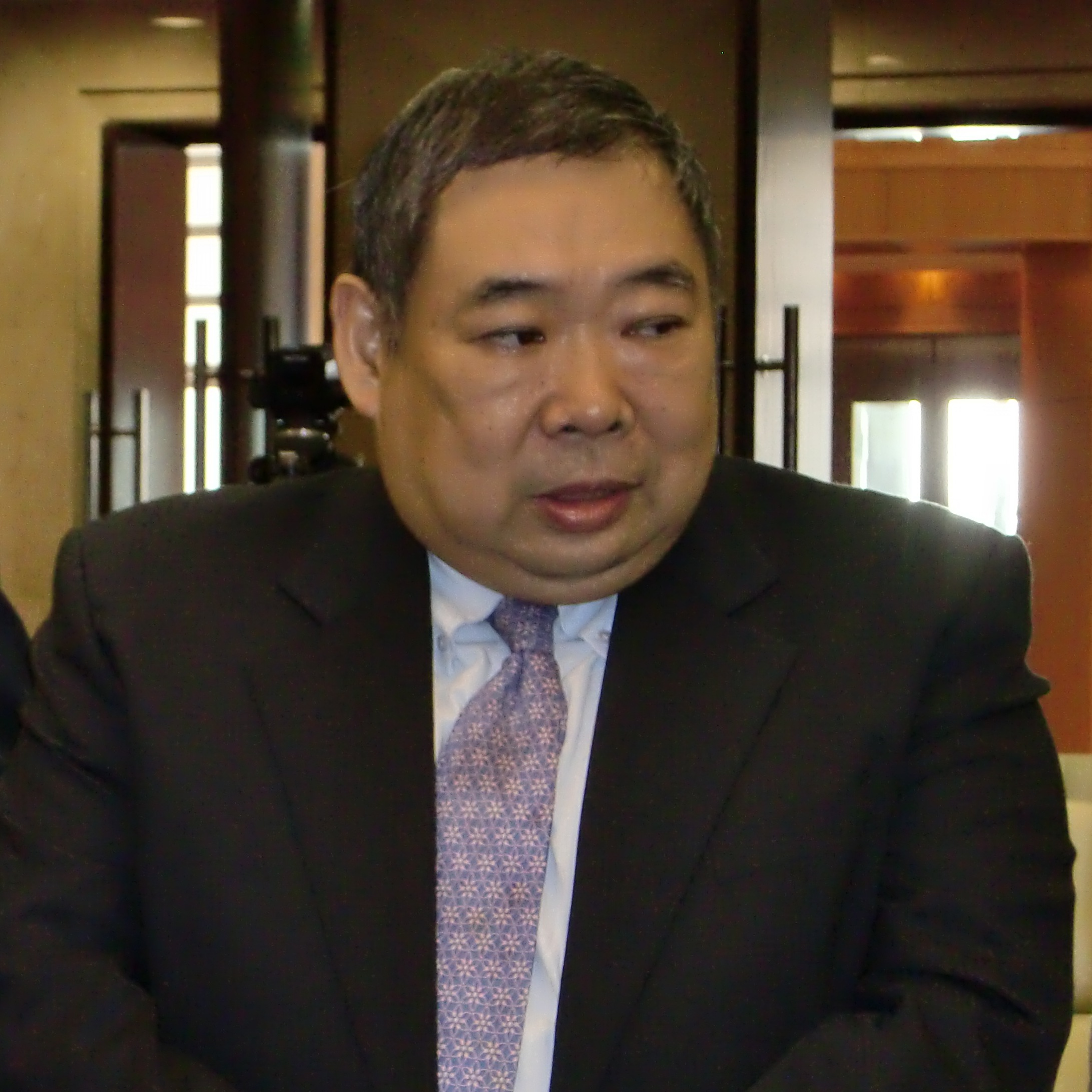
- Chui in 2009

Vice-President of the Legislative Assembly
- Incumbent
- Assumed office 16 October 2017
- President: Lau Cheok Va
- Preceded by: Lau Cheok Va

First Secretary of the Legislative Assembly
- In office 15 October 2009 – 16 October 2017
- Preceded by: Leonel Alberto Alves
- Succeeded by: Kou Hoi In

Member of the Legislative Assembly
- Incumbent
- Assumed office 20 December 1999
- Constituency: Business (FC)

Personal details
- Born: 19 February 1954 (age 72) Portuguese Macau

Chui Sai Cheong
- Traditional Chinese: 崔世昌
- Simplified Chinese: 崔世昌
Transcriptions
Standard Mandarin
- Hanyu Pinyin: Cuī Shìchāng
Yue: Cantonese
- Jyutping: ceoi1 sai3 coeng1

Chui Sai Cheong (Chinese: 崔世昌; born 19 February 1954 in Macau) is a member and the First Secretary of the Legislative Assembly of Macau. He is the older brother of Fernando Chui the former Chief Executive of Macau and cousin of José Chui also a member of the Legislative Assembly.

== Election results ==
Year	Candidate	Hare quota	Mandate	List Votes	List Pct
1999	Chui Sai Cheong (OMCY)	uncontested	FC - Professional	uncontested	∅
2001	Chui Sai Cheong (OMCY)	uncontested	FC - Professional	uncontested	∅
2005	Chui Sai Cheong (OMCY)	walkover	FC - Professional	walkover	∅
2009	Chui Sai Cheong (OMCY)	walkover	FC - Professional	walkover	∅
2017	Chui Sai Cheong (OMCY)	170.5	FC - Professional	341	62.45%
