= Susana Chou =

Macau politician

Susana Chou GML, GCM, ComMA, ComMI
- 曹其真
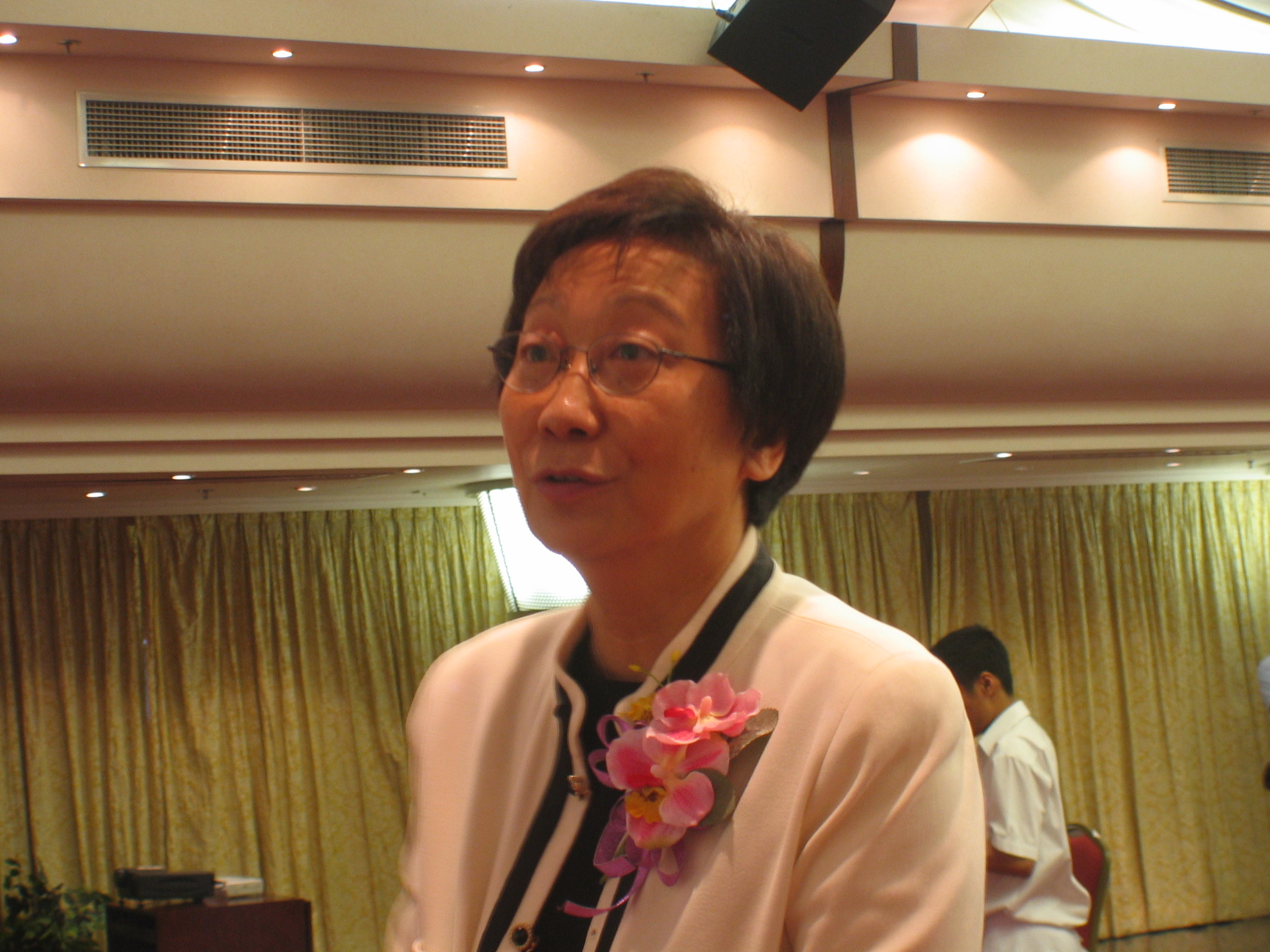

President of the Legislative Assembly
- In office 20 December 1999 – 15 October 2009
- Vice President: Lau Cheok Va
- Preceded by: Anabela Ritchie
- Succeeded by: Lau Cheok Va

Personal details
- Born: 3 December 1941 (age 84) Shanghai, China
- Parent: Chao Kuang Piu (father)
- Relatives: Silas Chou (brother); Veronica Chou (niece)
- Education: Anhui University; University of Paris
- Profession: chartered accountant

Susana Chou
- Chinese: 曹其真
Transcriptions
Standard Mandarin
- Hanyu Pinyin: Cáo Qízhēn
Yue: Cantonese
- Yale Romanization: Chòuh Kèih Jān
- Jyutping: cou4 kei4 zan1

Susana Chou Vaz da Luz GML (born 2 December 1941) is a Macau politician who served as the president of the Legislative Assembly of Macau from 1999 to 2009.

== Biography ==
Chou was born in Shanghai on 2 December 1941, and is the oldest daughter of Chao Kuang Piu, an industrial tycoon in Shanghai. Chou's ancestral hometown is the current Yinzhou District of the city of Ningbo in China's Zhejiang Province. While her father moved to Hong Kong after 1949, Chou remained in China until 1968 when she moved to Macau.

Chou studied physics and majored in radio technology at the Anhui University. She also studied French language and literature in Paris.

== Politics ==
In 1976, Chou participated in Portuguese Macau's first direct election of the Legislative Assembly, and was successful in the election. From 1984 to 1999, she served in the third, fourth, fifth and sixth sessions of Portuguese Macau's Legislative Assembly.

After the transfer of sovereignty over Macau from Portugal to China in 1999, Chou was elected as the president of the new Legislative Assembly for its first, second and third sessions. Her stress on efficiency and effectiveness, while praised by the government, in many ways curtailed policy debate and discussion with little public consultation.

== Election results ==
Year	Candidate	Party	Hare quota	Mandate	List Votes	List Pct
1976	Susana Chou Vaz da Luz	ADIM	374	No.5/6	1,497	54.95%
1984	Susana Chou Vaz da Luz		uncontested	FC	uncontested	∅
1988	Susana Chou Vaz da Luz		walkover	FC	walkover	∅
1992	Susana Chou Vaz da Luz	UFM	2,201	No.6/8	2,201	7.99%
1996	Susana Chou Vaz da Luz		uncontested	FC	uncontested	∅
2001	Susana Chou Vaz da Luz		walkover	FC	walkover	∅
2005	Susana Chou Vaz da Luz		walkover	FC	walkover	∅

== Honors and awards ==
- 1983, The Commander Degree of the Medal of Agriculture and Industrial Merit, by the President of the Portuguese Republic
- 1994, The Medal of the Knight of National Order of Merit, by the President of the French Republic
- 1994, The Medal of Industrial and Commercial Merit, by the Governor of Macau
- 1999, The Medal of Bravery, by the Governor of Macau
- 1999, The Grand Cross of the Order of Merit, by the President of the Portuguese Republic
- 2002, The Chevalier of the Legion of Honor, by the President of the French Republic
- 2003, The Grand Lotus Medal of Honour, by the Chief Executive of Macau
- 2007, The Officer of the Legion of Honor, by the President of the French Republic

== Extra information ==
- ChinaVitae: CV of Susana Chou (English)
- MacauNews: Brief biography of Susana Chou (English)

Preceded by Anabela Ritchie	President of the Legislative Assembly of Macau; 1999–2009	Succeeded by Lau Cheok Va
