= Jornal Tribuna de Macau =

Chinese name
- Traditional Chinese: 澳門論壇日報
- Simplified Chinese: 澳门论坛日报
- Literal meaning: Macau Forum Newspaper
Transcriptions
Standard Mandarin
- Hanyu Pinyin: Àomén Lùntán Rìbào
Yue: Cantonese
- Jyutping: ou3 mun4*2 leon6 taan4 jat6 bou3

Portuguese name
- Portuguese: Jornal Tribuna de Macau

The Jornal Tribuna de Macau (Chinese: 澳門論壇日報) is one of three Portuguese-language newspapers in Macau. It is published seven days a week, appearing in the morning, and covers both local and international news.

José Rocha Diniz is its director. The Jornal Tribuna, or JTM, was created with the merger of the Jornal de Macau and the Tribuna de Macau, two of the region's oldest Portuguese-language newspapers, both of which emerged in the 1980s.

The JTM is affiliated with the Portuguese newspaper Diário de Notícias, and says in its mission statement that its aim is to encourage the use of Portuguese and help Macau maintain ties with Portugal and the rest of the Portuguese-speaking world.
