= Indirectly elected member =

Type of constituency at the Macau legislative assembly

Some members in the Legislative Assembly of Macau are elected through indirect election (Portuguese: Sufrágio Indirecto; Chinese: 間接選舉), where only professional or special interest sectors are involved in the electoral process. Eligible voters in a functional constituency are designated legal entities such as organisations and corporations. There are proposals to change the electoral system.

Hong Kong's Legislative Council has a similar political system known as "functional constituency".

== Groups ==
Candidates stood in the indirect elections under a list. The prevailing lists since 2001 in each of the electoral sectors are as follows:

- Industry, Commerce and Finance sector (Sectores industrial, comercial e financeiro; 工商、金融界)
  - Nominated by OMKC (União dos Interesses Empresariais de Macau, 澳門僱主利益聯會, lit. Macau Business Interest Union).
  - The electoral sector was known as "Business" before 2013.
- Labour sector (Sector do trabalho; 勞工界)
  - Usually nominated by CCCAE (Comissão Conjunta da Candidatura das Associações de Empregados, 僱員團體聯合, lit. Employees Association Joint Candidature Commission).
- Professional sector (Sector profissional; 專業界)
  - Usually nominated by OMCY (União dos Interesses Profissionais de Macau, 澳門專業利益聯會, lit. Macau Union of Professional Interests)
- Culture and Sport (Sectores cultural e desportivo; 文化及體育界)
  - Nominated by União do Sol Nascente (旭昇文體聯合會) since 2021, and União Excelente (Associação União Cultural e Desportiva Excelente) (lit. Excellent Culture and Sports Union Association) between 2005 and 2017 elections, and DCAR - Healthy Macau in 2001 election.
  - Three separate sectors of "Moral", "Welfare", and "Culture" were established in 1976 election. In 1984 election they were merged to form the "Moral, Culture, Welfare" sector, and expanded into "Welfare, Culture, Education and Sport" in 1992 election. In 2013 the sector was split to create a new sector.
- Welfare and Education (Sectores dos serviços sociais e educacional; 社會服務及教育界)
  - Nominated by APSSE (Associação de Promoção do Serviço Social e Educação; 社會服務教育促進會, lit. Association for Promotion of Social Services and Education)
  - Created from "Welfare, Culture, Education and Sport" in 2013 election

== Members ==
| Election | Members | | | | | | | | | | | |
| Election | Moral | Welfare | Culture | Business | | | | | | | | |
|---|---|---|---|---|---|---|---|---|---|---|---|---|
| 1976 | L. Ribeiro | Chui Tak Kei | Rodrigues | Ma Man Kei | Peter Pan | Li Sai Veng | | | | | | |
| 1980 | D. Ribeiro | Chui Tak Kei | Martins | Ma Man Kei | Peter Pan | Li Sai Veng | | | | | | |
| 1980 (b) | D. Ribeiro | Chui Tak Kei | Martins | Ma Man Kei | Peter Pan | Victor Ng | | | | | | |
| 1984 | Moral, Culture, Welfare | | | Ma Man Kei | Peter Pan | Victor Ng | Susana Chou | Chui Tak Kei | | | | |
| 1984 | | | Roque Choi | Ma Man Kei | Peter Pan | Victor Ng | Susana Chou | Chui Tak Kei | | | | |
| 1988 | | | Edmund Ho | Ma Man Kei | Peter Pan | Victor Ng | Susana Chou | Lau Cheok Vá | | | | |
| 1992 | Welfare, Culture, Education and Sport | | | Ma Man Kei | Peter Pan | Victor Ng | Edmund Ho | Labour | | Professional | | |
| 1992 | | | Ritchie | Ma Man Kei | Peter Pan | Victor Ng | Edmund Ho | Lau Cheok Va | Pang Vai Kam | Leonel Alves | | |
| 1996 | | | Ritchie | Hoi Sai Iun | Susana Chou | Victor Ng | Edmund Ho | Lau Cheok Va | Kwan Tsui Hang | Leonel Alves | | |
| 1999 (b) | | | Ritchie | Hoi Sai Iun | Susana Chou | Victor Ng | Chui Sai Cheong | Lau Cheok Va | Kwan Tsui Hang | Leonel Alves | | |
| 2001 | | Fong Chi Keong | Chan Chak Mo | Hoi Sai Iun | Susana Chou | Cheang Chi Keong | Kou Hoi In | Lau Cheok Va | Tong Chi Kin | Leonel Alves | Chui Sai Cheong | |
| 2005 | | Vitor Cheung | Chan Chak Mo | Ho Iat Seng | Susana Chou | Cheang Chi Keong | Kou Hoi In | Lau Cheok Va | Lee Chong Cheng | Leonel Alves | Chui Sai Cheong | |
| 2009 | | Vitor Cheung | Chan Chak Mo | Ho Iat Seng | Fong Chi Keong | Cheang Chi Keong | Kou Hoi In | Lau Cheok Va | Lam Heong Sang | Leonel Alves | Chui Sai Cheong | |
| 2013 | Welfare and Education | Culture and Sport | | Industry, Commerce and Finance | | | | Lei Cheng I | Lam Heong Sang | Leonel Alves | Chui Sai Cheong | |
| 2013 | Chan Hong | Vitor Cheung | Chan Chak Mo | Ho Iat Seng | José Chui | Cheang Chi Keong | Kou Hoi In | Lei Cheng I | Lam Heong Sang | Leonel Alves | Chui Sai Cheong | Chan Iek Lap (UIMM in 2017) |
| 2017 | Chan Hong | Vitor Cheung | Chan Chak Mo | Ho Iat Seng | José Chui | Ip Sio Kai | Kou Hoi In | Lei Chan U | Lam Lon Wai | Vong Hin Fai | Chui Sai Cheong | Chan Iek Lap (UIMM in 2017) |
| 2019 (b) | Chan Hong | Vitor Cheung | Chan Chak Mo | Wong Sai Man | José Chui | Ip Sio Kai | Kou Hoi In | Lei Chan U | Lam Lon Wai | Vong Hin Fai | Chui Sai Cheong | Chan Iek Lap (UIMM in 2017) |
| 2021 | Ho Ion Sang | Leong On Kei | Chan Chak Mo | Wong Sai Man | José Chui | Ip Sio Kai | Kou Hoi In | Lei Chan U | Lam Lon Wai | Vong Hin Fai | Chui Sai Cheong | Chan Iek Lap (UIMM in 2017) |
| 2025 | Ho Ion Sang | Leong On Kei | Ma Chi Seng | Si Ka Lon | José Chui | Ip Sio Kai | Kevin Ho | Leong Pou U (UAT) | Lam Lon Wai | Vong Hou Piu | Iau Teng Pio | Wong Chon Kit |

== See also ==
- Corporatism
- Vocational panels in Ireland
- Rotten and pocket boroughs
- Functional constituency (Hong Kong)
