= Lau Cheok Vá =

Macau politician

Lau Cheok Vá GLM GML
- 劉焯華
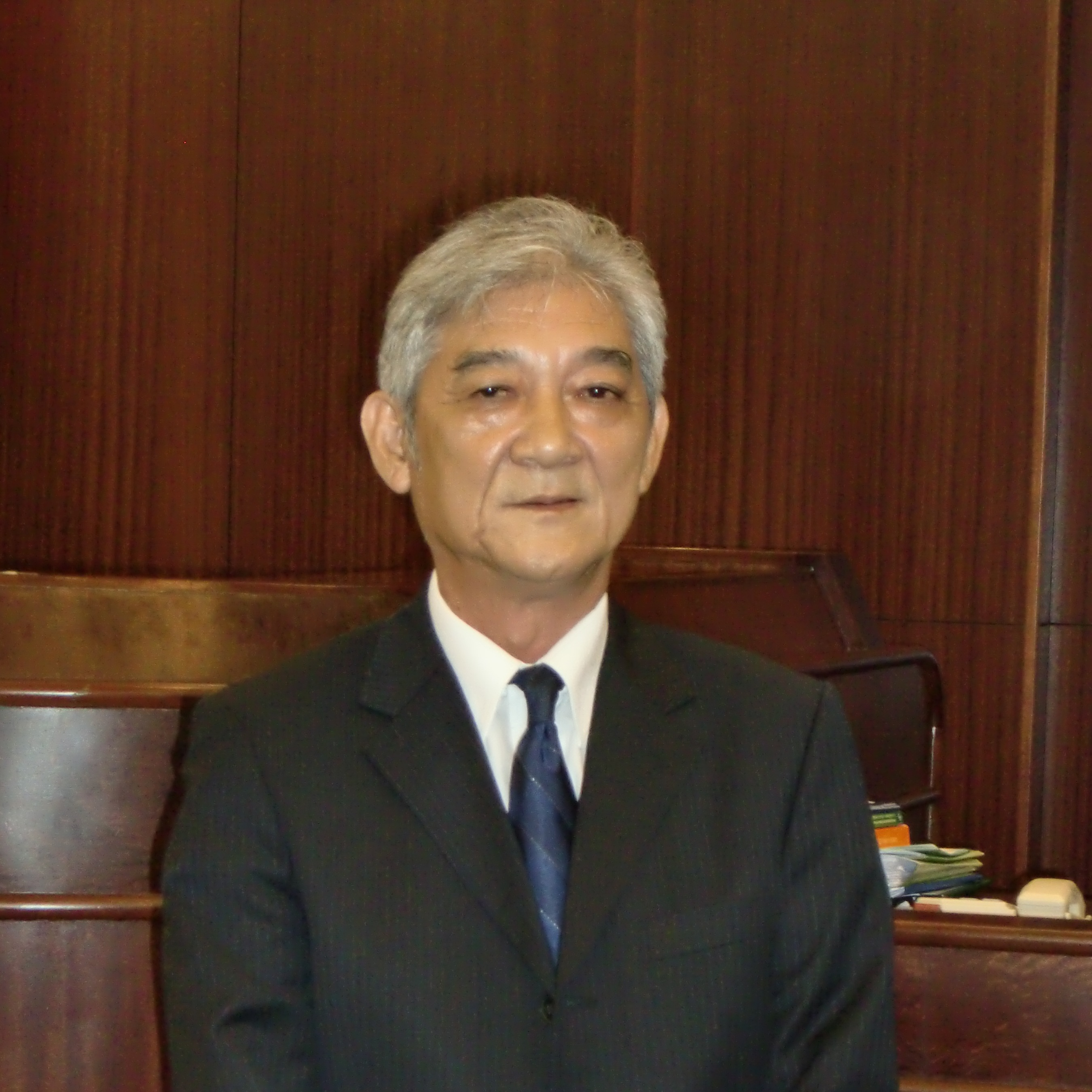

President of the Legislative Assembly
- In office 15 October 2009 – 16 October 2013
- Vice President: Ho Iat Seng
- Preceded by: Susana Chou
- Succeeded by: Ho Iat Seng

Vice-President of the Legislative Assembly
- In office 20 December 1999 – 15 October 2009
- President: Susana Chou
- Preceded by: Edmund Ho
- Succeeded by: Ho Iat Seng

Member of the Legislative Assembly
- Incumbent
- Assumed office 18 October 1988
- Constituency: Labor (FC)
- In office 28 August 1984 – 18 October 1988
- Constituency: Macau (Directly elected)

Personal details
- Born: 3 February 1945 (age 81) Portuguese Macau
- Occupation: public official, judge
- Profession: judge, lawyer

Lau Cheok Vá GLM GML (Chinese: 劉焯華) is a Macau politician who served as the President of the Legislative Assembly of Macau from 15 October 2009 to 16 October 2013. He is also served as Deputy to the 11th National People’s Congress of the People’s Republic of China, Vice-President of Macao Federation of Trade Unions and President of Judicial Officers Recommendation Commission. Previously he served as Vice-President of the Legislative Assembly from 1999 until 2009.

== Election results ==
Year	Candidate	Hare quota	Mandate	List Votes	List Pct
1984	Lau Cheok Vá (UE)	5,334	No.3/6	16,003	58.87%
1988	Lau Cheok Vá (UIEM)	uncontested	FC	uncontested	∅
1992	Lau Cheok Vá (UIEM)	walkover	FC	walkover	∅
1996	Lau Cheok Vá (UIEM)	walkover	FC	walkover	∅
2001	Lau Cheok Vá (UIEM)	walkover	FC	walkover	∅
2005	Lau Cheok Vá (UIEM)	walkover	FC	walkover	∅
2009	Lau Cheok Vá (UIEM)	walkover	FC	walkover	∅

Political offices
Preceded by Susana Chou Vaz da Luz	President of the Legislative Assembly of Macau; 2009–2013	Succeeded by Ho Iat Seng
Preceded by Edmund Ho Hau Wah	Vice-President of the Legislative Assembly of Macau; 1999–2009	Succeeded by Ho Iat Seng

== See also ==
- Court of Final Appeal (Macau)
- Politics of Macau
