= Francisco Pereira de Moura =

Portuguese scholar, economist and politician

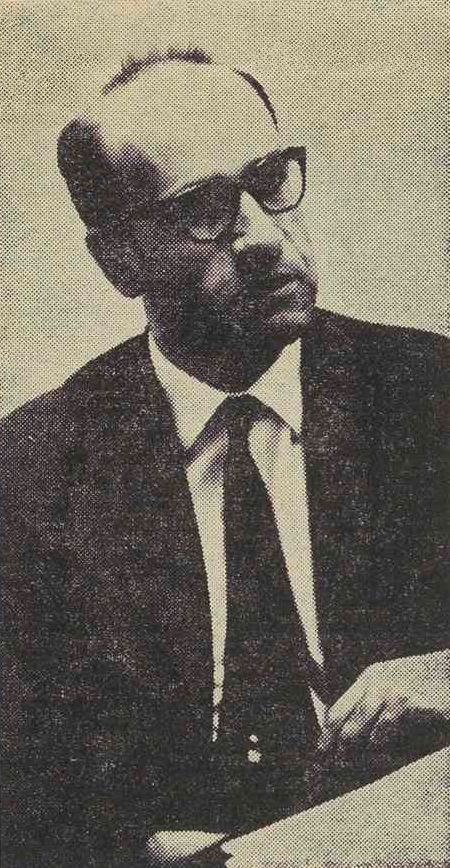
Francisco Pereira de Moura in 1969

Francisco Pereira de Moura (17 April 1925 – 4 April 1998) was a Portuguese scholar, economist and politician opposed to the Estado Novo regime. He led the United Democratic Electoral Commission in the rigged 1969 National Assembly election and, according to official numbers tallied about 10% of the vote, but failed to gain any representation in the assembly. He faced harassment by the General Security Directorate and was later forced to give up his job teaching economics. Following the Carnation Revolution he briefly served as Minister without Portfolio and Minister for Social Affairs, the latter in Vasco Gonçalves' administration.

Francisco Pereira de Moura was responsible for the re-design of the economics curriculum at the Instituto Superior de Economia e Gestão, ISEG (earlier called ISCEF, for Instituto Superior de Ciencias Economicas e Financeiras [1930] and ISE, Instituto Superior de Economia [1972], renamed ISEG in 1989), thus influencing for several decades the majority of economists in Portugal and beyond. Francisco Pereira de Moura is the author of a vast scientific legacy and authored the study that lead to the construction of the first steel mill in Portugal, still during the Estado Novo.
