= President of the Legislative Assembly of Macau =

- 澳門立法會主席
- Incumbent; Cheong Weng Chon since 16 October 2025
- Style: The Honourable (尊貴的) (formal)
- Nominator: Legislative Assembly
- Appointer: Legislative Assembly
- Term length: Four years, renewable
- Precursor: Governor of Macau
- Inaugural holder: Carlos d'Assumpção
- Formation: 31 March 1976

The President of the Legislative Assembly is the speaker of the Legislative Assembly of Macau. In the absence of the President, the Vice-President serves as President. The current President is Cheong Weng Chon since 16 October 2025.

== Presidents ==
=== Portuguese Macau ===
| No. | Name | Took office | Left office |
|---|---|---|---|
| — | Carlos D'Assumpção 宋玉生 | 31 March 1976 | 31 March 1984 |
| — | Carlos D'Assumpção 宋玉生 | 31 March 1984 | 20 April 1992 |
| — | Anabela Ritchie 林綺濤 | 20 April 1992 | 20 December 1999 |

=== Macau SAR ===
| No. | Portrait | Name | Took office | Left office | Constituency | Assembly |
|---|---|---|---|---|---|---|
| 1 | | Susana Chou Vaz da Luz 曹其真 | 20 December 1999 | 15 October 2009 | Industry, Commerce and Finance | 1st 2nd 3rd |
| 2 | | Lau Cheok Va 劉焯華 | 15 October 2009 | 16 October 2013 | Labour | 4th |
| 3 | | Ho Iat Seng 賀一誠 | 16 October 2013 | 5 July 2019 | Industry, Commerce and Finance | 5th |
| 3 | | Ho Iat Seng 賀一誠 | 16 October 2013 | 5 July 2019 | Industry, Commerce and Finance | 6th |
| — | | Chui Sai Cheong 崔世昌 | 5 July 2019 | 17 July 2019 | Professional | 6th |
| 4 | | Kou Hoi In 高開賢 | 17 July 2019 | 16 October 2025 | Industry, Commerce and Finance | 6th |
| 5 | | Cheong Weng Chon 張永春 | 16 October 2025 | Incumbent | Appointed | 7th |

== Vice-presidents ==
=== Portuguese Macau ===
| No. | Portrait | Name | Took office | Left office |
|---|---|---|---|---|
| — | | Edmund Ho Hau Wah 何厚鏵 | 10 November 1988 | 20 December 1999 |

=== Macau SAR ===
| No. | Portrait | Name | Took office | Left office | Constituency | Assembly |
|---|---|---|---|---|---|---|
| 1 | | Lau Cheok Va 劉焯華 | 20 December 1999 | 15 October 2009 | Labour | 1st 2nd 3rd |
| 2 | | Ho Iat Seng 賀一誠 | 15 October 2009 | 16 October 2013 | Industry, Commerce and Finance | 4th |
| 3 | | Lam Heong Sang 林香生 | 16 October 2013 | 16 October 2017 | Labour | 5th |
| 4 | | Chui Sai Cheong 崔世昌 | 16 October 2017 | 16 October 2025 | Professional | 6th |
| 5 | | Ho Ion Sang 何潤生 | 16 October 2025 | Incumbent | Welfare and Education | 7th |
