= Ho Yin =

Chinese businessman and politician (1908–1983)

Ho Yin ComB
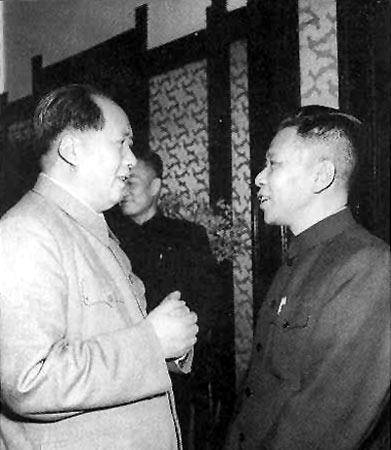
- Ho Yin (right) with Mao Zedong in 1956
- Born: 1 December 1908; Panyu, Guangdong, China
- Died: 6 December 1983 (aged 75); Queen Elizabeth Hospital, King's Park, British Hong Kong
- Children: 13, including Edmund

Chinese name
- Traditional Chinese: 何賢
- Simplified Chinese: 何贤
Transcriptions
Standard Mandarin
- Hanyu Pinyin: Hé Xián
Yue: Cantonese
- Yale Romanization: Hòh Yìhn
- Jyutping: Ho4 Jin4

Ho Yin ComB (Chinese: 何賢; 1 December 1908 – 6 December 1983) was a Macanese businessman, politician and senior leader of the Chinese community in Macau.

== Biography ==
Ho Yin was born in Panyu county, north of Macau on 1 December 1908. He was an important diplomatic intermediary between the Red China and the anti-Communist Estado Novo regime in Portugal, which existed between 1933 and 1974. He died in Macau on 6 December 1983.

His son, Edmund Ho, became the first Chief Executive of the Macau Special Administrative Region.

== Business career ==
=== In China and Hong Kong ===
His father, Ho Cheng-kai, was a small businessman, owning a small shop in Panyu. When Ho was only 13, he became an apprentice in a shop in Guangzhou, learning to manage it. At 16, he moved to Shunde, a traditional centre in the region of the Pearl River Delta, where he became an administrator of a grocer's shop. In 1930, he decided to invest in the money changing business, opening a store in Guangzhou. But in 1938, with the invasion of the Japanese to Guangdong, he was forced to move to Hong Kong, where he continued his business in the then British colony. His half-brother, Ho Tim, was already in business in Hong Kong, and would later become a director of the Hang Seng Bank.

=== In Macau ===
In 1941, the Japanese finally occupied Hong Kong and consequently Ho took refuge in Macau, then a colony of Portugal, who remained neutral during the Second World War. Shortly after his arrival, Ho, along with other entrepreneurs from Macau and Hong Kong, founded Tai Fung Money Changer Limited in 1942, which initially only carried out monetary transactions, but would later become Tai Fung Bank in 1972.

It was during the Second World War that Ho became rich and famous due to his business in the area of monetary transactions and the lucrative trade in gold, particularly in its major contribution to the stabilisation of the value of the pataca, the local currency, as well advising the Banco Nacional Ultramarino, responsible for issuing the pataca, on financial matters. At that time, the gold trade in Macau, specifically the import of gold, was controlled by a small group of businessmen from Macau and Hong Kong, including Ho Sin Hang, Cheng Yu Tung, YC Liang, and Pedro José Lobo, as well as Ho Yin.

After the Second World War, the gold trade was one of the most important economic activities in Macau, as Portugal was not then a signatory to the Bretton Woods Agreements, which had fixed exchange rates and restricted international trade in gold. These agreements also banned the import of gold for individual use and stipulated that each gold troy ounce cost US$35 legally.

Due to the banning and restriction of imports of gold in Hong Kong, covered by the agreements, Macau became one of the international centres unofficial trade (or smuggling) of gold. Gold smuggling in Macau was monopolised and handled by the Ng Fuk Tong or "Five Good Fortunes Association", itself a subsidiary of Tai Hing Company, the gambling monopoly. Granted in 1937, this monopoly was later awarded to Sociedade de Turismo e Diversões de Macau (STDM) in 1962. STDM was led by Stanley Ho, unrelated to Ho Yin.

With the death of Pedro José Lobo in 1965, Ho Yin became the most important Macau businessman, holding controlling interests in Macau's only bus and taxi companies, two of its Chinese language newspapers, all ten of its cinemas, five hotels, four banks and a greyhound track, where, in May 1966, he was the target of a grenade attack. Although he was injured, he survived. Later, his mansion was watched over by security guards.

In time, Ho would also gain greater prestige in Macau, especially within the Chinese community; in 1950, he became the President of the Chinese Chamber of Commerce, a post which he held until his death in 1983. He was also able to resolve conflicts between the various rival Chinese triads in Macau, as he knew all of their leaders, despite never having joined any triad society.

On 3 August 1971, Ho was made Commander of the Order of Volunteerism.

== Political career ==
Ho began his political career in the early 50s, after the establishment of the People's Republic of China, and became one of the most important political figures and influential Macau. As the anti-communist and authoritarian Estado Novo regime of António Salazar only recognised Taiwan ruled by Nationalist General Chiang Kai-shek as the "Republic of China", Ho became an important diplomatic intermediary between Lisbon and Beijing.

He kept in close contact with the Chinese Central People's Government and made numerous visits to Beijing, where he often exchanged views on Macau issues with Mao Zedong, Zhou Enlai and many major Chinese Communist Party officials. Ho was accorded the status of "special guest" at the Chinese People's Political Consultative Conference from the second session of its National Committee, which was held in Beijing between 30 January and 7 February 1956.

Ho participated in and contributed to the resolution of various disagreements between Portugal and China. The first major confrontation was the Sino-Portuguese military confrontation in 1952 at the Portas do Cerco border gate. This erupted following the sales embargo imposed on China by Portugal, under pressure from its Western allies, and a visit by the Portuguese Overseas Minister, Sarmento Rodrigues.

Between 25 and 31 July, a series of conflicts ensued, which left the Portuguese with one dead and twenty injured, and the Chinese with two dead and nine wounded. Ho formed part of a delegation to Beijing, which was able to secure a written apology and compensation from the Portuguese administration in Macau.

The second conflict was the 12-3 incident in 1966, organised by pro-communist Chinese in Macau. Following the authorities unwillingness to grant permits for the building of a school on Taipa Island, violence broke out between local people and the Macau Police. This escalated into demonstrations outside the Palácio do Governo, the seat of government, in support of the Taipa residents, shouting slogans and reading aloud from the Little Red Book.

Finally, at 1 pm on 3 December, Red Guards began to riot, denouncing the Portuguese authorities for "fascist atrocities". Afterwards, the Chinese in Macau adopted a "Three No's" approach as a means to continue their struggle with the Government — no taxes, no service, no selling to the Portuguese, almost leading to the collapse of the Portuguese administration.

On 29 January 1967, the Portuguese Governor, José Manuel de Sousa e Faro Nobre de Carvalho, signed a statement of apology at the Chinese Chamber of Commerce, under a portrait of Mao Zedong, with Ho, as the Chamber's president, presiding.

Ho's involvement and commitment to resolve the crisis caused by the riot was crucial because at that time he was the only one who could contact directly and simultaneously with the Portuguese administration with Chinese officials in Guangzhou and Beijing, as he was the Chinese representative in the Legislative Council. In addition, Ho later became a member of the Standing Committee of the National People's Congress.

With China's diplomatic victory in Macau, Ho was the Chinese representative in a proposed meeting with Sir Jack Cater on the settlement of the 1967 riot in Hong Kong. The talk did not materialize as then-Governor David Trench took a hardline position against leftist aggressors.

Internationally, Ho came to be regarded as Beijing's "unofficial representative" in Macau. This role was crucial to the survival of the Portuguese administration and Macau during the Cold War, the Cultural Revolution and later, the rapid and sudden process of decolonisation by Portugal carried out following Carnation Revolution in 1974. In an interview with the Far Eastern Economic Review that year, Ho remarked that "the Chinese and Portuguese people are living in harmony in Macao whereas the Portuguese and Africans are constantly in political and armed conflict."

In 1975, Lisbon offered to return Macau to Beijing, but the offer was refused, with the Chinese telling the Portuguese that this could only happen when "the time and history were right". Instead, an Organic Statute was adopted in 1976, redefining Macau as "a Chinese territory under Portuguese administration".

After constant negotiations leading to the Joint Declaration on the Question of Macau in 1987, administration of Macau was finally transferred to the People's Republic of China on 20 December 1999.

== Death and legacy ==
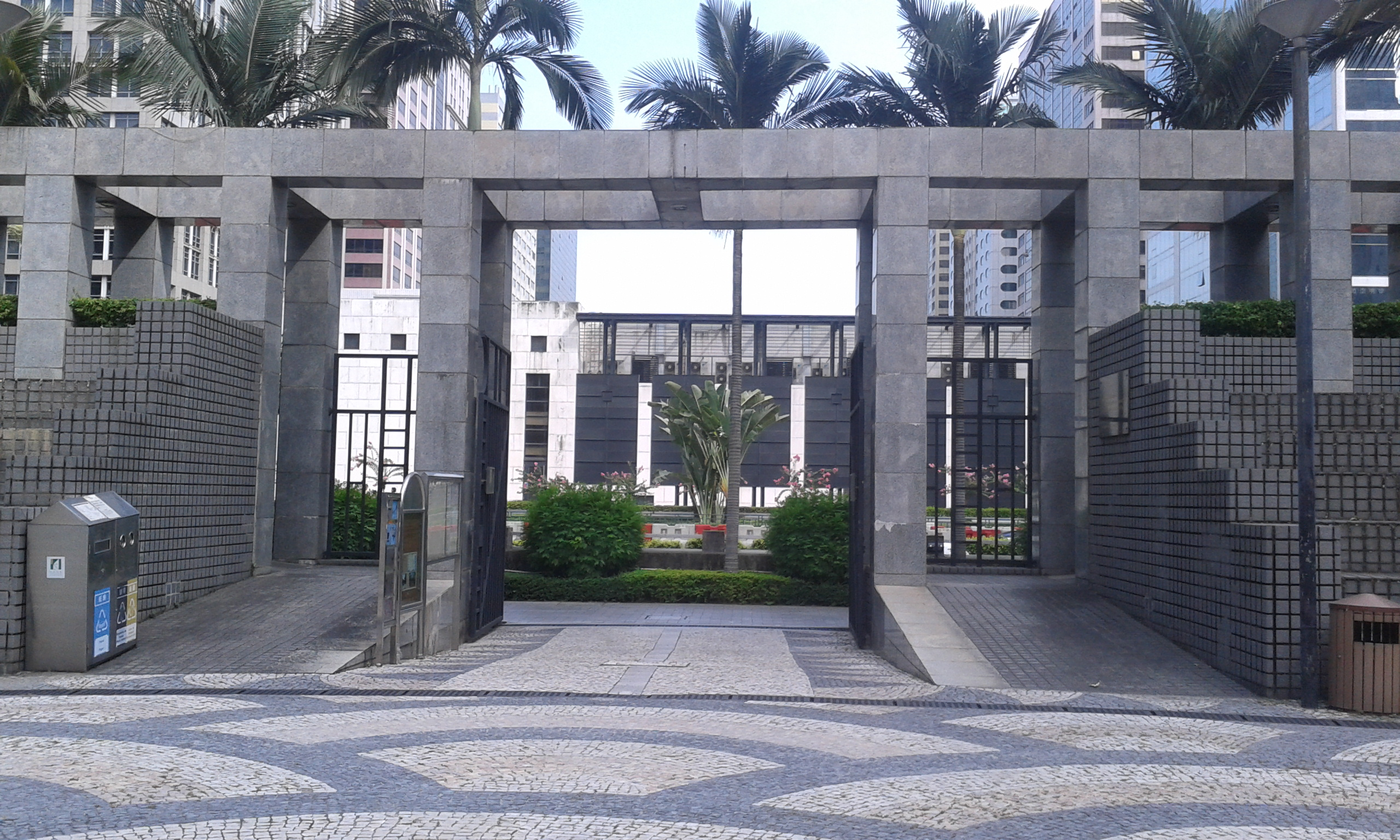
Jardim Comendador Ho Yin, Macau

Ho Yin died on 6 December 1983 at Queen Elizabeth Hospital in Hong Kong of lung cancer.

In Macau, there is a street, Avenida Comendador Ho Yin, named in his honour. There is also a park, known as Jardim Comendador Ho Yin. The University of Macau is also the location of the Ho Yin Convention Centre.

An asteroid discovered by the Purple Mountain Observatory in Nanjing in 1978 was named "5045 Hoyin (1978 UL2)" in his honour in 2006.
