= Anabela Ritchie =

Macau politician (born 1949)

Chinese name
- Traditional Chinese: 林綺濤
- Simplified Chinese: 林绮涛
Transcriptions
Standard Mandarin
- Hanyu Pinyin: Lín Qǐtāo
Yue: Cantonese
- Jyutping: lam4 ji2 tou4

Portuguese name
- Portuguese: Anabela Fátima Xavier Sales Ritchie

Anabela Fátima Xavier Sales Ritchie (Chinese: 林綺濤; born May 25, 1949) is a politician from Macau. She served as president of the Legislative Assembly of Macau, the first woman to hold the position.

Ritchie was born in Macau to a family with both Chinese and Portuguese ancestry; both of her grandmothers were full-blooded Chinese. Her parents, both Macanese, were civil servants.

She gained a master's degree in Germanic philology from the University of Lisbon in 1971, following it with a diploma in pedagogic sciences from the same institution. She taught in Lisbon from 1971 until 1974 before returning to Macau, where she continued teaching from 1975 until 1986. In that year she was appointed to a seat on the Legislative Assembly, of which she served as vice-president. In 1992 Carlos Augusto Corrêa Paes D'Assumpção, then serving as president of the Assembly, died suddenly, and Ritchie was elected to succeed him. She served in the post until the handover of Macau to China in 1999, when she was required to relinquish the position because she opted to keep her Portuguese nationality.

She was succeeded by Susana Chou as president, but remained a member of the Assembly until 2001, serving six terms in total. During her career in the Assembly, Ritchie was often accused of being too pro-Chinese in her outlook.

Since the end of her political career she has remained involved in local affairs, acting as a member of the University Council of the University of Macau a member of the Curators Council of the Macau Foundation, a member of the Consultative Commission for Women's Affairs and a member of the Judiciary Magistrates Council. She is a supporter of the Macau Basic Law, passed while she was a member of the Assembly. Ritchie is married to prominent Macanese doctor Alfredo Maria Sales Ritchie and have two children. Amongst them, Andre Duarte Xavier Sales Ritchie gained notoriety during his spell in charge of the high-profile Macau Light Rapid Transit project.
