= Carlos d'Assumpção =

President of the Legislative Assembly of Macau
- In office 31 March 1976 – 20 April 1992
- Succeeded by: Anabela Ritchie

Personal details
- Born: January 3, 1929 Macau
- Died: April 20, 1992 (aged 63) Hong Kong
- Occupation: Lawyer, jurist, politician, and Macanese leader

Carlos Augusto Corrêa Paes d'Assumpção GCC • ComIH (1 March 1929 – 20 April 1992) was a lawyer, jurist, politician and Macanese leader in Macau. He was the president of the Coimbra Academic Association (1951–1952), Prosecutor of Corporative Chamber (1969–1974), co-founder of the Association for the Defense of Macau Interests (1974), president of the Legislative Assembly of Macau (1976–1992) and member of the Drafting Committee for the Macau Basic Law (1988–1992).

== Early life ==
D'Assumpção was born on 1 March 1929 in Macau, then a Portuguese overseas province, to a traditional and wealthy Macanese family. He completed his secondary studies at the Liceu de Macau, and studied law at the University of Coimbra between 1946 and 1951.

D'Assumpção died on 20 April 1992 at the age of 63.

== Family ==
His father was João Corrêa Paes d'Assumpção Jr. and his mother was Epifânia Assam. On his paternal side, he was a descendant of João Corrêa Paes d'Assumpção (1825–1895). He was the cousin of Delfino José Rodrigues Ribeiro.

On 9 December 1959, d'Assumpção married with Maria de Lourdes Lopes da Silva (born 3 December 1932), with whom he had children:

- Carlos Augusto Lopes da Silva Corrêa Paes d'Assumpção (born 30 December 1960)
- Maria de Lourdes Corrêa Paes d'Assumpção (born 16 September 1963)
- João Manuel Corrêa Paes d'Assumpção (born 7 October 1967)

== Decorations ==
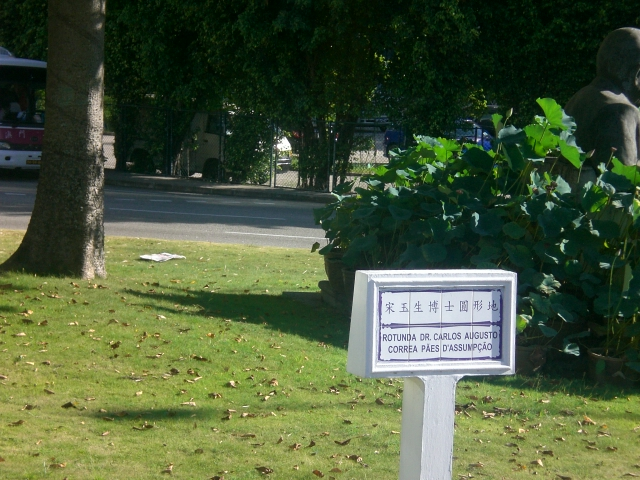
Rotunda Dr. Carlos Augusto Correa Pães d'Assumpção, in Taipa.

On 11 April 1971, d'Assumpção was awarded the Order of Prince Henry. He was posthumously awarded the Grand Cross of Ordem Militar de Cristo on 10 June 1992.

The Dr. Carlos d'Assumpção Park is named after him.
