= Cheung Mei-hung =

Hong Kong politician

Chris Cheung Mei-hung
- 張美雄

Member of the Sai Kung District Council
- Incumbent
- Assumed office 1 January 2024
- Constituency: District Committee
- In office 1 January 2016 – 31 December 2023
- Preceded by: New Constituency
- Succeeded by: Constituency Abolished
- Constituency: Wan Po South

Personal details
- Born: 1988 (age 37–38)
- Party: HK Round Table on People's Livelihood (since 2022)
- Other political affiliations: Professional Power (until 2022)
- Education: Ching Chung Secondary School; Mong Man Wai College; Hang Seng University of Hong Kong; Hong Kong Polytechnic University
- Occupation: District councilor

Chris Chueng Mei-heung (Chinese: 張美雄, born 1988) is a Hong Kong politician who is a current member of the Sai Kung District Council since 2016. He was one of the three founding members of HK Round Table on People's Livelihood, a centrist think tank and political party which was founded on 1 January 2022.

== Career ==
He ran in the 2015 District Council election, representing Wan Po South and won with 2,188 votes, defeating DAB candidate Wu Cheuk-him. He ran for reelection in the 2019 District Council election and won with 3,577 votes.

He withdrew from Professional Power to found HK Round Table on People's Livelihood on 1 January 2022 alongside Chan Kai-wai and Cheung Chin-pang.

In the 2023 District Council elections he switched his constituency to the indirectly elected District Committee constituency, where he won and was elected for a third term.

On October 27, 2025, the fourth day of the nomination period for the 2025 Legislative Council election, Cheung Mei-hung announced on social media that he would participate in the elections as an independent candidate. Cheung was unsuccessful and received 18,681 votes.
