= Chan Kai-wai =

Hong Kong politician

Chan Kai-wai MH
- 陳繼偉

Member of the Sai Kung District Council
- Incumbent
- Assumed office 1 January 2024
- Constituency: District Committee
- In office 1 January 2008 – 31 December 2019
- Preceded by: New Constituency
- Succeeded by: Brandon Kenneth Yip
- Constituency: Wai King

HK Round Table on People's Livelihood Chairman
- Incumbent
- Assumed office 1 January 2022
- Preceded by: New Party

Personal details
- Born: 1966 (age 59–60) British Hong Kong
- Party: HK Round Table on People's Livelihood (Since 2022）
- Other political affiliations: Professional Power (2012–2022)

Chan Kai Wai MH (Chinese: 陳繼偉, born 1966) is a Hong Kong Politician and current chairman of HK Round Table on People's Livelihood, a centrist think tank and political party in Hong Kong. He is a current member of the Sai Kung District Council, representing the District Committee constituency.

== Career ==
In the 2007 District Council elections, Chan ran as an independent for Wai King, where he was elected at 2,025 votes.

He ran for reelection in the 2011 District Council elections, where Chan was automatically elected. In 2012, Chan joined Professional Power, a centrist-to-Pro-Beijing political party.

In the 2015 District Council elections, Chan was reelected with 3,014 votes.

In 2017, Chan became a member of the election committee, where he nominated Carrie Lam as Chief Executive but claimed to have supported Woo Kwok-hing.

In the 2019 District Council elections Chan was unsuccessful in reelection, losing to Pan-Democrat Brandon Kenneth Yip due to the 2019 protests.

On 1 January 2022, Chan alongside Cheung Mei-hung and Cheung Chin-pang split from Professional Power to found HK Round Table on People's Livelihood, a centrist think tank and political party.

== See also ==
- HK Round Table on People's Livelihood
- Professional Power
- Centrism in Hong Kong
