= HK Round Table on People's Livelihood =

HK Round Table on People's Livelihood 民生圓桌
- Chairperson: Chan Kai-wai
- Founded: 1 January 2022
- Split from: Professional Power
- Ideology: Centrism (HK)
- Colours: Green and White
- Legislative Council: 0 / 90
- District Council: 3 / 470

Website
- 民生圓桌Facebook專頁

HK Round Table on People's Livelihood (Chinese: 民生圓桌) is a Hong Kong centrist think tank established on 1 January 2022. It does not consider itself a political party. Chan Kai-wai is the current chairman.

== History ==
On 1 January 2022, Sai Kung District Council members Cheung Mei-hung, Cheung Chin-pang and former council member Chan Kai-wai left Professional Power to establish HK Round Table on People's Livelihood. A think tank composed of local experts from different professions and fields in society, its aim is to advise the government on various livelihood issues and proposing improvement plans. It currently has three members in the District Council, all of whom are part of the Sai Kung District Council.

== Members represented ==
District Council	Constiteuncy	Members
Sai Kung District Council	District Committee	Chan Kai-wai
Sai Kung District Council	District Committee	Cheung Mei-hung
Sai Kung District Council	District Committee	Cheung Chin-pang

== See also ==
- Professional Power
- Third Side
- Centrism in Hong Kong
