= Ben Chung =

Hong Kong politician

- 鍾錦麟
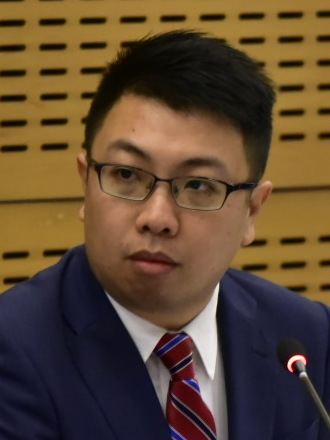
- Chung in 2020

Chairman of the Sai Kung District Council
- In office 2020–2021

Sai Kung District Councillor for Yan Ying
- In office 2012–2021

Personal details
- Born: 19 November 1988 (age 37)
- Party: Neo Democrats; Democratic (until 2012)
- Education: Lingnan University

Ben Chung Kam-lun (Chinese: 鍾錦麟. Born 19 November 1988) is a Hong Kong politician. He is the former member and the former chairperson of the Sai Kung District Council for Yan Ying and convenor of Neo Democrats.

== Biography ==
Chung graduated from the Lingnan University in Cultural Studies. He has been active in politics since he was 12 when he volunteered for Sai Kung District Councilor Gary Fan. He was also the chairman of the Youth Conference 2006 of the Hong Kong Secondary Students Union. He joined the Democratic Party but left with Fan over the party's deal with the Beijing authorities in the 2012 constitutional reform proposal and co-founded Neo Democrats with other Democrat defectors.

He first contested in the 2011 District Council election in Yan Ying. He won the seat with 2,221 votes and became the youngest winner in that election. He was re-elected in 2015. In the 2016 Legislative Council election, he ran on Gary Fan's nine-man ticket in the New Territories East. The ticket received more than 31,000 votes but failed to get Fan re-elected.

On 6 January 2021, Chung was among 55 members of the pro-democratic camp who were arrested under the national security law, specifically its provision regarding subversion. The group stood accused of organising and participating in unofficial primary elections held by the camp in July 2020. He then faced charges and remanded in custody, and will be accomplice witnesses for the prosecution in the trial.

Political offices
Preceded by Ng Ping-yiu	Member of Sai Kung District Council; Representative for Yan Ying; 2012–2021	Vacant
Preceded by George Ng	Chairman of Sai Kung District Council; 2020–2021	Succeeded by Francis Chau
