= Wan Hang (constituency) =

Constituency of the Sai Kung District Council of Hong Kong

- Elected constituency for the Sai Kung District Council
- Boundary of Wan Hang in Sai Kung District
- District: Sai Kung
- Legislative Council constituency: New Territories South East
- Population: 14,254 (2019)
- Electorate: 7,489 (2019)

Current constituency
- Created: 1999
- Number of members: One
- Member: Vacant

Wan Hang (Chinese: 運亨) is one of the 29 constituencies of the Sai Kung District Council in Hong Kong. The seat elects one member of the council every four years. The boundary of the constituency is loosely based on the area of Metro City.

== Councillors represented ==
Election	Member	Party
1999	Gary Fan Kwok-wai	Democratic
2003	Gary Fan Kwok-wai	Democratic
2007	Gary Fan Kwok-wai	Democratic→Neo Democrats
2011	Gary Fan Kwok-wai	Neo Democrats
2015	Gary Fan Kwok-wai	Neo Democrats
2019	Gary Fan Kwok-wai→Vacant (Note: Resigned on 15 March 2021 after being arrested under national security law.)	Neo Democrats

== Election results ==
=== 2010s ===
Sai Kung District Council Election, 2019: Wan Hang
Party	Candidate	Votes	%	±%
Neo Democrats	Gary Fan Kwok-wai	3,755	65.16	+9.06
Nonpartisan	Yeung Chung	1,859	32.26	
Independent	Lau Chi-shing	106	1.84	
Nonpartisan	Tai Cheuk-yin	43	0.75	
Majority		1,896	32.90	
Turnout		5,803	77.50	
Neo Democrats hold		Swing		

Sai Kung District Council Election, 2015: Wan Hang
Party	Candidate	Votes	%	±%
Neo Democrats	Gary Fan Kwok-wai	3,104	56.1	–18.8
Nonpartisan	Sun Wai-kei	2,313	41.8	
Independent	Lai Tze-wah	117	2.1	
Majority		791	14.3	–35.5
Turnout		5,579	55.1	
Neo Democrats hold		Swing		

Sai Kung District Council Election, 2011: Wan Hang
Party	Candidate	Votes	%	±%
Neo Democrats	Gary Fan Kwok-wai	3,014	74.90	+2.69
DAB	Hau Lai-ying	1,010	25.10	−2.69
Majority		2,004	49.8	+5.38
Neo Democrats hold		Swing		

=== 2000s ===
Sai Kung District Council Election, 2007: Wan Hang
Party	Candidate	Votes	%	±%
Democratic	Gary Fan Kwok-wai	2,567	72.21	−11.35
DAB	Lin Chor-keung	988	27.79	+11.35
Majority		1,579	44.42	−22.7
Democratic hold		Swing		

Sai Kung District Council Election, 2003: Wan Hang
Party	Candidate	Votes	%	±%
Democratic	Gary Fan Kwok-wai	3,070	83.56	+42.62
DAB	Chan Wing-hung	604	16.44	−14.54
Majority		2,464	67.12	+57.16
Democratic hold		Swing	+28.58	

=== 1990s ===
Sai Kung District Council Election, 1999: Wan Hang
Party	Candidate	Votes	%	±%
Democratic	Gary Fan Kwok-wai	924	40.94	
DAB	Leung Chi-kwong	679	30.98	
Independent	Liu Kwong-sang	654	28.98	
Majority		245	9.96	
Democratic win (new seat)				
