= Wan Po North (constituency) =

Constituency of the Sai Kung District Council of Hong Kong

- Elected constituency for the Sai Kung District Council
- Boundary of Wan Po North in Sai Kung District
- District: Sai Kung
- Legislative Council constituency: New Territories South East
- Population: 18,855 (2019)
- Electorate: 8,742 (2019)

Current constituency
- Created: 2015
- Number of members: One
- Member: Christine Fong (Independent)
- Created from: Wan Po

Wan Po North
- Traditional Chinese: 環保北
- Simplified Chinese: 环保北
Transcriptions
Standard Mandarin
- Hanyu Pinyin: Huánbǎo Běi
Yue: Cantonese
- Jyutping: waan4 bou2 bak1

Wan Po North was one of the 29 constituencies in the Sai Kung District before the 2023 District Council Overhaul.

Wan Po North constituency is loosely based on Oscar By The Sea, The Beaumount and part of Lohas Park in Tseung Kwan O with estimated population of 18,855.

Christine Fong was the only Councilor represented in Wan Po North.

== Councillors represented ==
Election	Member	Party
2015	Christine Fong Kwok-shan	Independent

== Election results ==
=== 2010s ===
Sai Kung District Council Election, 2019: Wan Po North
Party	Candidate	Votes	%	±%
Independent	Christine Fong Kwok-shan	2,998	44.29	−35.71
Nonpartisan	Ho Tsz-chung	2,828	41.78	
Community Alliance	Cyrus Chan Chin-chun	943	13.93	
Majority		170	2.51	
Turnout		6,788	77.66	
Independent hold		Swing		

Sai Kung District Council Election, 2015: Wan Po North
Party	Candidate	Votes	%	±%
Independent	Christine Fong Kwok-shan	2,667	80.0	
Liberal	Chui Ting-pong	665	20.0	
Majority		2,002	60.0	
Turnout		3,368	55.3	
Independent win (new seat)				
