= Tseung Kwan O Shining =

Tseung Kwan O Shining 將向天晴
- Leaders: Yu Tsun-ning; Yip Brandon-Kenneth
- Founded: July 2019
- Ideology: Liberalism (HK)
- Regional affiliation: Pro-democracy camp
- Colours: Yellow; White; Purple
- Legislative Council: 0 / 90
- Sai Kung District Council: 0 / 32

Website
- Facebook page

Tseung Kwan O Shining (Chinese: 將向天晴) is a local political group based in Sai Kung and Tseung Kwan O founded in 2019. In a historic pro-democracy landslide in 2019 District Council election, the group won two seats in the Sai Kung District Council.

== History ==
Tseung Kwan O Shining was formed in 2019 ahead the 2019 District Council election by a group of Sai Kung and Tseung Kwan O residents, aiming at running against the uncontested pro-Beijing candidates, improving community livelihood and supervising the governmental institutes. The group filled two candidates in the 2019 election, with Yu Tsun-ning contesting in Hang Hau West and Brandon Kenneth Yip running in Wai King. Both candidates won in their respective constituencies.

== Performance in elections ==
=== Sai Kung District Council elections ===
Election	Number of popular votes	% of popular votes	Total elected seats	+/−
2019	3,089	1.55	2 / 29	2▲
