= Yan Ying (constituency) =

Constituency of the Sai Kung District Council of Hong Kong

- Elected constituency for the Sai Kung District Council
- Boundary of Yan Ying in Sai Kung District
- District: Sai Kung
- Legislative Council constituency: New Territories South East
- Population: 18,246 (2019)
- Electorate: 12,017 (2019)

Current constituency
- Created: 1994
- Number of members: One
- Member: Vacant

Yan Ying is one of the 29 constituencies in the Sai Kung District.

The constituency returns one district councillor to the Sai Kung District Council, with an election every four years.

Yan Ying constituency is loosely based on Yan Ming Court, Metro City 2 and part of Po Lam Estate in Tseung Kwan O with estimated population of 18,246.

== Councillors represented ==
| Election | Member | Party |
|---|---|---|
| 1994 | Lau Wing-chuen | Independent |
| 1999 | Ng Ping-yiu | Independent→Progressive Alliance |
| 2003 | Ng Ping-yiu | Progressive Alliance→DAB |
| 2007 | Ng Ping-yiu | DAB |
| 2011 | Ben Chung Kam-lun | Neo Democrats |
| 2015 | Ben Chung Kam-lun | Neo Democrats |
| 2019 | Ben Chung Kam-lun→Vacant (Note: Resigned on 10 May 2021 after being arrested under national security law.) | Neo Democrats |

== Election results ==
=== 2010s ===
Sai Kung District Council Election, 2019: Yan Ying
| Party | Candidate | Votes | % | ±% |
|---|---|---|---|---|
| Neo Democrats | Ben Chung Kam-lun | 5,629 | 63.81 | +4.32 |
| Nonpartisan | Lee Kwok-pong | 3,193 | 36.19 | |
| Majority | | 2,436 | 27.62 | |
| Turnout | | 8,868 | 73.82 | |
| Neo Democrats hold | | Swing | | |

Sai Kung District Council Election, 2015: Yan Ying
| Party | Candidate | Votes | % | ±% |
|---|---|---|---|---|
| Neo Democrats | Ben Chung Kam-lun | 3,283 | 59.49 | +6.80 |
| NPP (Civil Force) | Michael Liu Tsz-chung | 1,229 | 22.27 | |
| Liberal | Harris Yeung Ho-chuen | 1,007 | 18.25 | |
| Majority | | 2,054 | 37.22 | |
| Turnout | | 5,519 | 49.78 | +10.14 |
| Neo Democrats hold | | Swing | | |

Sai Kung District Council Election, 2011: Yan Ying
| Party | Candidate | Votes | % | ±% |
|---|---|---|---|---|
| Neo Democrats | Ben Chung Kam-lun | 2,221 | 52.69 | |
| Nonpartisan | Wong Man-kit | 1,728 | 41.00 | |
| Independent | Cheung Man-kit | 266 | 6.31 | |
| Majority | | 493 | 11.69 | |
| Turnout | | 4,215 | 39.64 | |
| Neo Democrats gain from DAB | | Swing | | |

=== 2000s ===
Sai Kung District Council Election, 2007: Yan Ying
| Party | Candidate | Votes | % | ±% |
|---|---|---|---|---|
| DAB | Ng Ping-yiu | 1,881 | 60.6 | +6.3 |
| LSD | Foo Wai-lok | 1,224 | 39.4 | |
| DAB hold | | Swing | | |

Sai Kung District Council Election, 2003: Yan Ying
| Party | Candidate | Votes | % | ±% |
|---|---|---|---|---|
| HKPA | Ng Ping-yiu | 2,345 | 54.3 | +15.3 |
| DAB | Ben Cheung Man-kit | 1,322 | 30.6 | +1.7 |
| Nonpartisan | Lee Siu-fai | 650 | 15.1 | |
| HKPA hold | | Swing | | |

=== 1990s ===
Sai Kung District Council Election, 1999: Yan Ying
| Party | Candidate | Votes | % | ±% |
|---|---|---|---|---|
| Independent | Ng Ping-yiu | 891 | 39.0 | |
| Nonpartisan | Wong Wah-keung | 754 | 33.0 | |
| DAB | Wong Yiu-wing | 638 | 27.9 | |
| Independent gain from Independent | | Swing | | |

Sai Kung District Council Election, 1994: Yan Ying
| Party | Candidate | Votes | % | ±% |
|---|---|---|---|---|
| Independent | Lau Wing-chuen | 1,532 | 65.4 | |
| DAB | Wong Kat-leung | 810 | 34.6 | |
| Independent win (new seat) | | | | |
