= 2012 Hong Kong legislative election in New Territories East =

- 9 September 2012

All 9 New Territories East seats to the Legislative Council
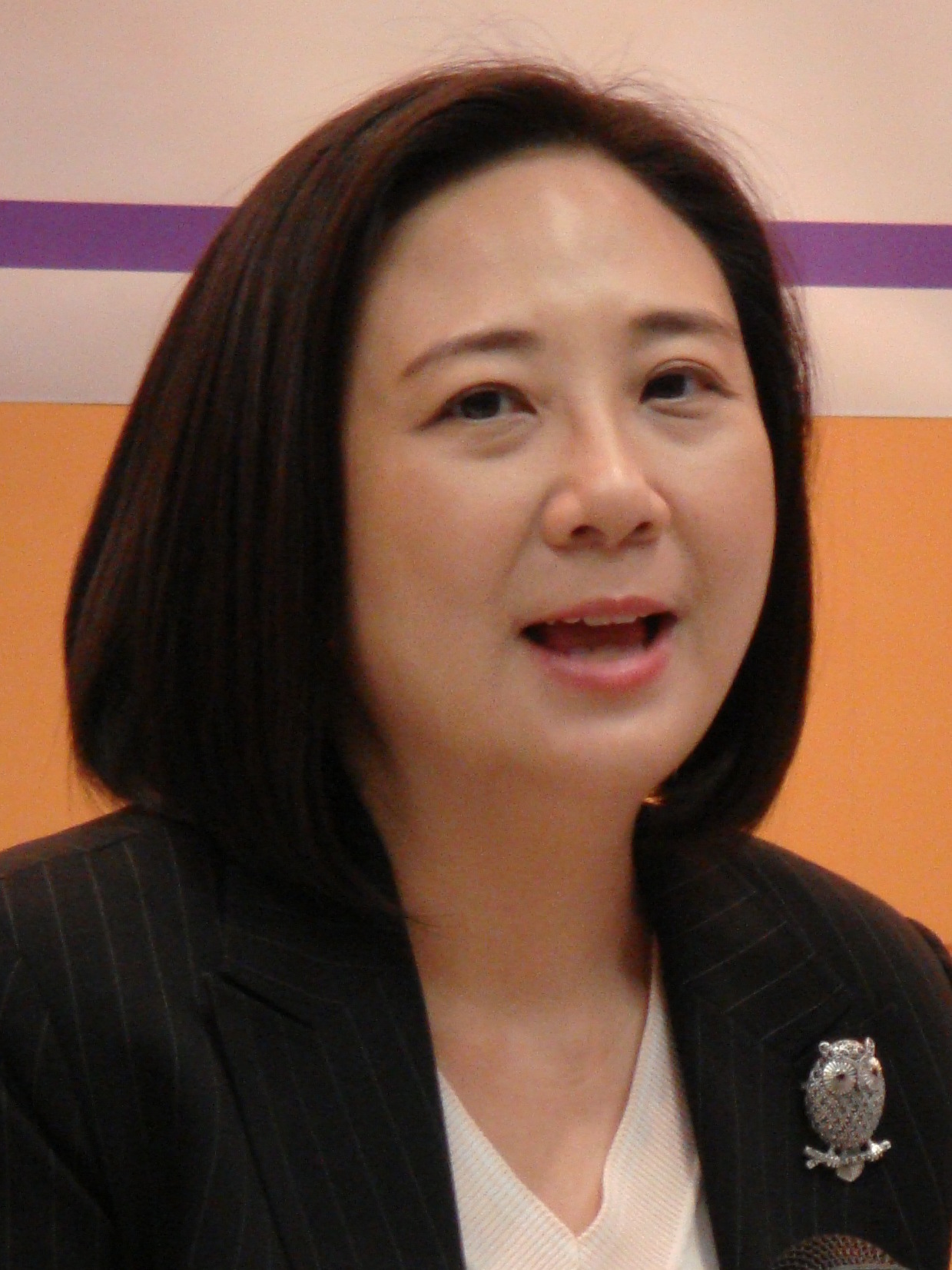

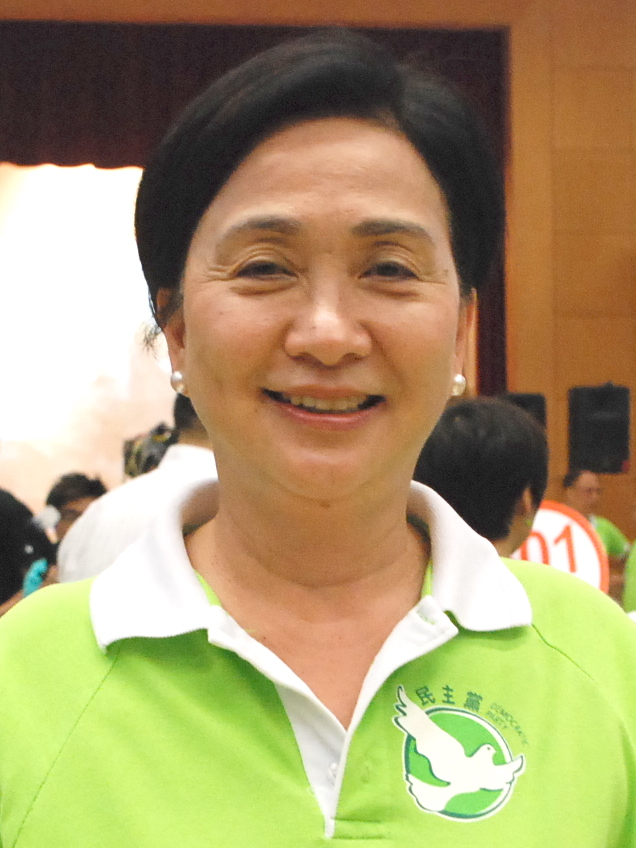

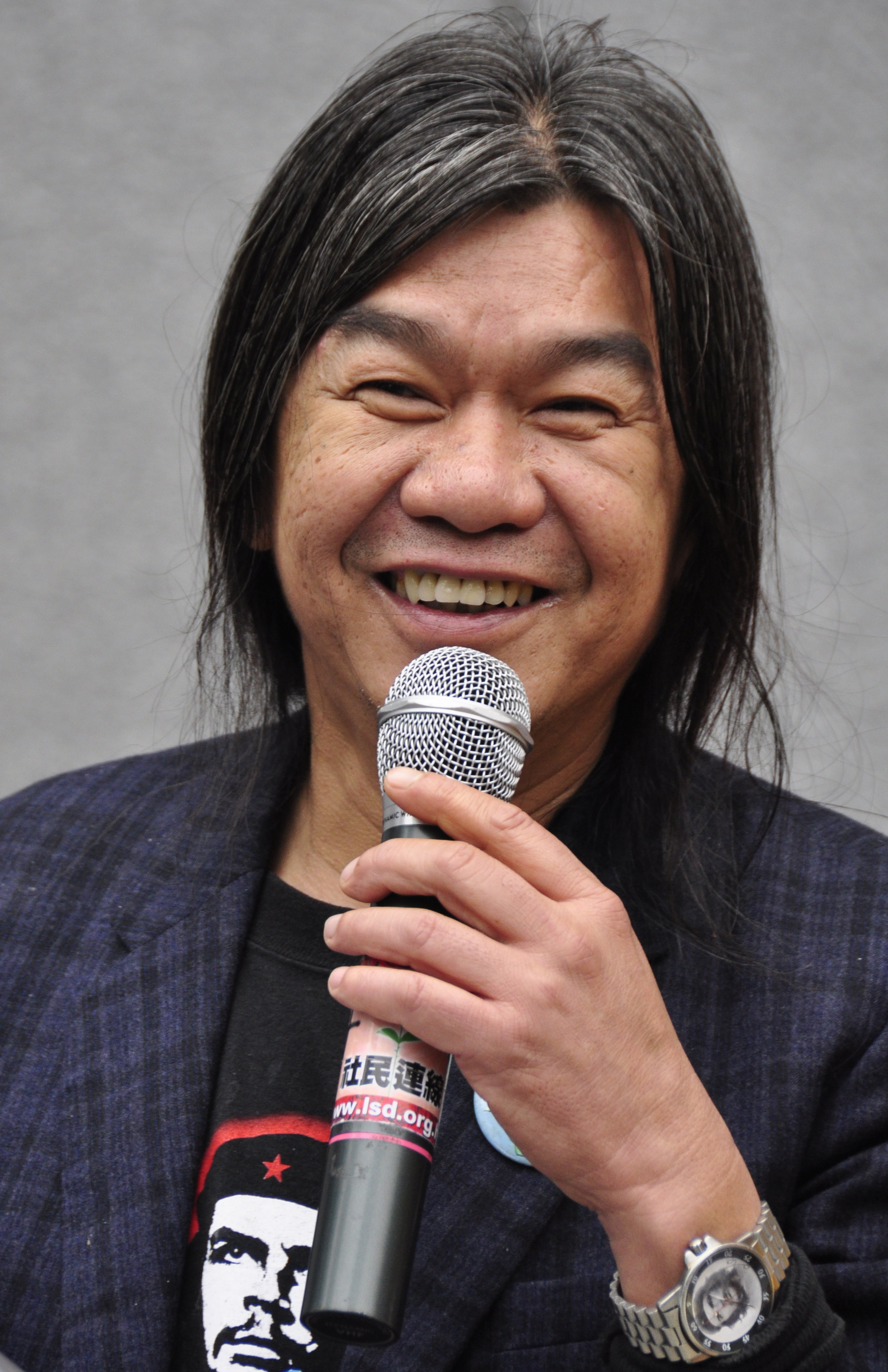

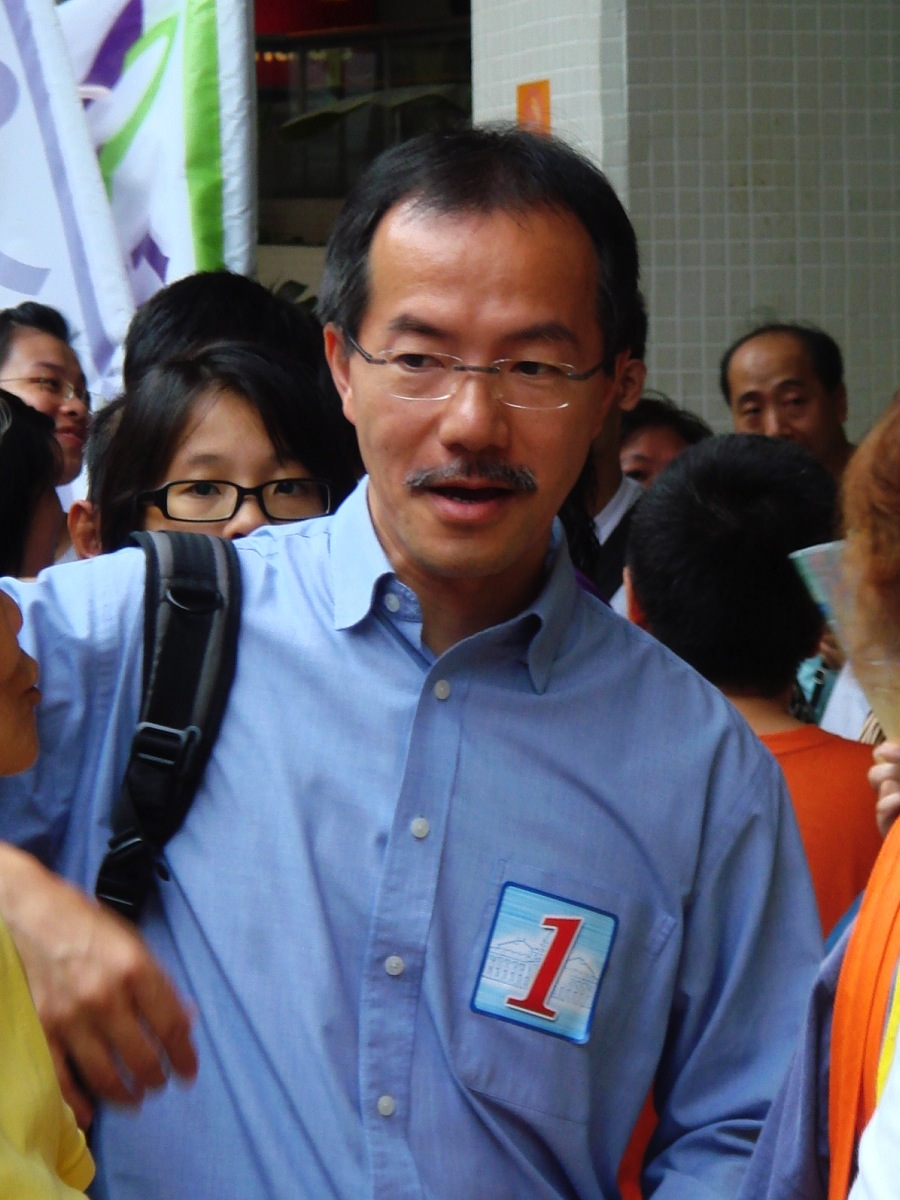

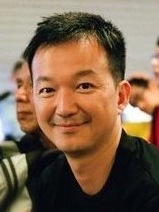

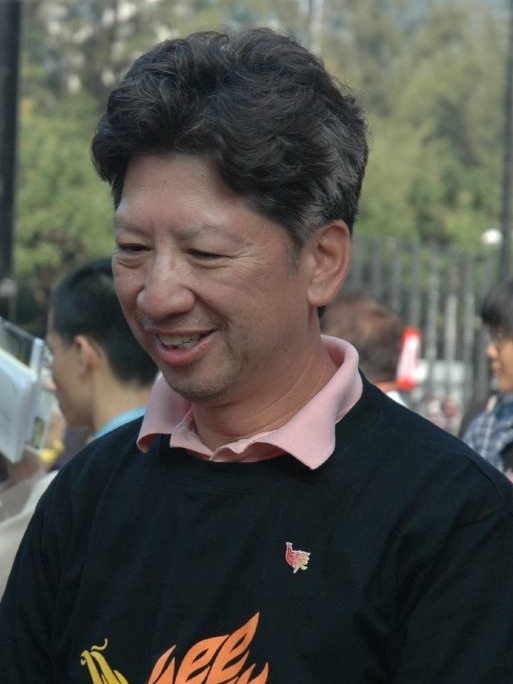

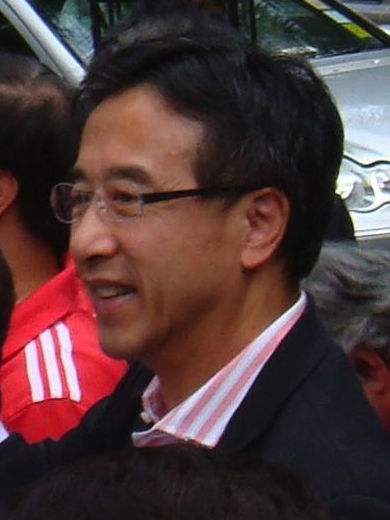

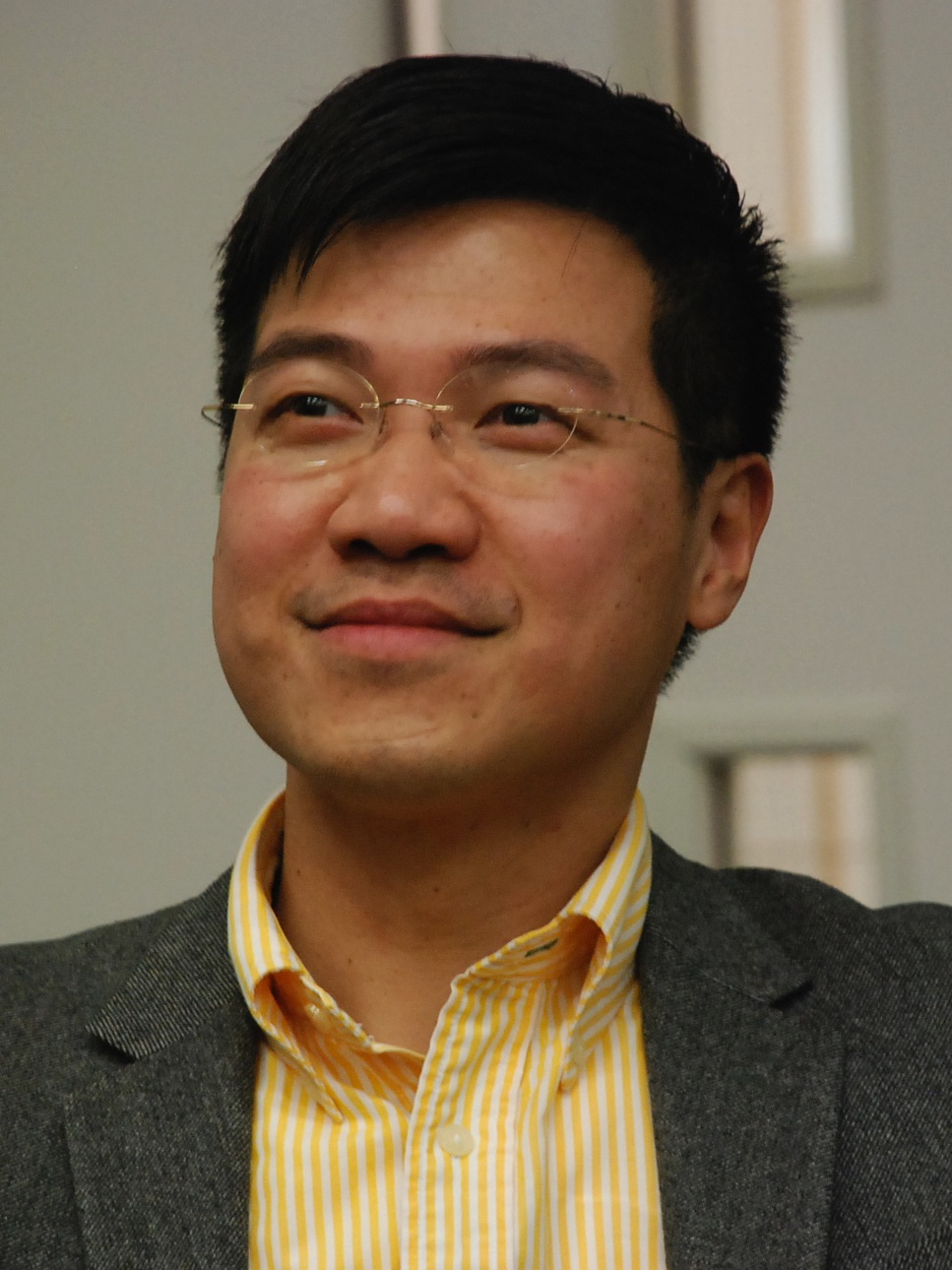
	First party	Second party	Third party
Leader	Elizabeth Quat & Gary Chan	Emily Lau, Wong Sing-chi & Richard Tsoi	Leung Kwok-hung
Party	DAB	Democratic	LSD
Alliance	Pro-Beijing	Pan-democracy	Pan-democracy
Last election	2 seats, 28.4%	2 seats, 23.8%	1 seat, 12.4%
Seats before	2	2	1
Seats won	2	1	1
Seat change	Steady	▼1	Steady
Popular vote	87,116	68,185	48,295
Percentage	18.2%	14.7%	10.4%
Swing	▼10.2%	▼9.1%	▼2.0%
	Fourth party	Fifth party	Sixth party
Leader	Fernando Cheung	Ray Chan	Ronny Tong
Party	Labour	People Power	Civic
Alliance	Pan-democracy	Pan-democracy	Pan-democracy
Last election	new	new	1 seat, 11.1%
Seats before	0	0	1
Seats won	1	1	1
Seat change	▲1	▲1	Steady
Popular vote	40,967	38,042	32,753
Percentage	9.5%	8.2%	7.1%
Swing	N/A	N/A	▼4.0%
	Seventh party	Eighth party
Leader	James Tien	Gary Fan
Party	Liberal	Neo Democrats
Alliance	Pro-Beijing	Pan-democracy
Last election	0 seat, 8.0%	new
Seats before	0	0
Seats won	1	1
Seat change	▲1	▲1
Popular vote	31,016	31,016
Percentage	6.7%	6.2%
Swing	▼1.3%	N/A
- Party with most votes in each District Council Constituency.

These are the New Territories East results of the 2012 Hong Kong legislative election. The election was held on 9 September 2012 and all 9 seats in New Territories East where consisted of North District, Tai Po District, Sai Kung District and Sha Tin District were contested. The pro-democracy camp strategically succeeded in holding six seats with only 56.9% of the votes. Raymond Chan Chi-chuen of the People Power and Gary Fan of Neo Democrats were elected for the first time. Former Civic Party legislator Fernando Cheung also returned to the LegCo representing the newly formed Labour Party.

== Overall results ==
Before election:

↓
5	2
Pan-democracy	Pro-Beijing

Change in composition:

↓
6	3
Pan-democracy	Pro-Beijing

Party	Seats	Seats change	Contesting list(s)	Votes	%	% change
Democratic	1	−1	3	68,185	14.7	−9.1
LSD	1	0	1	48,295	10.4	−2.0
Labour	1	+1	1	40,967	9.5	N/A
People Power	1	0	1	38,042	8.2	N/A
Civic	1	0	1	72,185	7.1	−4.0
Neo Democrats	1	+1	1	28,621	6.2	N/A
Independent	0	0	2	8,906	1.9	N/A
Pro-democracy camp	6	+1	10	264,452	56.9	+0.3
DAB	2	0	2	87,116	18.2	−10.2
Liberal	1	+1	1	31,016	6.7	−1.3
FTU	0	0	1	24,458	5.3	N/A
Civil Force	0	0	1	23,988	5.2	−0.5
Economic Synergy	0	0	1	5,717	1.2	N/A
Independent	0	0	1	24,594	5.3	N/A
Pro-Beijing camp	3	+1	7	196,889	42.4	−0.8
Independent	0	0	2	3,404	0.7	N/A
Turnout:				464,745	53.4	

== Candidates list ==
Legislative Election 2012: New Territories East
List	Candidates	Votes	Of total (%)	± from prev.
LSD	Leung Kwok-hung	48,295	10.39	−2.01
DAB	Elizabeth Quat Chong Yuen-tung, Li Sai-wing, Philip Li Ka-leung, Tung Kin-lei, Ki Lai-mei, Wong Ping-fan	46,139	9.93	N/A
DAB	Chan Hak-kan Lau Kwok-fan, Wong Pik-kiu, Larm Wai-leung, Clement Woo Kin-man, Yiu Ming	40,977	8.82	−19.58
Labour	Cheung Chiu-hung Kwok Wing-kin	39,650	8.53	N/A
People Power (Frontier)	Raymond Chan Chi-chuen Erica Yuen Mi-ming	38,042	8.19	N/A
Democratic	Emily Lau Wai-hing Ricky Or Yiu-lam, Ricky Lam Siu-ching, Frankie Lam Wing-yin	37,039	7.97	−1.23
Civic	Ronny Tong Ka-wah Alvin Yeung Nhok-kiu	32,753	7.05	−4.05
Liberal	James Tien Pei-chun Selina Chow Liang Shuk-yee, Leung Chi-wai, Liu Kwok-wah	31,016	6.67	−1.33
Neo Democrats	Gary Fan Kwok-wai Yam Kai-bong, Shirley Ho Suk-ping, Leung Li, Kwan Wing-yip, Michael Yung Ming-chau, Frankie Lam Siu-chung	28,621	6.16	N/A
Independent	Christine Fong Kwok-shan	24,594	5.29	N/A
FTU	Ip Wai-ming, Wong Wang-to, Ching Ngon-lai, Kan Siu-kei, Kent Tsang King-chung, Cheung Kwok-wo	24,458	5.26	N/A
Civil Force (New Forum)	Scarlett Pong Oi-lan, Lanny Tam, Law Kwong-keung, Chan Kwok-tim, So Chun-man, Lam Chung-yan, Leung Ka-fai, Chan Man-kuen, Tang Wing-cheong	23,988	5.16	−0.54
Democratic	Wong Sing-chi, Law Sai-yan	21,118	4.54	−7.66
Democratic	Richard Tsoi Yiu-cheong, Au Chun-wah, Mak Yun-pui, Kwong Mei-na	10,028	2.16	N/A
Nonpartisan	Pong Yat-ming	6,031	1.30	N/A
Economic Synergy	Yau Wing-kwong, Tong Po-chun, Chan Cho-leung, Pang Shu-wan, Lau Wai-lun, Shing Kwok-chu, Man Chen-fai, Tang Kwong-wing, Lok Shui-sang	5,717	1.23	N/A
Independent	Raymond Ho Man-kit	2,875	0.62	N/A
Nonpartisan	Chan Kwok-keung	2,327	0.50	N/A
Independent	Angel Leung On-kay	1,077	0.23	N/A
Turnout		464,745	53.37	+9.12

== Results by districts ==
List	Leading Candidates	North	Tai Po	Sai Kung	Sha Tin	Total
LSD	Leung Kwok-hung	11.17	10.62	9.60	10.46	10.39
FTU	Ip Wai-ming	5.87	5.07	5.39	5.02	5.26
Democratic	Emily Lau	4.66	6.37	9.15	9.30	7.97
Independent	Angel Leung	0.27	0.27	0.18	0.23	0.23
Civil Force	Scarlett Pong	1.48	1.74	3.33	9.28	5.16
DAB	Elizabeth Quat	3.78	3.86	12.65	13.41	9.93
People Power	Raymond Chan Chi-chuen	8.82	9.19	7.34	8.01	8.19
Economic Synergy	Yau Wing-kwong	0.83	3.89	0.64	0.61	1.23
DAB	Gary Chan	22.34	17.24	3.08	3.12	8.82
Labour	Fernando Cheung	8.36	9.32	6.46	9.54	8.53
Democratic	Richard Tsoi	0.85	3.38	0.87	2.96	2.16
Neo Democrats	Gary Fan	3.26	8.80	8.41	4.83	6.16
Liberal	James Tien	8.22	6.56	4.80	7.23	6.67
Democratic	Wong Sing-chi	11.70	2.83	2.38	3.66	4.54
Civic	Ronny Tong	4.58	7.20	6.92	8.08	7.05
Independent	Raymond Ho	0.19	0.18	1.81	0.25	0.62
Nonpartisan	Pong Yat-ming	1.41	1.39	1.03	1.38	1.30
Independent	Christine Fong	1.71	1.76	15.60	1.96	5.29
Nonpartisan	Chan Kwok-keung	0.49	0.34	0.36	0.66	0.50

== See also ==
- Legislative Council of Hong Kong
- Hong Kong legislative elections
- 2012 Hong Kong legislative election
