= Hang Hau West (constituency) =

Constituency of the Sai Kung District Council of Hong Kong

- Elected constituency for the Sai Kung District Council
- Boundary of Hang Hau West in Sai Kung District
- District: Sai Kung
- Legislative Council constituency: New Territories South East
- Population: 19,361 (2019)
- Electorate: 7,200 (2019)

Current constituency
- Created: 1982
- Number of members: One
- Member(s): Vacant

Hang Hau West (Chinese: 坑口西) is one of the 29 constituencies in the Sai Kung District.

The constituency returns one district councillor to the Sai Kung District Council, with an election every four years.

Hang Hau West constituency is loosely based on western part of Hang Hau with estimated population of 19,361.

== Councillors represented ==
Election	Member	Party
1982	Wan Shu-pui	Nonpartisan
1985	Shing For-nam	Nonpartisan
1994	Yau Chi-wan	Nonpartisan
199?	Yau Chi-wan	DAB
2007	Yau Yuk-lun	DAB
2019	Yu Tsun-ning→Vacant	TKO Shining

== Election results ==
=== 2010s ===
Sai Kung District Council Election, 2019: Hang Hau West
Party	Candidate	Votes	%	±%
TKO Shining	Yu Tsun-ning	3,089	59.78	
DAB	Yau Ho-lun	2,078	40.22	
Majority		1,011	19.56	
Turnout		5,181	71.97	
TKO Shining gain from DAB		Swing		
