= Synergy of Macao =

Political party in Macau

Association of Synergy of Macao 傳新澳門協會
- Portuguese name: Associação da Sinergia de Macau
- President: Vitor Vai
- Chairman: Ron Lam
- Secretary-General: Che I-kei
- Founded: 5 February 2017
- Registered: 16 March 2017
- Regional affiliation: Centrist camp
- Legislative Assembly: 0 / 33

Website
- www.synergymacao.org

The Association of Synergy of Macao (Chinese: 傳新澳門協會; Portuguese: Associação da Sinergia de Macau), often shortened to Synergy of Macao (傳新澳門; Sinergia de Macau), is a centrist political party in Macau.

== History ==
The formation of Synergy of Macao was announced on 5 February 2017 by Ron Lam U-tou, a former member of Macao Federation of Trade Unions, along with retired senior civil servant Vitor da Rocha Vai, former editor of Macao Daily News Ian Heng-ut, and then-vice-convener of Northern District Community Service Consultative Committee Ho Chong-chun. Lam raised concern over discussion of current issues in the society, which he described as rather subjective and lack of analysis. Building a new platform, Synergy of Macao aimed to monitor the government while solving social illnesses through new pathways, hence achieving a fair, free, and just community. The Association was formally registered on 16 March 2017.

Although claiming no plan nor intention to join the upcoming Legislative Assembly election at the formation, the Association participated in the 2017 legislative election under the brand of "Synergy Power" (Chinese: 傳新力量; Portuguese: Poder da Singeria), highlighting the "third way" between pro-Beijing establishments and pro-democracy opposition. Synergy of Macao focused on transport and housing agenda in their party platform, while advocating political reform – including "one person two votes", of which voters can vote in both geographical and functional constituency seats, and to push for step-by-step universal suffrage of Macanese Chief Executive. Synergy Power eventually ranked sixteenth in the election, failed to win any seats.

The Association ran for the second time in 2021 and won a seat in geographical constituency as votes received surged. Chairman Ron Lam entered the Legislative Assembly as the sole centrist in the parliament.

The party was disqualified from running in the 2025 election, leaving the pro-democracy New Hope party as the only non-establishment list contesting the vote.

== Leadership ==
The leadership (2020–2023) of the Association is as follows:

- President: Vitor da Rocha Vai
- Vice President: Tam Weng-chi
- Chairperson: Ron Lam U-tou
- Vice Chairperson: Ian Heng-ut
- General Secretary: Che I-kei
- Financial Secretary: Vitor da Rocha Vai

== Electoral performance ==
Synergy of Macao participated in two Legislative Assembly elections since its foundation.

Election	Number of popular votes	% of popular votes	GC seats	FC seats	CE seats	Total seats	+/−	Position
2017	7,162	4.15	0	–	–	0 / 33	Steady	16th
2021	8,763	6.64	1	–	–	1 / 33	▲	7th
2025	Disqualified		—N/a	—N/a	—N/a	0 / 33	▼	—N/a

== Elected members ==
- Ron Lam U-tou, 2021–2025
