= 1999 Sai Kung District Council election =

Hong Kong local election

- 28 November 1999

17 (of the 24) seats to Sai Kung District Council 13 seats needed for a majority
- Turnout: 39.8%
	First party	Second party	Third party
Party	DAB	HKPA	Democratic
Last election	0 seat, 12.4%	1 seat, 5.9%	2 seats, 17.0%
Seats before	2	1	2
Seats won	5	3	3
Seat change	▲3	▲2	▲1
Popular vote	6,444	6,197	5,164
Percentage	17.0%	16.4%	13.7%
Swing	▲3.8%	▼10.5%	▼3.3%
- Colours on map indicate winning party for each constituency.

The 1999 Sai Kung District Council election was held on 28 November 1999 to elect all 17 elected members to the 24-member District Council.

== Overall election results ==
Before election:

↓
3	8
Pro-democracy	Pro-Beijing

Change in composition:

↓
4	13
Pro-dem	Pro-Beijing

Sai Kung District Council election result 1999
Party	Seats	Gains	Losses	Net gain/loss	Seats %	Votes %	Votes	+/−
Independent	6	3	1	+2	35.3	47.2	17,835	
DAB	5	3	0	+3	29.4	17.0	6,444	+3.8
HKPA	3	0	0	0	17.6	16.4	6,197	−10.5
Democratic	3	1	0	+2	17.6	13.7	5,164	−3.3
