= Wan Po South (constituency) =

Constituency of the Sai Kung District Council of Hong Kong

- Elected constituency for the Sai Kung District Council
- Boundary of Wan Po South in Sai Kung District
- District: Sai Kung
- Legislative Council constituency: New Territories South East
- Population: 18,497 (2019)
- Electorate: 8,779 (2019)

Current constituency
- Created: 2015
- Number of members: One
- Member: Cheung Mei-hung (Independent)
- Created from: Wan Po

Wan Po South is one of the 27 constituencies in the Sai Kung District.

The constituency returns one district councillor to the Sai Kung District Council, with an election every four years.

Wan Po South constituency is loosely based on most of Lohas Park in Tseung Kwan O with estimated population of 18,497.

== Councillors represented ==
Election	Member	Party
2015	Chris Cheung Mei-hung	Independent

== Election results ==
=== 2010s ===
Sai Kung District Council Election, 2019: Wan Po South
Party	Candidate	Votes	%	±%
Independent	Chris Cheung Mei-hung	3,577	52.77	−27.43
CGPLTKO	David Kan Sun-wah	2,063	30.43	
Nonpartisan	Ng Ho-kei	1,139	16.80	
Majority		1,514	22.34	
Turnout		6,792	77.38	
Independent hold		Swing		

Sai Kung District Council Election, 2015: Wan Po South
Party	Candidate	Votes	%	±%
Independent	Cheung Mei-hung	2,188	80.2	
DAB	Wu Cheuk-him	539	19.8	
Majority		1,649	60.4	
Turnout		2,744	60.2	
Independent win (new seat)				
