= 2008 Hong Kong legislative election in New Territories East =

- 7 September 2008

All 7 New Territories East seats to the Legislative Council
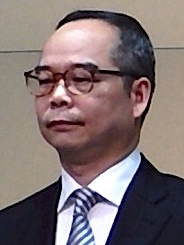

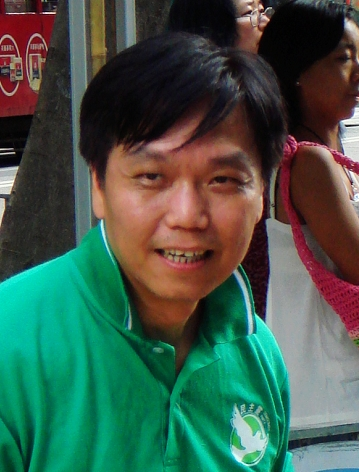

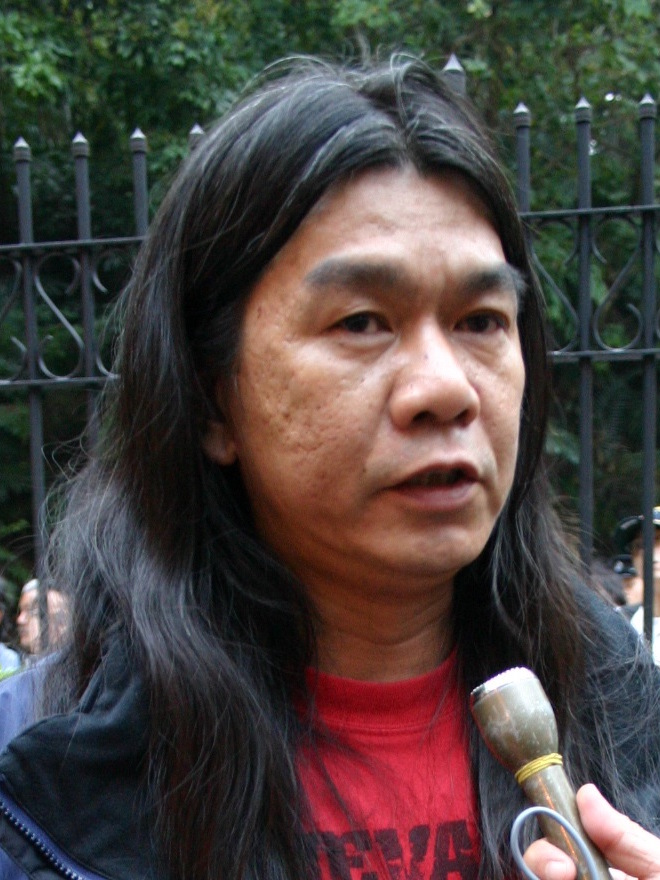

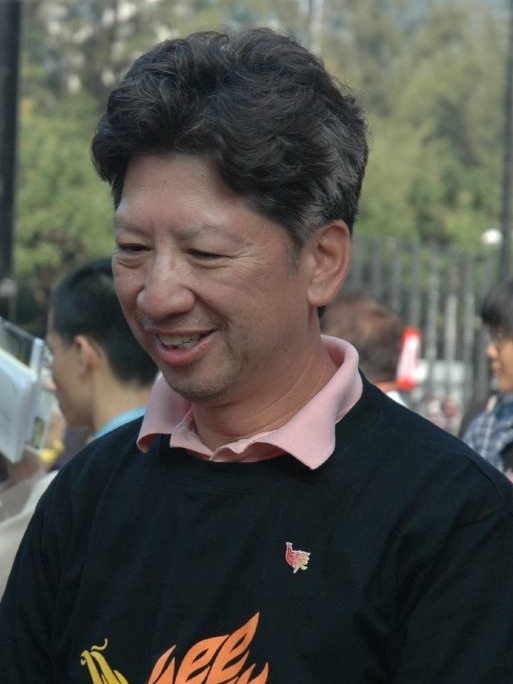

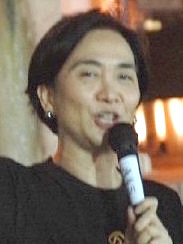

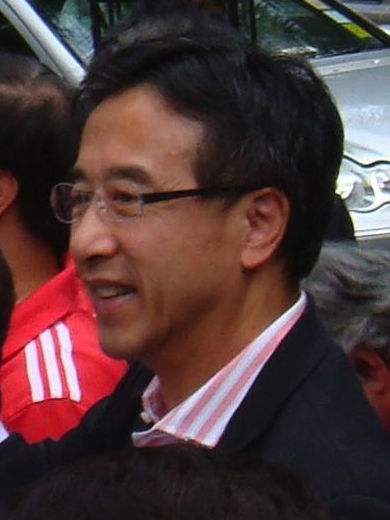
	First party	Second party	Third party
Leader	Lau Kong-wah	Wong Sing-chi & Andrew Cheng	Leung Kwok-hung
Party	DAB	Democratic	LSD
Alliance	Pro-Beijing	Pan-democracy	Pan-democracy
Last election	2 seats, 22.1%	1 seat, 16.8%	1 seat, 14.1%
Seats before	2	1	1
Seats won	2	2	1
Seat change	Steady	▲1	Steady
Popular vote	102,434	86,105	44,763
Percentage	28.4%	23.8%	12.4%
Swing	▲6.3%	▲7.0%	▼1.7%
	Fourth party	Fifth party	Sixth party
Leader	Ronny Tong	Emily Lau	James Tien
Party	Civic	Frontier	Liberal
Alliance	Pan-democracy	Pan-democracy	Pro-Beijing
Last election	1 seat, 5.6%	1 seat, 5.6%	1 seat, 15.9%
Seats before	1	1	1
Seats won	1	1	0
Seat change	Steady	Steady	▼1
Popular vote	39,957	33,205	28,875
Percentage	11.1%	9.2%	8.0%
Swing	▲5.5%	▲3.6%	▼7.9%
- Party with most votes in each District Council Constituency.

These are the New Territories East results of the 2008 Hong Kong legislative election. The election was held on 7 September 2008 and all 7 seats in New Territories East where consisted of North District, Tai Po District, Sai Kung District and Sha Tin District were contested. The pro-democracy camp succeeded in holding five seats out of seven seats, with James Tien lost his seat to Wong Sing-chi of the Democratic Party.

== Overall results ==
Before election:

↓
4	3
Pan-democracy	Pro-Beijing

Change in composition:

↓
5	2
Pan-democracy	Pro-Beijing

Party	Seats	Seats change	Contesting list(s)	Votes	%	% change
Democratic	2	+1	2	86,105	23.8	+7.0
LSD	1	0	1	44,763	12.4	−1.7
Civic	1	0	1	39,957	11.1	+5.5
Frontier	1	0	1	33,205	9.2	+3.6
Pro-democracy camp	5	+1	5	204,030	56.5	–2.2
DAB	2	0	1	102,434	28.4	+6.3
Liberal	0	–1	1	28,875	8.0	−7.9
Independent	0	0	3	25,591	7.1	N/A
Pro-Beijing camp	3	–1	5	156,900	44.7	+3.4
Turnout:				360,930	44.3	

== Candidates list ==
Legislative Election 2008: New Territories East
List	Candidates	Votes	Of total (%)	± from prev.
DAB	Lau Kong-wah, Chan Hak-kan Mok Kam-kwai, Wong Pik-kiu, Chan Kwok-kai, Lau Kwok-fan, Calvin Lin Chor-keung	102,434	28.4 (14.29+14.09)	+6.26
LSD	Leung Kwok-hung	44,763	12.4	−1.74
Democratic	Wong Sing-chi Mok Siu-lun	44,174	12.2	N/A
Democratic	Andrew Cheng Kar-foo Yam Kai-bong, Shirley Ho Suk-ping, Leung Li, Kwan Wing-yip, Michael Yung Ming-chau, Frankie Lam Siu-chung	41,931	11.6	N/A
Civic	Ronny Tong Ka-wah Tsang Kwok-fung, Tsang Kin-chiu	39,957	11.1	N/A
Frontier	Emily Lau Wai-hing Ricky Or Yiu-lam	33,205	9.2	N/A
Liberal	James Tien Pei-chun, Terry Kan Wing-fai, Christine Fong Kwok-shan	28,875	8.0	−7.91
Independent	Scarlett Pong Oi-lan	20,455	5.7	N/A
Nonpartisan	Alvin Lee Chi-wing	4,007	1.1	N/A
Party for Civil Rights and Livelihood	Siu See-kong, David Yung Chiu-wing	1,129	0.3	N/A
Total valid votes		360,930	100.00	
Rejected ballots		2,029		
Turnout		362,959	44.25	–12.17
Registered electors		820,205		

== See also ==
- Legislative Council of Hong Kong
- Hong Kong legislative elections
- 2008 Hong Kong legislative election
