= Shi Jiarun =

Chinese politician (born 1977)

- 施家倫
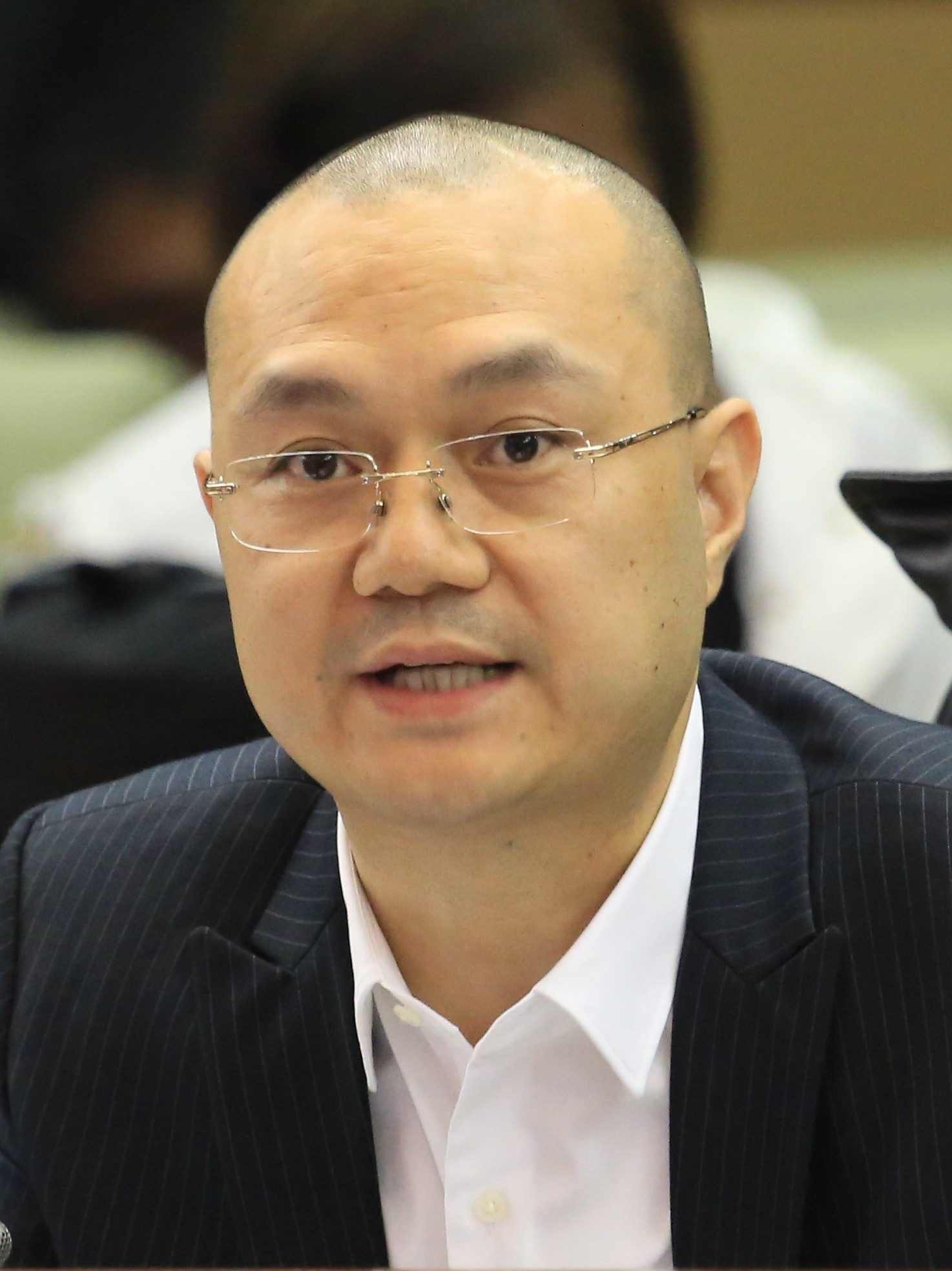
- Shi Jiarun in 2016

Member of the 13th–14th sessions of the Chinese National People's Congress from Macau
- Incumbent
- Assumed office March 5, 2018

Member of the Legislative Assembly of Macau
- Incumbent
- Assumed office October 16, 2013
- Constituency: Directly elected member (2013-2025); Business, Industry, and Finance (2025-present)

Personal details
- Born: Si Ka Lon; December 1, 1977 (age 48) Jinjiang, Fujian, People's Republic of China
- Party: ACUM

Shi Jiarun (Portuguese: Si Ka Lon; Chinese: 施家倫; born December 1, 1977) is a Chinese businessman, finance executive, and politician who is currently serving as a member of the 14th National People's Congress and as a member of the Legislative Assembly of Macau since 2013, where he has led the Macau United Citizens Association.

== Early life and career ==
Shi Jialun was born on December 1, 1977 in Jinjiang, a city located in the southeastern part of Fujian but moved to Macau at the age of six and went on to earn a Doctorate of Philosophy in Comparative Politics from Tsinghua University. He later worked as a community service officer and in the finance sector, later running a non-governmental organization aimed at improving cross-strait relations.

== Political career ==
After leaving finance in 2006, Shi Jiarun joined the Macau United Citizens Association and was elected as a member of the 5th Legislative Assembly of Macau in 2013 and went on to be re-elected in 2017, 2021, and 2025. In 2017, he was elected as a representative of the 13th National People's Congress and was re-elected to the 14th National People's Congress in 2023.
