= 2015 Sai Kung District Council election =

Hong Kong local election

- 22 November 2015

27 (of the 29) seats to Sai Kung District Council 15 seats needed for a majority
- Turnout: 46.7%
	First party	Second party	Third party
Party	DAB	Neo Democrats	NPP/CF
Last election	7 seats, 14.1%	4 seats, 16.9%	3 seats, 15.0%
Seats before	8	4	3
Seats won	8	5	3
Seat change	Steady	▲1	Steady
Popular vote	18,836	12,721	9,172
Percentage	18.7%	12.6%	9.1%
Swing	▲4.6%	▼4.3%	▼4.6%
	Fourth party	Fifth party
Party	Democratic	FTU
Last election	2 seats, 15.2%	2 seats, 6.2%
Seats before	2	1
Seats won	2	2
Seat change	Steady	▼1
Popular vote	10,603	6,837
Percentage	10.5%	6.8%
Swing	▼4.7%	▲0.6%
- Colours on map indicate winning party for each constituency.

The 2015 Sai Kung District Council election was held on 22 November 2015 to elect all 27 elected members to the 29-member Sai Kung District Council.

== Overall election results ==
Before election:

↓
9	2	13
Pro-democracy	Ind.	Pro-Beijing

Change in composition:

↓
10	4	13
Pro-democracy	Ind.	Pro-Beijing

Sai Kung District Council election result 2015
Party	Seats	Gains	Losses	Net gain/loss	Seats %	Votes %	Votes	+/−
Independent	8	1	0	+1	29.6	37.7	38,106	
DAB	8	1	1	0	29.2	18.7	18,836	+4.6
Neo Democrats	5	1	0	+1	18.5	12.6	12,721	–4.3
Democratic	2	1	1	0	7.4	10.5	10,603	−4.7
NPP/CF	3	0	0	0	11.1	9.1	9,172	–4.6
FTU	1	0	1	–1	3.7	6.8	6,837	+0.6
Liberal	0	0	0	0	0	2.4	2,451	+0.2
People Power	0	0	0	0	0	2.2	2,234	+1.9
