= Wai King (constituency) =

Constituency of the Sai Kung District Council of Hong Kong

- Elected constituency for the Sai Kung District Council
- Boundary of Wai King in Sai Kung District
- District: Sai Kung
- Legislative Council constituency: New Territories South East
- Population: 14,598 (2019)
- Electorate: 7,776 (2019)

Current constituency
- Created: 2007
- Number of members: One
- Member: Vacant

Wai King (Chinese: 維景), formerly Wai Do from 2007 to 2015, is one of the 29 constituencies in the Sai Kung District.

The constituency returns one district councillor to the Sai Kung District Council, with an election every four years.

Wai King constituency is loosely based on Ocean Shores in Tiu Keng Leng with estimated population of 14,598.

== Councillors represented ==
Election	Member	Party
2007	Chan Kai-wai	Independent
2019	Brandon Kenneth Yip→Vacant	Nonpartisan

== Election results ==
=== 2010s ===
Sai Kung District Council Election, 2019: Wai King
Party	Candidate	Votes	%	±%
Nonpartisan	Brandon Kenneth Yip	3,199	50.86	
Independent	Chan Kai-wai	3,021	48.03	
Independent	Jack Wong Shing-kwong	70	1.11	
Majority		178	2.83	
Turnout		6,303	81.06	
Nonpartisan gain from Independent		Swing		
