= Christine Fong =

Hong Kong engineer and politician (born 1966)

The Honourable Christine Fong
- 方國珊
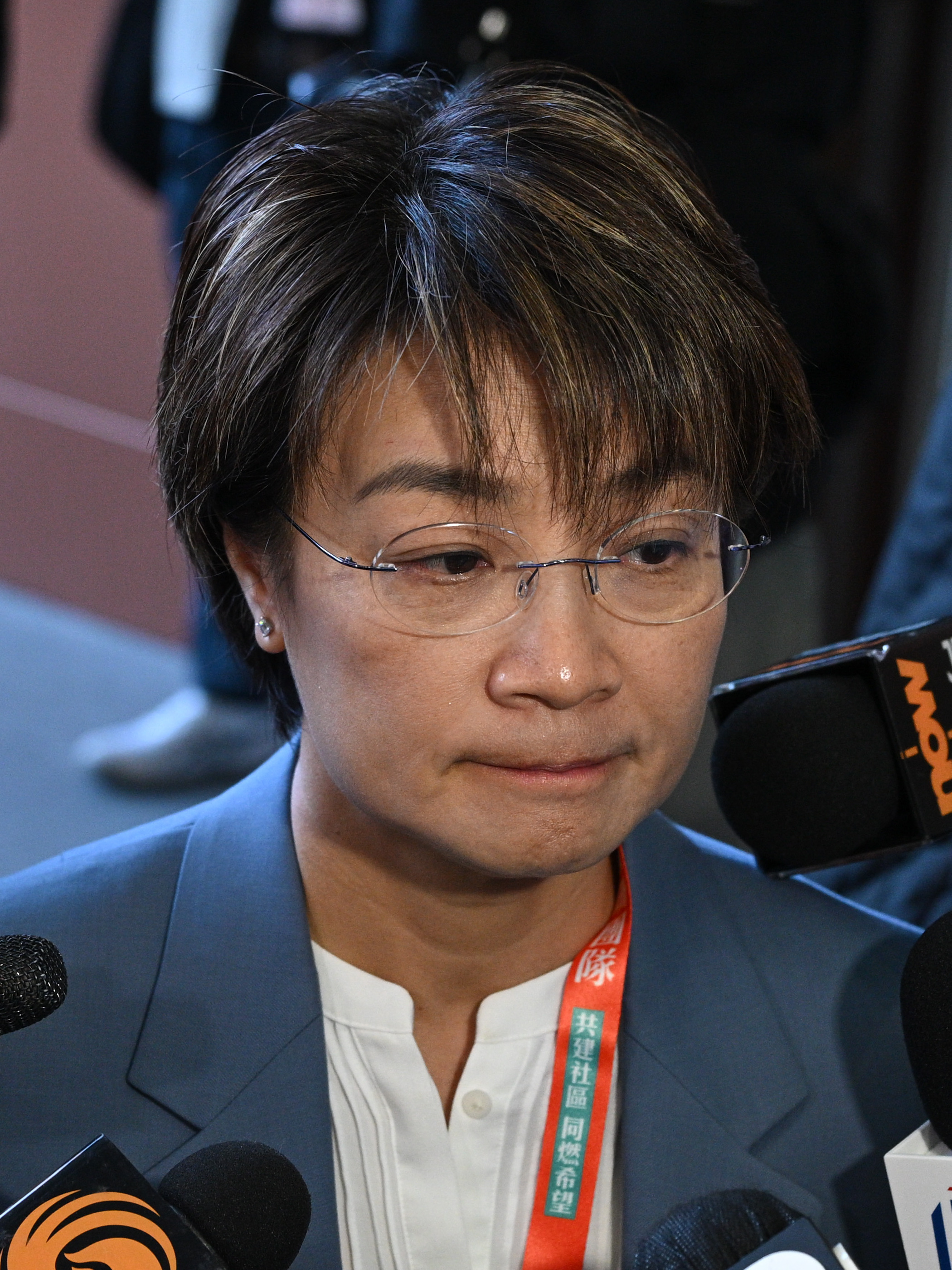
- Fong in 2025

Member of the Legislative Council of Hong Kong
- Incumbent
- Assumed office 1 January 2026
- Preceded by: Lam So-wai
- Constituency: New Territories South East

Member of the Sai Kung District Council
- Incumbent
- Assumed office 1 January 2012
- Preceded by: New constituency
- Constituency: Sai Kung and Hang Hau (since 2024); Wan Po North (2015–2023); Wan Po (until 2015)
- In office 1 January 2008 – 31 December 2011
- Constituency: Appointed

Chairperson of Professional Power
- Incumbent
- Assumed office 2010
- Deputy Chair: Po Wai Ming; Woo Tsz-cheung
- Preceded by: New Party

Personal details
- Born: 28 March 1966 (age 60) Hong Kong
- Party: Professional Power (2010–)
- Other political affiliations: Liberal Party (2004–10)
- Education: University of Hawaiʻi
- Occupation: District councillor
- Profession: Engineer

Christine Fong Kwok-shan
- Traditional Chinese: 方國珊
- Simplified Chinese: 方国珊
Transcriptions
Standard Mandarin
- Hanyu Pinyin: Fāng Guóshān
Yue: Cantonese
- Jyutping: fong1 gwok3 saan1

Christine Fong Kwok-shan (Chinese: 方國珊, born 28 March 1966) is an engineer and politician in Hong Kong, as well as a former child actress. She is a current member of the Sai Kung District Council and was elected in the 2025 Hong Kong legislative election to represent the New Territories South East constituency, with her Legislative Council term beginning in January 2026.

== Early life, education, and career ==
Fong was a child actress at Asia Television in the 1980s. Actor Bowie Wu is her godfather. She got famous from her role, Nezha, in the 1986 TV series The Boy Fighter from Heaven, and is nicknamed after the role. After she graduated from the University of Hawaiʻi with a bachelor's degree in Business Administration, she obtained the qualification of a building engineer and worked as secretary of Cheung Yan-lung, a powerful rural leader.

== District councillor ==
She joined the Liberal Party in 2004 and served as the chairperson of the New Territories East Branch until 9 December 2010 when, after concerns grew over the Liberal Party prioritizing larger businesses over smaller businesses and issues arising over standard working hours, she quit the Liberals and formed Professional Power. She was appointed to the Sai Kung District Council in 2008 and elected to the Council through the new Wan Po constituency in the 2011 election with extreme high votes.

She has been outspoken against the government's plan of the extension of the Tseung Kwan O landfill which is located in her constituency. She also launched a 35-hour fast outside the Legislative Council building to protest against the landfill extensions in 2013.

Fong was also involved in an assault case against Elizabeth Quat, a Legislative Councillor of the Democratic Alliance for the Betterment and Progress of Hong Kong (DAB), when Fong and a group of protestors confronted Quat in a protest against the extension of the Tseung Kwan O landfill. She was later found not guilty of the charge on 22 February 2016 finally.

In 2015 election, she was re-elected through the Wan Po North constituency which was split from her original constituency after a boundary review. She clung on to her seat in 2019 District Council elections in Hong Kong by 170 votes, following a rout of pro-Beijing candidates amidst the 2019–20 Hong Kong protests.

== Legislative Council elections ==
Formerly affiliated with the Liberal Party, Fong made her first attempt for the Legislative Council in the 2008 Hong Kong legislative election in New Territories East, though she was not elected. She later contested the 2012 Hong Kong legislative election in New Territories East as an independent for the second time, receiving 24,594 votes—about 4,000 short of winning a seat.

In the 2016 New Territories East by-election, she finished fourth place in the election by receiving 33,424 votes, around 8,000 more than the 2012 election.

Fong ran for the New Territories East multi-seat constituency again in the 2016 Hong Kong legislative election for the fourth time and came 10th, falling short of the lowest-ranking winner Leung Kwok-hung by about 1000 votes.

In the March 2018 Hong Kong by-elections for the Legislative Council, Christine Fong ran as an independent candidate in the New Territories East constituency and received 64,905 votes, finishing in third place.

In the 2021 Hong Kong legislative election, Fong decided not to participate in the election, instead fielding Lam So-wai as a candidate.

In the 2025 Hong Kong legislative election, Fong returned to contest the New Territories South East constituency within the reformed electoral framework first introduced in the previous election. She achieved a resounding victory, securing 58,828 votes, the highest votes in the whole campaign.

=== Legislative Council victory in 2025 ===
Christine Fong's landslide victory in the 2025 Hong Kong legislative election, in which she secured 58,828 votes, represented approximately 42.3% of all votes cast in the New Territories South East constituency. Fong secured a decisive edge over other candidates in 37 of the 55 general polling stations across her constituency, which spans from Sai Kung to parts of Sha Tin. Her strongest support came from the Tseung Kwan O area, where she dominated key polling stations, accounting for over 85% of the votes at Creative Secondary School near LOHAS Park. Fong also achieved commanding vote shares at Po Lam Sports Centre, Tsui Lam Sports Centre, and Lohas Park Community Hall, consistently polling above 70% in these areas. In Sai Kung proper, she maintained notable dominance, often ranking first or second, with vote shares between 55–65%, showing her appeal across both urban and semi-rural communities. Fong's vote distribution shows a clear geographic concentration of support in TKO, while still maintaining competitive strength in adjacent Sha Tin districts. These figures affirm her territorial stronghold and highly effective overall local mobilisation strategy.

Fong's success was seen as a culmination of years of persistence, reflecting her growing public support and long-standing presence in the Sai Kung, Clear Water Bay, and Tseung Kwan O communities. The result cemented her reputation as a committed and pragmatic advocate, recognised for her policy expertise and unwavering focus on district-level issues such as transport infrastructure, land use planning, and sustainable development – including her outspoken stance on the controversial Area 137 development project in Tseung Kwan O. Her well-informed and technically grounded positions were often translated into concrete Council action, and her successful advocacy helped shape follow-up measures such as extended public engagement, consideration of alternative facility locations, and technical studies on environmental and transport concerns, further reinforcing her impact as a district councillor and strong community advocate.

Speaking after her electoral victory, Fong attributed her success to the support of voters, and emphasised that it would be vital to remain focused on important public concerns particularly in light of the Tai Po fire tragedy. While Fong said she was honoured to be elected, she stressed the urgency of addressing the aftermath of the incident, which she described as "really saddening" and a moment of collective grief for all Hong Kong citizens.

== Political stance ==
Fong and Professional Power have been widely considered as a centrist political faction. They have competed directly with both the pro-Beijing camp and the pro-democracy camp. In the 2016 Hong Kong legislative election, it was reported that the Hong Kong Liaison Office tried to persuade pro-Beijing campaigners to "allocate" tactical votes to Fong without success.

In 2019 Hong Kong local elections, many candidates of the Professional Power were not challenged by any parties or independent politicians from the pro-Beijing camp. Prior to the polling day, there was a list widely circulated in LIHKG and Factcheck.io. The list claimed itself as a list of candidates endorsed by Hong Kong Federation of Trade Unions. The list included six candidates from the Professional Power.
