= Centrism in Hong Kong =

Centrism in Hong Kong refers to a political outlook and alignment that positions itself between the pro-democracy and pro-Beijing camps. Those within this alignment are often referred to as the centrist camp (中間派), centrist groups, moderate camp or moderate groups.

Although they are not actively pro-government at the level of the pro-Beijing camp, many centrists interact with and support the Chinese government; for example, Ronny Tong of Path of Democracy entered the Executive Council of Hong Kong. Both Path of Democracy and Third Side join the ‘patriots-only’ legislative election.

== History ==
A 2015 poll by The University of Hong Kong found that 41.9% of Hong Kong's population describe themselves as "centrists", 28.4% as "pro-democracy camp supporters", and 11.4% as "pro-Beijing camp supporters".

Christine Fong and Wong Sing-chi, classified as centrist in the 2016 New Territories East by-election, lost to Alvin Yeung, classified as pro-democracy camp. At the time, Christine Fong received 33,424 votes, while Wong Singh-chi received 17,257 votes; in New Territories, the centrist camp received about 12%.

Third Side chairman Tik Chi-yuen claims that voters abandoned the centrist line and voted for a pro-Beijing camp because of the 'Returning to the Edge Effect' (歸邊效應) in the election. He analyzed that the centrist camp is likely to win 1 seat in the New Territories if it works with centrist politicians at the 2016 Hong Kong legislative election.

In the 2016 Hong Kong legislative election; Wong Singh-chi bolted from the Third Side and ran for the Social Welfare functional constitution, Tik Chi-yuen ran for the Kowloon West, Christine Fong was eliminated from 10th place with 34,544 votes in the eastern district of New Territories, the Path of Democracy sent two lists to Hong Kong Island and the eastern part of the New Territories and losing with 10,028 and 8,084 votes (respectively, which was a very small number of votes, resulting in the confiscation of the election deposit).

In the 2021 Hong Kong legislative election, the only centrist candidate elected was Tik Chi-yuen.

== Political organizations ==
=== Current ===
- Hong Kong Civic Association (1954–present)
- Path of Democracy (2015–present)
- Third Side (2016–present)
- HK Round Table on People's Livelihood (2022–present)

=== Former ===
- Hope for Hong Kong (2020–2021)

== Macau ==
In Macau, there are two political parties that are part of the centrist spectrum, Synergy of Macao and Macao Civic Power.

== See also ==
- Centrism by country

=== Other ideologies in Hong Kong ===
- Anarchism in Hong Kong
- Conservatism in Hong Kong
- Liberalism in Hong Kong
- Localism in Hong Kong
- Socialism in Hong Kong
