= Gary Fan =

Hong Kong politician

Gary Fan Kwok-wai
- 范國威
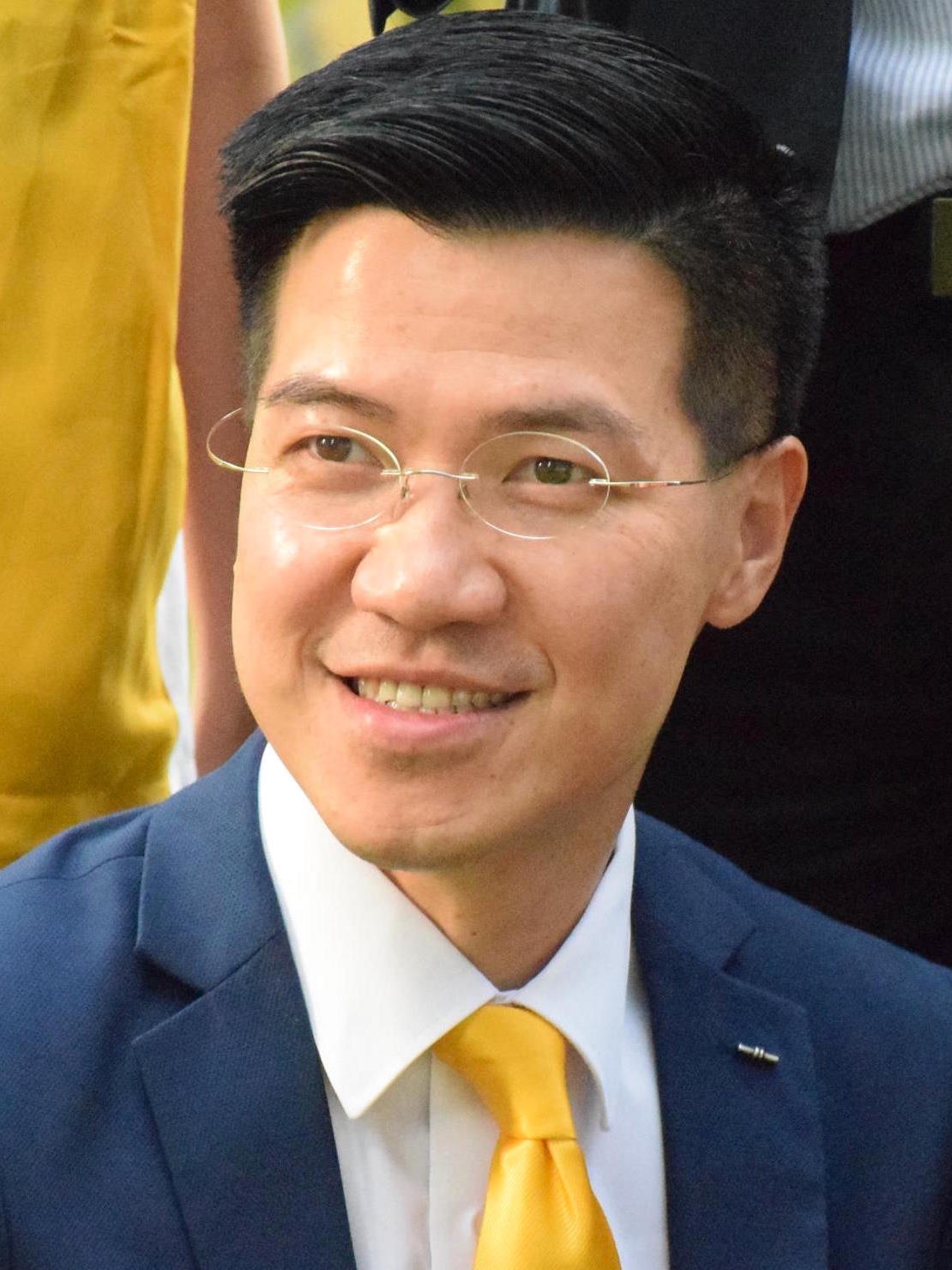
- Gary Fan in 2015

Member of the Legislative Council
- In office 12 March 2018 – 17 December 2019
- Preceded by: Sixtus Leung
- Succeeded by: Constituency abolished
- Constituency: New Territories East
- In office 1 October 2012 – 30 September 2016
- Preceded by: Seat Created
- Succeeded by: Sixtus Leung
- Constituency: New Territories East

Member of the Sai Kung District Council
- In office 1 January 2000 – 16 March 2021
- Preceded by: Constituency created
- Constituency: Wan Hang

Personal details
- Born: 30 October 1966 (age 59) British Hong Kong
- Party: Democratic Party (1996–2010); The Frontier (1996–97); Social Democratic Forum (2000–02); Neo Democrats (since 2010); HK First (since 2013)
- Education: Academy of Art University (BFA); San Francisco State University (MA)
- Occupation: Legislative Councillor; District Councillor
- Website: garyfan.org

Gary Fan
- Traditional Chinese: 范國威
- Simplified Chinese: 范国威
Transcriptions
Standard Mandarin
- Hanyu Pinyin: Fàn Guówēi
Yue: Cantonese
- Yale Romanization: Faahn Gwok wāi
- Jyutping: Faan^{6} Gwok^{3}wai^{1}

Gary Fan Kwok-wai (Chinese: 范國威; born 30 October 1966) is a Hong Kong politician. He was a member of the Legislative Council from 2012 to 2016 and from 2018 to 2019 after winning the 2018 by-election for New Territories East. He is also a former member of the Sai Kung District Council for Wan Hang. Former leader of the reformist faction in the Democratic Party, he led the reformists splitting from the party to form the Neo Democrats over the controversial 2010 constitutional reform proposal, taking a moderate localist stance.

After the disqualification of Ventus Lau, a 2018 by-election candidate, was ruled unlawful by the Court of Final Appeal, the by-election was seen as invalid and Fan was unseated in December 2019 as a result.

== Party politics ==
After having graduated from San Francisco State University, Fan joined the Democratic Party after returning to Hong Kong. Fan was a leading member of the Democratic Party, including being a member of the standing committee of its central committee.

Fan opposed the Democratic party's stance on the Five Constituencies Referendum movement and its support of the constitutional reform package in 2010. He, Chan King-ming and other reformists quit the Democratic Party in December 2010. Before that they had already formed the Neo Democrats political grouping on 2 October 2010. He held the position of one of its four convenors from 2010 to 2012.

In the 2012 LegCo elections, Fan won a new seat in the New Territoires East geographical constituency created under the 2010 constitutional reform package.

== Legislative councillor ==
Gary Fan has taken an anti-immigration stance in the Legislative Council, differing from other pan-democrats who tended to support new arrivals. Fan called for the government to take back the approval rights on One-way Permits from Chinese authorities and to reduce the quota of such permits. Fan also refers to immigrants from mainland China and the quota of 150 daily permits as "the root of the housing problem".

In January 2013, Gary Fan and Claudia Mo formed a group called "HK First". They co-sponsored a controversial ad which claimed that reducing immigration would help the people of Hong Kong to get to the bottom of the housing problem, while rejecting claims of bias or discrimination against mainlanders, despite condemnation from the Equal Opportunities Commission. Fan later introduced a motion on adhering to the need to "put Hong Kong people first" in formulating policies, but the motion was ultimately defeated.

He lost his seat in New Territories East in the 2016 Legislative Council election, as Andrew Cheng returned unexpectedly and split the democratic faction's votes. As a result, he resigned his party position as an executive committee member.

He returned to the Legislative Council in the 2018 New Territories by-election following the disqualification of localist Baggio Leung of Youngspiration over the Legislative Council oath-taking controversy in March. He was elected with more than 180,000 votes, defeating the pro-Beijing common candidate Tang Ka-piu of the Hong Kong Federation of Trade Unions (FTU) and the Democratic Alliance for the Betterment and Progress of Hong Kong (DAB).

After the disqualification of Ventus Lau, a 2018 by-election candidate, was ruled unlawful by the Court of Final Appeal, the by-election was seen as invalid and Fan was unseated in December 2019 alongside Au Nok-hin as a result, after the Court of Final Appeal rejected both appeal applications.

== District councillor ==
He was first elected as District Councillor in the Sai Kung District Council for Wan Hang in 1999. He was re-elected by a comfortable majority on 22 November 2015. As a District Council member he serves on various committees:

- District Facilities Management Committee
- Social Services and Healthy and Safe City Committee
- Housing and Environmental Hygiene Committee
- Traffic and Transport Committee
- Finance and Administration Committee

As well as being a district councillor, Fan is also a part-time tutor at the Open University of Hong Kong.

== Arrest ==
On 6 January 2021, Fan was among 53 members of the pro-democratic camp who were arrested under the national security law, specifically its provision regarding alleged subversion. The group stood accused of the organisation of and participation in unofficial primary elections held by the camp in July 2020. Fan was released on bail on 7 January.

On 28 February 2021, Fan was formally charged, along with 46 others for subversion, and he was remanded in prison. On 2 November, High Court judge Esther Toh upheld her decision to deny bail to Fan arguing that he was a "determined and resolute man" who called for all parties to act together in opposing the government.

== See also ==
- Claudia Mo

Political offices
New constituency	Member of Sai Kung District Council; Representative for Wan Hang; 2000–2021	Vacant
Legislative Council of Hong Kong
New seat	Member of Legislative Council; Representative for New Territories East; 2012–2016	Succeeded by Sixtus Leung
Preceded by Sixtus Leung	Member of Legislative Council; Representative for New Territories East; 2018–2019	Succeeded by Vacant
