= Sai Kung District Council =

Hong Kong district council

Coordinates: 22.3173°N 114.2682°E

Sai Kung District Council 西貢區議會

Type
- Type: Hong Kong District Council of the Sai Kung District

History
- Founded: 1 April 1981 (District Board); 1 July 1997 (Provisional); 1 January 2000 (District Council)

Leadership
- Chair: Kathy Ma King-fan, Independent
- Vice-Chair: Vacant

Structure
- Seats: 32 councillors consisting of 6 elected members 12 district committee members 12 appointed members 2 ex-officio members
- DAB: 10 / 32
- FTU: 3 / 32
- NPP/CF: 3 / 32
- PP: 1 / 32
- Liberal: 1 / 32
- Independent: 14 / 32

Elections
- Voting system: First past the post
- Last election: 10 December 2023

Meeting place
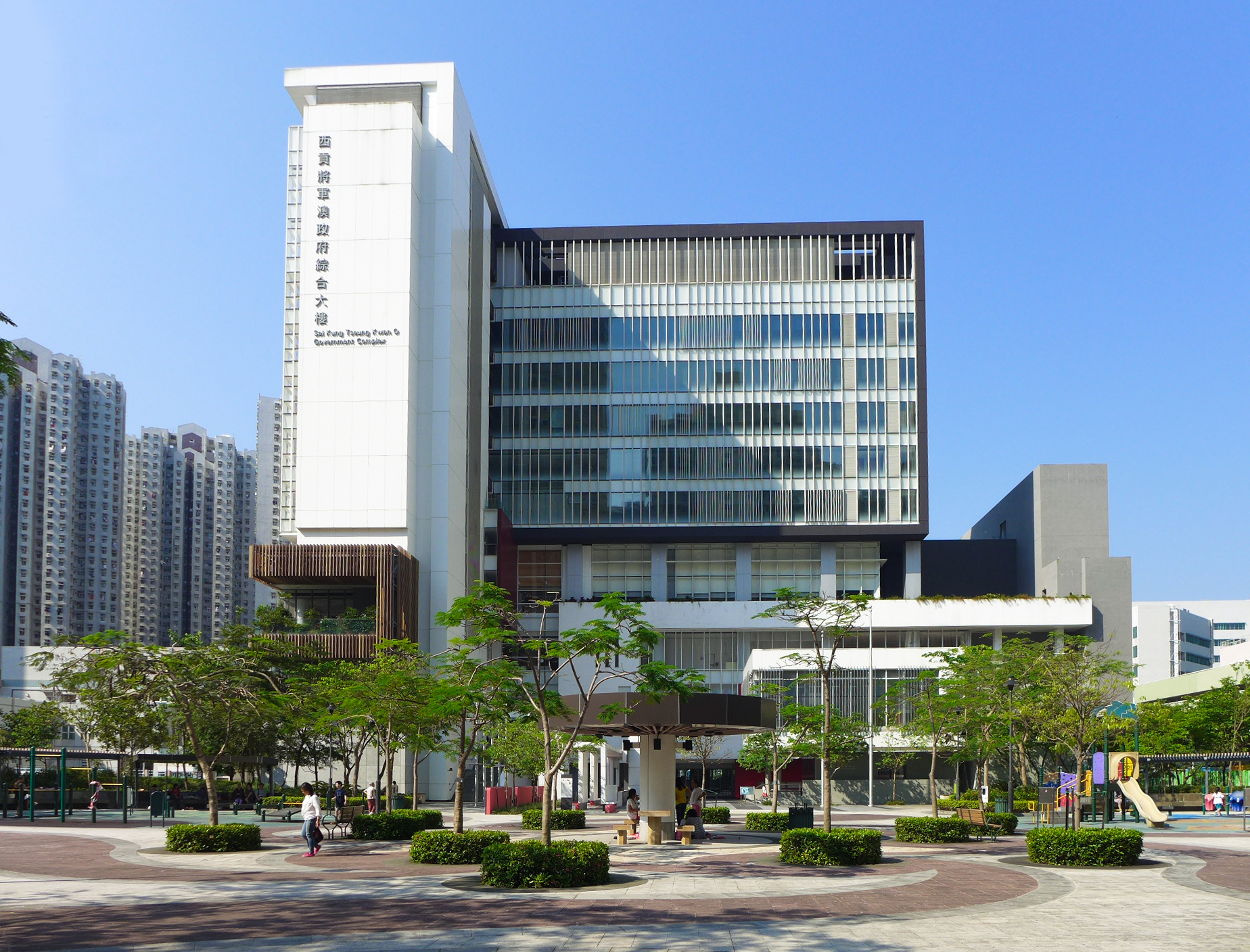
- 4/F, Sai Kung Tseung Kwan O Government Complex, 38 Pui Shing Road, Tseung Kwan O

Website
- www.districtcouncils.gov.hk/sk/

Sai Kung District Council
- Traditional Chinese: 西貢區議會
- Simplified Chinese: 西贡区议会
Transcriptions
Standard Mandarin
- Hanyu Pinyin: Xīgòng Qūyìhuì
Yue: Cantonese
- Jyutping: sai1 gung3 keoi1 ji5 wui6*2

The Sai Kung District Council (Chinese: 西貢區議會; noted as SK) is the district council for the Sai Kung District in Hong Kong. It is one of 18 such councils. The Sai Kung District Council currently consists of 32 members, of which the district is divided into three constituencies, electing a total of 6 members, 12 district committee members, 12 appointed members, and two ex-officio members who are the Hang Hau and Sai Kung rural committee chairmen. The latest election was held on 10 December 2023.

== History ==
The Sai Kung District Council was established on 1 April 1981 under the name of the Sai Kung District Board as the result of the colonial Governor Murray MacLehose's District Administration Scheme reform. The District Board was partly elected with the ex-officio Regional Council members and chairmen of two Rural Committees, Hang Hau and Sai Kung, as well as members appointed by the Governor until 1994 when last Governor Chris Patten refrained from appointing any member.

The Sai Kung District Board became Sai Kung Provisional District Board after the Hong Kong Special Administrative Region (HKSAR) was established in 1997 with the appointment system being reintroduced by Chief Executive Tung Chee-hwa. The current Sai Kung District Council was established on 1 January 2000 after the first District Council election in 1999. The appointed seats were abolished in 2015 after the modified constitutional reform proposal was passed by the Legislative Council in 2010.

The Sai Kung District Council is one of the fastest growing councils due to the rapid development of Tseung Kwan O new town in the late 1990s and early 2000s. Traditionally dominated by the rural forces, different political parties also established its presence in the urban area in the 1990s. The pro-Beijing Democratic Alliance for the Betterment of Hong Kong (DAB) doubled their seats from four to eight after absorbed the Hong Kong Progressive Alliance (HKPA) in 2005 and became the largest party in the council. The pro-Beijing Civil Force which has been in alliance with the New People's Party also has substantial presence in the district. The pro-democracy camp in the district was represented by the Democratic Party, until it lost half of its seats after the reformist faction led by Gary Fan quit the party and formed the Neo Democrats in 2010 over the disagreement on the constitutional reform proposal.

In the 2019 election, the pro-democrats scored a landslide victory by taking 26 of the 29 seats in the council, with Neo Democrats becoming the largest party and Concern Group for Tseung Kwan O People's Livelihood (CGPLTKO) the second largest grouping. The pro-Beijing camp was almost completely wiped out from the council, except for the two ex-officio Rural Committee chairmen and three moderate councillors led by Christine Fong.

In the 2023 District Council election, 6 of the 32 seats on the Sai Kung District Council are elected by elected members, 12 are elected by district committees, 12 appointed members, and 2 ex-officio members make up the current Sai Kung District In the Parliament, among the 32 seats, there are 14 independent members, 10 seats from the Democratic Alliance for the Betterment of Hong Kong, 3 seats from the Federation of Trade Unions, 3 seats from the New People Party, 1 seat from the Liberal Party, and 1 seat from the Professional Dynamics. Among the 22 members, the pro-establishment camp holds 22 seats.

== Political control ==
Since 1982 political control of the council has been held by the following parties:

Camp in control	Largest party	Years	Composition
No Overall Control	None	1982 - 1985	
Pro-government	People's Association	1985 - 1988	
Pro-government	None	1988 - 1991	
Pro-government	ADPL	1991 - 1994	
Pro-Beijing	Democratic	1994 - 1997	
Pro-Beijing	Democratic	1997 - 1999	
Pro-Beijing	DAB	2000 - 2003	
Pro-Beijing	DAB	2004 - 2007	
Pro-Beijing	DAB	2008 - 2011	
Pro-Beijing	DAB	2012 - 2015	
Pro-Beijing	DAB	2016 - 2019	
Pro-democracy → NOC	Neo Democrats → CGPLTKO	2020 - 2023	
Pro-Beijing	DAB	2024 - 2027	

== Political makeup ==

Elections are held every four years.

Political party	Council members							Current members
Political party	1994	1999	2003	2007	2011	2015	2019	Current members
Independent	6	6	5	4	6	8	14	15 / 31
CGPLTKO	-	-	-	-	-	-	0	5 / 31
SKC	-	-	-	-	-	-	3	3 / 31
TKO Pioneers	-	-	-	-	-	-	2	2 / 31
TKO Shining	-	-	-	-	-	-	1	2 / 31

== District result maps ==
1994

1999

2003

2007

2011

2015

2019

== Members represented ==
Capacity	Code	Constituency	Name	Term		Political affiliation	Notes
Elected	Q01	Sai Kung and Hang Hau	Christine Fong Kwok-shan	1 January 2024	Incumbent	PP	
Elected	Q01	Sai Kung and Hang Hau	Yau Ho-lun	1 January 2024	Incumbent	DAB	
Elected	Q02	Tseung Kwan O South	Amber Sze Pan-pan	1 January 2024	Incumbent	DAB	
Elected	Q02	Tseung Kwan O South	James Wong Yuen-ho	1 January 2024	Incumbent	FTU	
Elected	Q03	Tseung Kwan O North	Edwin Wan Kai-ming	1 January 2024	Incumbent	DAB	
Elected	Q03	Tseung Kwan O North	Victor Chan Chi-ho	1 January 2024	Incumbent	NPP/CF	
District Committees			Philip Li Ka-leung	1 January 2024	Incumbent	DAB	
District Committees			Kan Tung-tung	1 January 2024	Incumbent	DAB	
District Committees			Chau Ka-lok	1 January 2024	Incumbent	DAB	
District Committees			Cheng Yu-hei	1 January 2024	Incumbent	FTU	
District Committees			Ken Chan Kin-chun	1 January 2024	Incumbent	NPP/CF	
District Committees			Tam Chuk-kwan	1 January 2024	Incumbent	NPP/CF	
District Committees			Chan Kwong-fai	1 January 2024	Incumbent	TKODFG	
District Committees			Chapman Chan Kai-wai	1 January 2024	Incumbent	Independent	
District Committees			Li Tin-chi	1 January 2024	Incumbent	Independent	
District Committees			Chris Cheung Mei-hung	1 January 2024	Incumbent	Independent	
District Committees			Cheung Chin-pang	1 January 2024	Incumbent	Independent	
District Committees			Tsang Kwok-ka	1 January 2024	Incumbent	Independent	
Appointed			Ki Lai-mei	1 January 2024	Incumbent	DAB	
Appointed			Chong Yuen-tung	1 January 2024	Incumbent	DAB	
Appointed			Angel Chong Nga-ting	1 January 2024	Incumbent	DAB	
Appointed			Chan Kuen-kwan	1 January 2024	Incumbent	DAB	
Appointed			Lam Chun-ka	1 January 2024	Incumbent	Liberal	
Appointed			Wong Wang-to	1 January 2024	Incumbent	FTU	
Appointed			Wang Wen	1 January 2024	Incumbent	Independent	
Appointed			Ellen Li Ka-yan	1 January 2024	Incumbent	Independent	
Appointed			Kelvin Yau Siu-hung	1 January 2024	Incumbent	Independent	
Appointed			Natasha Yu	1 January 2024	Incumbent	Independent	
Appointed			Wu Suet-ling	1 January 2024	Incumbent	Independent	
Appointed			Cheung Man-tim	1 January 2024	Incumbent	Independent	
Ex Officio		Hang Hau Rural Committee Chairman	Lau Kai-hong	1 January 2024	Incumbent	Independent	
Ex Officio		Sai Kung Rural Committee Chairman	Wong Shui-sang	1 January 2024	Incumbent	Independent	

== Leadership ==
=== Chairs ===
Since 1985, the chairman is elected by all the members of the board:

Chairman	Years	Political Affiliation
Chan Sui-jeung	1981–1984	District Officer
Carrie Lam Cheng Yuet-ngor	1984	District Officer
Kevin Ho Chi-ming	1984-1985	District Officer
William Wan Hon-cheung	1985–1994	PHKS/Heung Yee Kuk→DAB
George Ng Sze-fuk	1994–2019	Independent→PA→DAB
Ben Chung Kam-lun	2020–2021	Neo Democrats
Francis Chau Yin-ming	2021–2023	Independent
Kathy Ma King-fan	2024–present	District Officer

=== Vice Chairs ===
Vice Chairman	Years	Political Affiliation
Francis Chau Yin-ming	2000–2007	Independent
Wan Yuet-kau	2008–2011	DAB
Chan Kwok-kei	2012–2015	DAB
Shing Hon-keung	2016–2019	Heung Yee Kuk
Ling Man-hoi	2019–2020	DAB
Francis Chau Yin-ming	2020–2021	Independent
Lui Man-kwong	2021–2023	Neo Democrats→Independent
