= Portuguese Macau =

Portuguese colony in East Asia (1557–1999)

Coordinates: 22°10′N 113°33′E

Province of Macau (1951–1976) Província de Macau (Portuguese) 澳門省 (Chinese) Territory of Macau (1976–1999) Território de Macau (Portuguese) 澳門地區 (Chinese)
- 1557–1999
- Semi Official Flag (1975–1999) Coat of arms (1976–1999)
- Anthem: Hymno Patriótico; ("Patriotic Anthem"); (1808–1826); Hino da Carta; ("Hymn of the Charter"); (1826–1910); A Portuguesa; ("The Portuguese"); (1910–1999)
- Flags of Municipalities

- Status: Portuguese-administered settlement under lease by Ming dynasty and Qing dynasty (1557–1849); Colony of Portugal (1849–1951); Overseas province of Portugal (1951–1976); Chinese territory under Portuguese administration (1976–1999)
- Capital and largest city: Macau
- Official languages: Portuguese; Chinese (from 1991)
- Religion: Roman Catholicism; Buddhism; Folk
- Demonym: Macanese
- Head of State
  - 1557: King John III (first)
  - 1996–1999: President Jorge Sampaio (last)
- Governor
  - 1557–1558: Francisco Martins (first)
  - 1992–1999: Vasco Rocha Vieira (last)
- Legislature: Council of Macau; (1583–1849); Legislative Assembly; (1976–1999)
- Historical era: Age of Exploration; Early Modern Period; Late Modern Period
  - Portuguese settlement established: 1557
  - Sino-Portuguese Treaty of Peking: 1 December 1887
  - 12-3 incident: 1966–1967
  - Sino-Portuguese Joint Declaration: 26 March 1987
  - Handover of Macau: 20 December 1999

Area
  - Total: 21 km^{2} (8.1 sq mi)

Population
  - 1998 estimate: 409,620
- GDP (PPP): estimate
  - Per capita: $34,091
- GDP (nominal): 1998 estimate
  - Total: $6,79 billion
  - Per capita: $16,595
- Currency: Macanese Pataca (1894–1999)
- Internet TLD: .mo
Preceded by	Succeeded by
Xiangshan County, Guangdong	Macau
- Today part of: Macau
- ^{1} Chinese was made official in 1991. Cantonese was the most commonly spoken variety.

Macau was under Portuguese rule from the establishment of the first official Portuguese settlement in 1557 until its handover to China in 1999. It comprised the Municipality of Macau and the Municipality of Ilhas. Macau was both the first and last European holding in China.

Macau's history under Portugal can be broadly divided into three distinct political periods. The first was the establishment of the Portuguese settlement in 1557 to 1849. The Portuguese had jurisdiction over the Portuguese community and certain aspects of the territory's administration but no real sovereignty. Next came the colonial period, which scholars generally place from 1849 to 1974. As Macau's importance among other territories grew within the Portuguese Empire, Portuguese sovereignty over Macau strengthened and it became a constitutional part of Portuguese territory. Chinese sovereignty during this era was mainly nominal. Finally, in the aftermath of the 12-3 incident in 1966, the third was the transition period or post-colonial period, after the Carnation Revolution in 1974 until the handover in 1999.

Wu Zhiliang, President of the Macau Foundation, more specifically identified six periods:

- The early relationship between the Chinese and Portuguese (1514–1583)
- The Senado (Senate) period (1583–1783)
- The decline of the Senado (1783–1849)
- The colonial period (1849–1976)
- The district autonomy period (1976–1988)
- The transition period (1988–1999)

Macau was officially known as the Province of Macau (Portuguese: Província de Macau, Chinese: 澳門省) until 1976, and subsequently Territory of Macau (Território de Macau, 澳門地區).

== History ==
In 1277, about 50,000 supporters and some members of the Song dynasty, fleeing the Mongol invaders, arrived in Macau and built several settlements, the largest and most important being in the Mong-Há region in the north of Macau. It is believed that the oldest temple in Macau, the Temple of Kun Iam (Goddess of Mercy), was located in Mong-Há.

During the Ming dynasty, many fishermen from Guangzhou and Fujian settled in Macau and built the Temple of A-Ma.

=== Arrival of the Portuguese ===
The first Portuguese to visit China was Jorge Álvares in 1513, during the Age of Discovery. He erected a padrão with the arms of Portugal in the port of Tamão at the mouth of the Pearl River, near Macau. This visit was followed by the establishment of numerous Portuguese traders in the area, who would erect temporary wooden buildings that would be destroyed when the traders left. The Portuguese were not yet allowed to stay, obtaining only visitor status.

In 1517, Fernão Pires de Andrade, the head of a Portuguese expedition to China, managed to negotiate with the Chinese authorities in Canton for the entry of the Portuguese ambassador Tomé Pires to Beijing and the establishment of a trading post in Tamão. Due to the aggressive attitudes of his brother Simão de Andrade (who built a fortress in Tamão), Tomé Pires was thrown into prison by the Chinese authorities where he died and the Chinese Emperor forbade trade with the Portuguese. The Portuguese were then chased away from Cantonese waters in two successive battles, the 1521 Battle of Tunmen and the 1522 Battle of Xicaowan, marking the end of the Tamão settlement.

Despite this setback, Portuguese traders continued their activity up the coast of China, eventually settling in Shuangyu. In 1548, this community was razed by a Chinese army, dispersing the Portuguese to the Dongshan Peninsula, where Galeote Pereira was captured by the Chinese in 1549. During these battles the Chinese captured weapons from the Portuguese which they then reverse engineered and mass produced in China. These included matchlock arquebuses, which they named bird guns, and breech loading swivel guns which they named Folangji (Frankish) cannons because the Portuguese were known to the Chinese as "Franks" at this time.

The Portuguese later returned to the coast of Guangdong and the islands of Shangchuan and Lampacau to conduct their commercial transactions. They began establishing trade relations with the Chinese from the port of Macau. They presented themselves as Portuguese instead of Franks in the Luso-Chinese agreement (1554) and rented Macau as a trading post from China by paying annual lease of hundreds of silver taels to Ming China.

=== Founding of Macau ===
Macau as a commercial port dates back to 1535 during the Ming dynasty, when local authorities established a custom house, collecting 20,000 taels in annual custom duties. Sources also call this payment a rent or bribe.

In 1554, the custom house was moved to Lampacao, likely due to threats of piracy. At the same time, the merchants Leonel de Sousa and Simão d'Almeida offered bribes to Wang Bo, the vice-commissioner for maritime defense. After a pleasant reception from the Portuguese merchants on their ships, the two sides agreed to a payment of 500 taels per year made personally to Wang Bo in return for allowing the Portuguese to settle in Macau as well as levying the imperial duty of 20 percent on only half their products. However they were asked to leave during the winter, a practice which lasted until 1557. By 1557, they established a permanent settlement.

The Portuguese ambassador Diogo Pereira arrived in 1563 to normalize relations and in 1568, the Portuguese helped the Chinese to fight off a hundred pirate ships, strengthening their position in Macau.

The nature of Wang Bo's business transactions was almost discovered by imperial observers in 1571, but the vice-commissioner obfuscated the payments by identifying them as "ground rent" made to the imperial treasury. Macau's merchant oligarchs continued to bribe their Mandarin overseers and in this way the settlement persisted. The most important incident of bribery occurred in 1582 when the viceroy of Guangdong and Guangxi summoned Macau's chief officials for a meeting. Remembering the fate of Tome Pires decades earlier, Macau's leaders chose an elderly judge and Italian Jesuit to go in their place. The viceroy raged at the Macau representatives, accusing them of conducting governance in contravention of Ming law, and threatened to destroy the colony and evict all Portuguese from Macau. His attitude changed dramatically after the two presented him with 4,000 cruzados worth of presents. In his words: "The foreigners, subjects to the laws of the Empire, may continue to inhabit Macao."

The name of Macau seems to have originated in one of the first places accessed by the Portuguese, the Bay of A-Má ("A-Ma Gao" in Cantonese), named after a local temple of the goddess A-Má. A-Ma Gao would become, Amacao, Macao and, finally, Macau.

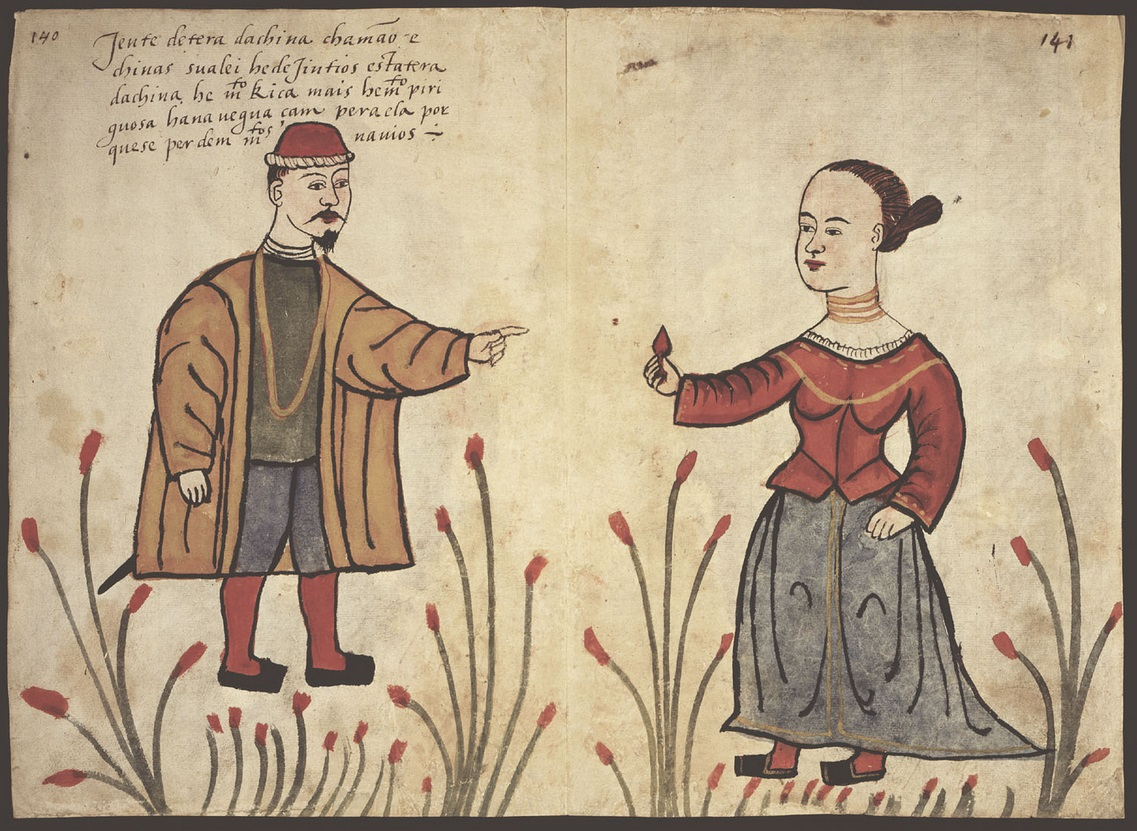
16th century Portuguese watercolour of the Chinese, contained within the Códice Casanatense

At the time, the Portuguese commercial establishment of Macau was only a small village with a few blocks, churches, and residences, joined by a small number of streets. Most of the population lived on trade, so many left Macao for months and sometimes years to carry out their trading. At that time, it had a vaguely defined political-administrative organization, as the Portuguese Crown had not yet properly planned for Macau. Therefore, at that time, the Captain-Major of the Voyage of China and Japan was responsible for the affairs of the Portuguese during his stay in Macau. As the only existing authority, he sought to maintain order among the Portuguese while his great merchant ship was in port.

Over time, issues emerged whose resolution could not wait for the Captain-Major's return from his trips to Japan, so a kind of triumvirate was formed, which began to direct the administration of the establishment. It was composed of three representatives of the residents, called homens-bons ("good men"), chosen by vote. In 1562, one of those elected became, by choice, Land Captain. These three representatives continued to be nevertheless dependent on the Captain-Major. Specifically, the function of these three representatives was to regulate all matters of public order and politics. In addition to the triumvirate, there was also a judge, and four merchants elected by the people who participated in the administration. These elements together formed a kind of council.

Although the Portuguese remained in Macau, the Chinese authorities maintained that Macau was an integral part of the Chinese Celestial Empire, so the Portuguese had been obligated to pay annual rent (about 500 taels of silver) and certain taxes to the Chinese since 1573. The governor of Guangdong, the highest Chinese authority in the region, ordered some mandarins in the vicinity of Macau to watch and supervise the Portuguese commercial establishment, namely with regard to the collection of rent and taxes levied by the Guangzhou authorities on all Chinese products and on all products exported by the Portuguese. These Chinese officials exercised great influence over the administration of Macau and also exercised control and ultimate jurisdiction over all Chinese residents in Macau. Many of them lived in the north of the peninsula.

In 1573 or 1574, the Chinese authorities ordered the construction of a barrier on the northern border of the Peninsula, in a place very close to the present-day Portas do Cerco, to prevent the expansion of the Portuguese through the island of Xiangshan (modern Zhongshan), to supervise better the collection of taxes on goods entering or leaving the city, and to control Macau's supply.

=== Catholic Church in early Portuguese Macau ===
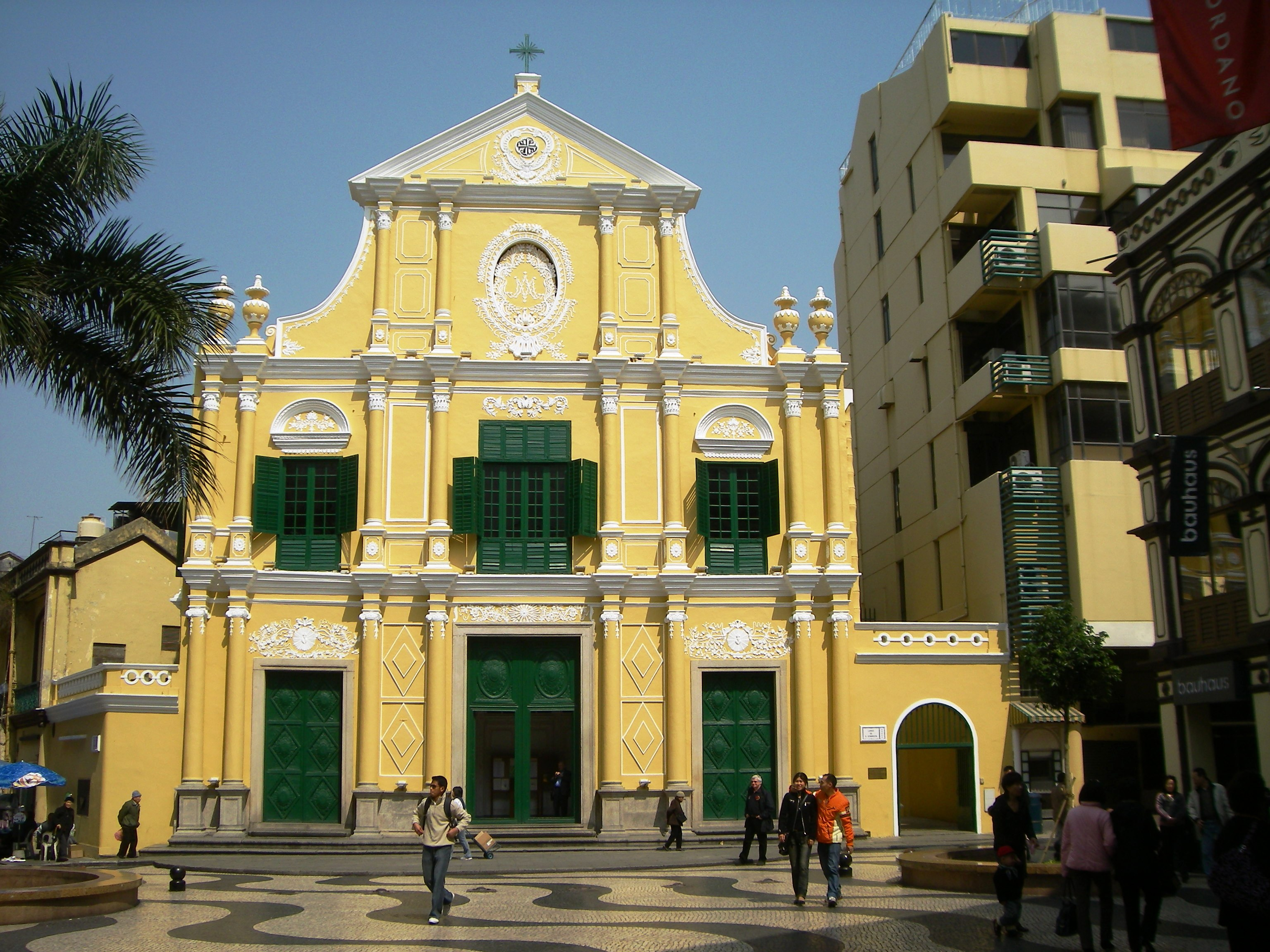
Church of St. Dominic, among Macau's oldest, and where the first modern newspaper in China, A Abelha da China, was published

Macau also became an important point of departure for Catholic missionaries to different countries in Asia, namely China and Japan. In addition to evangelization, these missionaries, especially the Jesuits, also promoted ethical, cultural, and scientific exchange between the West and the East; and contributed in an important way to the development of Macao. Belchior Carneiro Leitão, the first Governor of the Bishopric of Macau, founded, in 1569, the first hospital in Macau, Hospital dos Pobres (later to be called "Hospital de São Rafael"), and the first European institution charity in this region, the Santa Casa da Misericórdia. These religious Catholics also contributed to the development of social assistance, creating orphanages and even a leper colony, and education in Macau.

The Colégio de São Paulo was founded in the 16th century and the Seminary of São José in the 18th century. These two institutions had the function of training missionaries and priests. Due to the great importance of Macau, Pope Gregory XIII created the Diocese of Macau on 23 January 1576. Due to the lack of priestly vocations, the seminary was closed and the College was destroyed by fire in 1835.

On several occasions, the Jesuits who regularly attended the court in Beijing used their influence to save Macau from various dangers and from various exaggerated demands imposed by the Chinese authorities in Guangzhou or by the Emperor himself.

=== Goa-Macau-Nagasaki trade ===
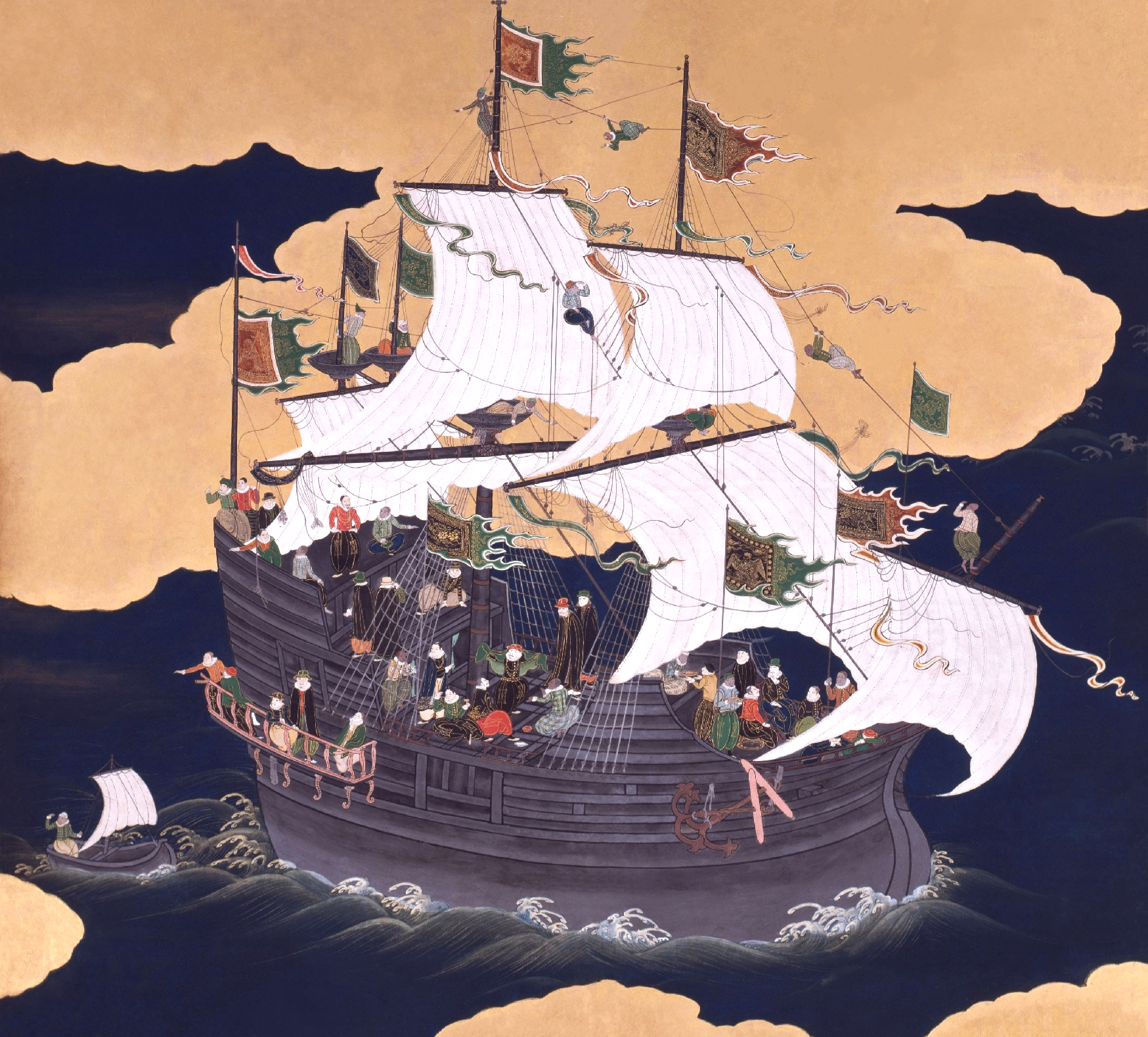
Portuguese carrack depicted in a Japanese lacquer screen

From its founding until the loss of trade with Japan in 1639, Macau survived and prospered due to the China–Macau–Japan triangular trade. This lucrative trade, based on the exchange of silk and gold from China for silver from Japan, began when, in the 1540s, Portuguese merchants began selling Chinese products in Japan. Within a decade, Macau became a key entrepot and intermediary in trade between China and Japan, especially after Chinese authorities banned direct trade with Japan for over a hundred years. In these circumstances, the Portuguese monopolized trade between China, Japan, and Europe.

From 1550 onwards, this commercial monopoly was exercised and ensured by the Captain-Major of the Voyage of China and Japan, who also enjoyed the right to sell his post to others.

=== Macau during the Iberian Union ===
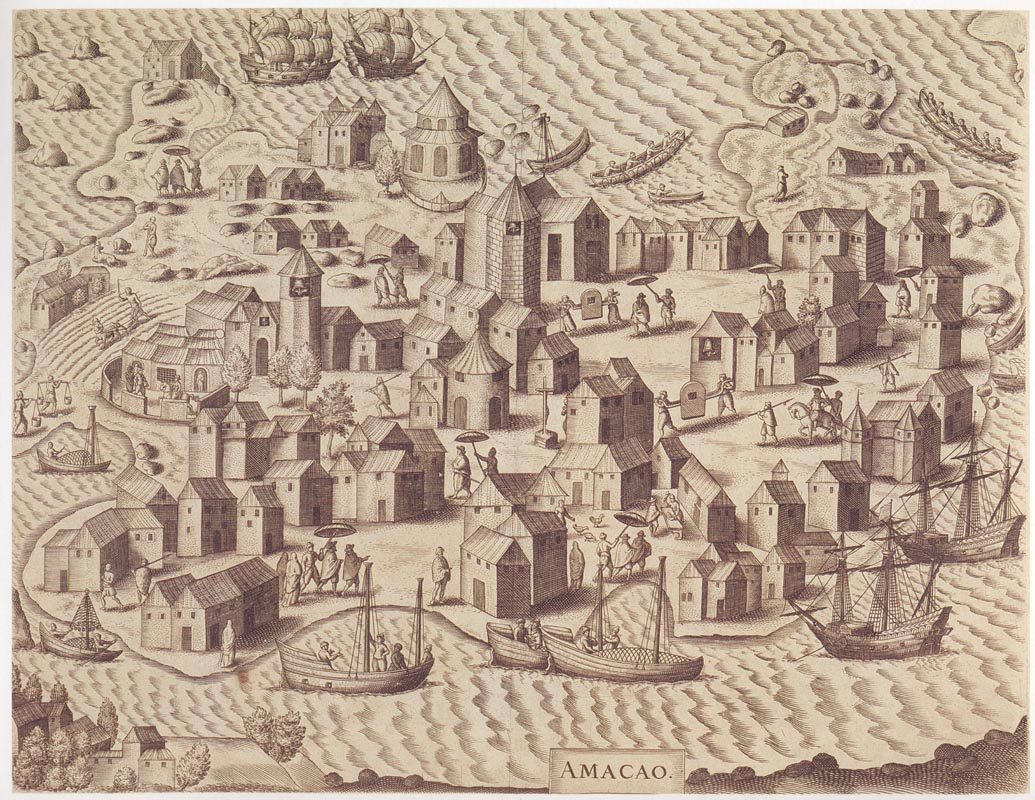
Amacao, by Theodor de Bry, c. 1598

In 1580, the position of ouvidor ("ombudsman") was created. The first magistrate was sent from Lisbon to Macau, under the pretext of putting an end to the rivalries existing in the settlement. In 1581, the residents of Macau learned of the accession of Philip II of Spain to the throne of Portugal, which took place in the year 1580. This news saddened the citizens of Macau because it placed Macau in a dangerous situation, as the Chinese authorities had granted Macau to the Portuguese Crown and not to the Spanish. The Portuguese feared that they would be expelled by the Chinese authorities, losing their monopoly on trade with China. It was mainly for this reason, but also for the patriotic spirit of the Portuguese residents, that the Portuguese flag remained always hoisted during this period.

The new state of affairs in Portugal established a more organized, effective and representative administration. In 1583, on the initiative of the Bishop of Macau, the Senate, a municipal and senatorial body more representative than the oligarchic Junta, was founded to administer Macau better and to maintain Macau's autonomy from the Spanish authorities. The Senate, which feared the interference of Chinese authorities in the administration, the economy (mainly in commerce) or even in the statute or in the very existence of Macau, prepared large sums of gifts for the Chinese authorities, with the intention of trying to distance them from Macao's internal affairs. This situation of subservience on the part of Macau would only be overcome with the measures imposed during the mandate of Governor João Ferreira do Amaral (1846–1849), although Macau continued to depend on China.

Due to the growing prosperity and importance of Macau, this commercial establishment was elevated to the status of city in 1586 or 1587, by decision of King Filipe II of Spain (Filipe I of Portugal), changing its name to Cidade do Santo Nome De Deus de Macao. This Spanish monarch decided not to send a Governor to the city, preferring to keep things as they were.

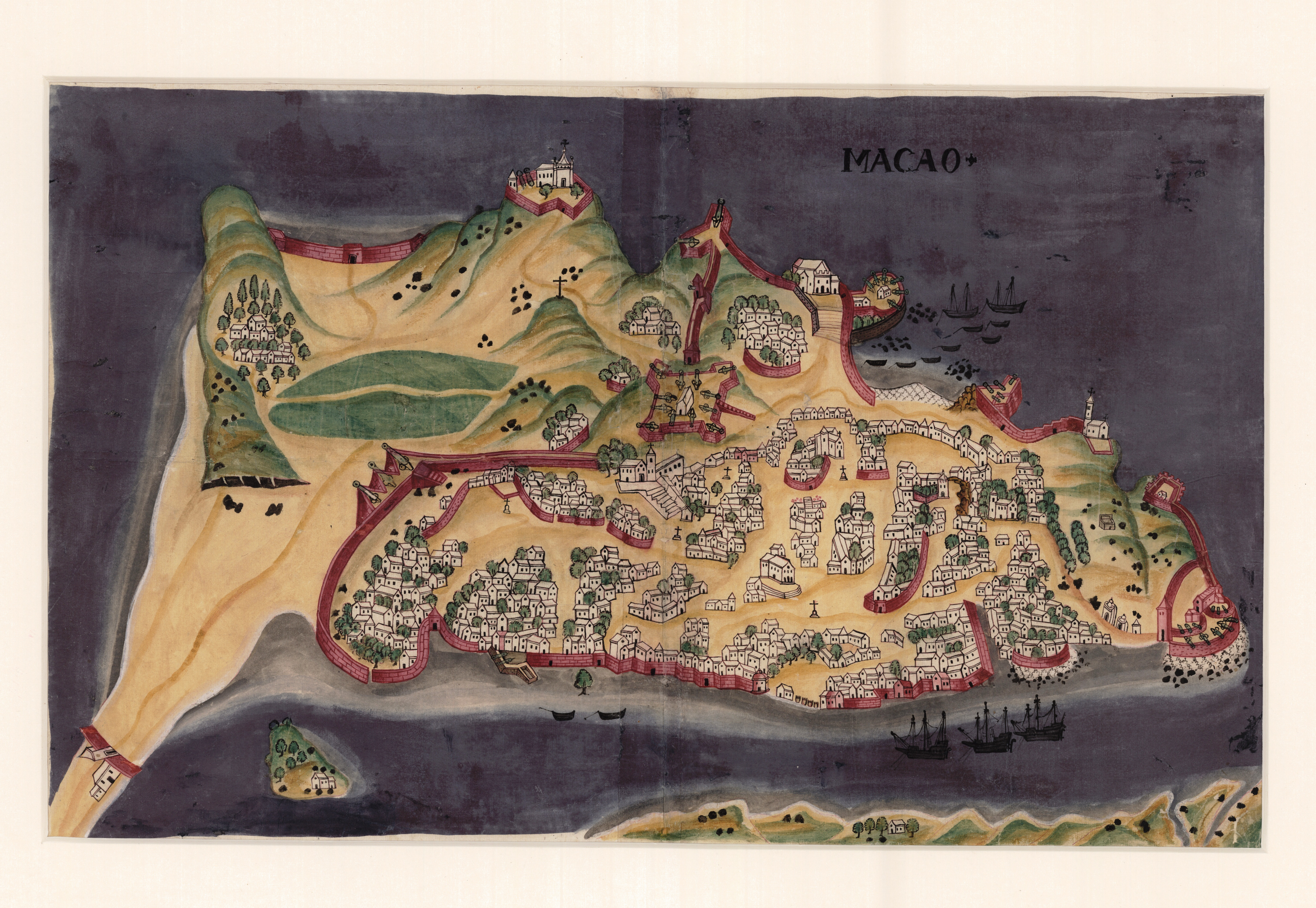
1635 depiction of Macau

It was during the period of Habsburg control of Portugal that Macau reached great prosperity, entering its "golden age". Some historians point to the period between 1595 and 1602 as the height of its "golden age". In this period, Macau became one of the busiest commercial cities in the Far East and served as an entrepot for many Portuguese and Spanish trade routes, mainly for the lucrative route to Japan. At that time, the Portuguese, although increasingly dependent on the capital of the great Chinese and Japanese merchants and also suffering from increasing Dutch competition, had exclusivity on this route because Japan did not allow the entry of other foreign ships. This route, especially when the Dutch began to disturb the routes to Goa and Malacca, became one of the main sources of income for Macau and provided a key support to Portuguese trade in the China Seas.

During this period, the Church of São Paulo and many other architectural works, built mostly according to European-inspired architectural styles, were completed, giving a strong touch of splendor and grandeur to the city.

During this period, the Leal Senado was able to avoid open conflicts with the mandarins, bribing them with significant sums, and compromises with the Spaniards, who wanted to end the commercial monopoly that the Portuguese enjoyed in China (at that time, Portuguese ships, when entering Guangzhou, paid two-thirds less than other ships of the same tonnage).

The Spaniards, based in Manila, even sent embassies to China and Japan, in an attempt to end the privileged position of the Portuguese, but they did not achieve what they sought, partially due to the pro-Portuguese actions of the Jesuits based in those Asian countries. In fact, the Jesuits were at the service of the Portuguese Empire at that time, within the scope of the Portuguese Padroado agreement.

Portuguese-Spanish relations were characterized more by distrust and rivalry than by cooperation and unity. For example, in 1589, the establishment of a Macau–Acapulco trade route greatly angered the Spaniards of Manila. In another example, some Spaniards even wanted the King of Spain (and Portugal) to order the destruction of Macau, transferring the silver and silk trade between Japan and China to Manila; this proposal was not put into practice.

Alongside this, trade between Macau and Manila grew and was gradually regulated, also becoming an important source of income for the City of the Name of God.

=== Attempted Dutch takeover ===
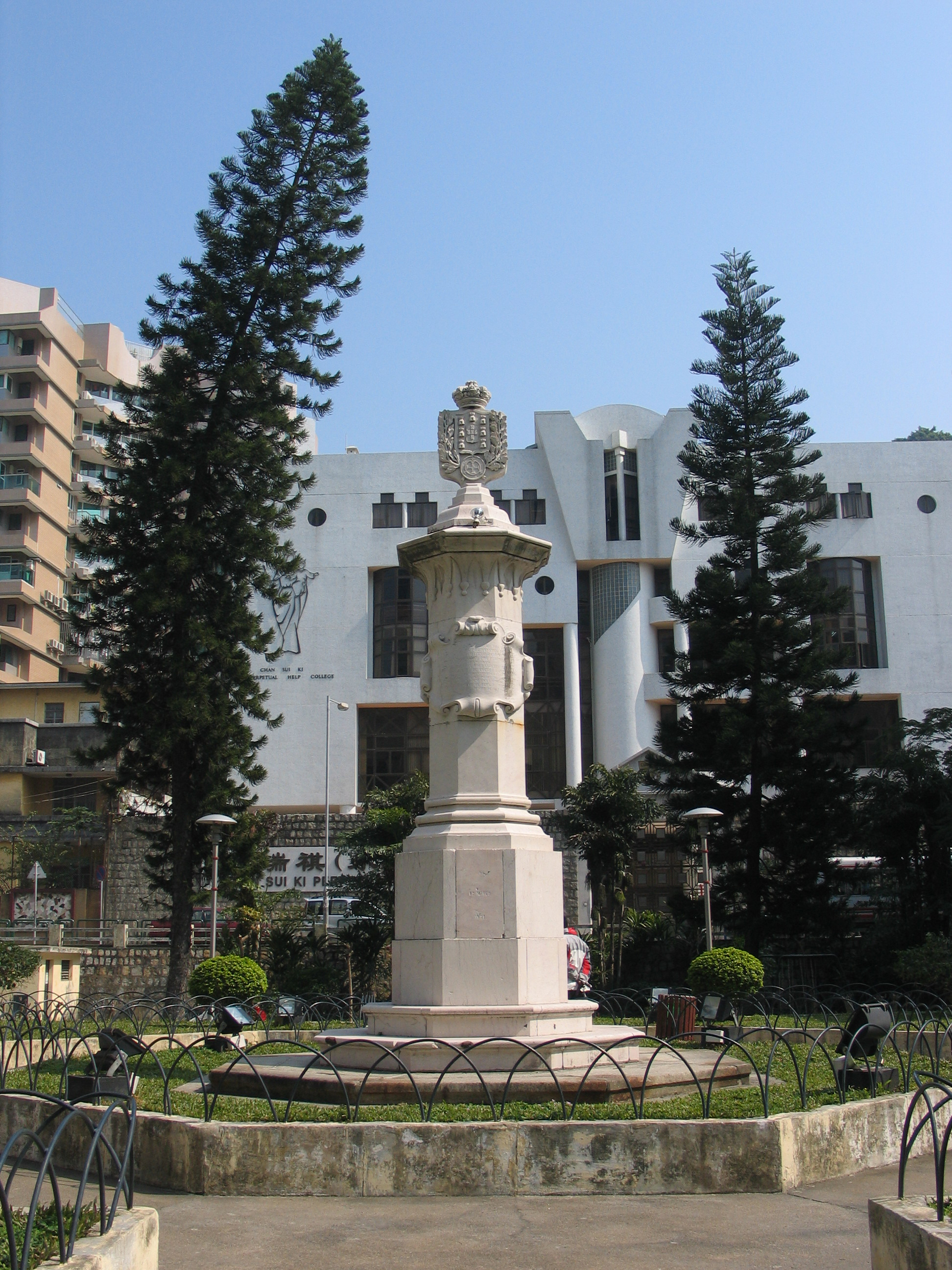
Monument erected on Jardim da Vitória

Having an important strategic position, Macau was attacked several times by the Dutch during the Eighty Years' War.

King Philip III of Spain, who was at war with the Dutch, put an embargo on Dutch trading ships in all his territories including Portugal, so these ships headed east, causing many problems for the Portuguese settled in this region. In 1601, a Dutch fleet led by Admiral Van Neck appeared in Macau. In 1603, warships from Holland bombarded the city; and in the years 1604 and 1607 came, respectively, the expeditions led by Admirals Wybrand van Warwijck and Cornelis Matelieff de Jonge.

These Dutch appearances forced the Portuguese authorities to build a defensive system for the city. But the Chinese authorities through threats prevented the fortification of Macau at all costs, fearing a possible coup against China. In 1614, through a decree, the Emperor sanctioned the construction of fortifications in Macau. The Portuguese managed to build their desired and necessary fortifications, thanks to the magnificent gifts offered to the mandarins in charge of watching the city.

The most famous Dutch invasion took place on 22 June 1622. On the morning of 24 June, 800 soldiers from the invading army landed at Cacilhas beach. They advanced cautiously towards the center of the city, suffering heavy bombardment from cannons at the Fortaleza do Monte. It was then a wagon loaded with gunpowder belonging to the Dutch exploded, whether due to a Jesuit cannon shot or by mishandled gunpowder by the Japanese mercenaries among the Dutch, disconcerting the invading forces. It is also on this day that Macau's small military garrison (consisting of approximately 200 soldiers and a few fortresses, namely Fortaleza do Monte and Fortaleza da Guia) defeated the invading forces. The Dutch, defeated, threw themselves overboard in an attempt to reach the boats. Many drowned and one of the boats, overcrowded, sank. Portuguese records say that a few dozen Portuguese died and that around 350 Dutch died in combat or drowned. For Macau, unprepared, the victory was considered a miracle. After the victory, Macao residents celebrated the 24th of June, Victory Day, as City Day. It is also on this day that Saint John the Baptist, the patron saint of the city, is celebrated. Legend has it that by his cloak, the enemy's shots were deflected, saving the city from the Dutch invaders. This day was a public holiday and celebrated every year until 1999, the date when Macau was transferred to China.

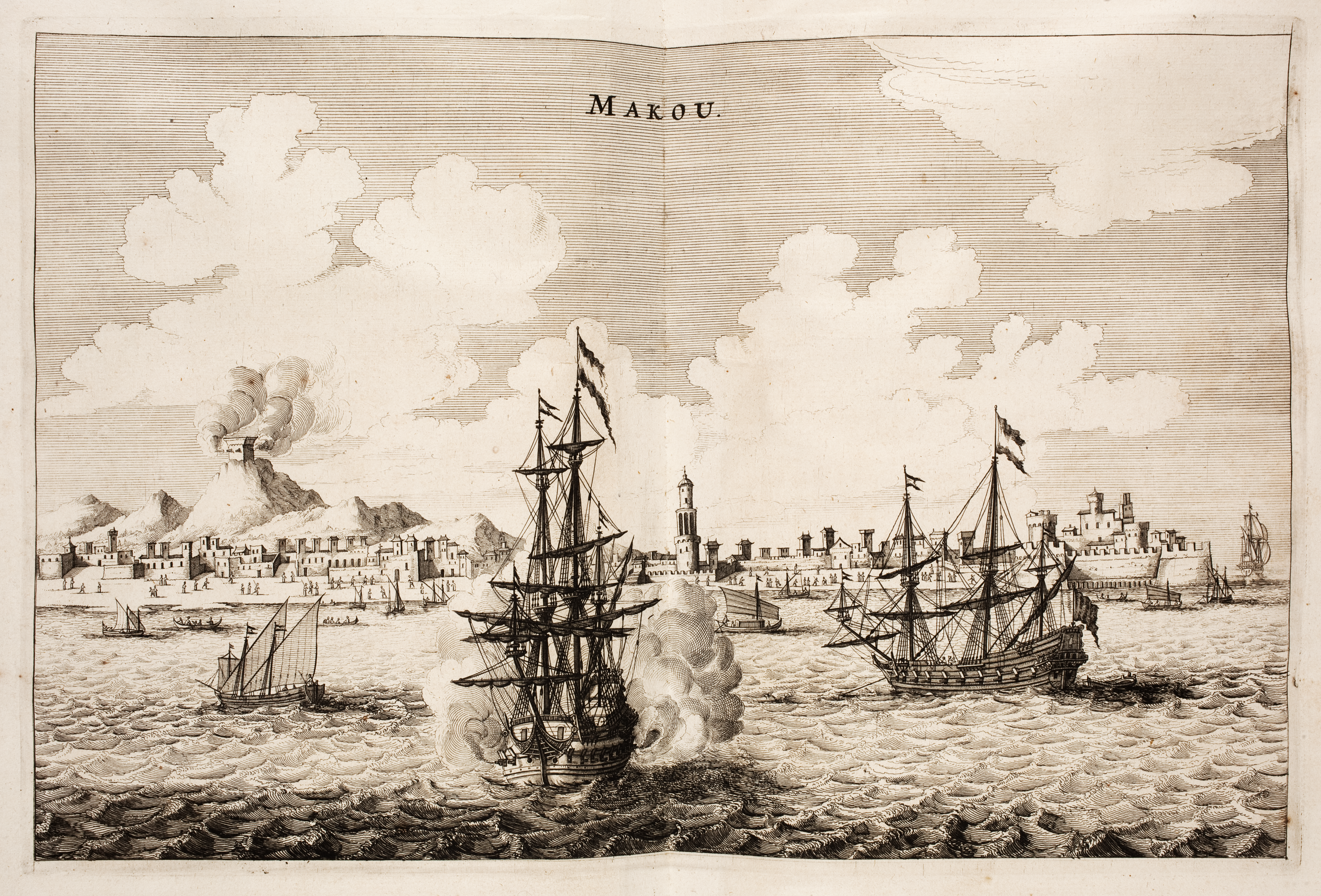
Dutch depiction of Macau and the Battle for Macau in 1622

After this attempted Dutch invasion, the Portuguese authorities, from 1623 onwards, sent a Governor to Macau. The first governor of Macau was Francisco Mascarenhas. Before his arrival, the Senate administered and governed this small town. Macau's small military garrison was also reinforced. These measures revealed a greater concern and participation of the Portuguese authorities in the administration and protection of this distant and small Portuguese establishment. But, even so, the local power, residing in the Senate, continued to maintain a great autonomy in relation to the central metropolitan power of Lisbon, represented in Macau by the Governor, and continued to play a fundamental role in the administration of the city, causing frequent conflicts between the Senate and the Governor.

=== Title awarded by King John IV ===
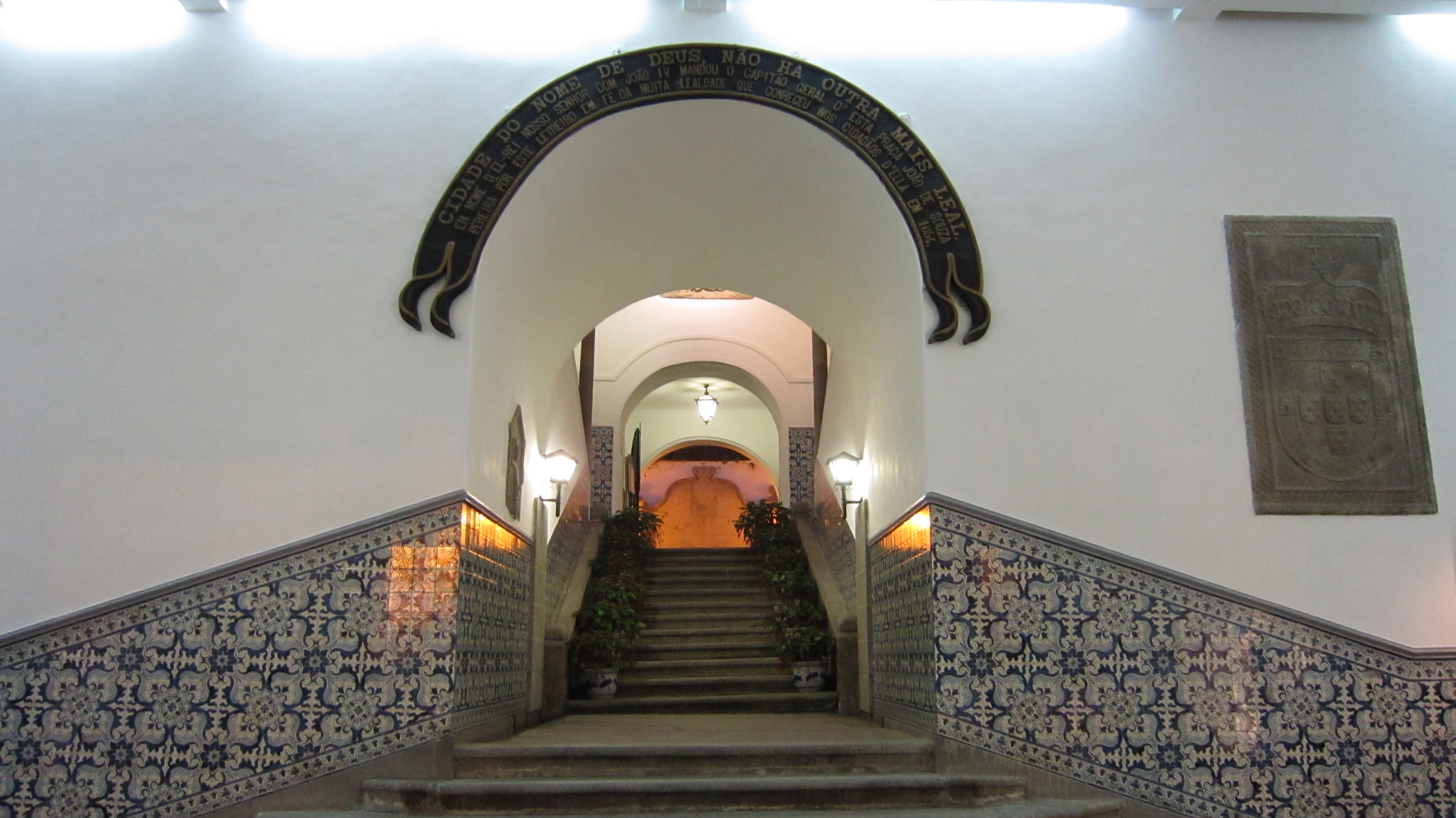
Staircase inside the Leal Senado Building in Macau, with a plaque in which the city's name, title and honours are inscribed, along with Portugal's coat of arms carved in stone

Although Portugal was ruled by a Spanish monarch between 1580 and 1640, Macau continued to loyally hoist the Portuguese flag. Therefore, after the restoration of Portugal's independence and sovereignty in 1640, King John IV of Portugal rewarded this trust and loyalty in 1654, by granting Macau the title "No other is more loyal". Therefore the full name and title of Macau under Portuguese administration would read: "City of the Holy Name of God of Macau – No Other is More Loyal".

=== Competition with European powers ===
From the mid-17th century onwards, Macao's prosperity began to decline, caused by various factors and events. But, even so, this commercial establishment rarely asked for subsidies from its metropolis (Portugal), and even sometimes gave financial aid to other Portuguese territories in the East. When Macau had financial problems, which it did with some frequency, the city would ask for loans from other neighboring countries or from wealthy merchants in the Far East.

The Portuguese commercial system centered in Lisbon began to suffer a growing decline in the 17th century, due to the competition between it and the other systems developed by other European powers, namely England and the Netherlands. These European powers, with large and powerful fleets of merchant and warships, attacked the great but weakened Portuguese Empire, occupying and/or looting its colonies and trading bases and intercepting many of its trade routes. In the end, these emerging powers created, at the expense of the Portuguese Empire, their own empires and secured many markets and trade routes that were once dominated exclusively by the Portuguese.

=== Loss of Malacca and end of trade with Japan and Manila ===
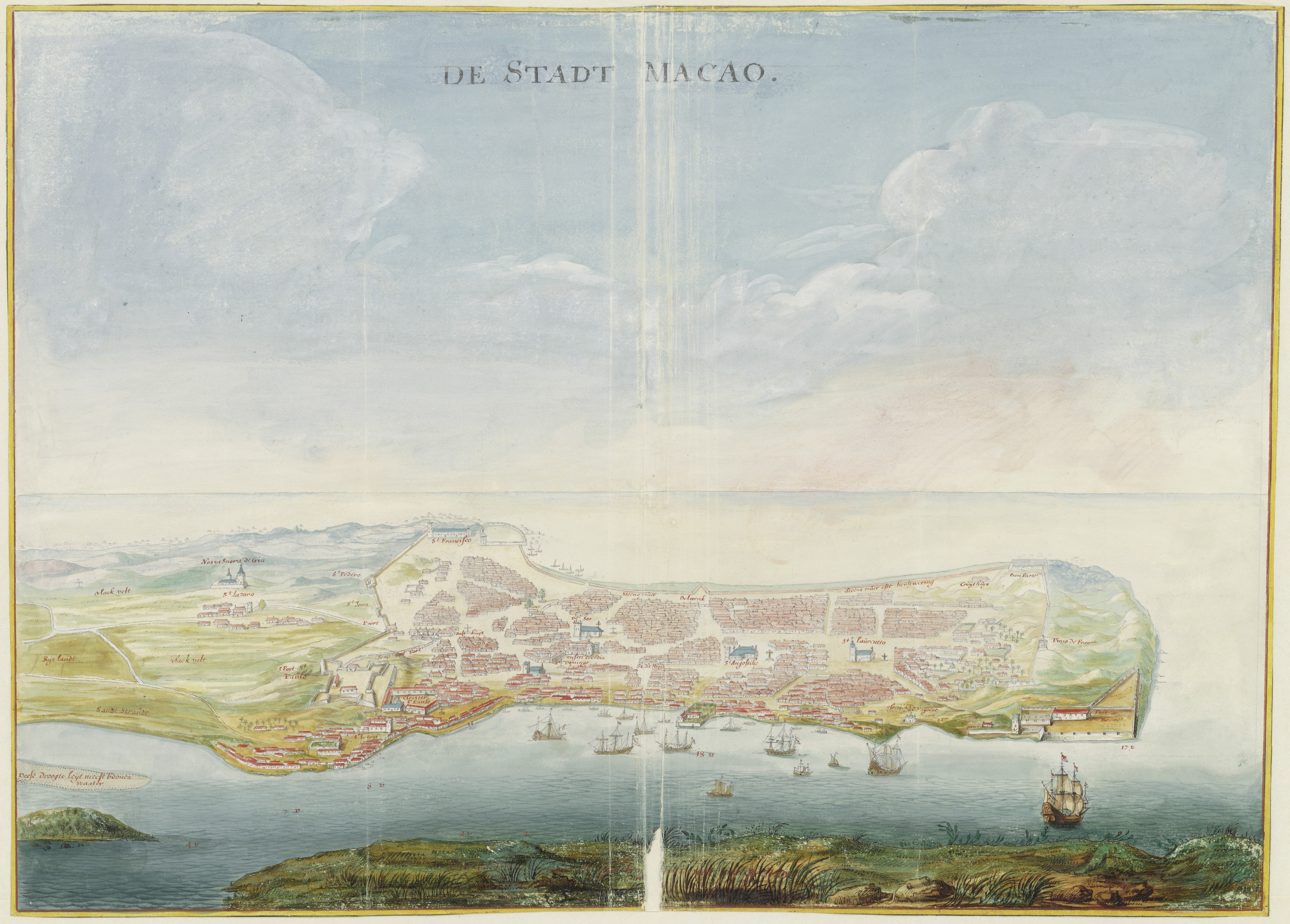
Bird's eye view of Macau, made by the Dutch Johannes Vingboons

The profitable trade with Japan began to undergo gradual changes as early as the end of the 16th century. In 1587, Japanese authorities began to implement measures to expel Catholic missionaries, who had become increasingly powerful and influential in the Kyushu region. This led to their loss of control over Nagasaki. This event, combined with the prohibition of Christianity by the Japanese authorities in 1614, contributed to the fact that Portuguese trade in Japan was conducted with increasing difficulties. In 1636, the Portuguese were transferred from Nagasaki to the secondary trading port of Dejima.

In 1638–1639, the shogun Tokugawa Iemitsu implemented Japan's exclusionary policies, intended to protect it from possible European occupation, and ruthlessly ordered the persecution of all missionaries and priests, and of hundreds of thousands of Japanese Christians. As a result, Portuguese trade with Japan came to an abrupt end, seriously affecting Macau, which quickly went into economic decline. The Dutch also contributed to the end of this lucrative trade, making the Japanese authorities increasingly suspicious of the commercial activity of the Portuguese and especially of the religious activity of Catholic missionaries, accused of being the vanguard of a powerful European and Catholic invading force. With the Portuguese expelled, a small number of Dutch, who gained the trust of the Japanese authorities, were able to visit the port of Dejima, although with many restrictions, becoming the only Europeans who were allowed to trade with Japan.

In 1640, in an attempt to reestablish the profitable and important trade, the Portuguese residents of Macau decided to send an embassy to Japan. However, not only did they not get what they wanted, but the members of the embassy were all executed by order of the powerful Tokugawa shogun.

In 1641, another event affected Macau's declining economy: the Portuguese lost Malacca to the Dutch, who had already captured several Portuguese possessions, areas of influence and trade routes. The loss of this important city and commercial base caused disturbances and deviations from the usual route between Macau and Goa and a decrease in the supply of tradable products with China.

In 1640, when the Crowns of Portugal and Spain were once again separated, trade with Manila and with the Spaniards based there ended, causing more economic and financial problems for Macau. It was only with the end of the Portuguese-Spanish rivalry that trade was reactivated.

=== Growing instability in China ===
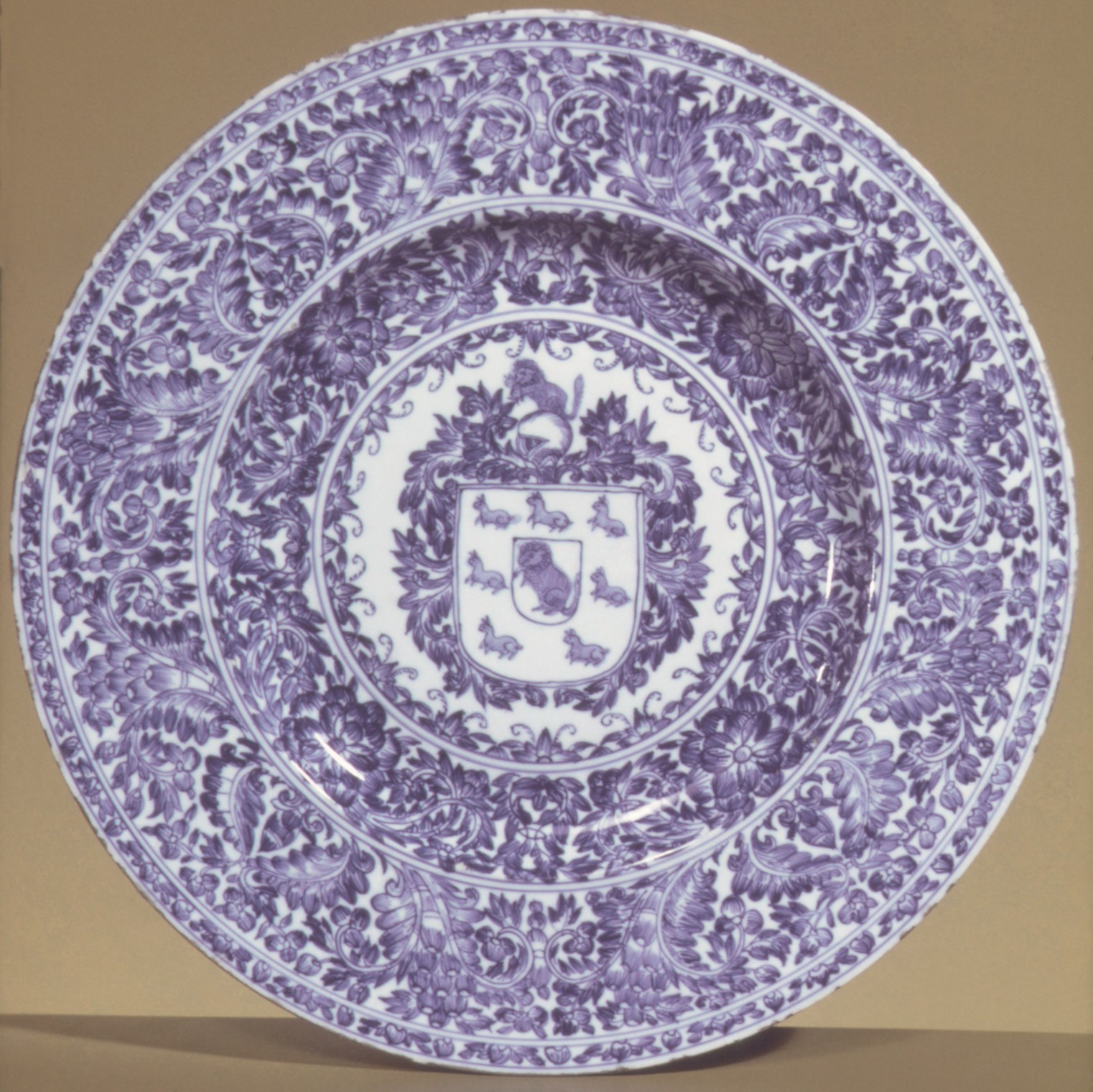
Qing dynasty porcelain plate for the Portuguese market

The loss of several commercial markets, although very harmful to Macau, was not fatal for the merchants and inhabitants of the city. The transition from the Chinese Ming dynasty to the Manchu Qing dynasty, which lasted several years, caused strong instability in the Chinese Empire and made the internal markets of China and all of Southeast Asia uncertain, fatally affecting the commercial activity of the residents of Macau. In addition to living in uncertainty and fear of being destroyed or occupied by the forces of the new imperial dynasty, the city was also flooded in the 1640s with refugees fleeing the Qings, depleting Macao's resources and giving rise to famine in the 1640s, also due to the dwindling and unstable food supply from Chinese merchants.

It was only with the re-establishment of imperial peace in southeastern China that Macau's trade prospered again. The Portuguese, not wanting Macau's status to be changed by the new imperial Qing dynasty and not wanting their privileged position to end, sent several embassies to Beijing, establishing friendly diplomatic relations with China's new sovereigns.

=== The end of the Portuguese monopoly on trade with China ===
In 1685, despite successive Portuguese embassies to Beijing, the Portuguese monopoly on trade with China came to an end because the Chinese Emperor authorized trade with all foreign countries in Canton, at least once a year during the annual fair. This ended the privileged position of the Portuguese in trade with the Chinese Empire, as the only and exclusive intermediaries in the China-Europe trade.

From that date onwards, Macau ceased to be the exclusive entrepôt for Chinese trade, thus altering Macau's economic role in trade with China. However, European merchants of other nationalities, who were also able to participate in direct trade with China along with the Portuguese, also started to temporarily visit and use Macau as a trading post and intermediary in this lucrative trade. This is because, at that time, foreigners could not reside and move freely in Guangzhou, and they had to reside in Macau for most of the year.

With the sudden increase in foreign competition in trade with China and the decline of the Portuguese trading system, merchants based in Macau, in order to continue with their commercial activities and with their profits, had to cooperate more frequently with the merchants of the new and emerging European powers, because it was these powers that held control of world trade centered on Europe. This cooperation at times generated a certain dependence on the part of Macanese merchants on these new western powers.

=== The rise of intra-Asian trade (17th–18th centuries) ===
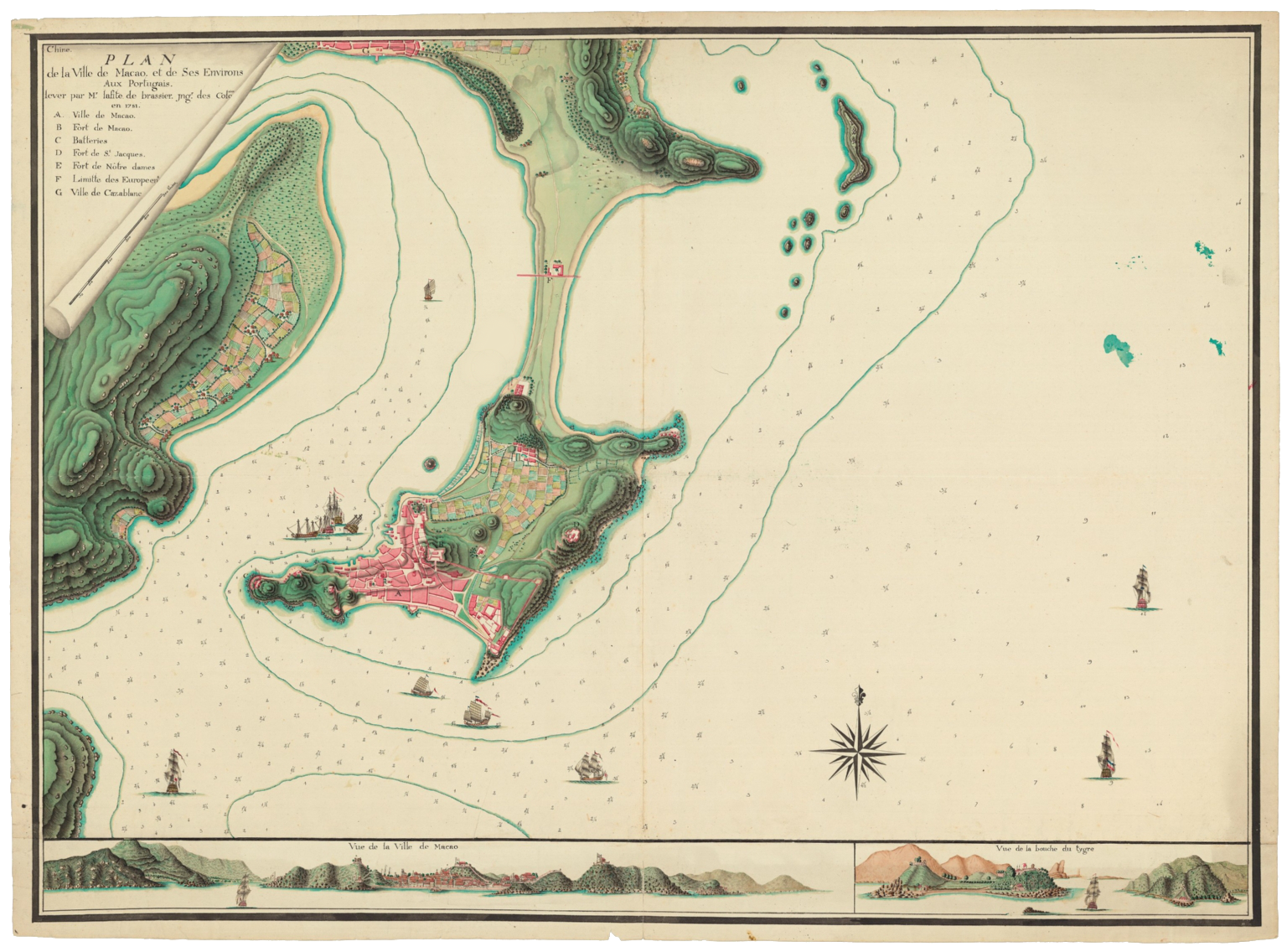
Highly detailed 18th century French map of Macau

With the loss of trade with Japan, Manila and other locations that were once Portuguese possessions and with the rise of Dutch and later English merchants in the eastern seas, Portuguese traders based in Macau made several adjustments to their trade routes.

Knowing the process of decline of the Portuguese world trading system and the lack of resources on the part of Portugal to sustain an intense long-distance trade (that is, commercial voyages from the East to Europe), Macanese merchants bet heavily on intra-Asian trade, while long-distance trade was mostly dominated by the new European powers, such as the Netherlands and England.

These Macau-based traders invested, in addition to Goa and China, in several Asian regional markets, such as Macassar, Solor, Flores, Timor, Vietnam, Siam, Bengal, Calcutta, Banjarmasin, and Batavia.

Over time, the diverse and almost constant adaptations to the changing political and economic realities of the different Asian regional markets bore fruit. In the 18th century, intra-Asian trade became sufficient to create a new and true proto-capitalist class of entrepreneurs, both Portuguese and Chinese, based in Macau. This emerging class specifically included Chinese buyers and the main shipowners and trade captains who accepted the high risk of sailing in the eastern seas and who knew how to adapt to the new realities of the region.

But even so, this intra-Asian trade never managed to restore the prosperity experienced in Macau that was provided by trade with Japan. Often, mainly due to the policies of the Chinese authorities that were unfavorable to the interests of the Portuguese in Macau, such as the opening of certain Chinese ports to international trade, this intra-Asian trade was unable to fully contribute to the subsistence of the territory. Macanese authorities often had to ask for large loans from other neighboring countries or from wealthy merchants in the Far East.

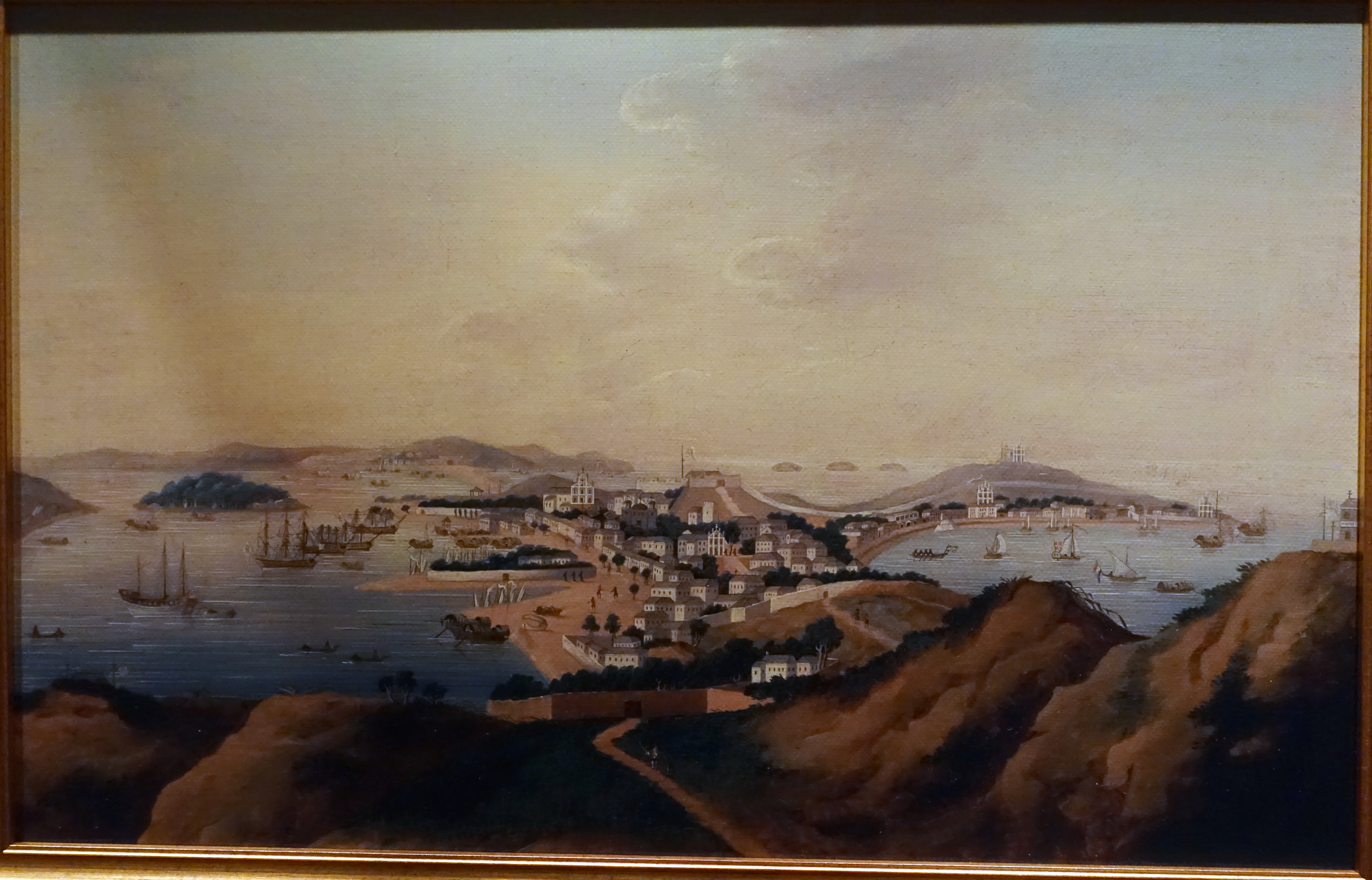
View of Macau from Penha Hill in the 18th century

- The Solor–Timor–Macau trade, based essentially on the supply of the valuable and much sought after sandalwood to Chinese markets, prospered in the 16th century, when trade with Japan was already conducted with many and great difficulties. This aromatic wood, much sought after in China, was transported from Timor and Solor to Macau, where it was later sold in Canton. This trade, although under great danger and intense pressure from the powerful Dutch, made huge profits, which could be above 100% to 150%. Therefore, in that difficult period for Macau, the sandalwood trade became one of the main sources of income for the authorities of the City of the Holy Name of God. But with the fortress of Solor besieged in 1636 by the Dutch, the merchant ships from Macau that participated in the profitable sandalwood trade began to head only to Timor, still under the jurisdiction of Goa. This island supplied slaves, honey and horses, as well as sandalwood. But in the mid-18th century, Macau, which was Timor's main trading partner, abandoned trade with this island, mainly due to interminable internal revolts. Trade with Timor was only reactivated with the pacification of the island.
- Macau–Macassar trade, while not as profitable as the sandalwood trade, relied on Macassar's spice trade in exchange for Chinese roots and cotton goods. This trade prospered after the fall of Malacca in 1641 and, according to Charles Ralph Boxer, grew to such an extent that it threatened the Dutch spice trade in the East. But with Macassar attacked and captured by a Dutch fleet in the 1660s, this trade had to end. With the end of the Portuguese-Dutch rivalry, trade was reactivated.
- The Vietnam–Macao trade: Even before the decline of Portuguese trade with Japan, Portuguese traders were already making commercial trips to Tonkin and Cochinchina (now Vietnam), although these had been considered as operations of secondary importance that served mainly to support the Jesuit mission. But due to the Jesuit influence in the royal courts of these countries, trade was stimulated, mainly in the exchange of silver for Chinese silk. It was only with wars and political instability in Vietnam in the late 18th century that trade ceased.
- The Batavia-Macau trade: In the late 17th century, with the Portuguese-Dutch rivalry over for some time, Portuguese traders, lacking markets, began to cooperate with the Dutch East India Company, trading with Batavia (located in Java). At that time, commercial activity with this Dutch colony was mainly based on the shipment of blue and white porcelain produced in southern China by Portuguese and Chinese merchants from Macau. Trade with Batavia intensified particularly in the period from 1717 to 1727, when the Chinese authorities banned foreign trade. The Dutch, who used to buy Chinese tea in Canton, now did so exclusively in Macau. During this period, tea was transported by Chinese merchants to Macau by reeds.
- The Banjarmasi–-Macau trade, based on the transport of pepper to Macao from Borneo, prospered for a short time in the late 17th century, but also ended abruptly two years after the trade started, due to an attempted massacre of the Portuguese.
- In the late 18th century, Macao traders also began to participate in the opium trade between Bengal and China. They also engaged heavily in trade with Calcutta, where Portuguese traders traded spices, cotton, and opium, in exchange for Chinese silk, tea, and porcelain. This intense commercial activity with these colonies of the British Empire was not a competition between the merchants based in Macau and the English East India Company. On the contrary, they cooperated with this powerful English commercial company to obtain the desired profits.

=== Influence of the Chinese on Macau ===
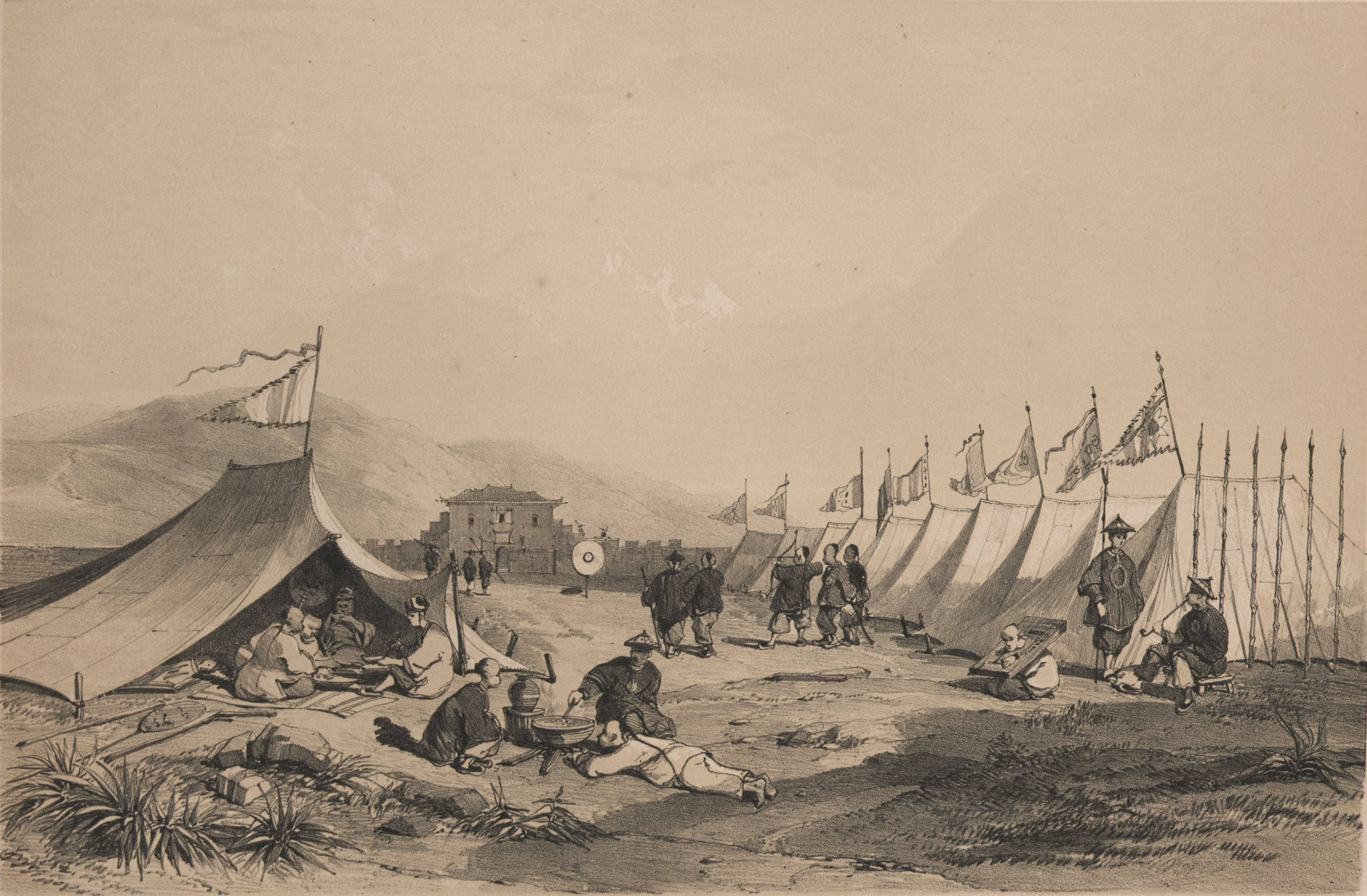
Chinese troops by the Barrier Gate

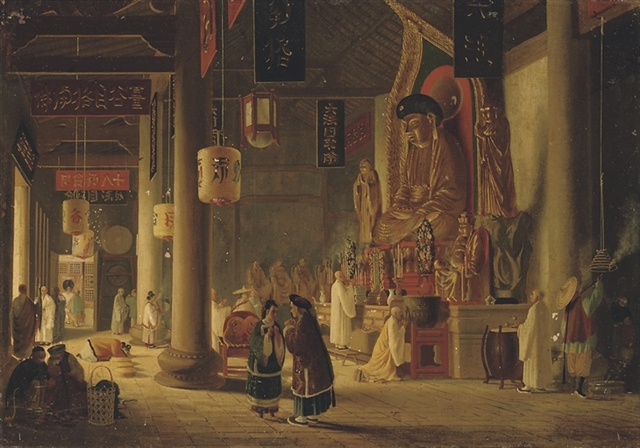
Interior of the A-Ma Temple

In addition to Chinese taxes, the rent, the Portas do Cerco, the special status of the Chinese of being judged, in the last instance, by the mandarins, according to the law of the Chinese Empire, and the increasing Chinese supervision over Macau, the Chinese authorities also imposed a ban, except in exceptional cases, on the construction of dwellings by the Portuguese beyond the walls of the City of Macau. Since they could not expand the city to the north of the Macau Peninsula, and the city could not have a very significant population increase. Furthermore, they also required that the construction of new houses and fortifications within the City had to be previously authorized by the mandarins in charge of guarding the city.

The Chinese authorities even ordered, in 1648, the establishment of a military post with 500 soldiers in the village of Qianshan (which the Portuguese called Casa Branca), very close to Portas do Cerco, to guard the "City of the Holy Name of God of Macau". This village was also the home of one of the mandarins in charge of supervising Macau.

On several occasions, the impositions and decisions by the Chinese authorities to sanction Macau caused a large exodus of the Chinese community from Macau. For this reason, during the first centuries of Macau's existence, the number of the Chinese population was uncertain and fluctuated considerably. These impositions and requirements, sometimes very abusive, sometimes brought real financial crises to the Macao authorities.

The restrictions and impositions by the Chinese authorities began to intensify more and more when the Qing became the rulers of China, as they were always suspicious of foreign actions and influence.

Three years after the opening of the port of Guangzhou to all foreign merchants, in 1688, the Chinese authorities established a Chinese customs house, the "Ho-pu", supervised by a mandarin to better oversee the collection of taxes on certain goods transported by merchant ships anchored in the port of Macau and above all to control the access of foreign ships long-distance to Canton. The Ho-pu became the symbol of Chinese authority, power and influence in Macau.

In 1736, the Chinese authorities imposed a local mandarin in Macau with the name "tchó-t'óng" (or Tso-tang), under the pretext of helping the mandarins in charge of supervising Macau and of better dealing with the affairs of the Chinese inhabitants of the city. This mandarin, residing in the north of the Macau Peninsula, only began to exercise full authority from 1797 onwards.

The power of the mandarins over Macau would be drastically reduced only in the 19th century, during the mandate of Macau Governor João Ferreira do Amaral.

=== Macau as a European outpost in China ===
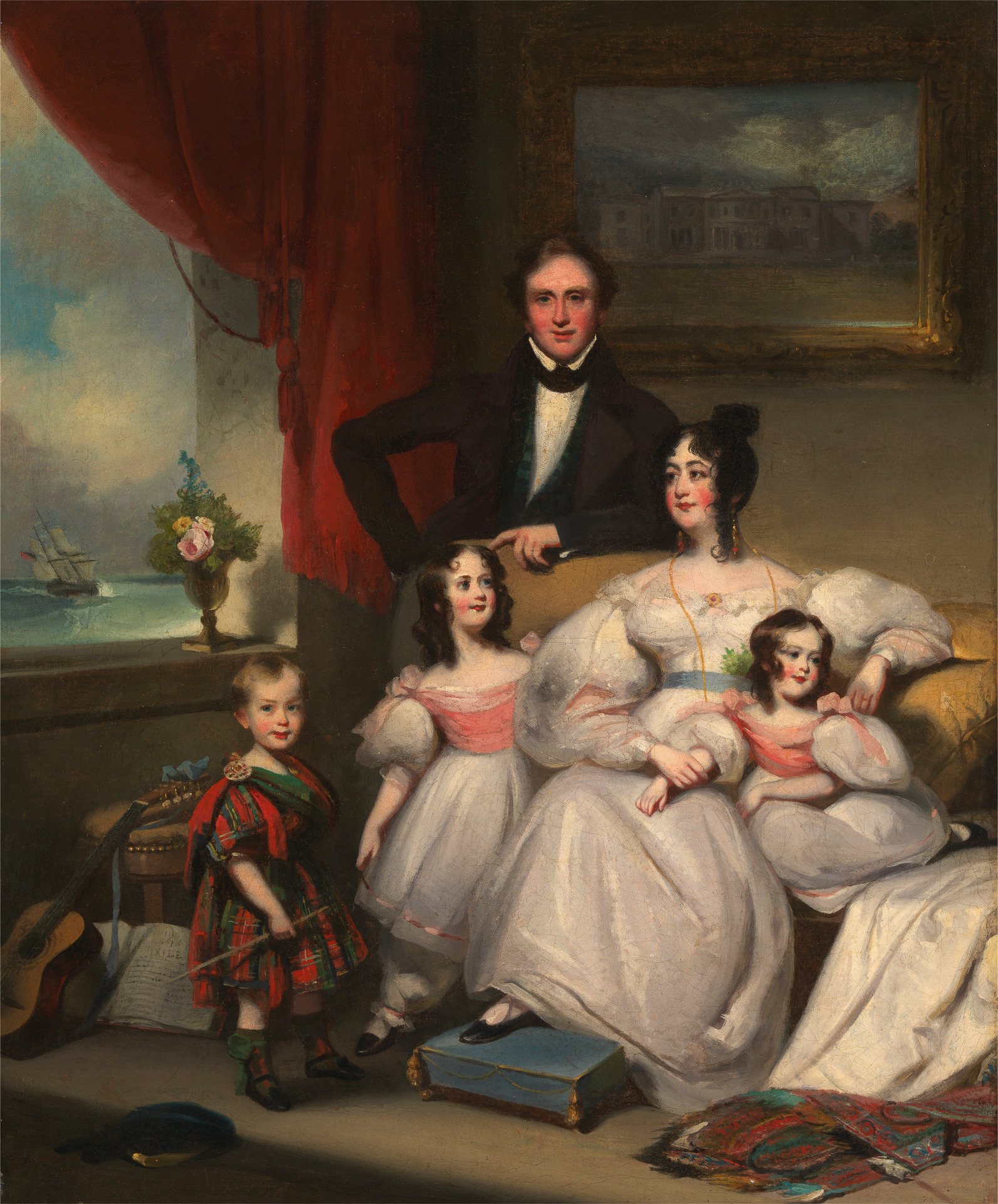
English family of Macau, painted by George Chinnery

Europeans, such as the British, Dutch, French, Spanish, Danish and Swedes, who had been involved in trade with China for some time, began to form small but wealthy communities in Macau, due to the lifting of restrictions on trade and residence to foreigners by the Macau authorities in the year 1760. After the exemptions, Macau emerged as the mandatory residence or intermediate stop for all foreigners participating in trade with China through Canton. This caused many European commercial companies to establish themselves in Macau, increasing the city's revenue. In conclusion, Macau thus became Europe's outpost in China. The city prospered with this status and this is also reflected in its urban landscape: new and sometimes exquisite buildings, built according to European-inspired architectural styles, began to appear in Macau, namely in Praia Grande. These buildings included the residences of wealthy merchants and European aristocracy.

In fact, at this time, the Macanese authorities, which formerly depended mainly on taxes paid by Portuguese traders, now also depended on taxes paid by these wealthy European merchants. To further increase these revenues, the Macanese authorities, in 1784, also created their own customs system, charging customs duties on imported goods and on the anchoring of ships. But most of the revenue from this new customs system was sent directly to Portugal's state coffers.

=== The balance of power between the Governor and the Loyal Senate ===
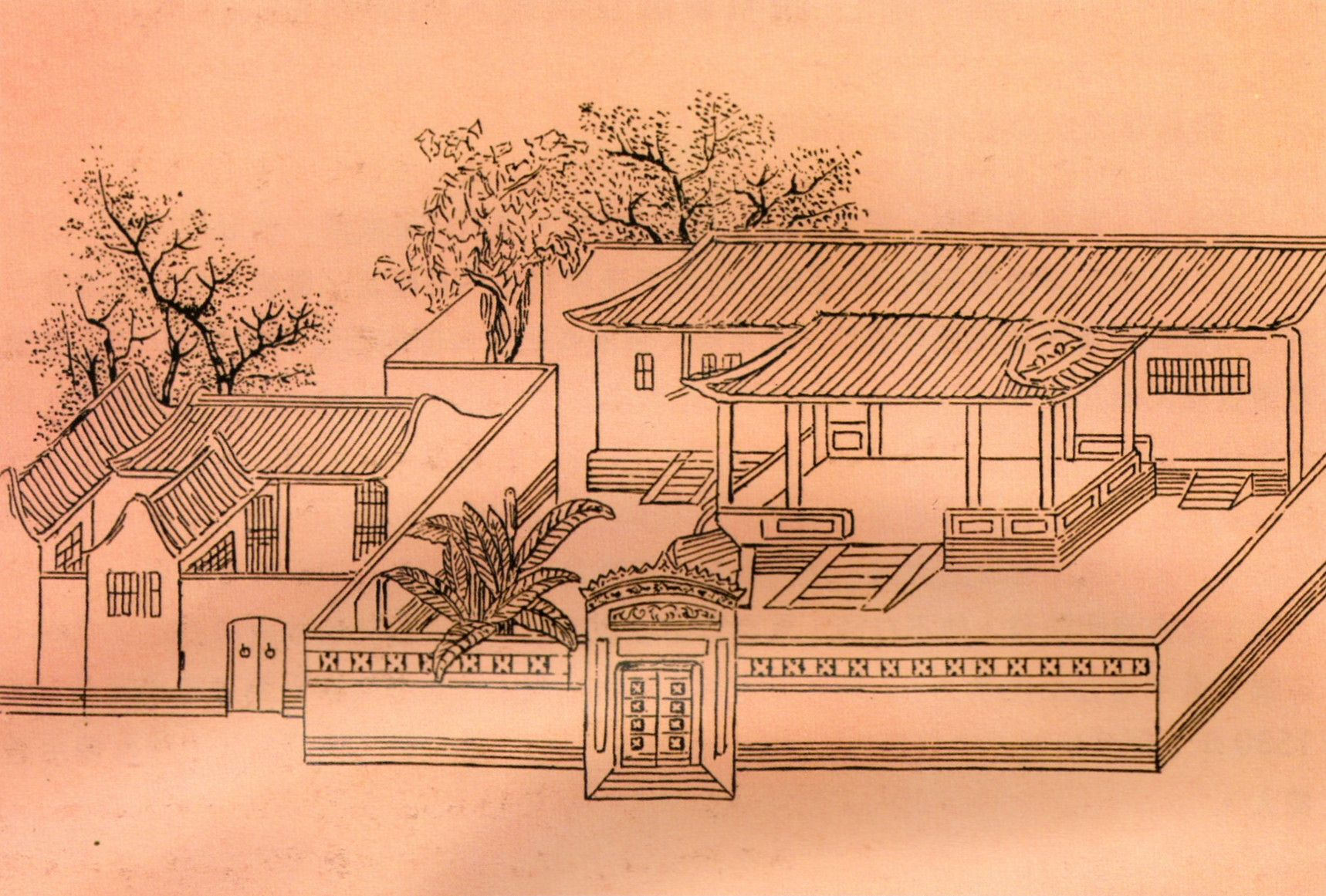
18th century depiction of the senate of Macau

The Leal Senado, symbol of authority and local power, enjoyed great autonomy from the governments of Lisbon and Goa and was Macau's most important governing body for more than two centuries, from its foundation until 1783. Already having suffered a significant decrease due to the increasing and abusive restrictions and impositions of the Chinese authorities, the internal reform carried out during the reign of Queen Maria I of Portugal restricted the powers and especially the autonomy of the Senate.

In 1783, through royal measures, the Queen granted the Governor of Macau fundamental powers and the right of veto over the decisions of the Senate. The governor had the obligation and responsibility to veto all decisions that were contrary to regulations, laws or orders from Lisbon or Goa. The measures dictated that the governor, with his powers already expanded and fortified, had to intervene in all matters related to the administration and government of Macau. Prior to the enactment of these measures, the governor was only the commander of the Portuguese military forces in Macau and did not participate much, with a few exceptions, in the administration of the city.

If, by chance, these two governing bodies could not reach agreement on a matter, and if the case was urgent, the Bishop of Macau and (Portuguese) citizens with the right to vote were to meet and resolve by a majority of votes. In conclusion, from 1783 onwards, the power between the governor and the Loyal Senate reached an equilibrium.

=== Peninsular War and Battle of the Bocca Tigris ===
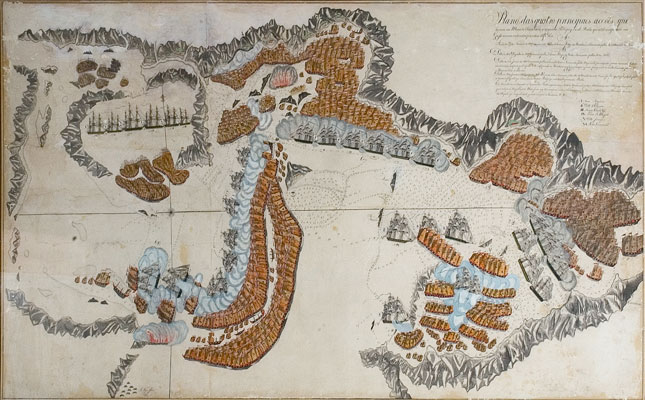
19th century Portuguese depiction of the Battle of the Tigers Mouth

During the Peninsular War (1807–1814), in September 1808 Macau was occupied by troops from the expeditionary force under the command of Rear Admiral William O'Brien Drury, commander-in-chief of the British Naval Forces in the seas of Asia, under the pretext of protection against the French threat. This contingent was re-embarked at the end of the same year, due to the concentration of around 80,000 men of the Chinese army in front of the city gates.

In 1809, the famous naval battle of the Tiger's Mouth (or Bocca Tigris) took place between a Portuguese flotilla of six ships and the Guangdong Pirate Confederation, with more than 300 ships. The Portuguese flotilla, outnumbered but with superior firepower provided by the artillery, emerged victorious and managed to maintain Portuguese rule in Macau, which at that time was seriously threatened by these pirates, who frequently attacked local merchant ships.

=== The rise of Hong Kong and the loss of Macau's economic importance ===
The prosperity and importance of the port of Macau was drastically reduced after the First Opium War in 1841, when Hong Kong became the most important Western port in China. The vast majority of the members of the non-Portuguese European communities and even a group of Macanese and Portuguese, as well as the vast majority of European trading companies, seeing a good part of the trade carried out in Macau being transferred to Hong Kong, quickly abandoned the city and took up residence in the new and prosperous British colony, located 60 km from Macau.

Although Macau continued to house a class of merchants and buyers (mostly Chinese) and although commerce never ceased to exist in the City, Macau was no longer the outpost of Europe in China, and was relegated to a secondary economic and commercial level.

=== Portuguese authority consolidated ===
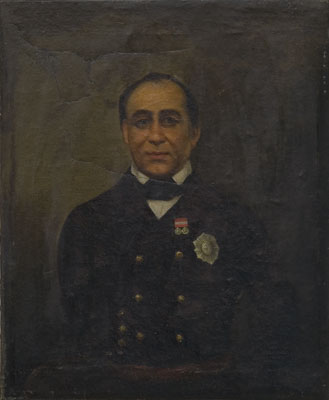
Portuguese Governor João Maria Ferreira do Amaral

In the 19th century, Portugal, seeing the already evident weakness of the Chinese Empire and growing British influence threatening the balance of the region, finally began to worry about strengthening Portuguese sovereignty in Macau and the definition of the political-administrative structures of the city to prevent Macau from falling into the hands of other European powers. This desire of Portugal was fulfilled on 20 September 1844, with the promulgation of a royal decree signed by Queen Maria II of Portugal. This document reaffirmed that the governor was the main political-administrative body of the city and not the Leal Senado, officially putting an end to local authority and hopes that the Senate would regain the status and prestige it had lost in 1834, and Macau finally joined the administrative organization of the Portuguese overseas territory, becoming an overseas province jointly with Timor and Solor, headquartered in Macau and with the name of "Province of Macau, Timor and Solor". Prior to this entry, Macau had been part of the Portuguese State of India.

After the Royal Decree of 1844, Portugal declared the City a free port in 1845, through a royal decree that would later be implemented by Governor João Ferreira do Amaral, appointed in 1846 with a mandate to assert Portuguese sovereignty. He began his term in office in 1846, ordering an end to the payment of annual rent and Chinese taxes and, seeing the impossibility of collecting taxes and customs duties (the colony's biggest revenue) because Macau was already a free port, he ordered the introduction of new taxes on the inhabitants of the City, including the Chinese, and on Chinese light boats, the faitiãos. This led to a Chinese revolt which was put down by the Portuguese military.

The Governor even ordered the construction of a road to connect the walled city of Macau in the south of the peninsula, to the "Portas do Cerco", a border post located in the extreme north that separates the Macau Peninsula from continental China.

Amaral also ordered the expulsion of the mandarins from Macau and, because Macau was a free port (that is, a port without customs), he finally could order the abolition, in 1849, of the famous Ho-pu (Chinese customs), thus culminating the process of strengthening Portuguese sovereignty. From that date onwards, the Macau Government also began to exercise ultimate jurisdiction over all Chinese residents of Macau City and to levy taxes on them, ending their special status. In the implementation of the royal decree of 1845, the Portuguese customs also ceased to exist.

The Senate opposed his actions, stating that establishing full control by force was an "unfair and disloyal gesture". Amaral dissolved the Senate and called them unpatriotic. He told Chinese officials that they would be received as representatives of a foreign power.

After the events of 1783, of 1834, of 1844, the definitive shake-up of the mandarins' power over Macau, and the abolition of Chinese customs in 1849, the Governor of Macau, free from local and Chinese authorities, became Macau's highest authority.

Amaral's policies evoked much resentment, and he was assassinated by Chinese men on 22 August 1849. This led the Portuguese to capture the Passaleão fort beyond the Barrier Gate three days later.

=== The Passaleão ===
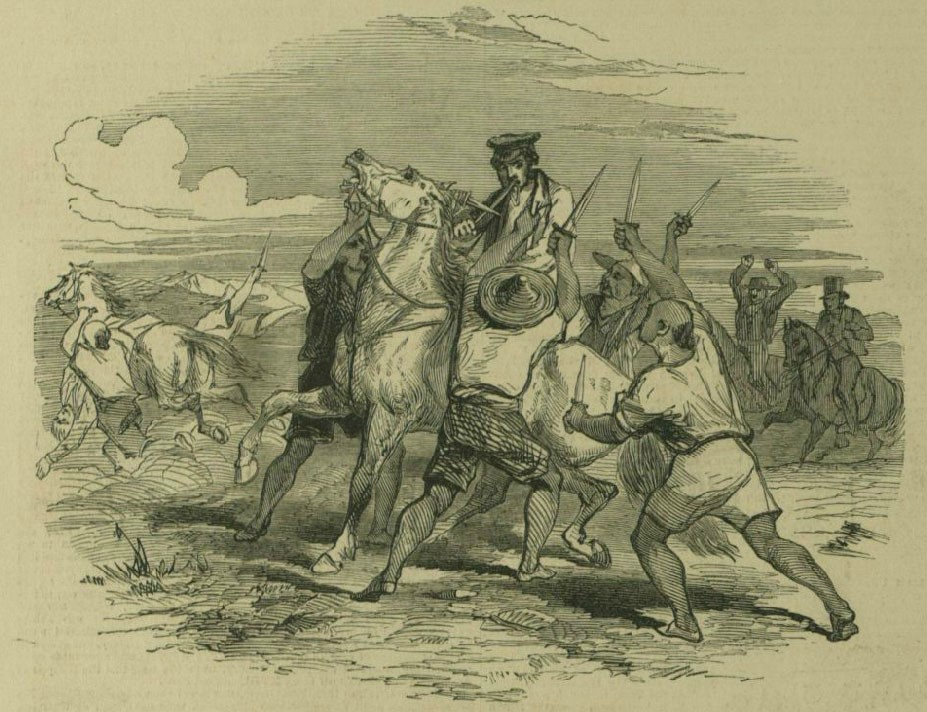
The assassination of Gov. João Maria Ferreira do Amaral, Illustrated London News, 10 November 1849

On 22 August 1849, Governor João Maria Ferreira do Amaral was assassinated near Portas do Cerco and the Chinese assassins cut off his head and right arm. This assassination, ordered, according to rumors, by the Viceroy of Canton, was followed by a military confrontation between the Portuguese and the Chinese imperial troops. The latter, shortly after the assassination, sought to gather in and around the Chinese fort of Pak-Shan-Lan or Baishaling (in Portuguese: Passaleão), which was located near the Portas do Cerco. According to the spies of the guards of the fortresses of Macau, there were about 500 soldiers in that fort and in the neighboring elevations more than 1500 men, with artillery.

On 25 August 1849, a young Macanese second lieutenant, Vicente Nicolau de Mesquita, proposed to the Government Council (which replaced the Governor) to attack the Passaleão fort, whose garrison began bombarding with its 20 cannon the Portas do Cerco, at that time garrisoned by only 120 Portuguese soldiers and three pieces of artillery. The situation was unbearable and many residents of Macau predicted the end of Portuguese rule in Macau.

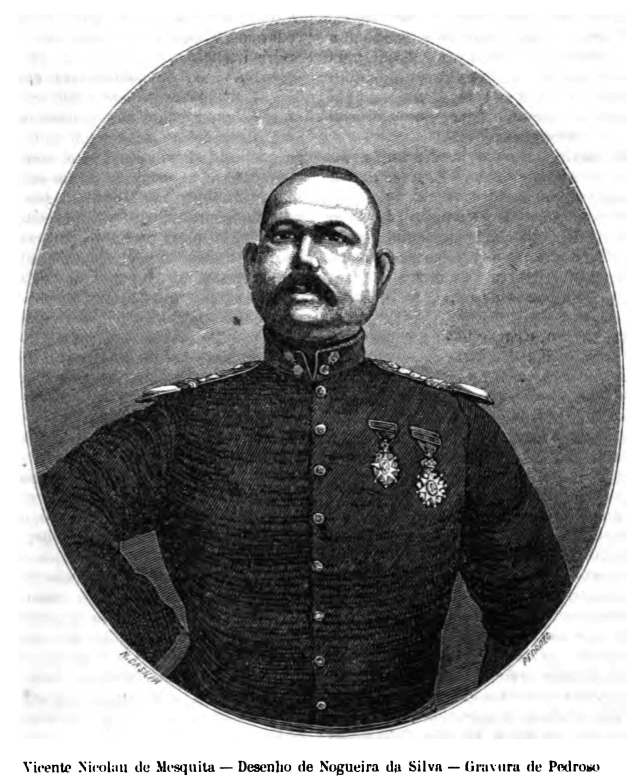
Vicente Nicolau de Mesquita, 1863

Mesquita, together with 32 soldiers supported by two pieces of field artillery and two cannons from a gunboat and a lorcha, began the attack on the fort, first bombarding it with an artillery piece that only fired once (since it broke down, after the first shot). The shot caused a panic among the Chinese troops. The panic of the Chinese soldiers was also related to an African landim soldier, who was the first to jump over the walls of the fort. Due to the confusion, Chinese troops from Passaleão and its vicinity withdrew. When the Portuguese returned victorious, they took with them, in an act of revenge, the head and hand of a mandarin who had offered resistance.

After the confrontation of Passaleão, the Tso-tang was transferred to Chinsan or Xiangshan (modern Zhongshan), a Chinese town neighboring Macau, with its power shaken. After several protests, insistence and delays, Amaral's head and right arm were delivered on January 16, 1850 and his remains transferred to Lisbon.

Both Mesquita and Ferreira do Amaral are remembered as heroes in Macau and Portugal. Later, Mesquita was promoted to Colonel. In 1871, the Government of Macau inaugurated the Arco das Portas do Cerco, with the aim of honoring the deeds of Governor Ferreira do Amaral and Colonel Mesquita.

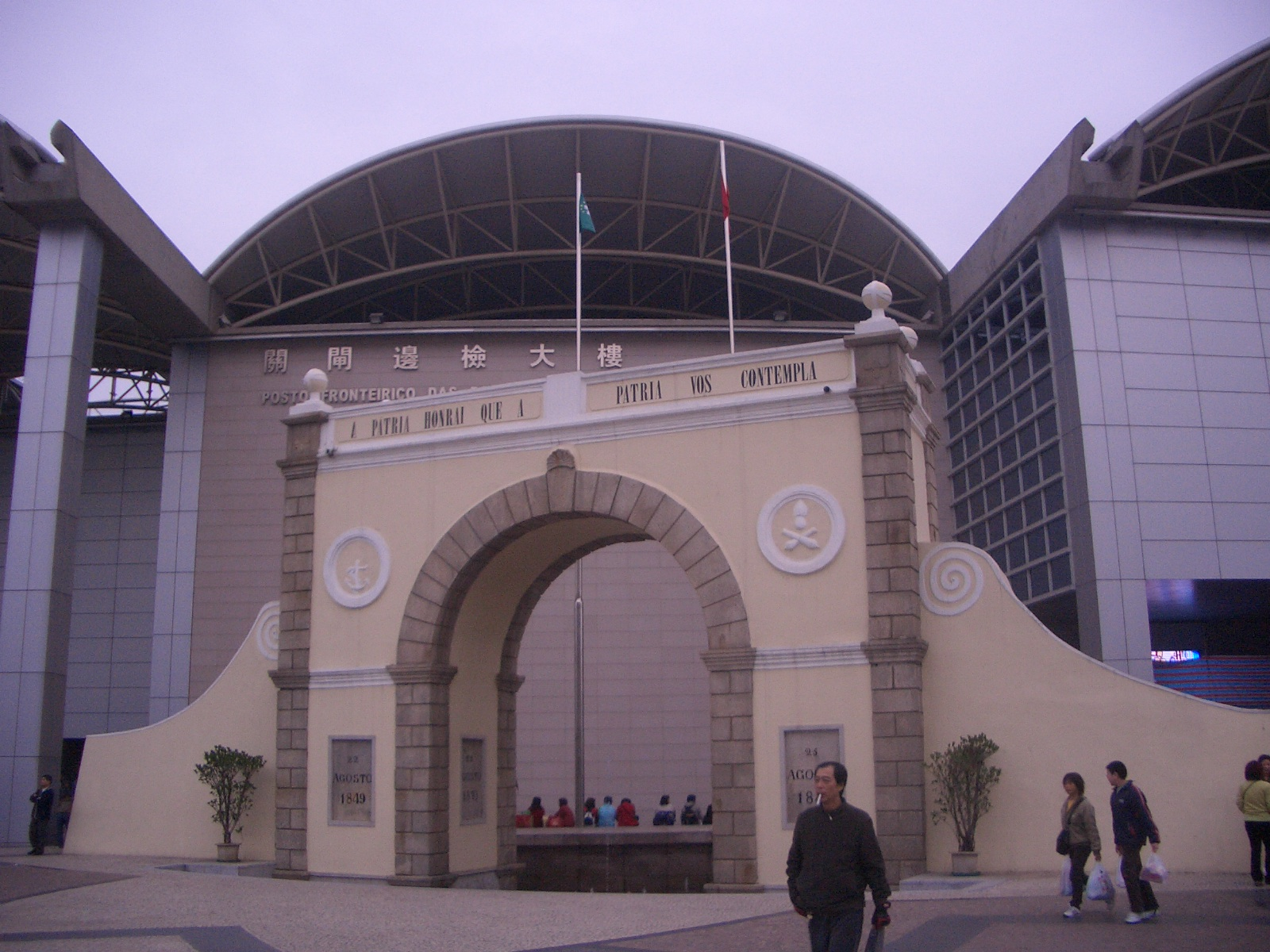
Portas do Cerco triumphal arch, built in the aftermath of Passaleão

=== Failed Treaty of Tianjin ===
During the second half of the 19th century, the main European powers humiliated the already weak Imperial Chinese Government of the Qing Dynasty, forcing it to sign the so-called Unequal Treaties. In these, the Chinese Government was obligated to open its commercial ports, to accept the European occupation of certain Chinese lands and to accept the division of China into European "areas of influence".

Perhaps taking advantage of the situation, on August 13, 1862, Governor Isidoro Francisco Guimarães managed to get the Chinese government to sign a treaty in Tianjin (or Tientsin). This treaty, consisting of 54 articles, recognized that Macau was a Portuguese colony. But it was never ratified as the Governor and Minister Plenipotentiary at that time, José Rodrigues Coelho do Amaral, returned to Macau without ratifying it, protesting against the objections of the Chinese delegates regarding the interpretation of the ninth article. They posited that Macau could not be considered a Chinese territory, raising a bitter argument with Coelho do Amaral in May 1864, when he arrived in Tianjin to ratify the treaty.

=== Sino-Portuguese Treaty of Friendship and Commerce of 1887 ===
It was only in 1887 that Portugal, which had wanted for many years to establish a treaty on Macau with China, managed to sign, with the diplomatic support of Great Britain, the "Sino-Portuguese Treaty of Friendship and Commerce", which recognized and legitimized the perpetual occupation of Macau and its dependencies by the Portuguese. This treaty, also called the "Sino-Portuguese Treaty of Peking", was signed by Sun Xuwen, the representative of China, and by Portuguese plenipotentiary minister Tomás de Sousa Rosa, who was assisted by Pedro Nolasco da Silva. The delimitation of borders was for later, through a future special convention.

=== Economy of Macau in late 19th century ===
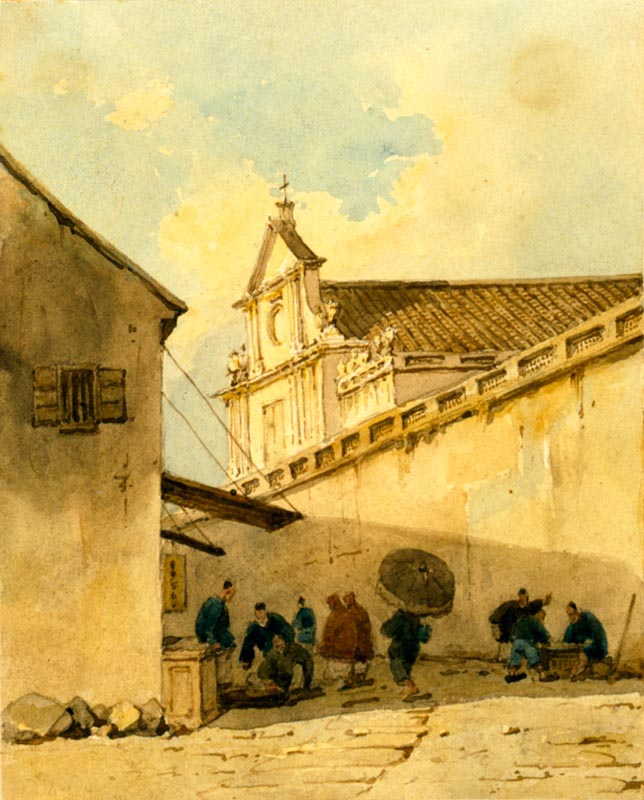
Macao Street Scene, by George Chinnery, 1840s

The 1822 constitution included Macau as an integral part of its territory. A Portuguese royal decree on 20 November 1845 declared Macau a free port. In 1847, Governor João Maria Ferreira do Amaral, knowing that Macau did not have the capacity to compete with the nascent British colony of Hong Kong, decided to legalize gambling, with the Chinese lottery (the ancestor of keno), then, in 1849, the fantan houses (Chinese "casinos"). With this legalization of gambling, which already existed clandestinely in the city, the government wanted to transform the colony into a holiday, leisure and entertainment center for the inhabitants and wealthy merchants of the region. This sector, mainly due to the great taste of the Chinese for gambling, contributed a lot to the revival of the economy and the development of Macau. Currently, it remains the most important economic activity in the region.

In addition to gambling, Macau also managed to recover part of its former prosperity, serving as a warehouse for the coolies trade and for the lucrative tea trade. It was also at this time, in the second half of the 19th century, that Macau experienced an initial industrialization, due to the development of communication and transport infrastructures and the establishment of several factories and production units, namely the tea factories, matches factories, fireworks, tobacco and cement. But Macau's industry only began to experience great development and expansion from the 1870s onwards.

The coolie trade, which began in Macau in the late 1840s, consisted of supplying contract Chinese workers to countries that at that time needed labor, such as Cuba and Peru. They lived and worked in precarious conditions, resembling slaves. This trade, while providing new prosperity to the port of Macau, brought serious social problems to the City, such as corruption, moral depression, and the need to deal with a large number of coolies repatriated or waiting to be transported to their new place of work. Incidentally, although individual merchants in Macau also profited from this commercial activity, the greatest beneficiaries of this trade were foreign companies and their agents, whose capital dominated the trade. For these reasons, the coolie trade came to an end in the late 1870s. With the end of the tea and coolie trade, Macau went into decline again and the Macau Government, also due to its political and administrative responsibilities over Timor and Solor since 1844, had to look for new ways to obtain revenue. Timor was definitively separated from Macau's administrative structure in 1896; the Macau government also had to financially support the colony of Timor. The monopoly concession by the government to private companies entrusted by it then became one of the privileged ways of obtaining state revenue. This measure ensured the continuity of the stable and regular supply of revenues to the Government, since companies that held monopolies generally suffered little or no competition and were obliged, in addition to taxes, to pay a fixed annual amount to the Government, regardless of their revenues. In the 19th century, the most notable and important monopolies were the opium sector.

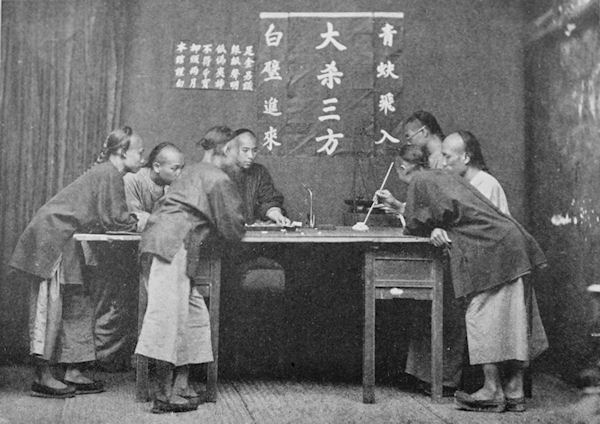
Fan-tan gambling house at Macau

Mainly after the end of the tea and coolies trade, still in the 19th century, Macau's economy came to be supported largely by the gambling sector, fishing, and the various monopolies granted by the government (namely that of opium). But trade did not cease to exist in Macau or cease to be important for the colony. The city has always been home to a class of buyers and traders, mostly Chinese, who maintained commercial relations with various locations in China and Southeast Asia, and who made a profit from their intermediary activity of importing products and then re-exporting them. Some of these activities, such as the import, sale and re-export of oil and gold, were even monopolized by the government, whose monopoly rights were later granted to a private company.

=== Territorial expansion ===
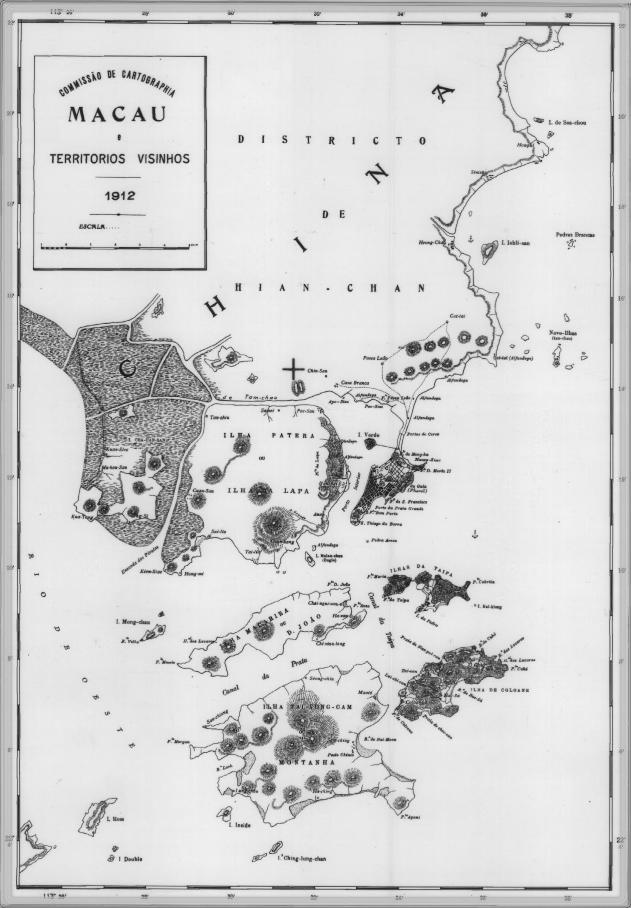
1912 map of Macau and environs

In the first half of the 19th century, the Portuguese, who were previously allowed to inhabit only the south of the Macau Peninsula, began to exercise jurisdiction over the north of the peninsula. They also wanted to occupy land located beyond the Portas do Cerco, but were unable to.

In 1847, Governor Ferreira do Amaral ordered the construction of a fortress on the island of Taipa, designed to protect the Chinese inhabitants and traders from pirates and also to assert Portuguese presence on the island. In 1851, the Portuguese took control of all of Taipa. The occupation of the island of Coloane began in 1864. When the Portuguese arrived on the islands of Taipa and Coloane, Chinese pirates had great influence on them and terrorized their inhabitants. A famous clash occurred in Coloane in 1910, where the Portuguese were victorious.

In 1890, the Portuguese officially occupied Ilha Verde, which was located 1 kilometre west of the Macau Peninsula. Due to landfills, this island was completely absorbed by the Peninsula in 1923.

In the 19th century, the Portuguese also began to expand their influence to the islands of Lapa, Dom João and Montanha (adjacent to Macau), offering protection and services (e.g., education) to the few Chinese residents there in exchange for taxes. At the time, these three islands were already inhabited by Portuguese missionaries, with the island of Lapa already inhabited since the end of the 17th century. They were officially occupied by the Portuguese in 1938, under the pretext of protecting the Portuguese and missionaries residing there. In 1941, during World War II, the Portuguese were expelled and the islands occupied by the Imperial Japanese Army (no armed struggle or deaths were recorded, which constantly launched threats to the government of Macau. After the war, with the defeat of Japan, the Portuguese were unable to reoccupy the islands of Lapa, D. João, and Montanha, which were returned to China.

At the beginning of the 20th century, after the various annexations, the Colony of Macau (excluding Lapa, D. João, Montanha, and certain nearby islands over which the Portuguese claimed sovereignty) had approximately an area of 11.6 km^{2} (4.5 sq mi), distributed as follows: Peninsula Macau, including Ilha Verde, 3.4 km^{2} (1.3 sq mi); Taipa, 2.3 km^{2} (0.89 sq mi); and Coloane, 5.9 km^{2} (2.3 sq mi).

Macau, not satisfied with the annexations carried out, undertook a series of landfill works that continue today [when?]. In the 1990s, a series of landfill works were performed on the narrow and small Taipa-Coloane isthmus, giving rise to the Landfill Zone of COTAI.

These works more than doubled the area of Macau, and currently [when?] the area of the Special Administrative Region of Macao (SAR) is 28.6 km^{2} (11.0 sq mi), distributed as follows: Peninsula of Macao, 9.3 km^{2} (3.6 sq mi); Taipa, 6.5 km^{2} (2.5 sq mi); Coloane, 7.6 km^{2} (2.9 sq mi); and COTAI Landfill Zone, 5.2 km^{2} (2.0 sq mi).

=== 19th century on ===
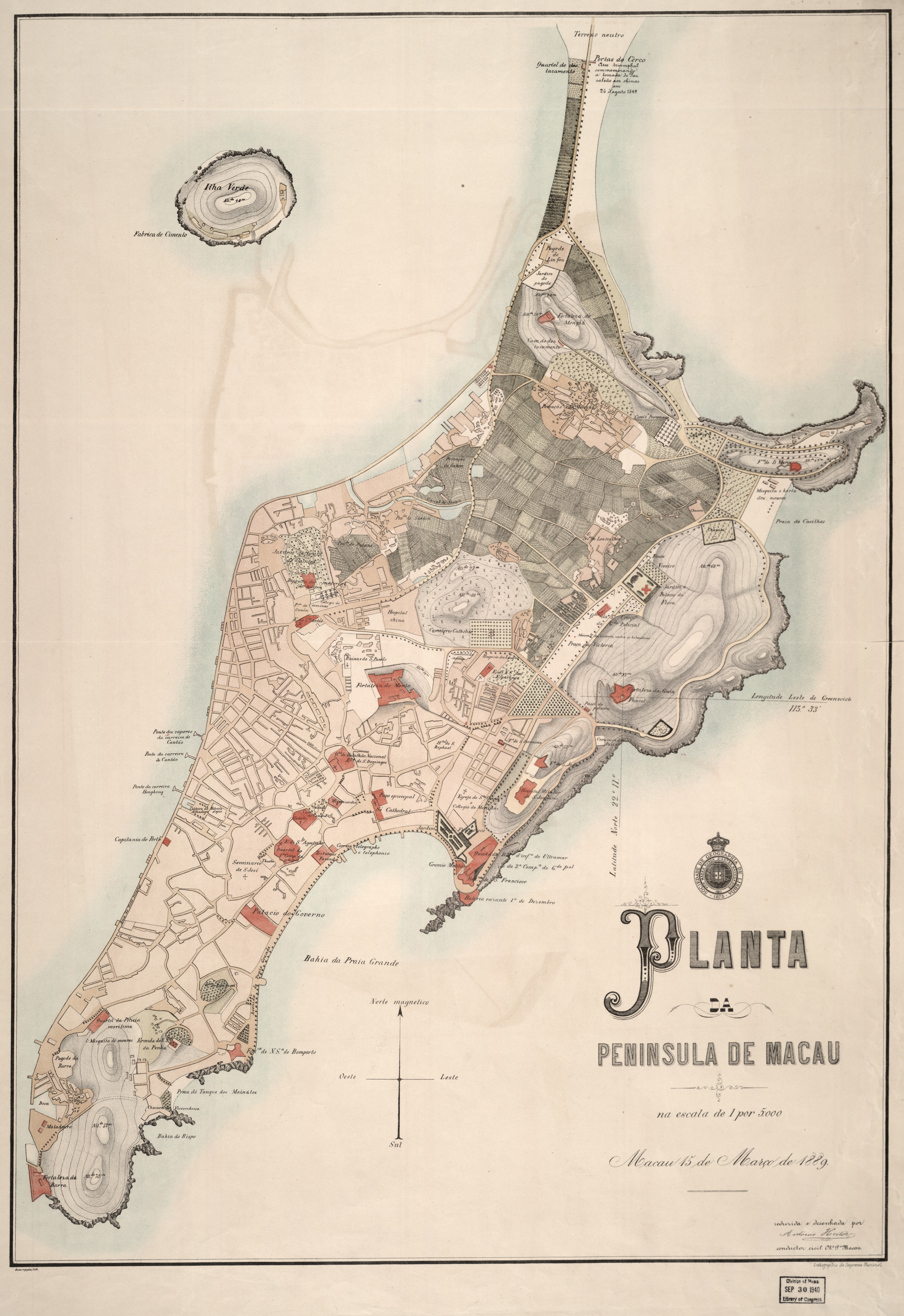
1889 map of Macau

On 26 March 1887, the Lisbon Protocol was signed, in which China recognised the "perpetual occupation and government of Macao" by Portugal who in turn, agreed never to surrender Macau to a third party without Chinese agreement. This was reaffirmed in the Treaty of Peking on 1 December. A growing nationalist movement in China voiced disapproval of the treaty and questioned its validity. Although the Nationalist (Kuomintang) government in China vowed to abrogate the "unequal treaties", Macau's status remained unchanged.

The 1928 Sino-Portuguese Treaty of Friendship and Trade reaffirmed Portuguese administration over Macau.

=== Second World War ===
Macau's population doubled during World War II (1939–1945) due to the influx of people fleeing the Japanese occupation of Southeast Asia. The refugees mainly came from neighboring cities such as Canton and Hong Kong. Japan respected the neutrality of Portugal.

Even though the Japanese had no intention of occupying Macau, they established a powerful consulate in the city. In addition to its diplomatic functions, it also served as a center for espionage and the detention of anti-Japanese Chinese figures, many of whom had fled China for Macau. The Japanese, occupying all neighboring lands of Macau (including Hong Kong), were able to supervise the political and administrative activity of Macau, through their consul, Fukui Yasumitsu, who was elevated to the status of special adviser to the Governor of Macau. Still, there was strong tension between the Macau Government and the Japanese Army. The Portuguese feared an invasion of Macau by Japanese troops because the local garrison did not have the capacity to defend the colony. The actions of Governor Gabriel Maurício Teixeira and Pedro José Lobo, at the time head or director of the Central Office of Economic Services, were crucial for Macau remaining relatively intact during the war.

Despite Macau's neutrality, a seaplane port was bombed, allegedly by accident, and the islands of Lapa, Dom João and Montanha were occupied by the Japanese Army. The consequences of the war for Macau were limited to overpopulation and the lack of imported goods, of which food was the most urgent, and caused thousands of deaths. After the war, Macau's population began to decline due to the return of many Chinese refugees.

In 1946, Teixeira was removed from Macau and, later, dismissed as Governor, due to strong pressure exerted by the Chinese authorities, who accused him of having collaborated with the Japanese during the war.

=== Post-war Macau and Carnation Revolution ===
In 1945, after the end of extraterritorial rights in China, the Nationalists called for the liquidation of foreign control over Hong Kong and Macau, but they were too preoccupied in the civil war with the Communists to fulfil their goals.

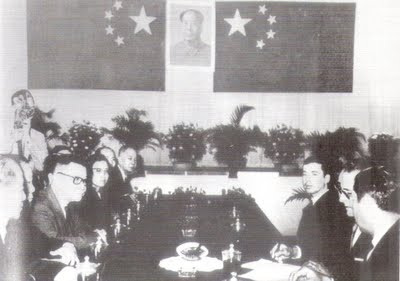
The Portuguese governor of Macau signing a statement of personal apology under a portrait of Mao Zedong

Following massive anti-Portuguese demonstrations in 1966 which would be known as the 12-3 incident, Portuguese sovereignty was severely diminished, thus leading to de facto Chinese suzerainty over the territory.

After the 1974 Carnation Revolution in Portugal, a decolonisation policy paved the way for Macau's retrocession to the People's Republic of China (PRC). Portugal offered to withdraw from Macau in late 1974, but China declined in favour of a later time because it sought to preserve international and local confidence in Hong Kong, which was still under British rule. In January 1975, Portugal recognised the mainland's PRC instead of rump ROC in Taiwan as the sole government of China. On 17 February 1976, the Portuguese parliament passed the Organic Statute of Macau, which called it a "territory under Portuguese administration". This term was also put in Portugal's 1976 constitution, replacing Macau's designation as an overseas province. Unlike previous constitutions, Macau was not included as an integral part of Portuguese territory. The 1987 Sino-Portuguese Joint Declaration called Macau a "Chinese territory under Portuguese administration".

=== Transfer of sovereignty ===
The transfer of full sovereignty to the People's Republic of China was performed in a ceremony on 20 December 1999, in the early hours of the morning, according to the Joint Declaration, after many years of negotiations and preparations.

== Government ==
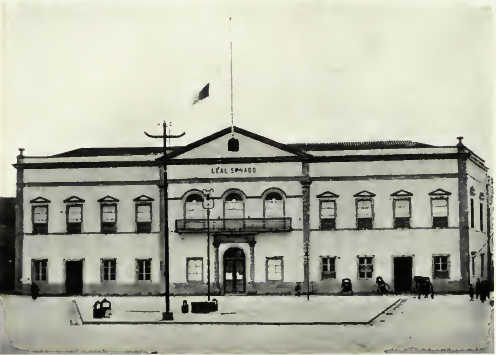
Macau's Leal Senado

Since 1657, the office of Captain-Major was awarded by the King of Portugal or on his behalf by the Viceroy of India to any fidalgo (nobleman) or gentleman who excelled in services to the Crown. The Captain-Major was head of the fleets and emporia from Malacca to Japan, and the official representative of Portugal to Japan and China. Since he was often away from Macau for long periods, an embryonic municipal government formed in 1560 to resolve matters. Three representatives chosen by vote held the title of eleitos (elected) and could perform administrative and judicial duties.

By 1583, the Senate Council was formed, later called the Loyal Senate (Leal Senado). It consisted of three aldermen, two judges, and one city procurator. Portuguese citizens in Macau elected six electors who would then select the senators. The most serious issues were dealt with by convening the General Council of Ecclesiastic Authorities and leading citizens to decide what measures should be taken. After several Dutch invasions, the Senate created the post of War Governor in 1615 to establish a permanently present military commander. In 1623, the Viceroy created the office of Governor and Captain-General of Macau, replacing the Captain-Major's authority over the territory.

Macau was originally administered as part of Xiangshan County (Héong San). Chinese and Portuguese officials discussed affairs in casa da câmara, or the city hall, where the Leal Senado Building was later built. In 1731, the Chinese set up an assistant magistrate (縣丞; jyun6 sing4) in Qianshan (Chin San) to manage affairs in Macau. In 1743, he was later based in Mong Ha village (望廈村; mong6 haa6 cyun1), now part of Nossa Senhora de Fátima, Macau. In 1744, the Chinese formed the Macau Coast Military and Civilian Government headed by a subprefect (同知; tung4 zi1) based in Qianshan.

== Sovereignty ==
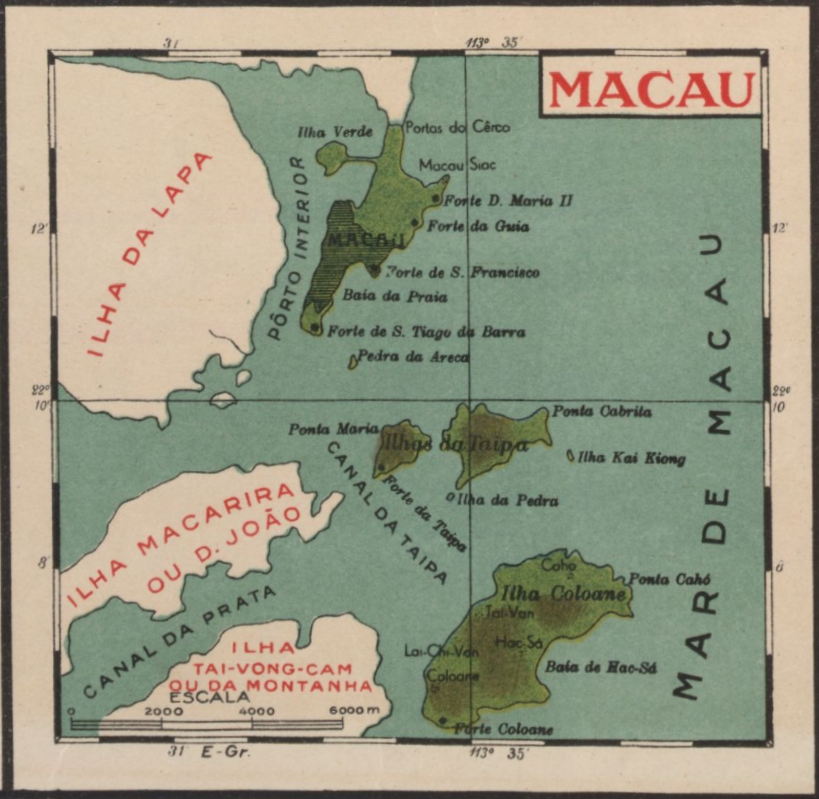
Portuguese map of Macau, 1934

Sovereignty over Macau has been a complex issue. Professor of Sociology Zhidong Hao of the University of Macau said that some consider sovereignty to be "absolute" and cannot be shared, while others say it is "relative" and can be joint or shared. He stated:

The complexity of the sovereignty question in Macau suggests that the Chinese and Portuguese shared Macau's sovereignty before 1999. [...] In the colonial period of Macau, China had the lesser control in Macau, therefore the lesser sovereignty, and Portugal had more of it. On the other hand, if the Portuguese had sovereignty over Macau, even after the 1887 treaty, it was never absolute either. So sovereignty in fact had been shared between China and Portugal in one way or another, with one party having more at one time than the other.

Macau's political status was still disputed after the 1887 treaty, due to the treaty's ambiguous wording. The interpretation depends on the perspective of the writer, with the Portuguese and Chinese taking different sides. Scholar Paulo Cardinal, who has been a legal advisor to the Legislative Assembly of Macau, wrote:

On an international law level of analysis, Macau has been characterized by western scholars as a territory on a lease; a union community with Portugal enshrined in and by the Chief of State; a condominium; a territory under an internationalized regime; a territory under a special situation; an autonomous territory without integration connected to a special international situation; and a dependent community subjected to a dual distribution of sovereignty powers (in other words, China held the sovereignty right but Portugal was responsible for its exercise). Without a doubt, it was an atypical situation. Since the Joint Declaration, Macau was, until 19 December 1999, an internationalized territory by international law standards, despite the absence of such a label in the treaty itself.

== Language ==
Portuguese was an official language. In December 1991, the government added Chinese as an official language with equal status with Portuguese as per Decree-Law 455/91. In 1992 the Macau Government Gazette (Portuguese: Boletim Oficial de Macau, Chinese: 澳門政府公報) published this law. The U.S. State Department stated that Cantonese was the variety of Chinese used officially.

== Education ==
In 1594, the Jesuits opened St. Paul's College, the first Western-style university in the East.

In 1728, St. Joseph's Seminary and Church was founded and provided an academic curriculum equivalent to a Western university.

In 1893, Liceu de Macau was opened, the only public Portuguese language school. Official teaching in Portuguese underwent reforms after the Portuguese revolution of 1911, and education in Macau experienced a great development. The education promoted by the Church, despite continuing with government support, evolved into private education and the private teaching in Chinese was moved from private home classes to state schools.

According to the 1921 Yearbook, public education in Macau covered 125 secondary and primary schools, of which 2 official schools (Macao Liceu and Commercial School), 7 schools subsidized by the Government, 10 municipal schools and 4 Church schools, with a total number of 5477 students.

In 1928, the Yuet Wah College was moved from Guangzhou to Macau. During the Japanese invasion of China in 1937, other private educational institutions closed their doors in mainland China and also moved to Macau.

== Gallery ==
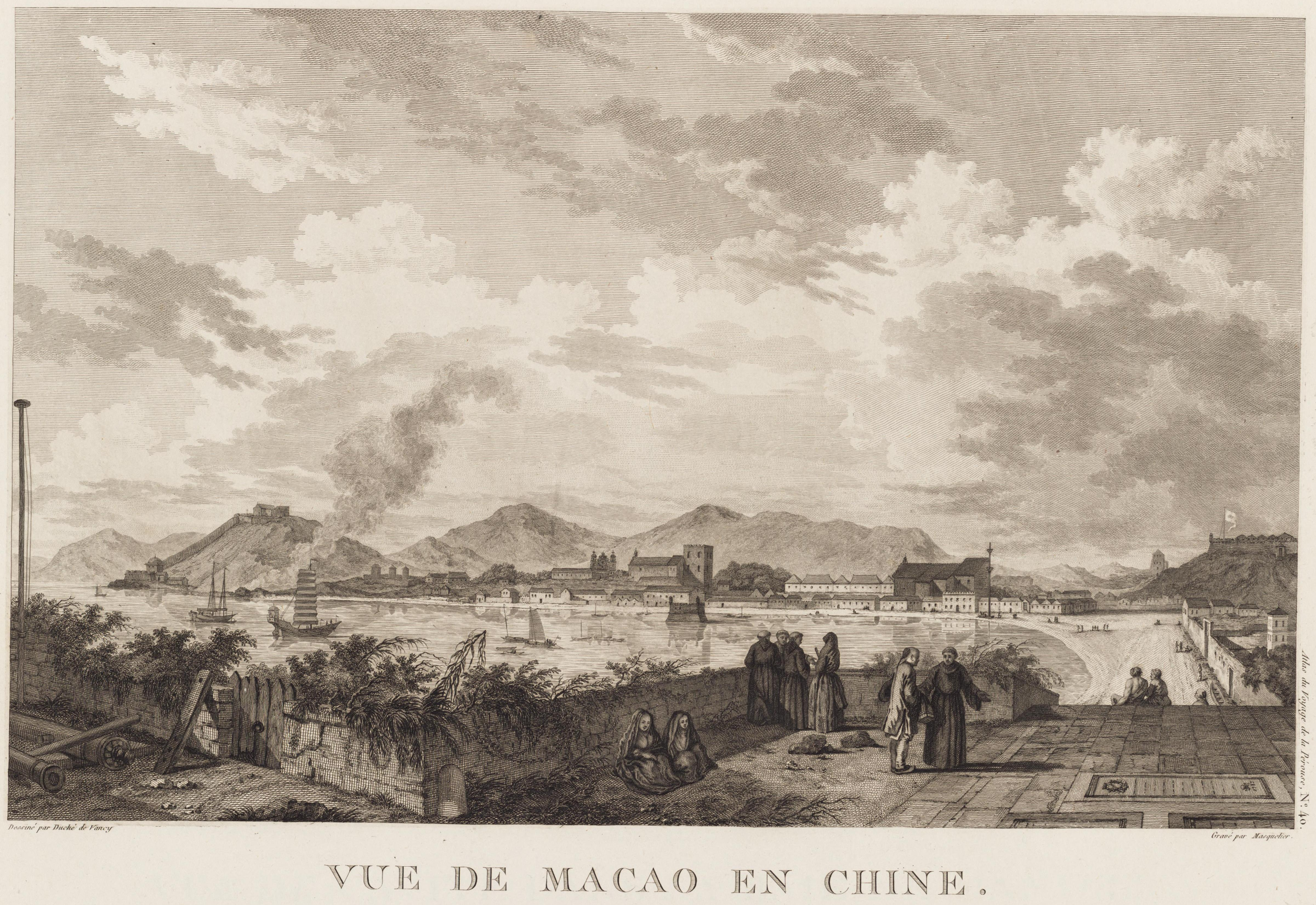
1787 French depiction of Macau

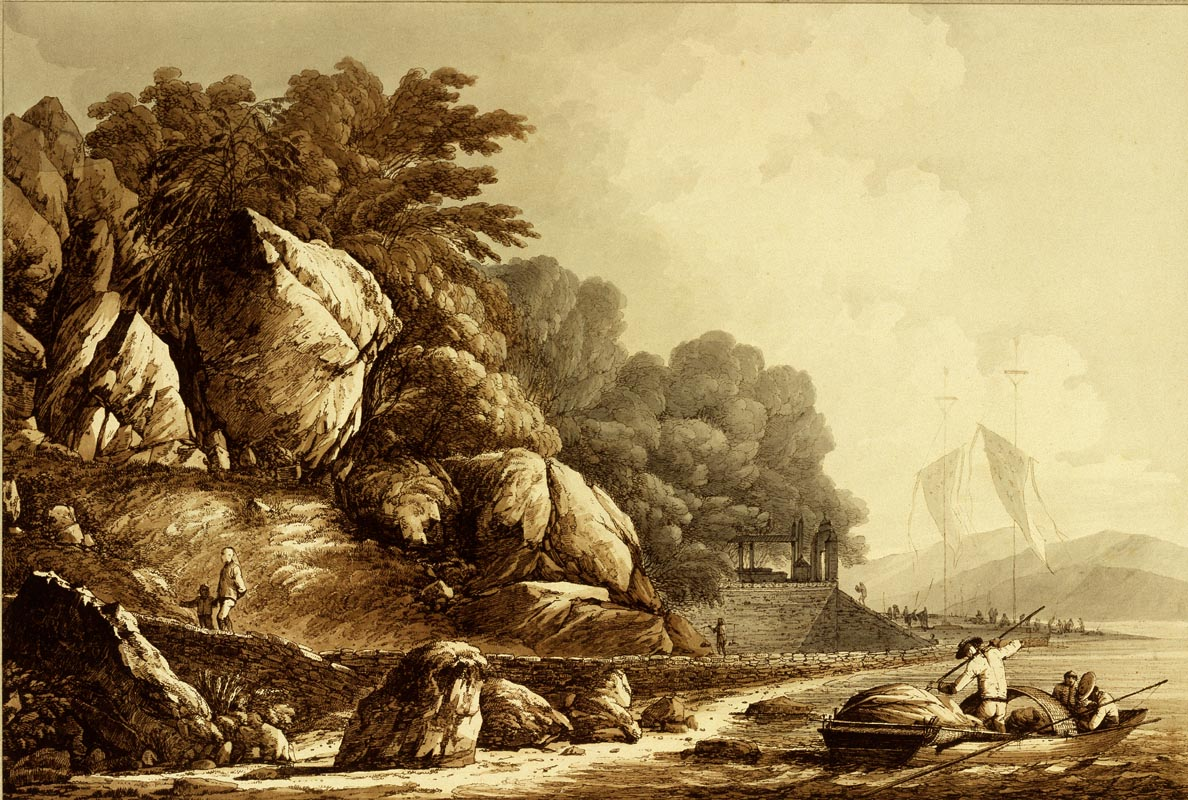
1788 Depiction of the Inner Harbour of Macau at Ma Kok Temple

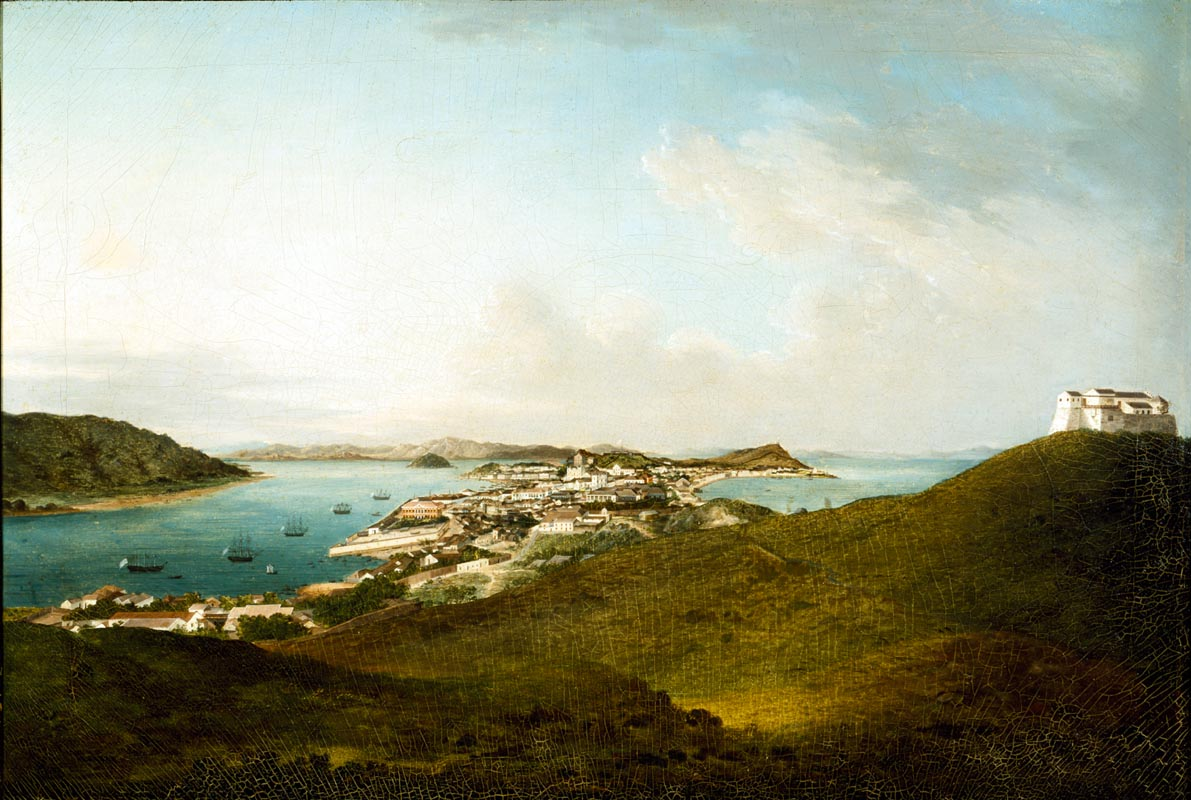
Macau, View of Two Bays, circa 1830

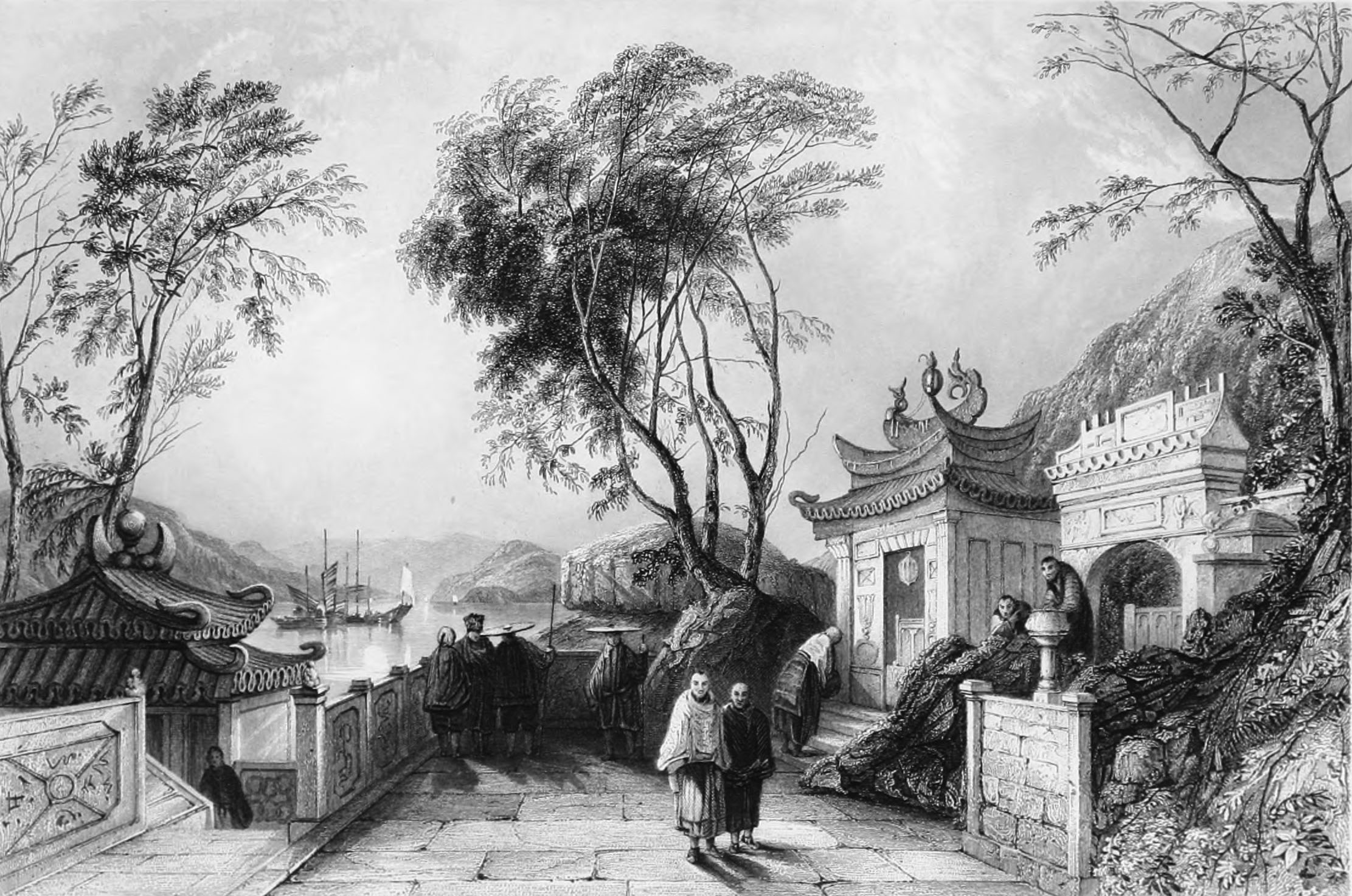
Chapel in the Great Temple of Macau, 1843

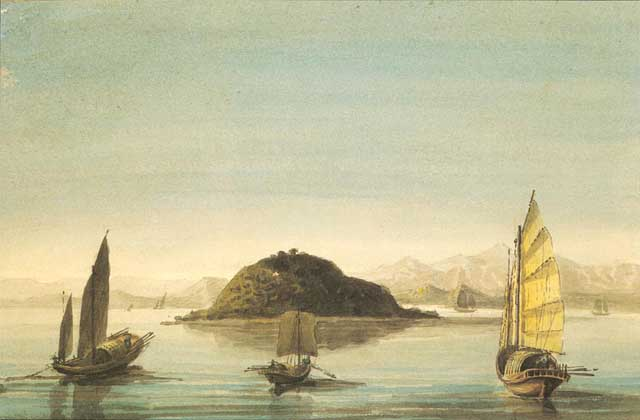
Ilha Verde in 1844

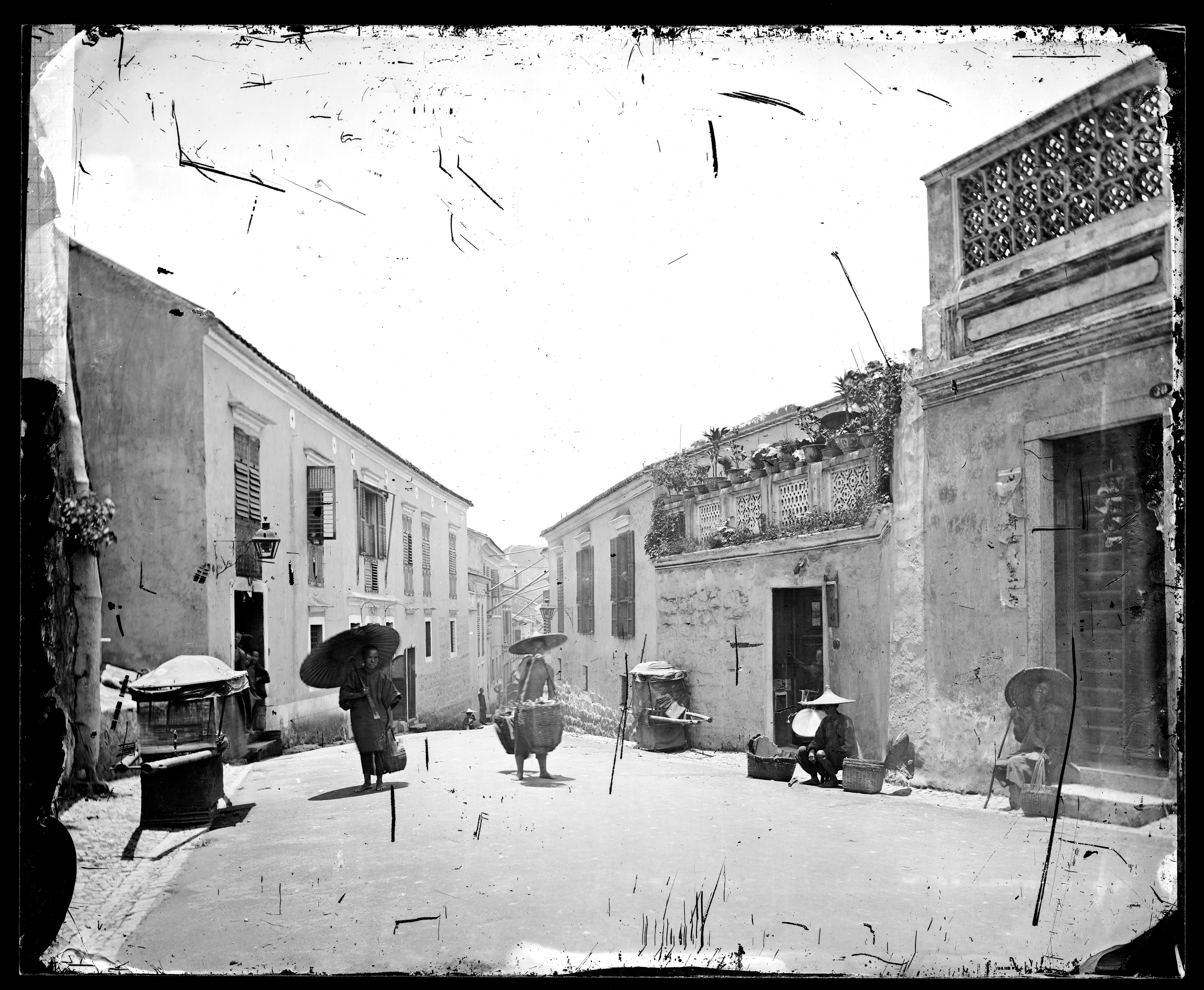
Street in Macau, by John Thomson, c. 1870

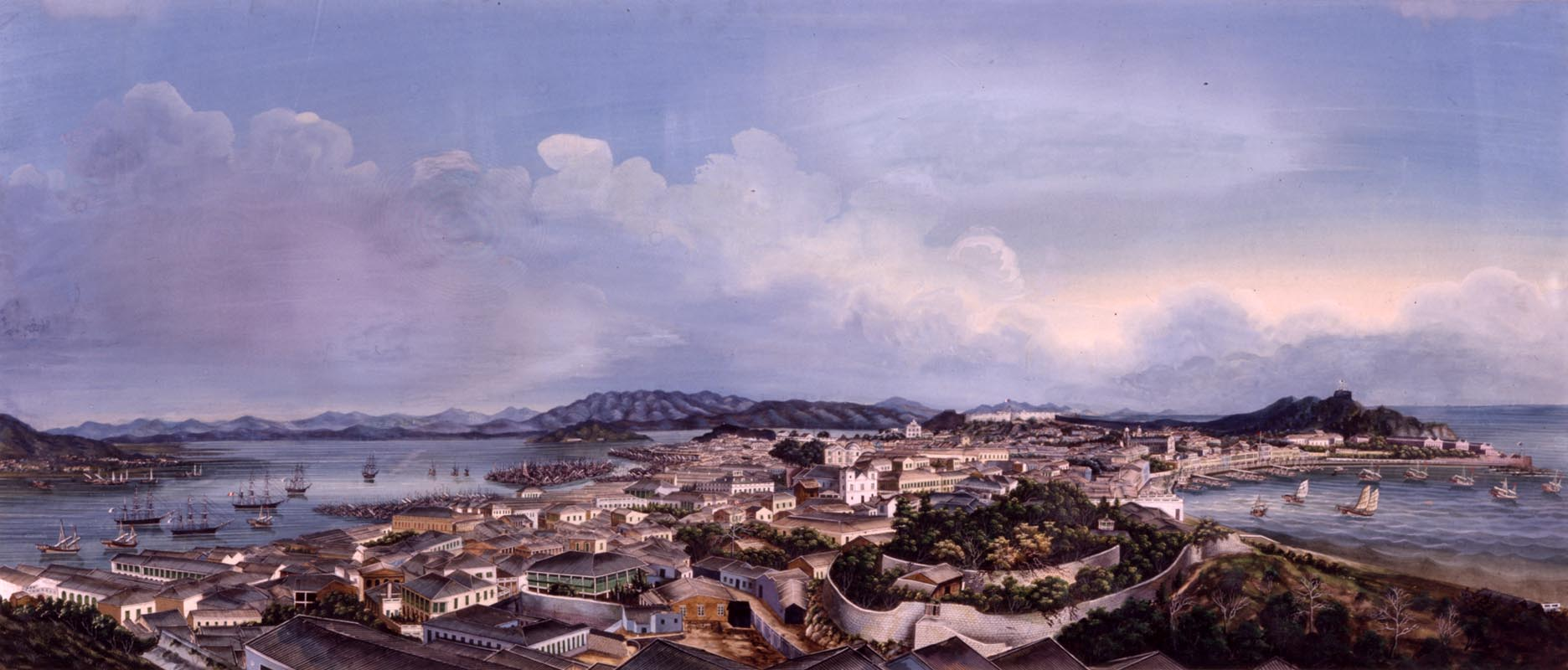
Panoramic painting of Macau from Penha Hill, c. 1870

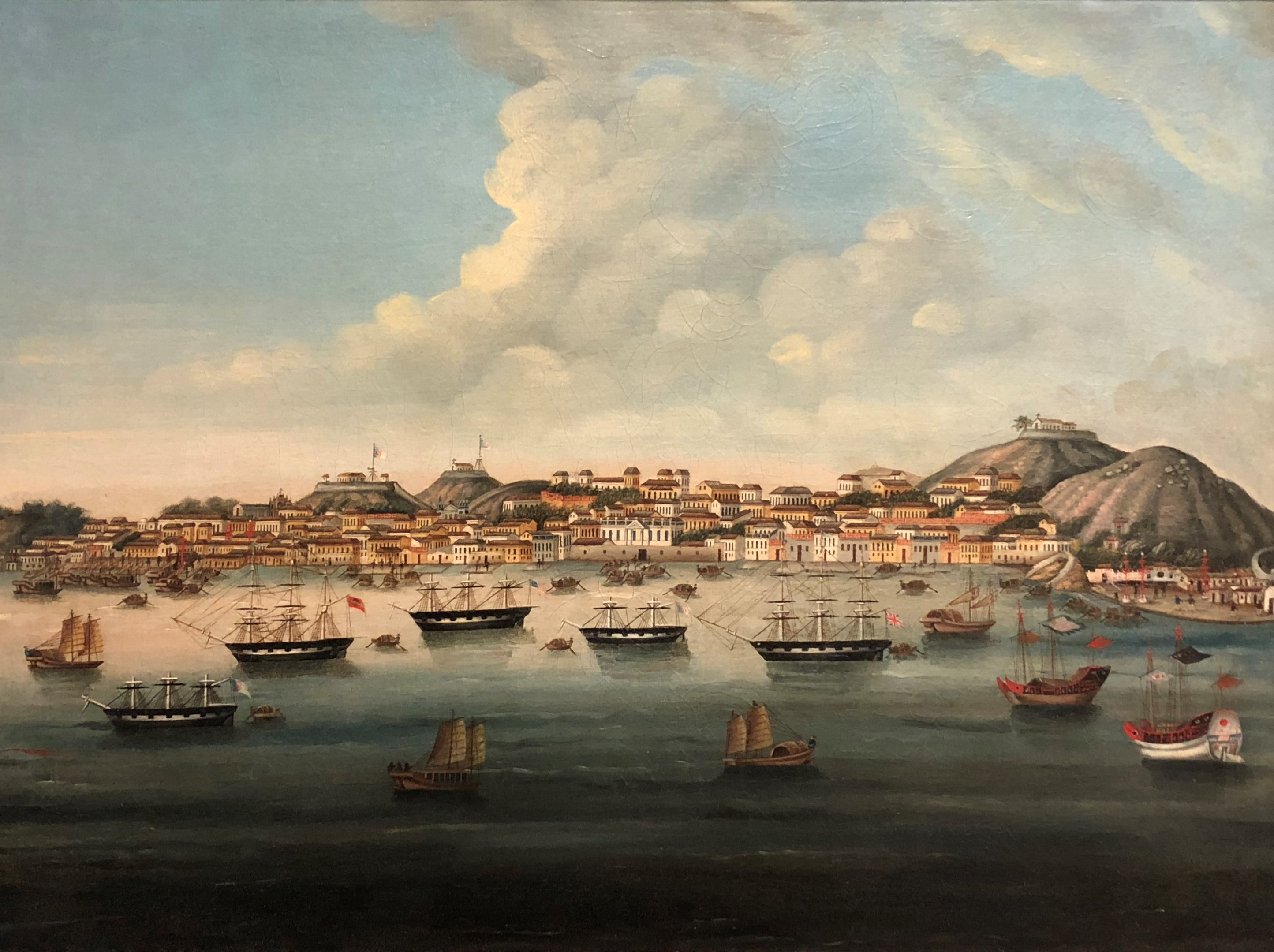
Early 19th century painting of Macau

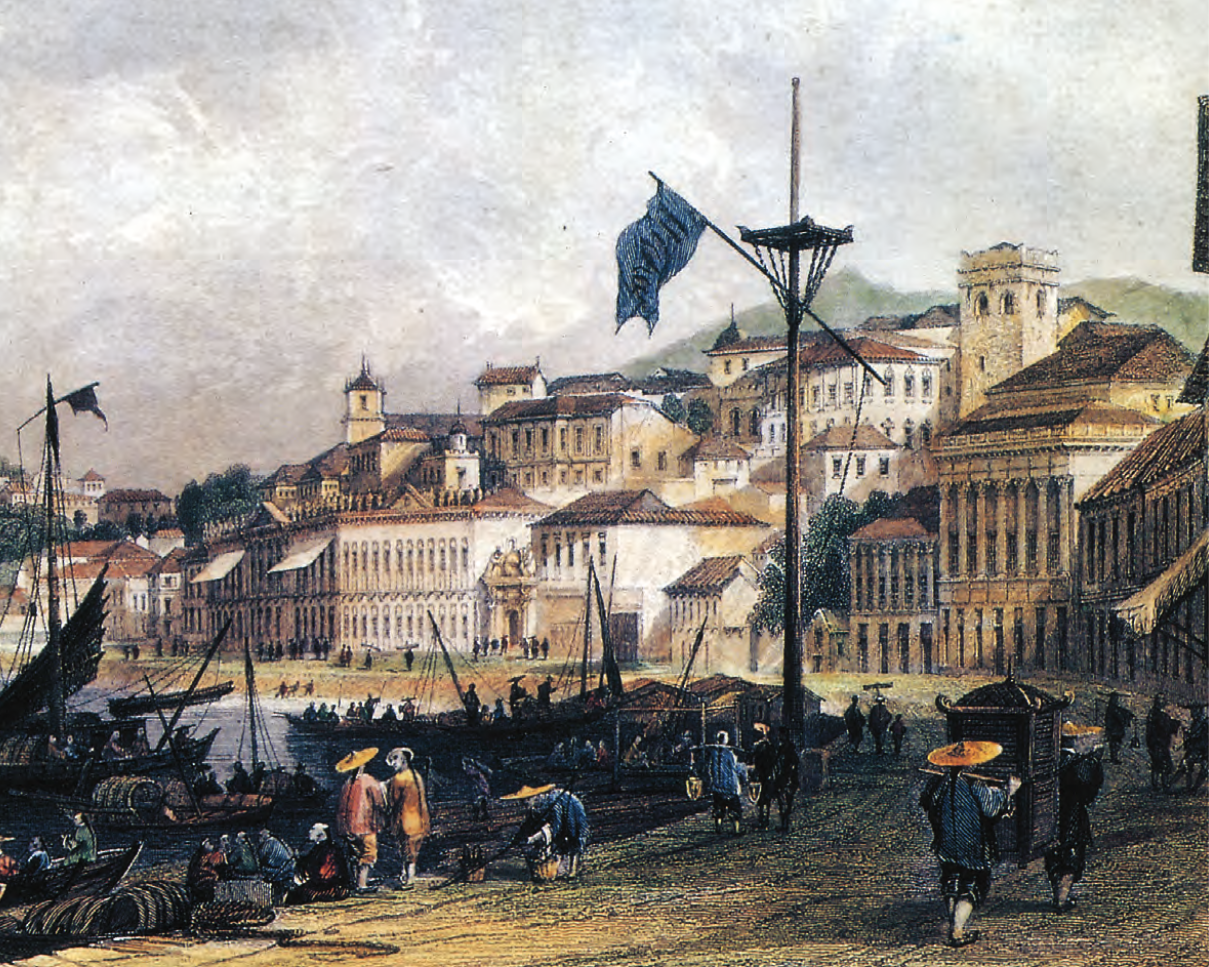
19th century depiction of Praia Grande by W. H. Capone

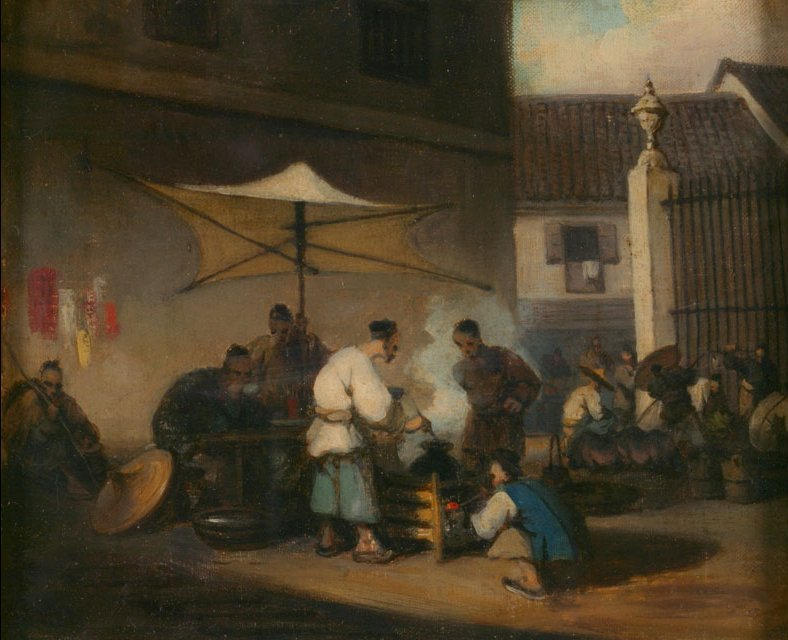
Street Scene at Macau, by George Chinnery

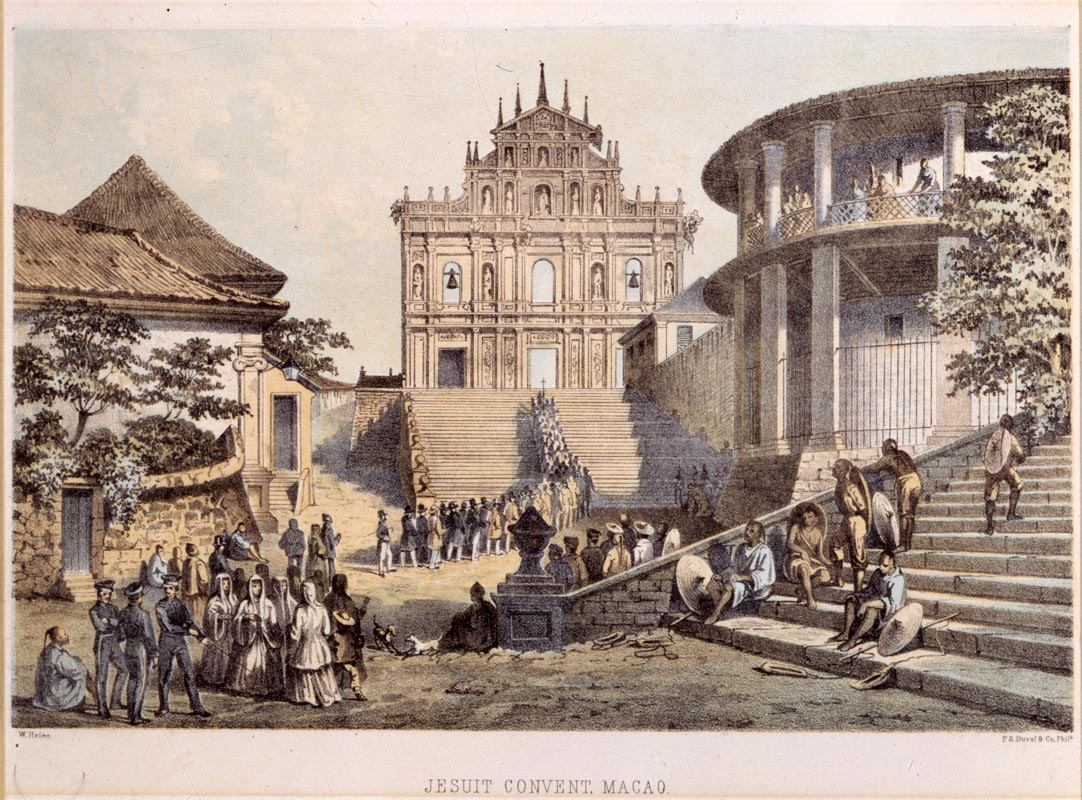
Ruins of St. Paul Church

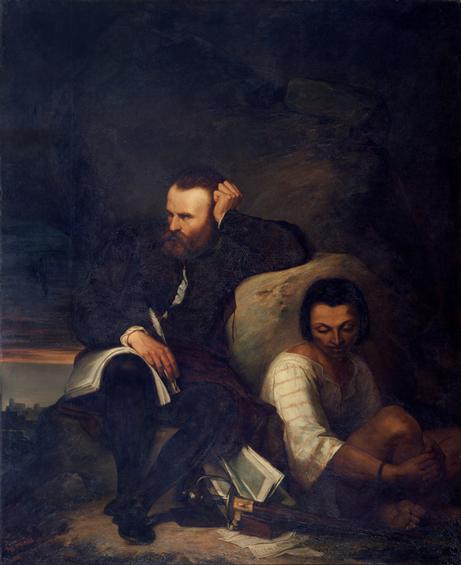
Camões in Macau, at his grotto. Painting by Francisco Augusto Metrass.

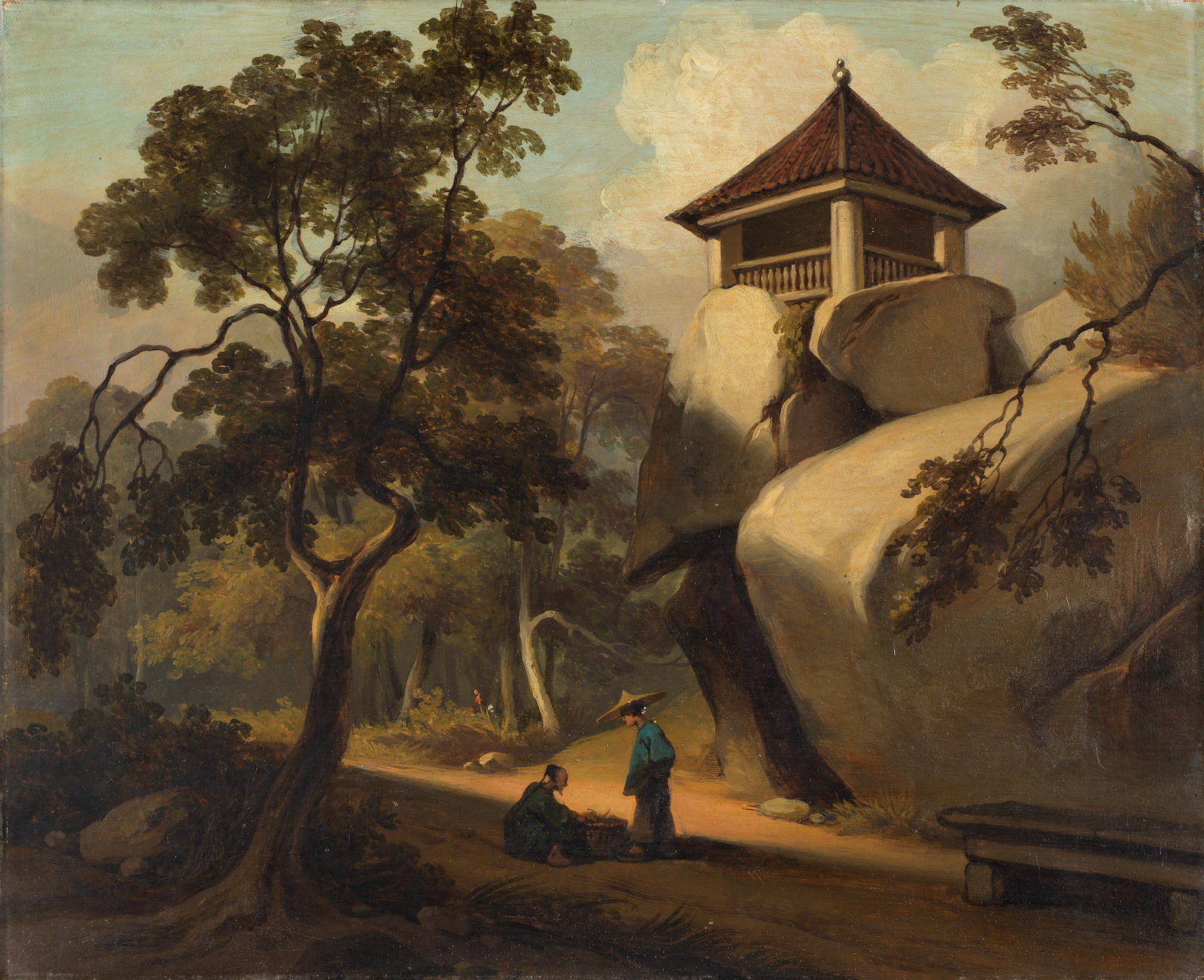
The Grotto of Camões, painted by George Chinnery

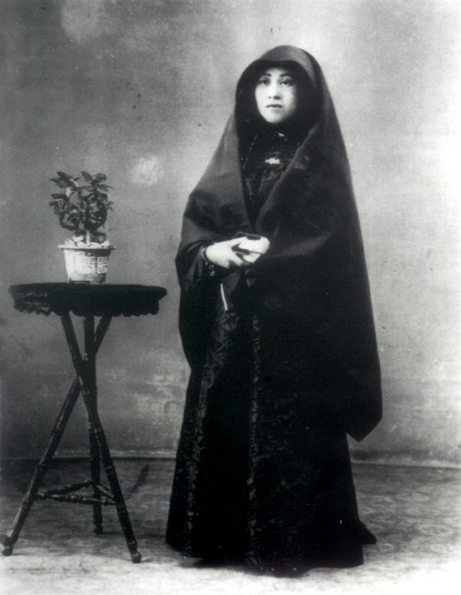
Macanese senhora wearing the traditional Macanese dress, the dó

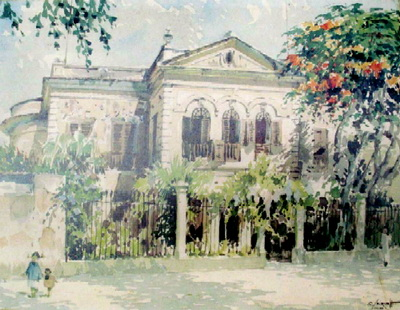
Mateus Ricci primary school, painted in 1945

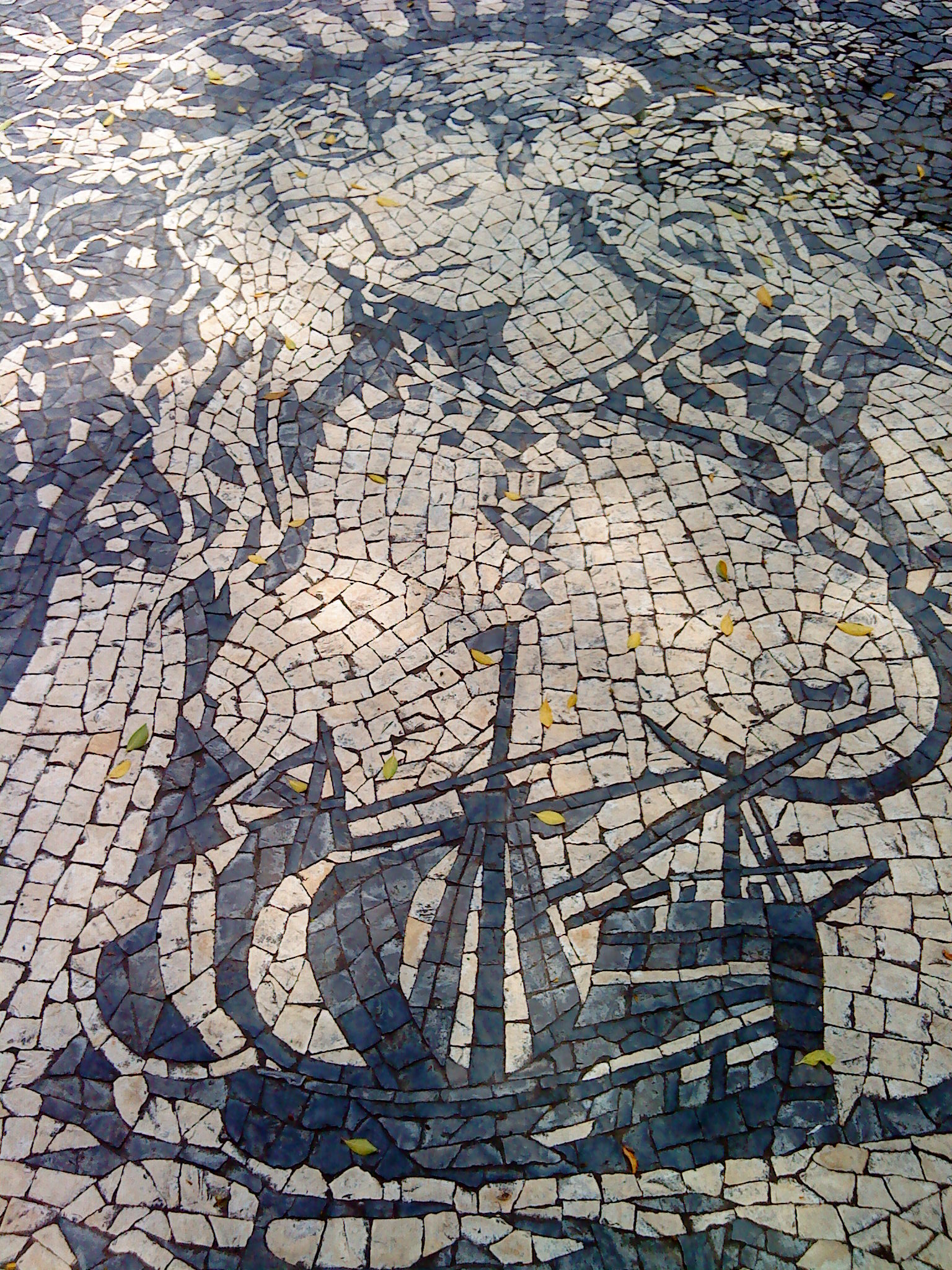
Portuguese pavement inspired on The Lusiads at Camões Garden

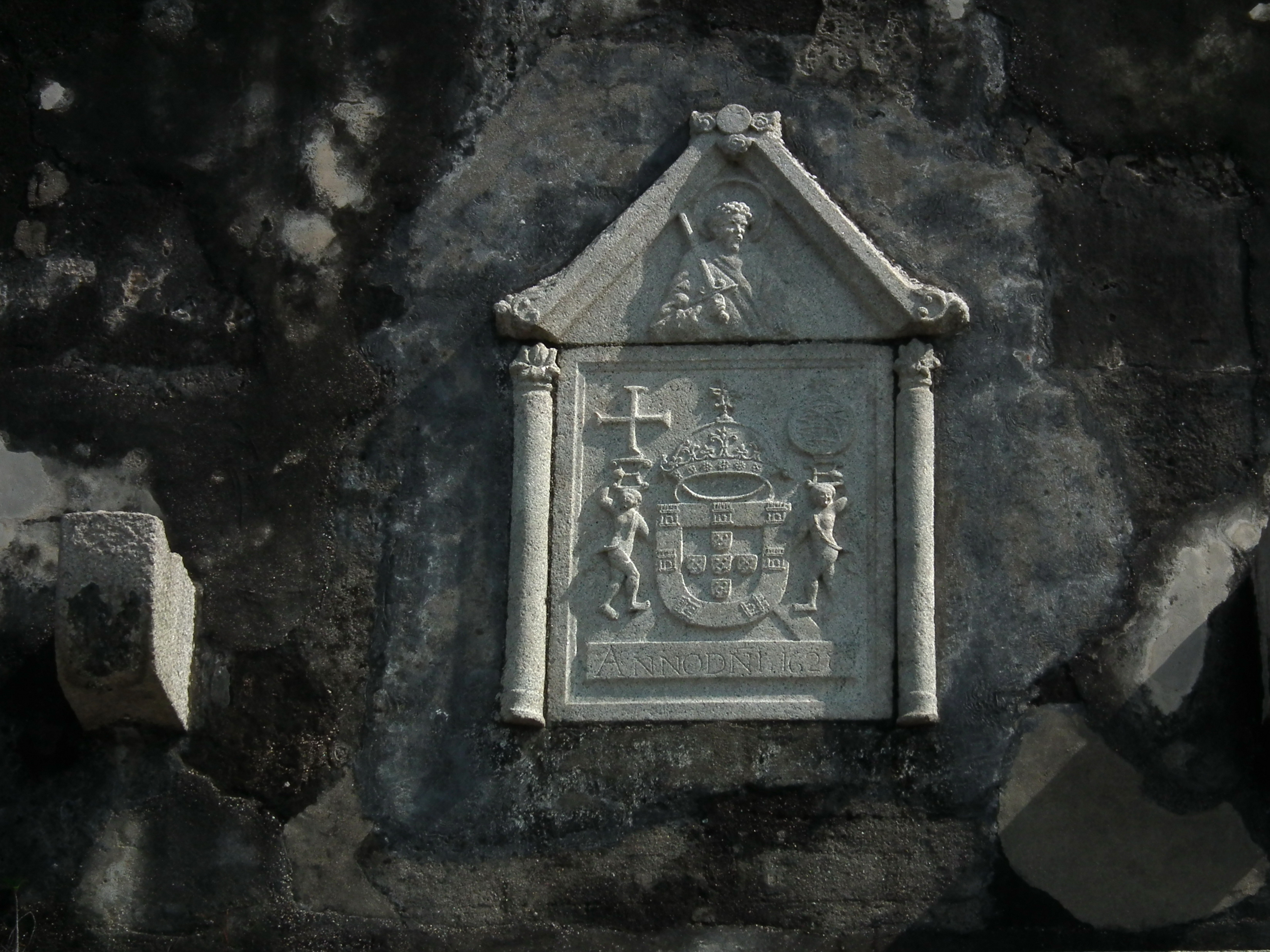
Portuguese coat of arms at Monte Fort

=== Portuguese architecture ===
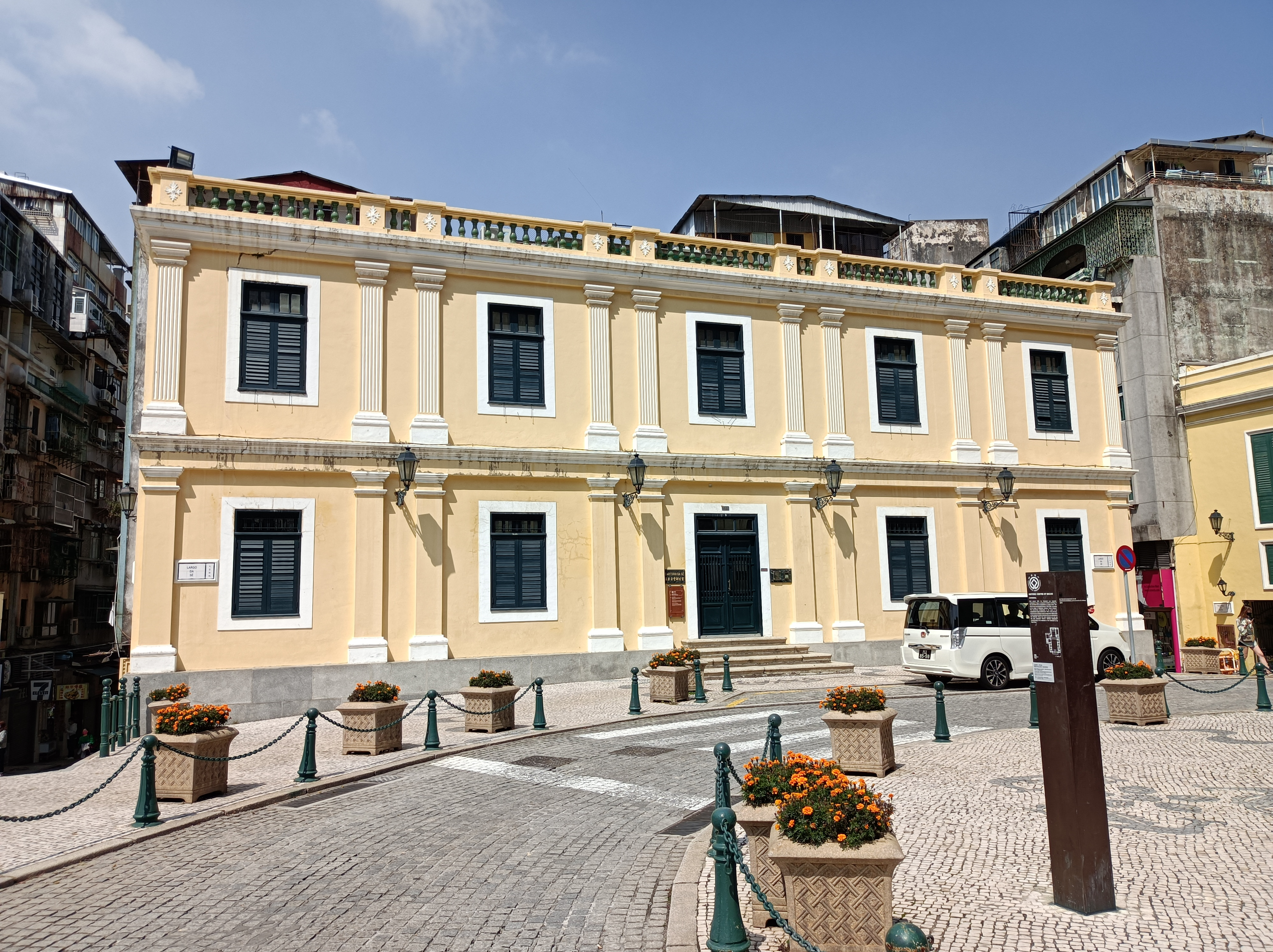
House at Largo da Sé, nº1

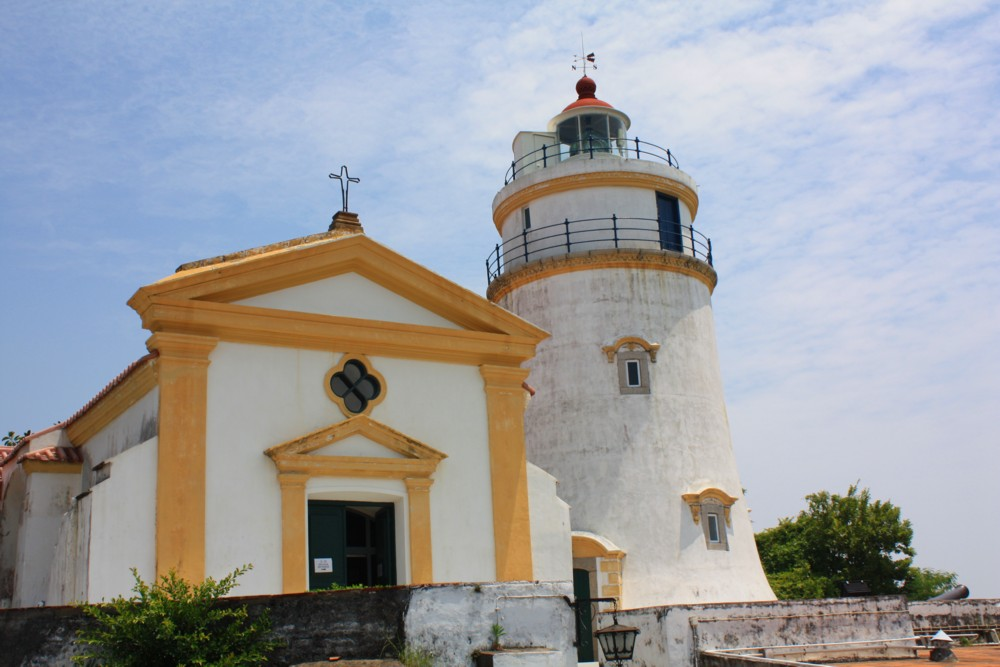
Church at Guia Fortress

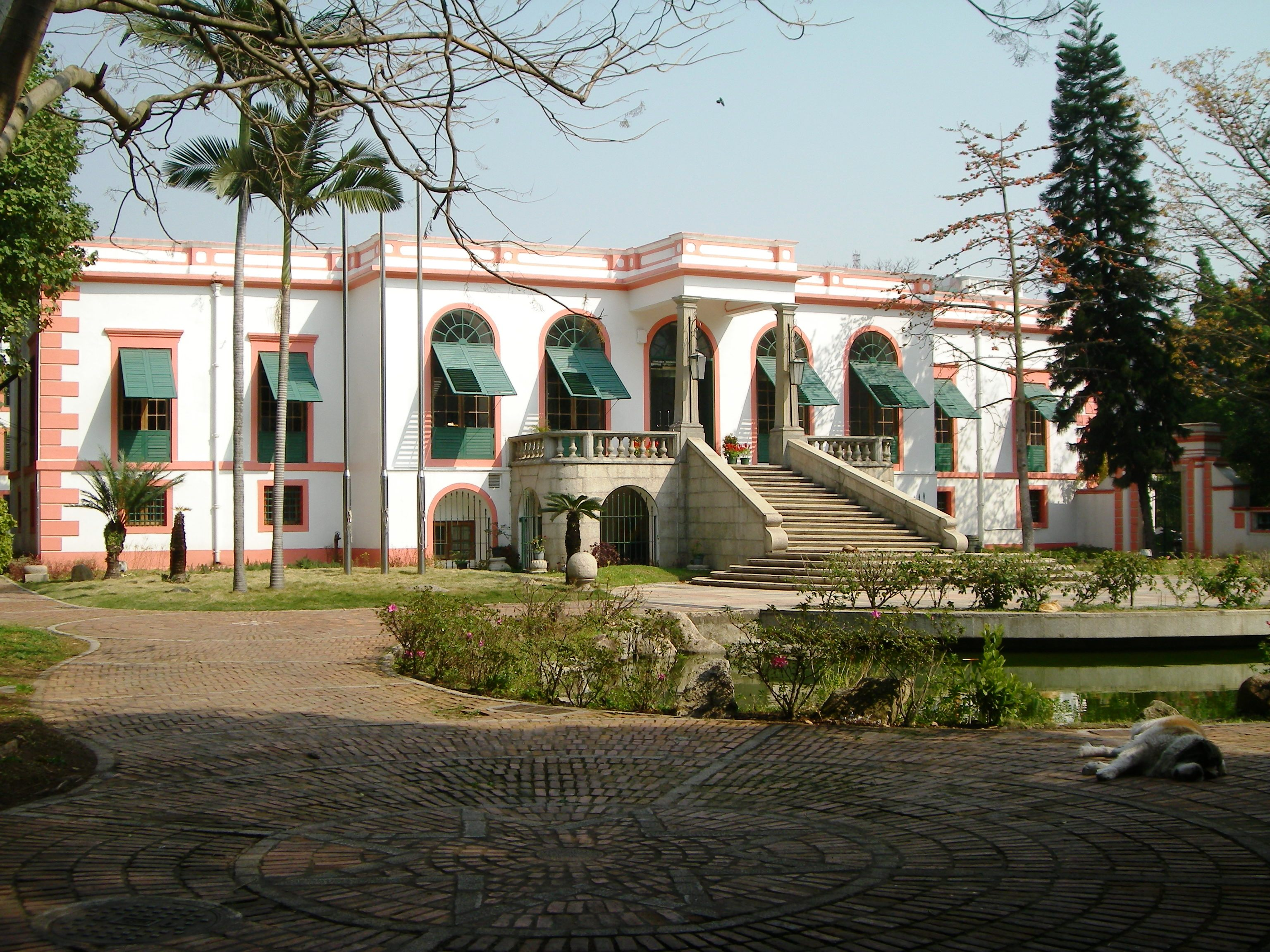
Casa Jardim

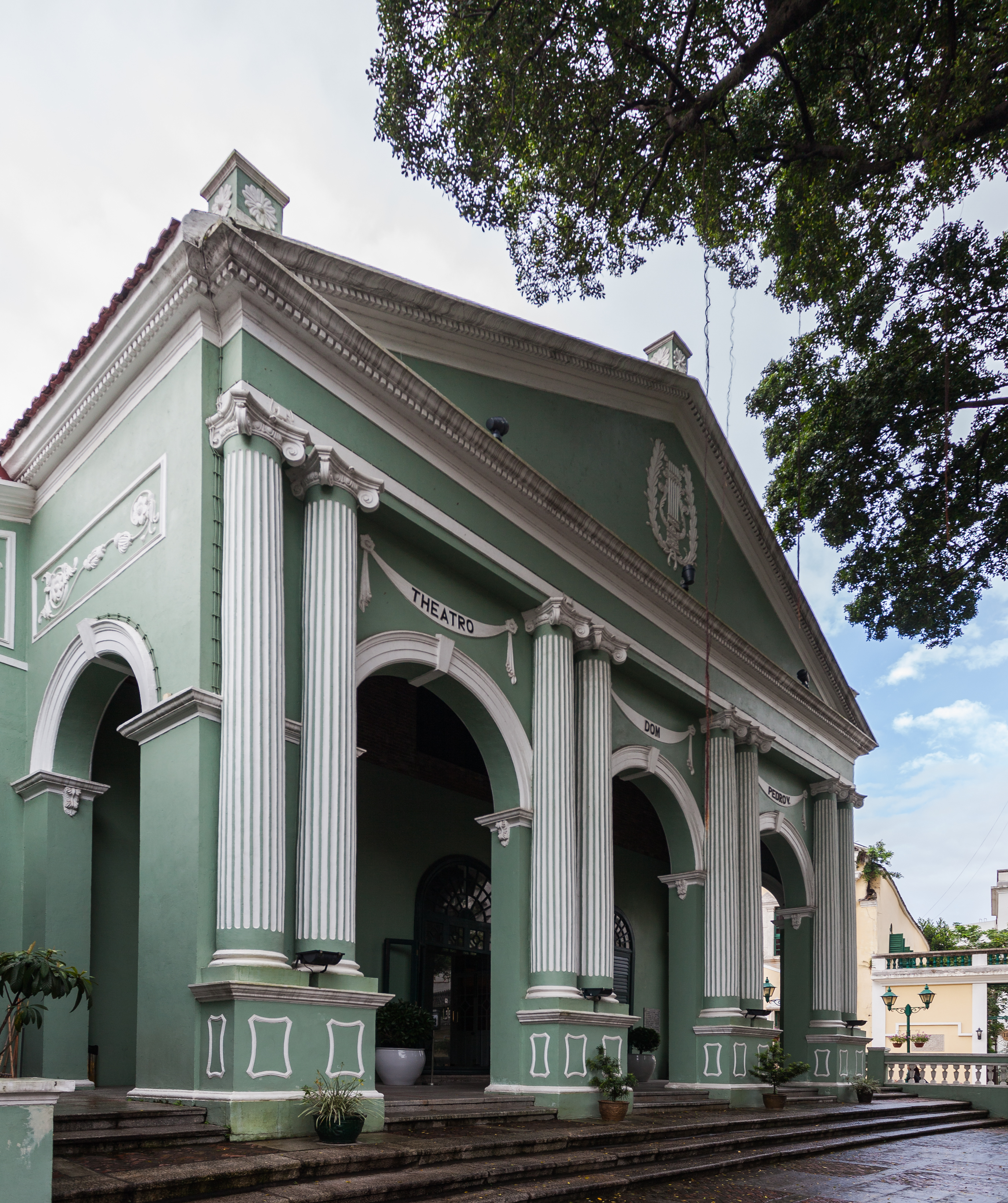
Dom Pedro V theater

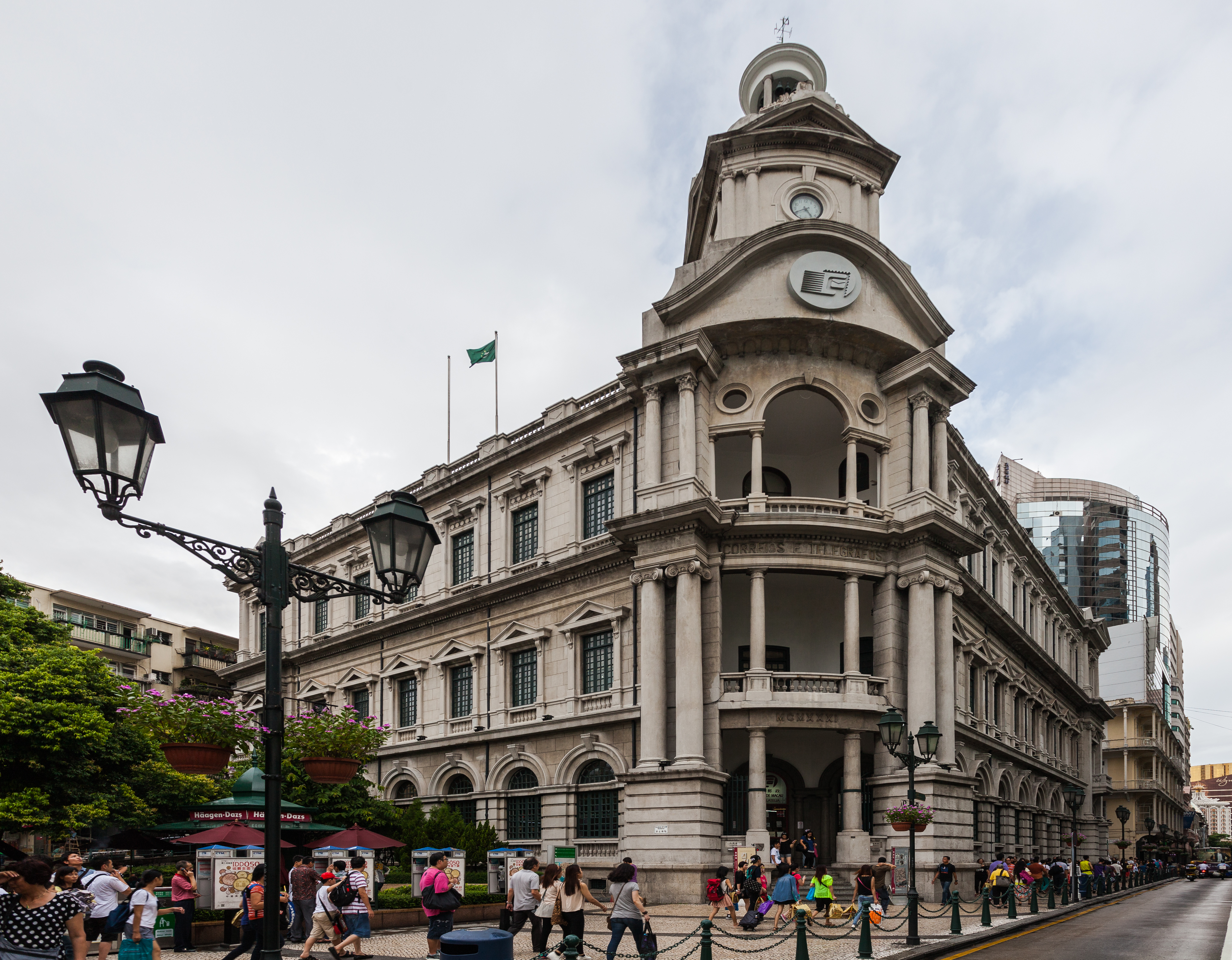
Post office of Macau

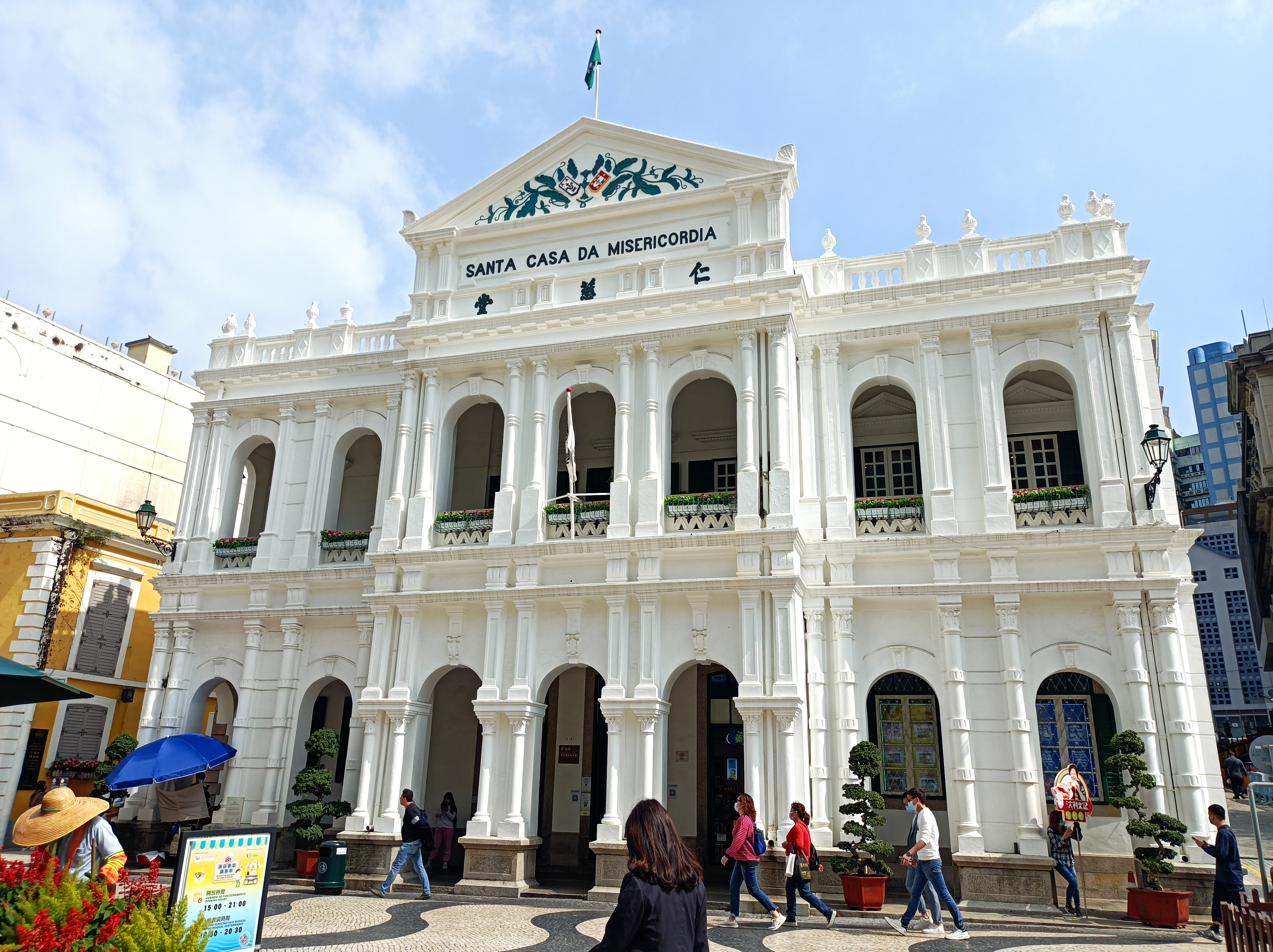
Headquarters of the Misericórdia of Macau

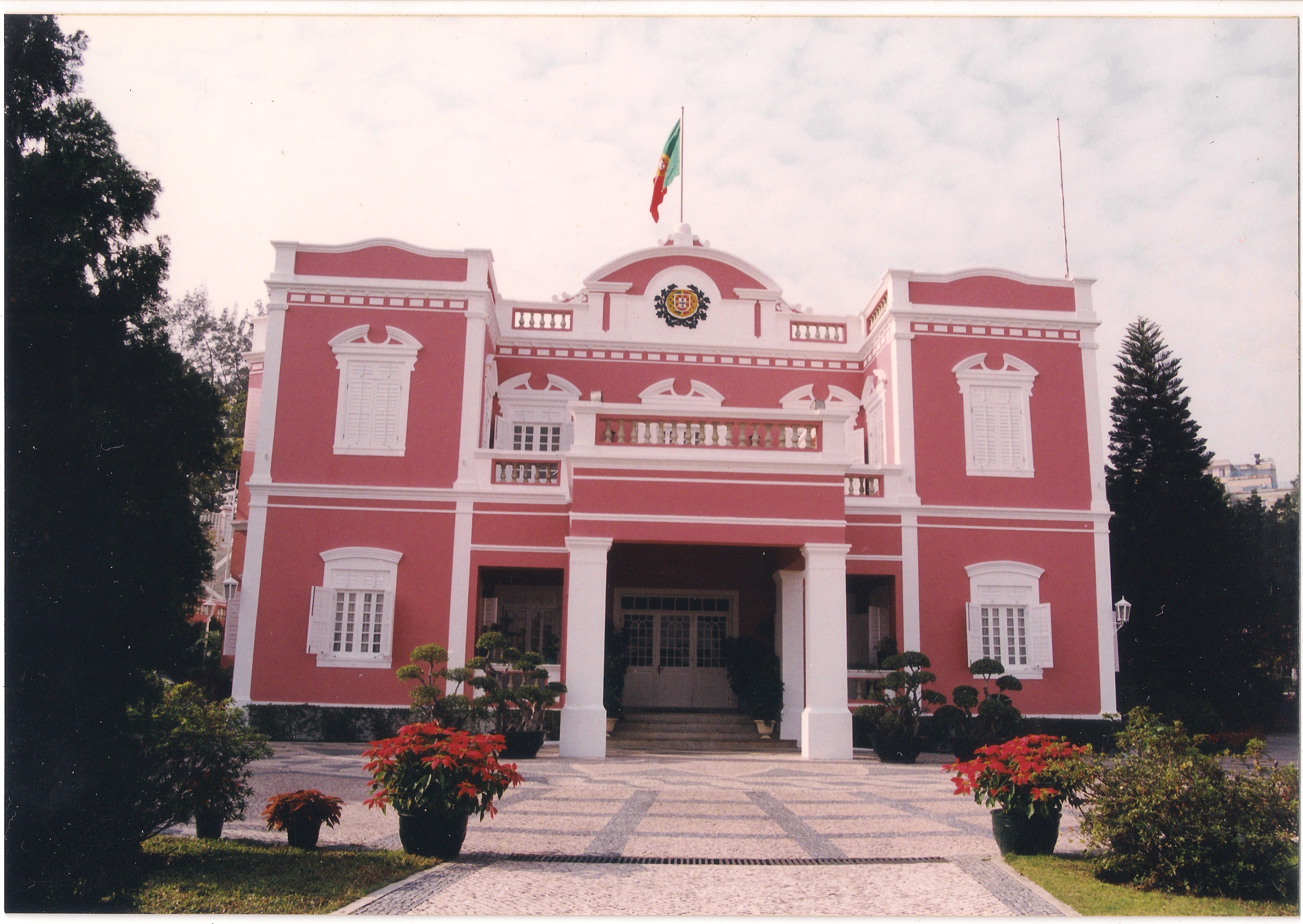
Santa Sancha Palace

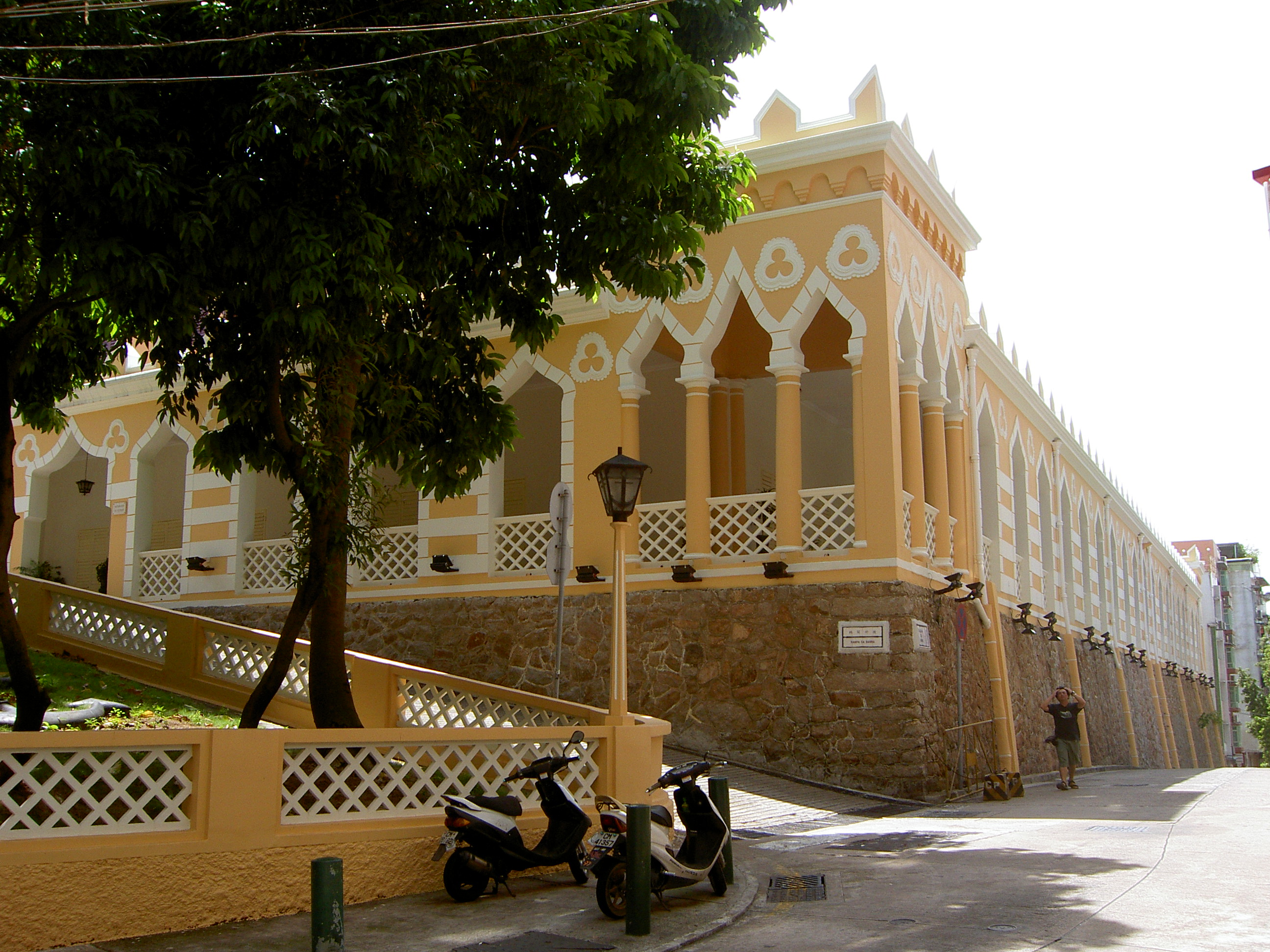
Quartel dos Mouros, Neo-Arabesque former Portuguese barracks

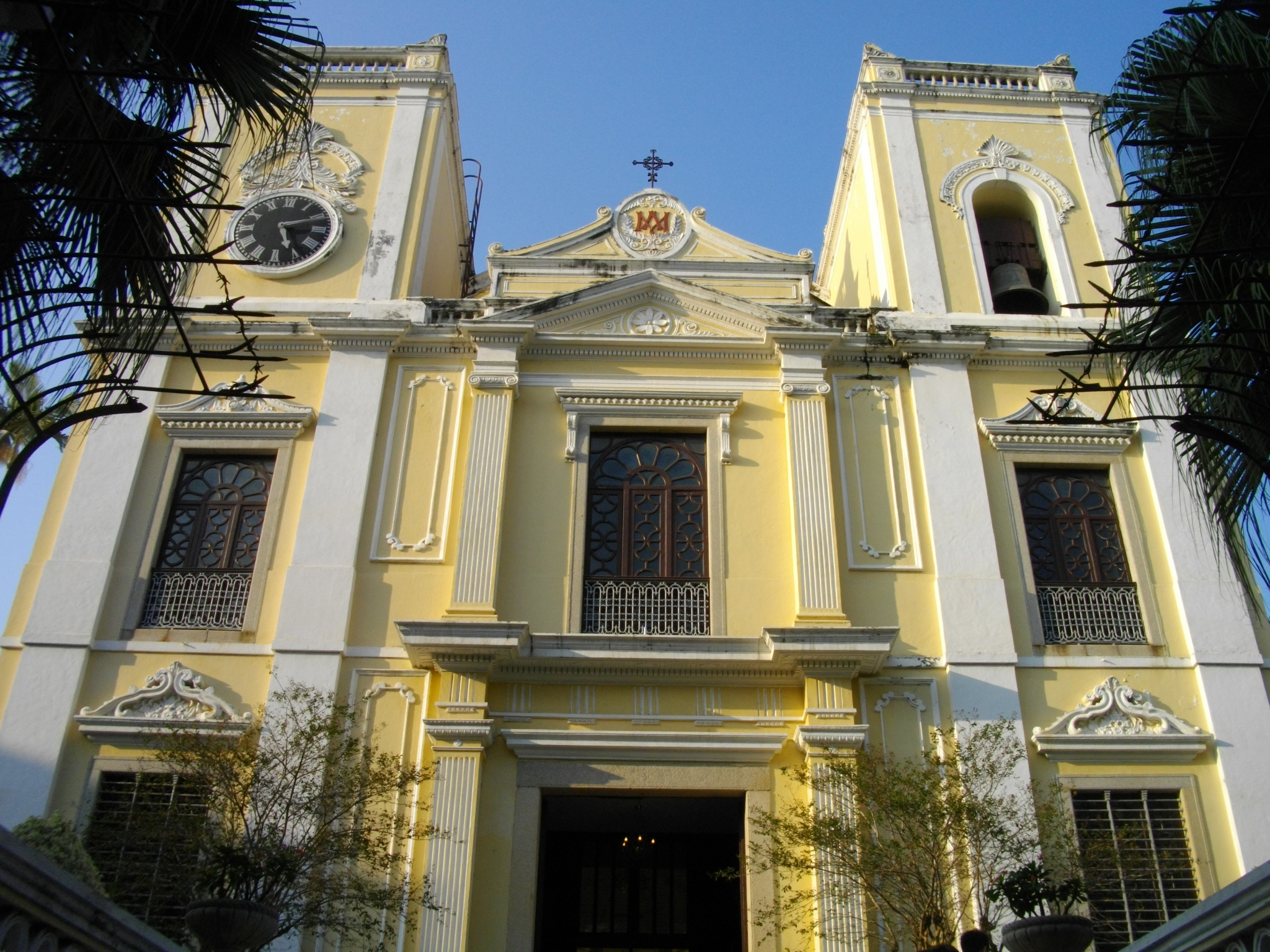
São Lourenço Church

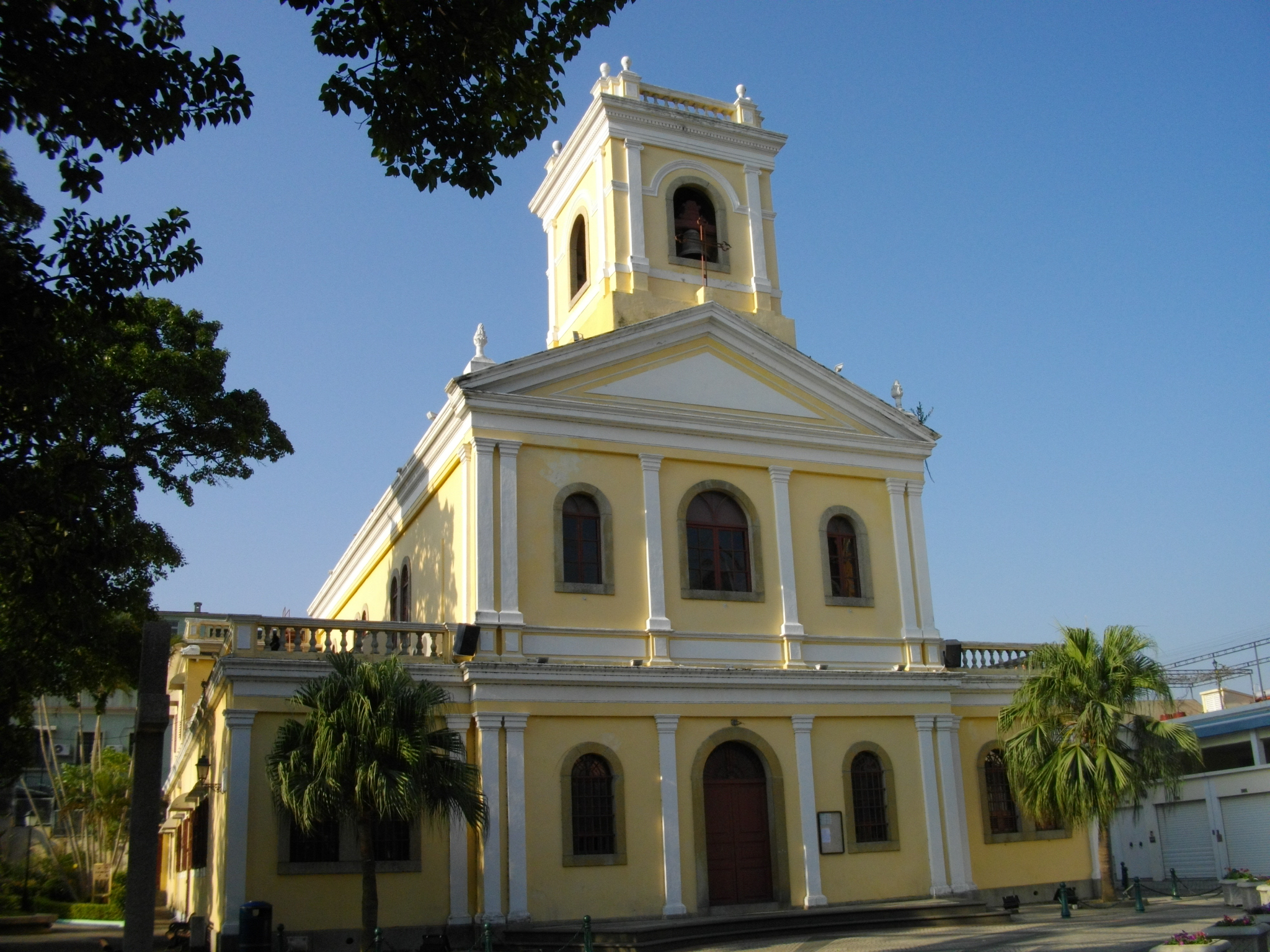
Nossa Senhora do Carmo Church

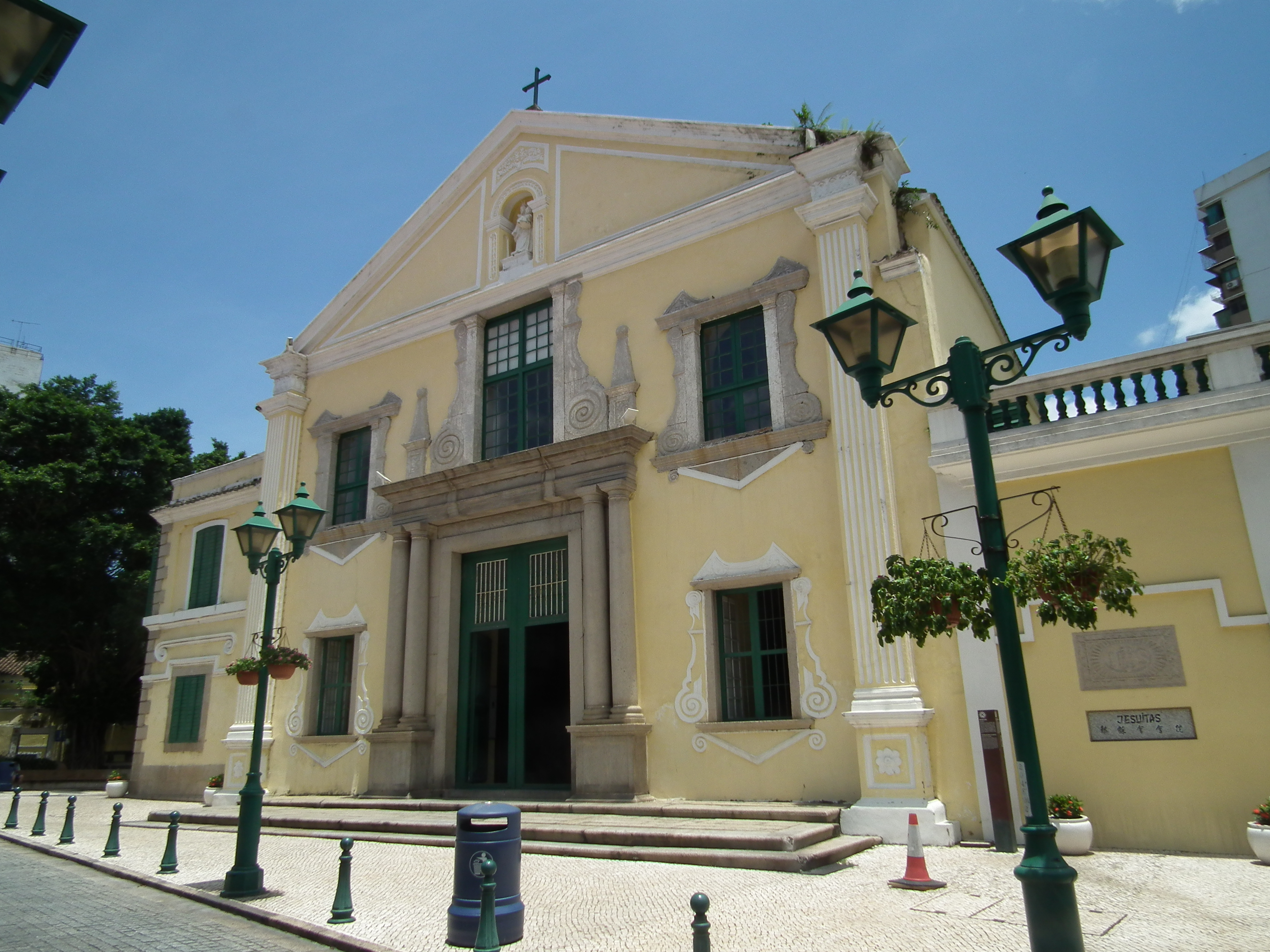
Santo Agostinho Church

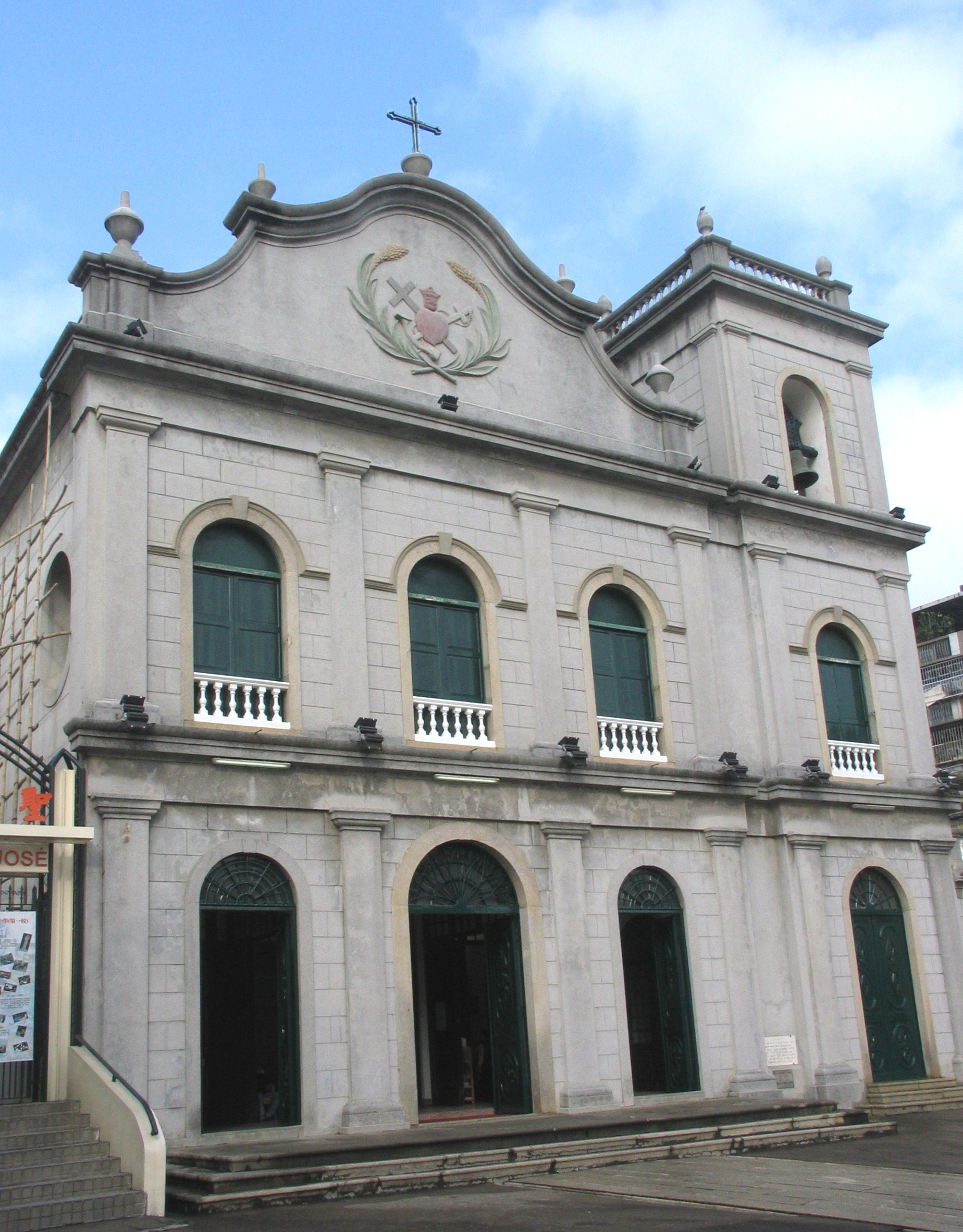
São Lázaro Church

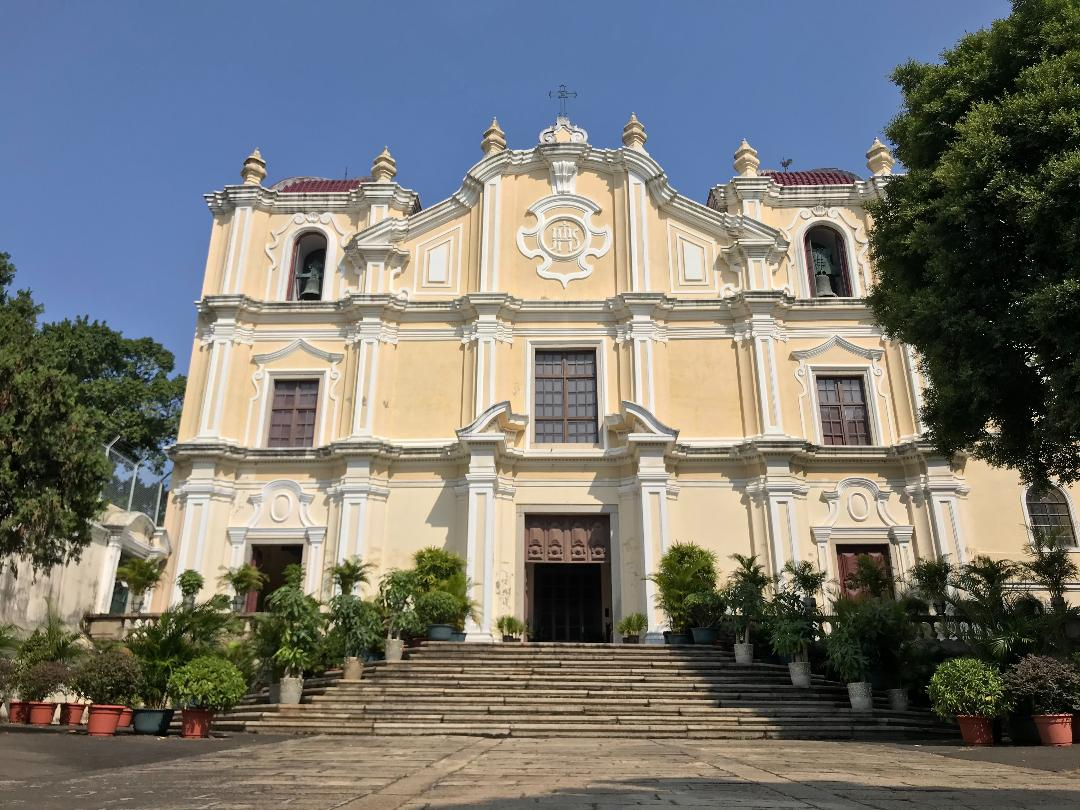
São José Seminar

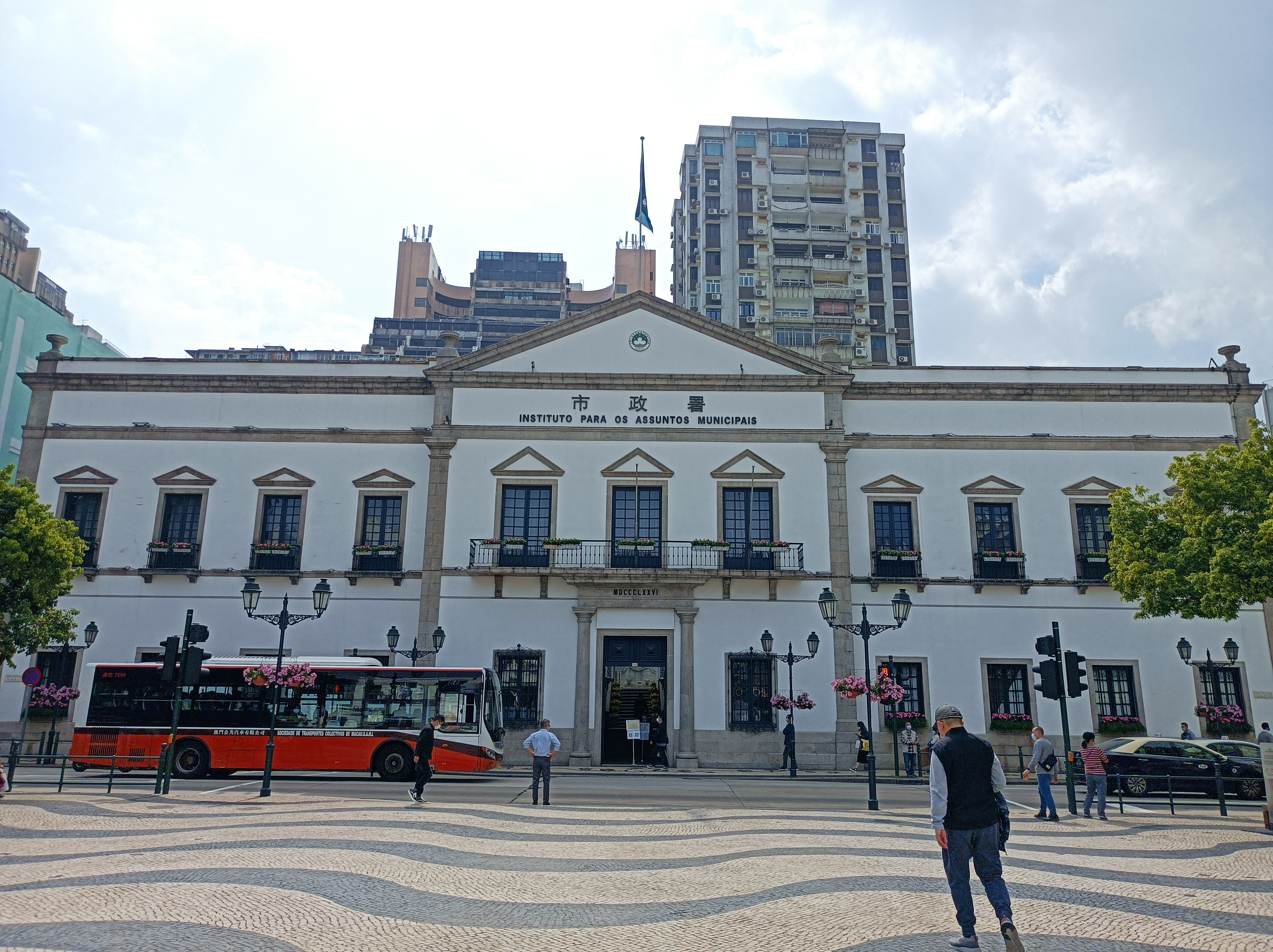
Former building of the Senate of Macau

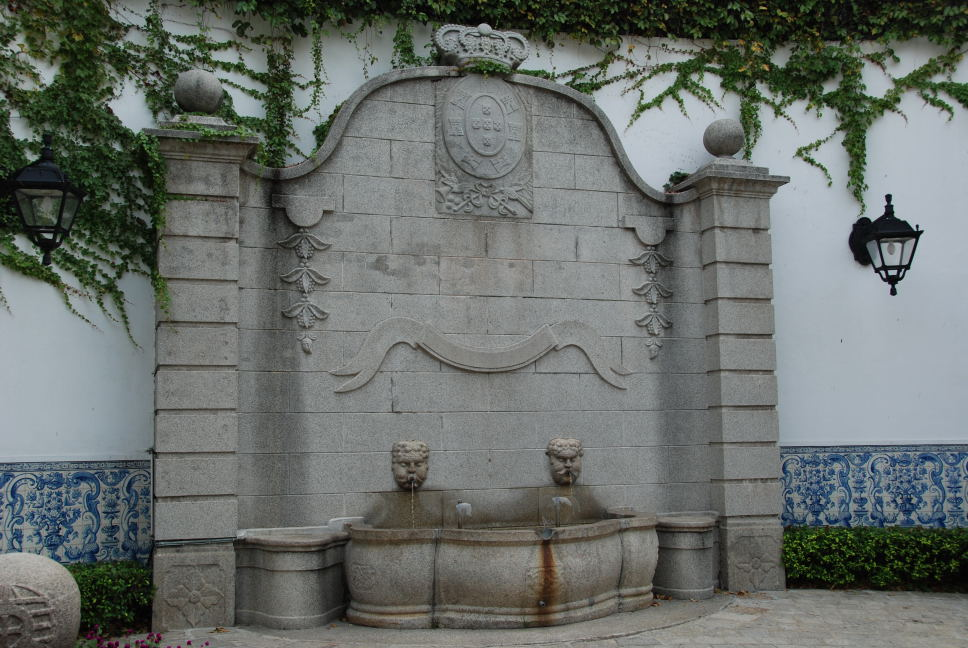
Portuguese fountain at Dr. Soares Street

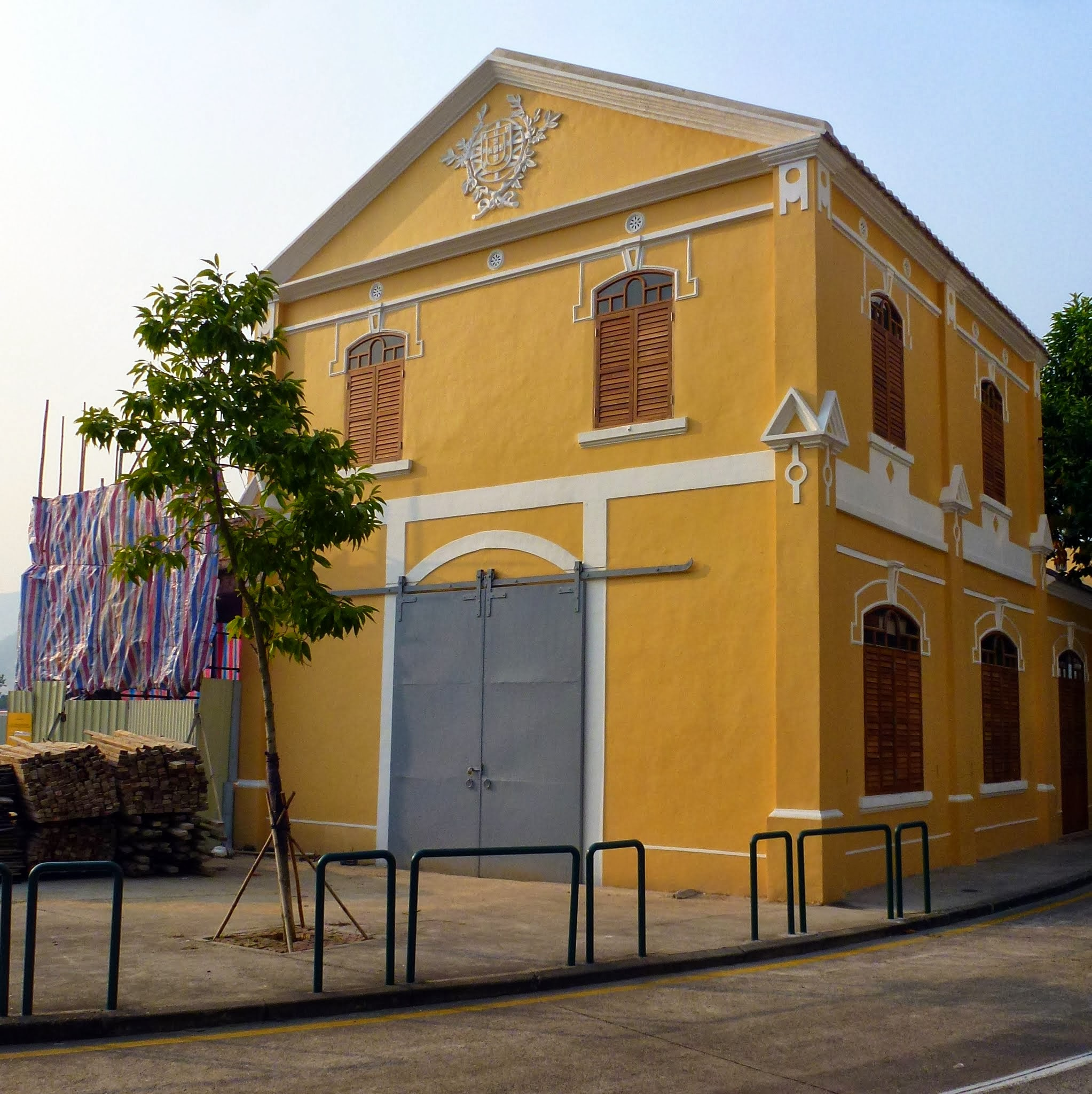
Former Portuguese warehouse

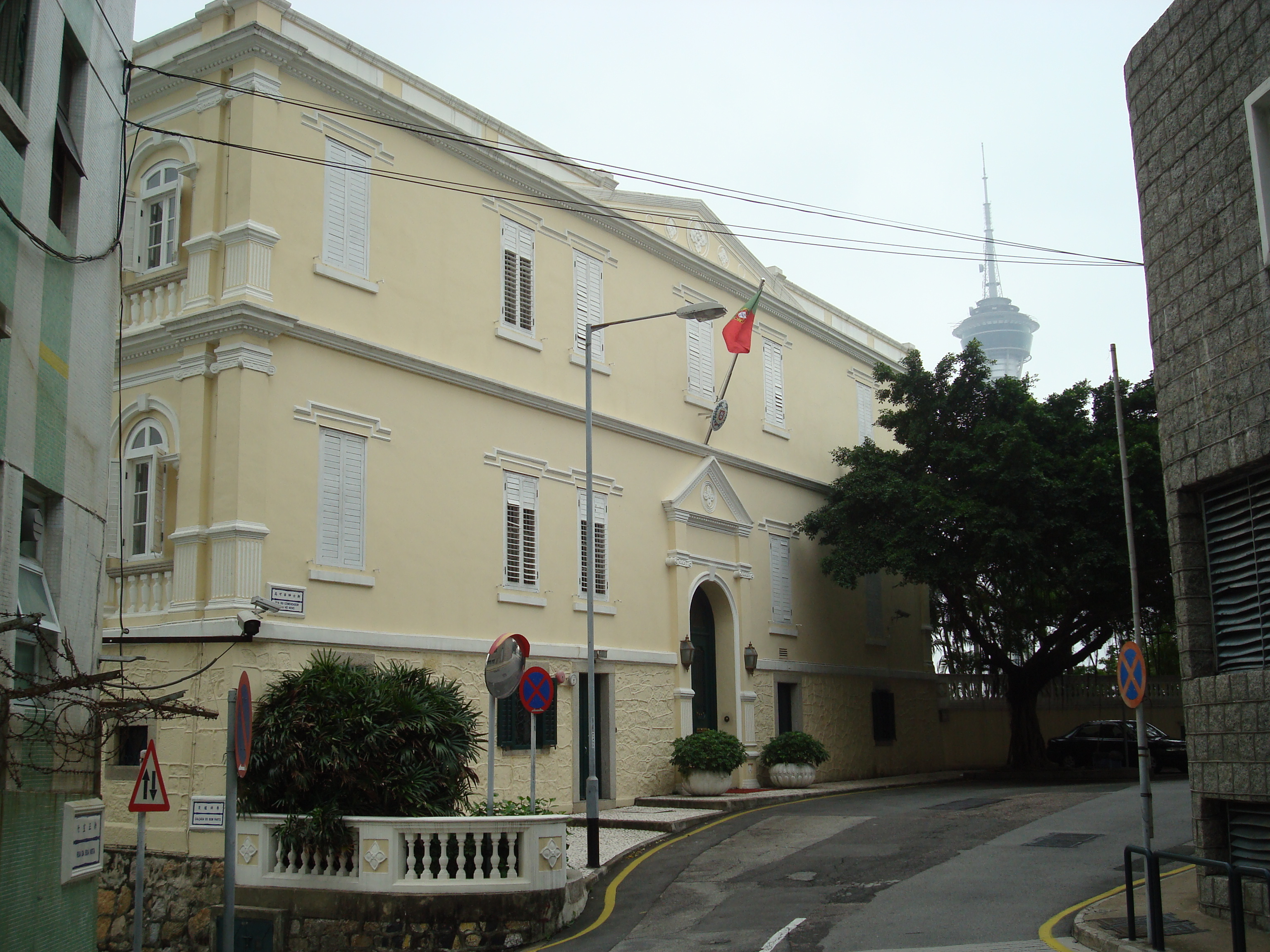
Portuguese Consulate at Macau

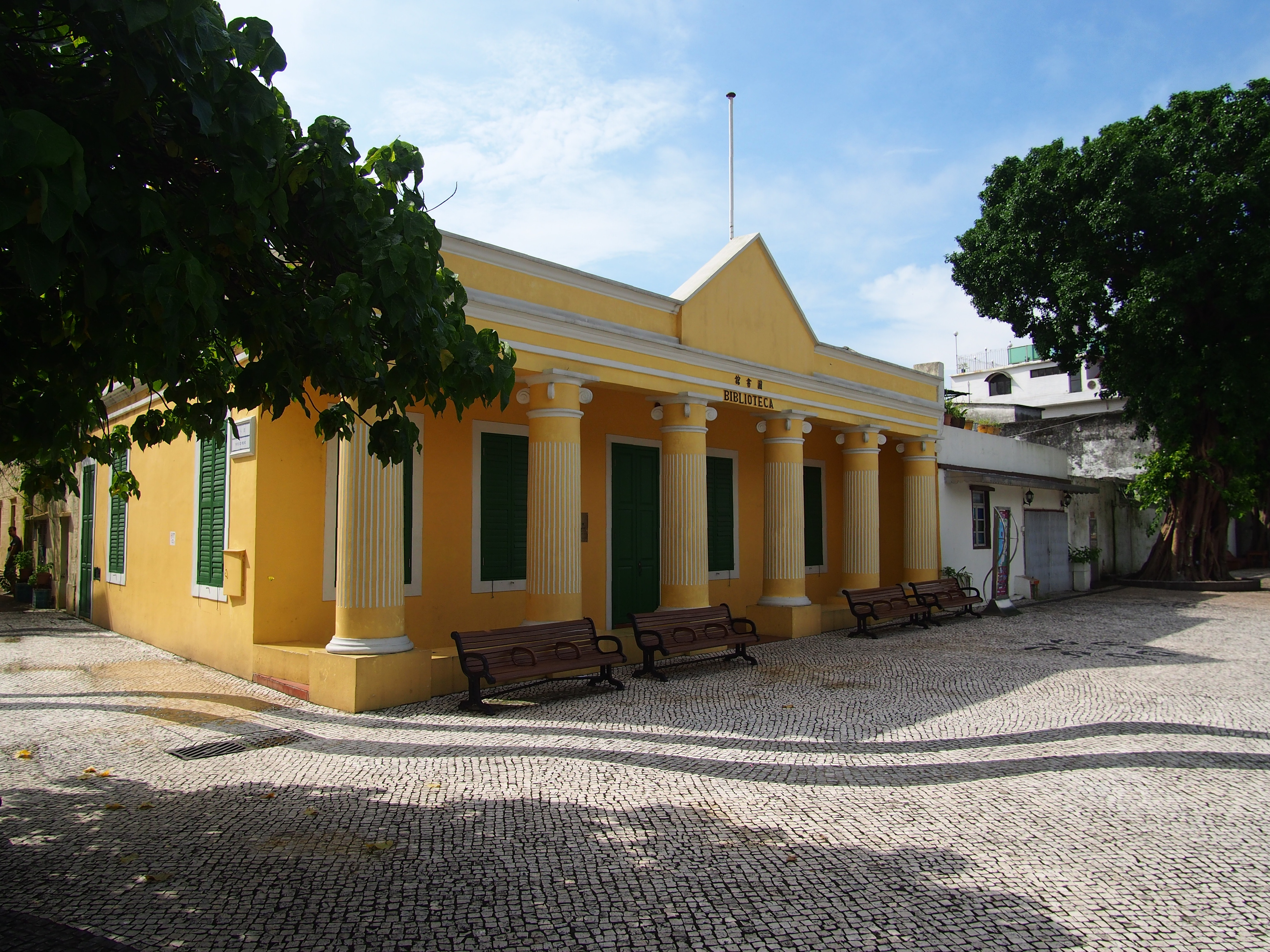
Coloane library

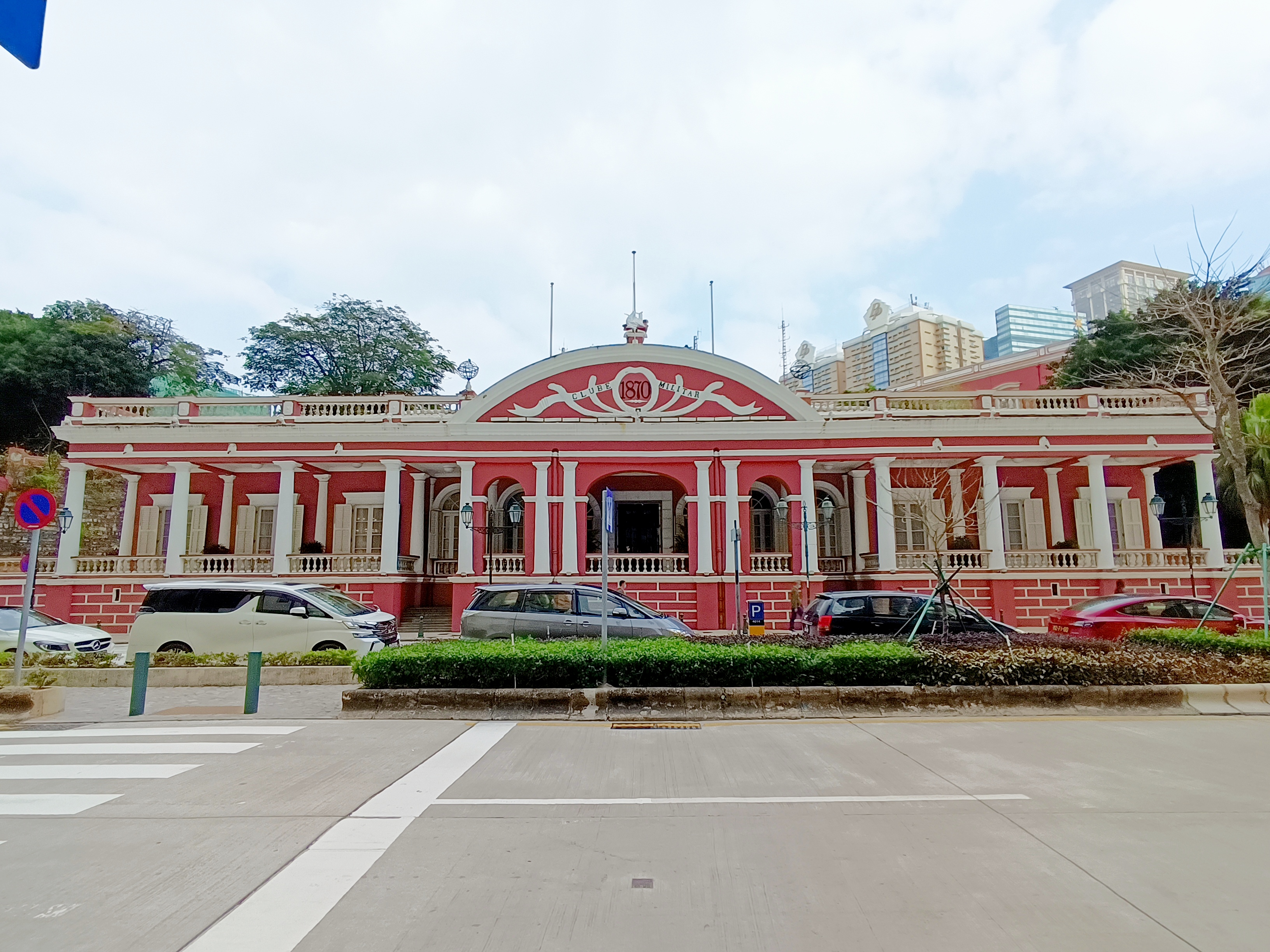
Clube Militar

=== Currency ===
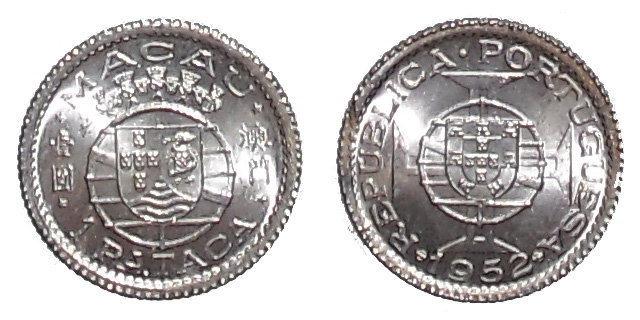
1952 Macanese 1 pataca

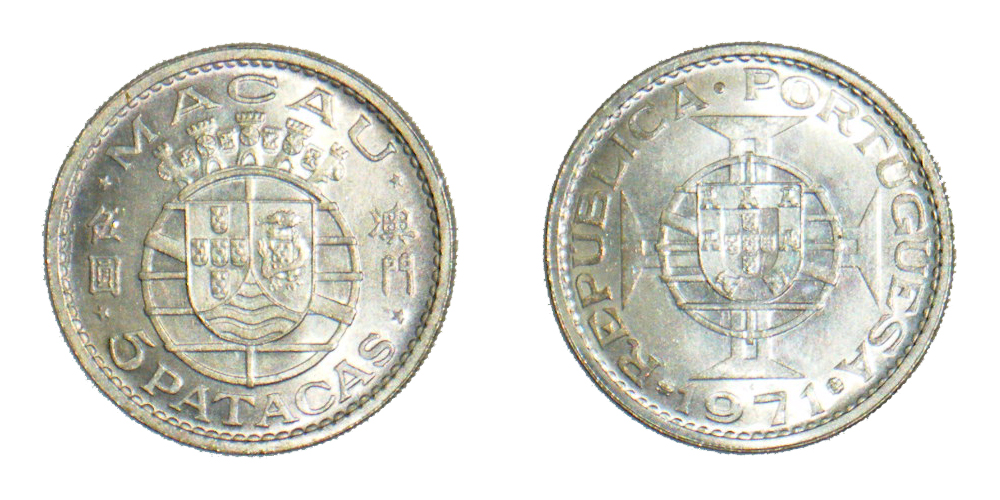
1971 Macanese 5 patacas

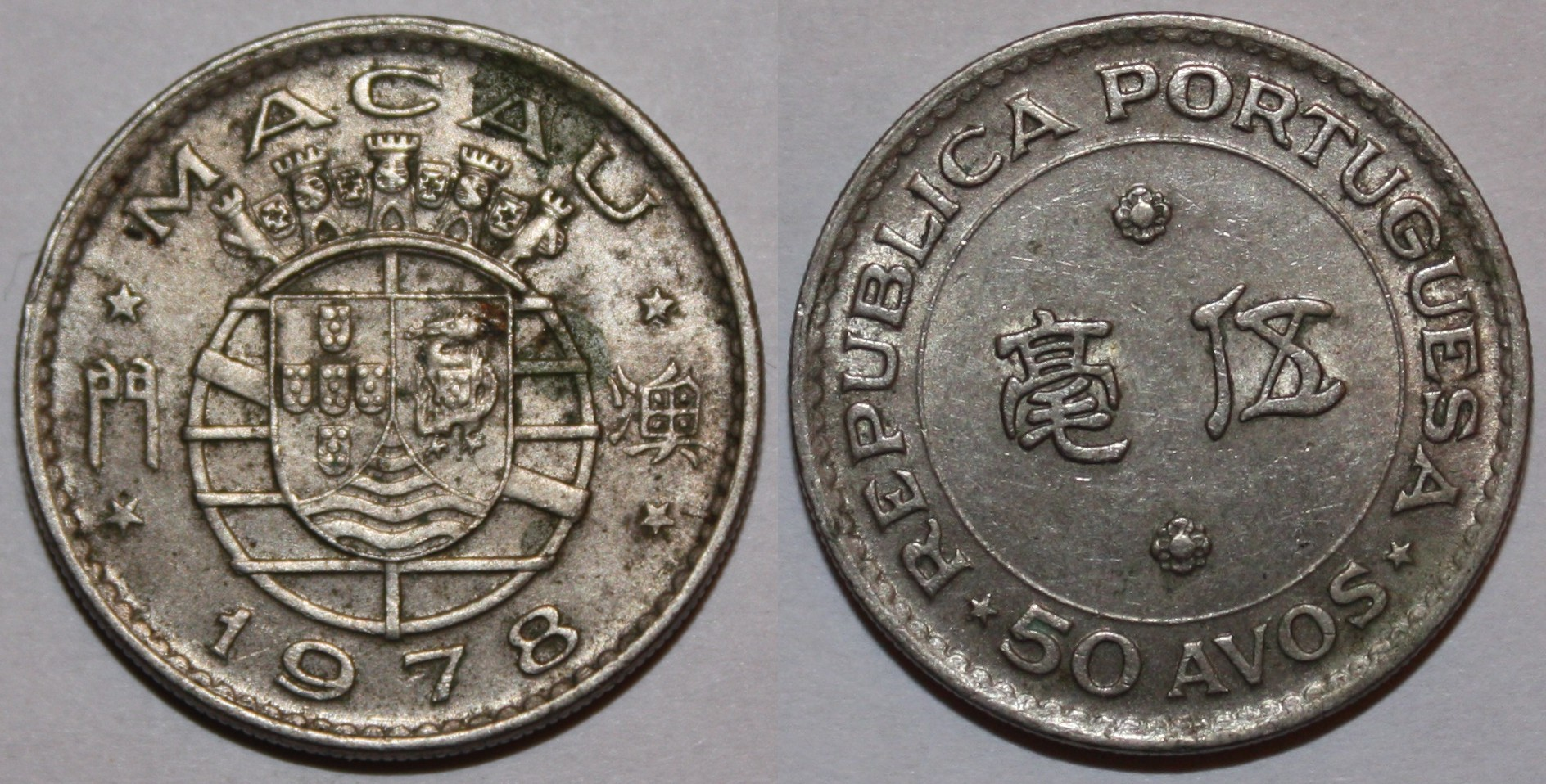
1978 Macanese 50 avos

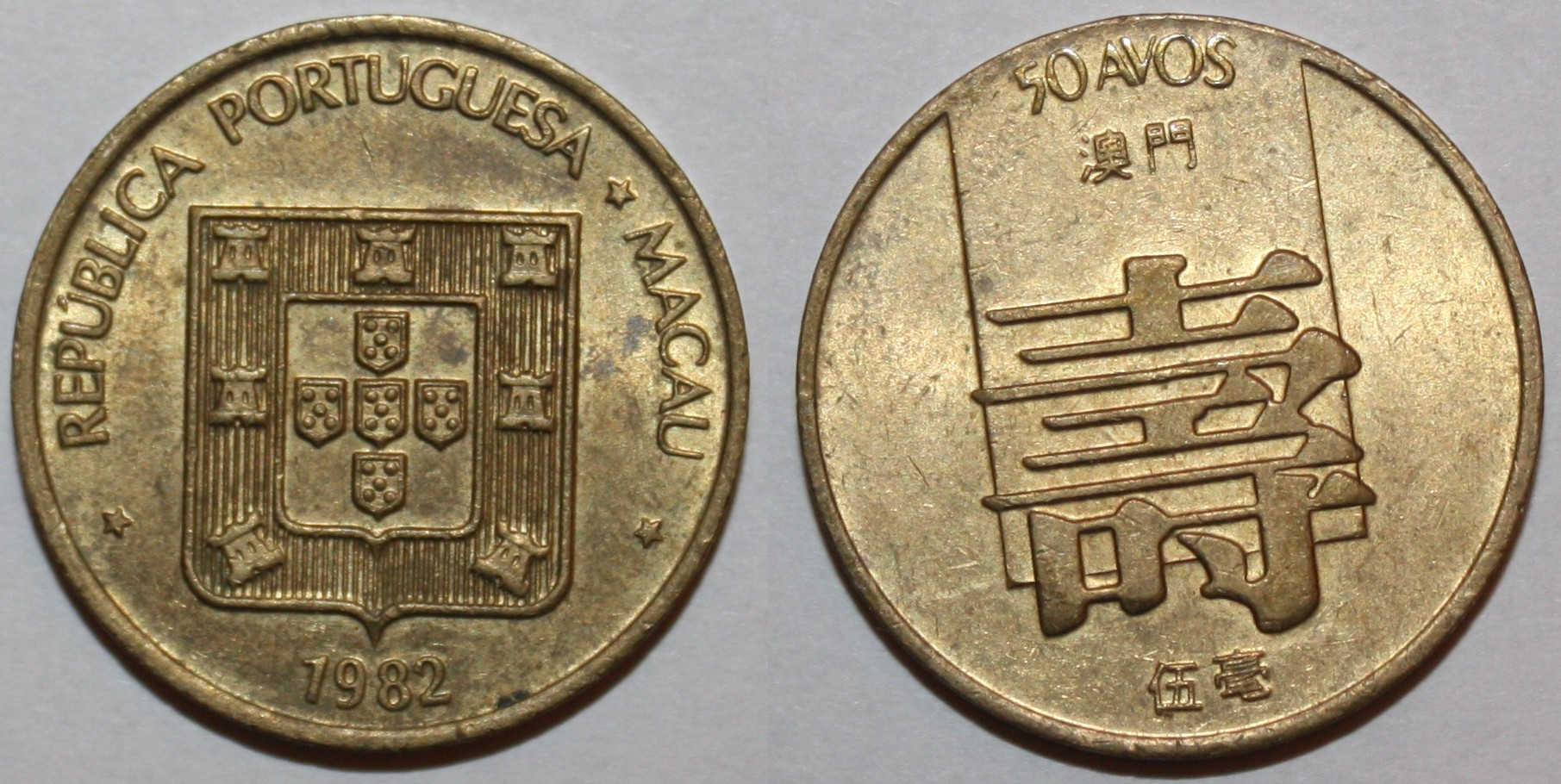
1982 Macanese 50 avos

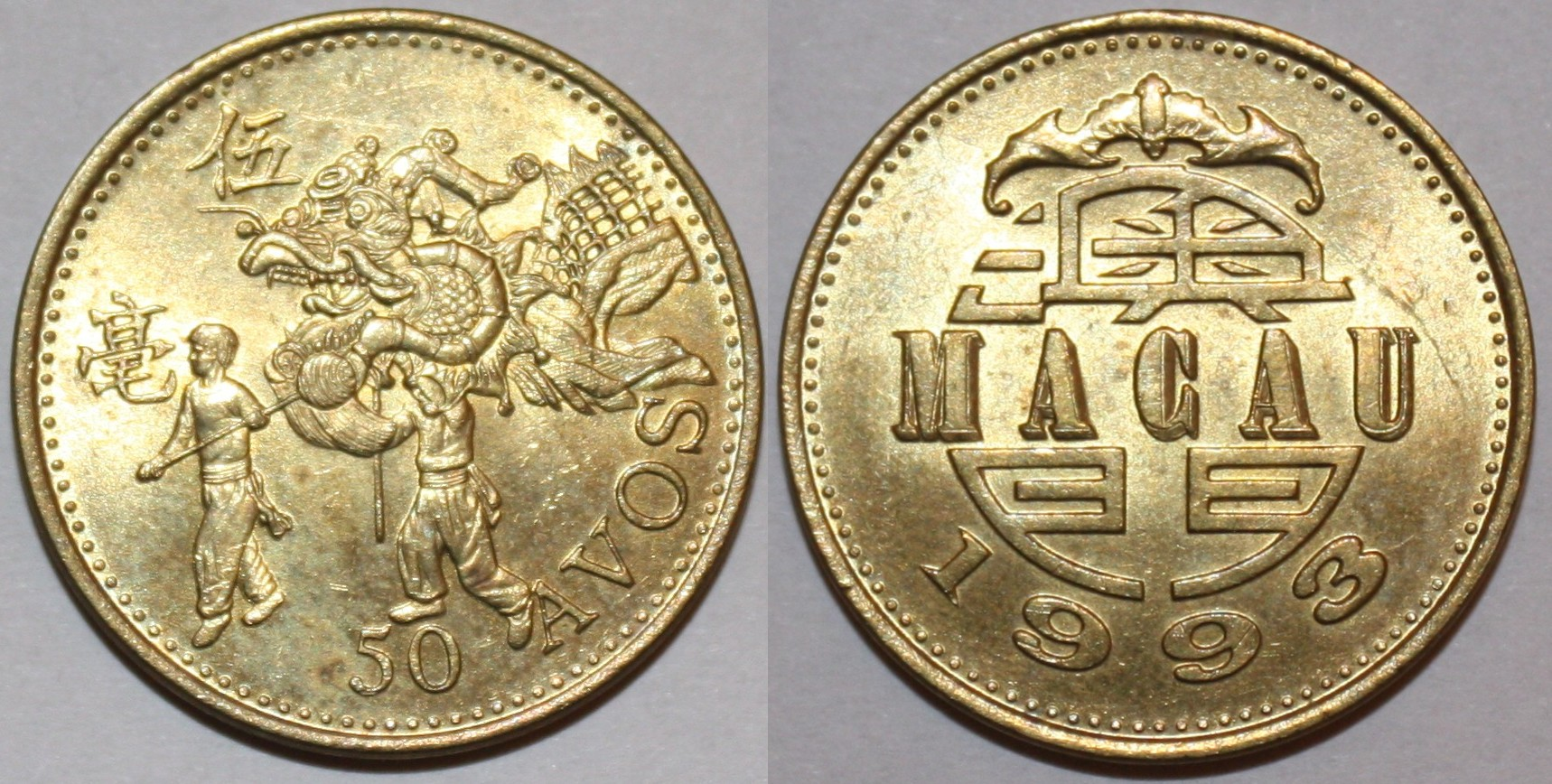
1993 Macanese 50 avos

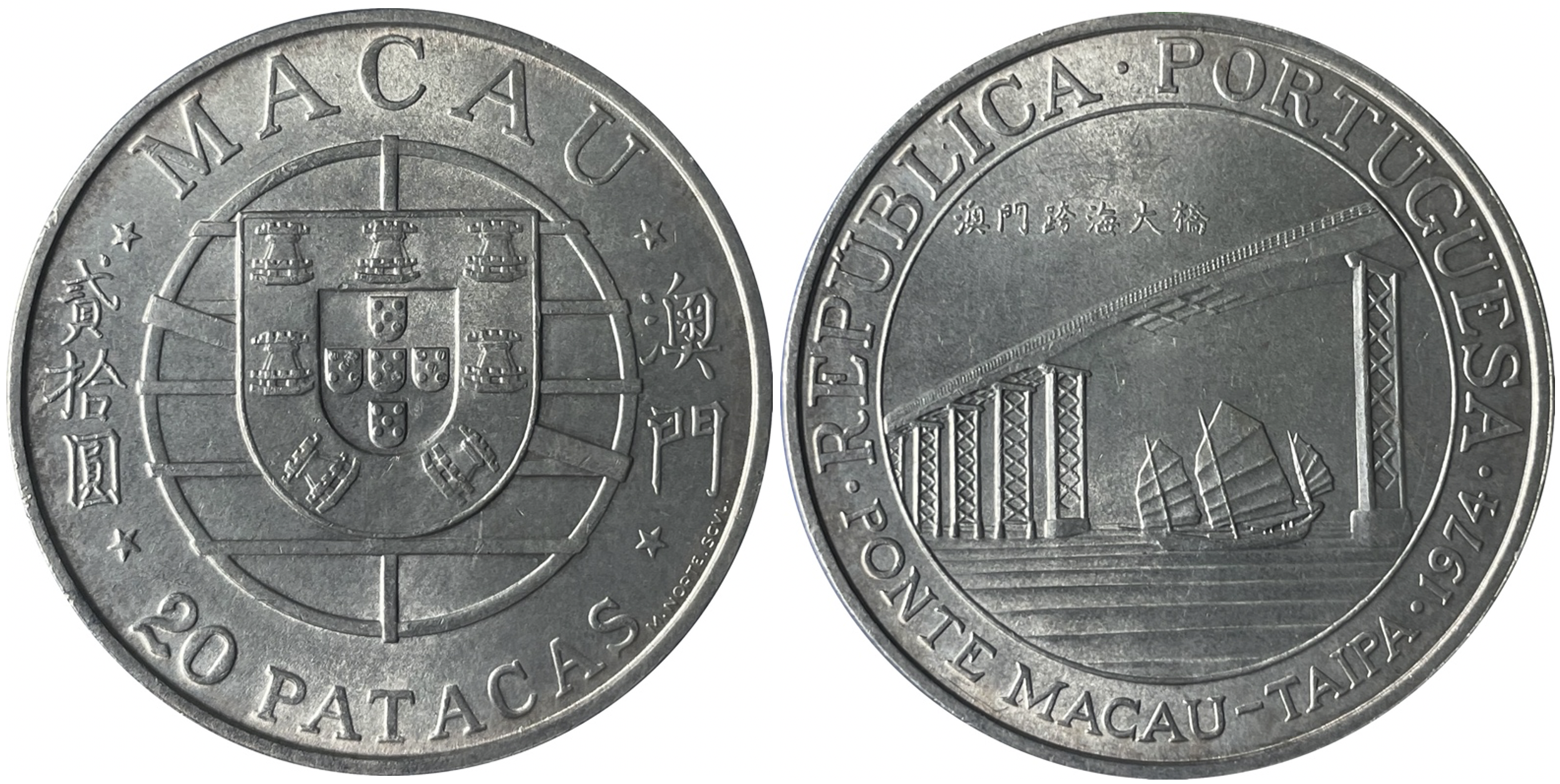
Macanese 20 patacas

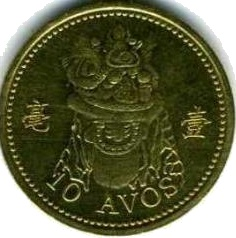
Macanese 10 avos

=== Vexillology ===
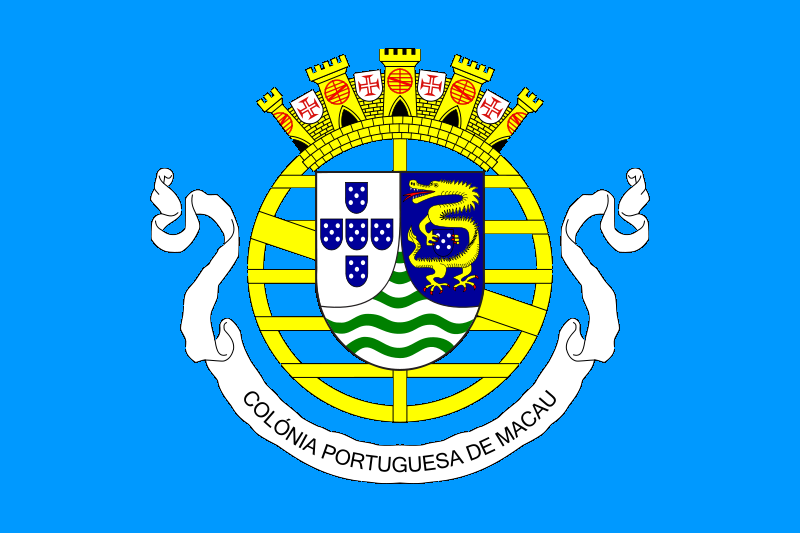
Flag of the government of Macau (1935–1951)

Flag of the government of Macau (1951–1976)

Flag of the government of Macau (1976–1999)

1932 proposal for the flag of Macau

1965 proposal for the flag of Macau

=== Heraldry ===
Oldest known coat of arms of Macau

Coat of arms of Macau from the late nineteen century till 1935

Lesser coat of arms of Macau (1935–1999)

Proposed coat of arms of Portuguese Macau, never adopted

== See also ==
- Arquivo Histórico Ultramarino, archives in Lisbon documenting the Portuguese Empire, including Macau
- British Hong Kong (1841–1997)
- British Weihaiwei (1898–1930)
- El Piñal
- China–Portugal relations
- Leased Territory of Guangzhouwan (1898–1945), French leased territory in China, administered as a part of Indochina
- Military of Macau under Portuguese rule
- Portuguese Empire
- Chinese people in Portugal

== Bibliography ==
- Cardinal, Paulo (2009). "The Judicial Guarantees of Fundamental Rights in the Macau Legal System". In One Country, Two Systems, Three Legal Orders – Perspectives of Evolution: Essays on Macau's Autonomy After the Resumption of Sovereignty by China. Berlin: Springer. ISBN 978-3-540-68572-2.
- Diffie, Bailey W. (1977), Foundations of the Portuguese Empire: 1415 - 1580, University of Minnesota Press.
- Fei, Chengkang (1996). Macao 400 Years. Translated by Wang Yintong and Sarah K. Schneewind. Shanghai: Shanghai Academy of Social Sciences.
- Halis, Denis de Castro (2015). "'Post-Colonial' Legal Interpretation in Macau, China: Between European and Chinese Influences". In East Asia's Renewed Respect for the Rule of Law in the 21st Century. Leiden: Brill Nijhoff. ISBN 978-90-04-27420-4.
- Hao, Zhidong (2011). Macao History and Society. Hong Kong: Hong Kong University Press. ISBN 978-988-8028-54-2.
- Mendes, Carmen Amado (2013). Portugal, China and the Macau Negotiations, 1986–1999. Hong Kong: Hong Kong University Press. ISBN 978-988-8139-00-2.
- Wills, John E. (2011), China and Maritime Europe, 1500–1800: Trade, Settlement, Diplomacy, and Missions, Cambridge University Press.
