= List of Hong Kong flags =

This is a list of flags used in Hong Kong.

== Official flag ==
Flag	Date	Use	Description
	1997–present	Flag of Hong Kong	A white, five-petal Bauhinia × blakeana on a red field with a star on each of the petals.
	1997–present	Flag of Hong Kong (vertical)	

== Police flags ==
Flag	Date	Use	Description
	1997–present	Flag of the Hong Kong Police Force	Police emblem on navy blue background.
	1967–1997	Flag of the Royal Hong Kong Police	Police emblem on navy blue background.
	1967–1997	Ensign of the Royal Hong Kong Police	Blue ensign with the old police emblem.

== Corrections Service Department flags ==
Flag	Date	Use	Description
	1997–present	Flag of the Hong Kong Correctional Services	A vertical bicolour of blue and yellow, with a central badge. The overall proportions are 2:3.
Link to file	1982–1997	Flag of the Hong Kong Correctional Services	A vertical bicolour of blue and yellow, with a central badge. The overall proportions are 2:3.

== Customs and Excise Department flags ==
Flag	Date	Use	Description
	1997–present	Flag of the Customs and Excise Department	Badge on a green background
Link to file	?–1997	Flag of the Customs and Excise Department	Badge on a green background

== Fire Services Department flags ==
Flag	Date	Use	Description
	1997–present	Flag of the Hong Kong Fire Services Department	Badge on a red background
Link to file	1988–1997	Flag of the Hong Kong Fire Services Department	Badge on a red background

== Immigration Department flags ==
Flag	Date	Use	Description
	1997–present	Flag of the Immigration Department	Badge on a navy blue background
Link to file	1988–1997	Flag of the Immigration Department	Badge on a navy blue background

== Medical Service flags ==
Flag	Date	Use	Description
	1997–present	Flag of the Auxiliary Medical Service	Badge on a navy blue background
Link to file	1950–1997	Flag of the Auxiliary Medical Service	Badge on a navy blue background

== Civil Aid Service flags ==
Flag	Date	Use	Description
	2003–present	Flag of the Civil Aid Service	Badge on a navy blue background
	1997–2003	Flag of the Civil Aid Service	Badge on a navy blue background
Link to file	1952–1997	Flag of the Civil Aid Service	Badge on a navy blue background

== Political flags ==
Flag	Date	Use	Description
current
	2020–present	The "Milk Tea Alliance" flag created by netizens.	The colours represent (from left) Thai milk tea, Hong Kong milk tea, and Taiwanese milk tea.
	2019–present	Hong Kong provisional government and independence flag	Blue represents freedom and white represents peace.
former
	2015–2020	Flag of the Hong Kong National Front	
	1920s	Flag of the China Sailors' Union (中華海員工業聯合總會), the main organizer of the Canton-Hong Kong strike.	

=== Hong Kong protest flags ===
Flag	Date	Use	Description
	2019	Black Bauhinia flag	A version of the flag of Hong Kong using black instead of red.
	2019	Black Bauhinia flag	Variant without the stars which represent the PRC.
	2019	Black Bauhinia flag	Variant with wilted petals
	2019	Black Bauhinia flag	More detailed variant of wilted petal version
	2019	Free Hong Kong flag	
	2019	Lennon Wall flag	A multicolored patchwork of squares representing the Lennon Wall's thousands of sticky notes.
	2019	Hong Kong protest banner, "Chinazi"	

== Historical flags ==
Flag	Date	Use	Description
	1990	Flag of Hong Kong	Original design of the regional flag of Hong Kong approved in 1990 by the National People Congress along with the Basic Law, never used officially.
	1985–1999	Flag of the Regional Council	A stylized Bauhinia blakeana leaf outline in green, in the form of a diagonally-tilted capital "R", on a light green background, representing the green of the leaves.
	1960s–1999	Flag of the Urban Council	A stylized Bauhinia blakeana flower outline in white on a pink background, representing the colour of the flower.
	1959–1997	Flag of the British Crown colony and later British Dependent Territory of Hong Kong	A British Blue Ensign with the coat of arms of Hong Kong (1959–1997).
	1955–1959	Flag of the British Crown colony of Hong Kong	A British Blue Ensign with local waterfront scene.
	1941–1945	Flag used during the military occupation by the Empire of Japan	Flag of Japan
	1876–1941; 1945–1955	Flag of the British Crown colony of Hong Kong	A British Blue Ensign with local waterfront scene.
	1871–1876	Flag of the British Crown colony of Hong Kong	A British Blue Ensign with a crowned "HK".
	1890–1898	Flag of the Qing dynasty	The second variant (rectangular) of the Qing flag. The New Territories was Qing territory before 1898.
	1862–1890	Flag of the Qing dynasty	The first variant (triangular) of the Qing flag. The New Territories was Qing territory before 1898. The Qing Empire had no official flags between 1636 and 1862.
	1843–1868	Flag of United Kingdom	The Union Jack flew during the initial possession of the colony in 1841 and seal found in the 1870 flag was used by the Government beginning in 1843.
	1514–1521	Flag of the Kingdom of Portugal	Portuguese navy occupied Tamão (present-day Tuen Mun, Lantau and Kwai Chung) in 1514.

=== Royal and Imperial standards in Hong Kong ===
Flag	Date	Use	Description
	1960–1997	Personal flag of Elizabeth II, used by the Queen in her capacity as Head of the Commonwealth	A crowned letter 'E' in gold, surrounded by a garland of gold roses on a blue background.
	1941–1945	Imperial standard of the emperor of Japan	A gold sixteen petal chrysanthemum centered on a red background.
	1841–1941; 1945–1997	The royal standard of the United Kingdom	A banner of the King's arms, the royal coat of arms of the United Kingdom.
	1862–1898	Standard of the Qing emperor	Azure Dragon on a plain right triangle yellow field with the red sun of the three-legged crow in the upper hoist corner.

=== Governor of Hong Kong ===
Flag	Date	Use	Description
	1910–1941; 1945–1955	Flag of the governor of Hong Kong	
	1955–1959	Flag of the governor of Hong Kong	
	1959–1997	Flag of the governor of Hong Kong	

=== Royal Hong Kong Regiment ===
Flag	Date	Use	Description
	?–1995	King's Colour of the Hong Kong Volunteer Defence Corps (HKVDC). Used as stand in for the Hong Kong Defence Force	
	?–1995	Regimental Colour of the HKVDC. Used as stand in for the Hong Kong Defence Force	
	?–1995	Camp flag of the Royal Hong Kong Regiment (The Volunteers)	
	1951–1995	Regimental Guidon of the Royal Hong Kong Regiment (The Volunteers)	

== Proposed flags ==
Flag	Date	Use	Description
	1988	Proposal 1	
	1988	Proposal 2	
	1988	Proposal 3	
	1988	Proposal 4	
	1988	Proposal 5	
	1988	Proposal 6	
	1988	Proposal 7	
	1988	Proposal 8	
	1988	Proposal 9	
	1988	Proposal 10	
	1988	Proposal 11	
	1988	Proposal 12	
	1988	Proposal 13	
	1988	Proposal 14	
	1988	Proposal 15	
	1988	Proposal 16	

== Hong Kong shipping companies ==
Flag	Date	Use	Description
	1883–1987	Douglas Steamship Company	
	1865–1958	Hong Kong, Canton & Macao Steamboat Company	
	1873–1974	Indo-China Steam Navigation Company Ltd.	

== See also ==
- List of Macanese flags
