= Black Bauhinia flag =

Flag used in the 2019–2020 Hong Kong protests

- Proportion: 2:3
- Adopted: 2019
- Designed by: Netizens of Hong Kong

The Black Bauhinia flag (Chinese: 黑洋紫荊旗; Jyutping: hak1 joeng4 zi2 ging1 kei4; Cantonese Yale: hāk yèuhng jí gīng kèih) is a variant of the flag of Hong Kong with a black background and (in most versions) a modified bauhinia flower. The flag gained popularity during the 2019–2020 Hong Kong protests and is often displayed by pro-democracy protesters.

== Design ==
There are five variants of the design: the basic design, which simply swaps out the red background for black, a variant of the black flag that omits the stars in the petals that symbolize the People's Republic of China, two variants where a few petals are withered, and a fifth variant of the withered flag where the petals are also bloodstained, symbolizing violence and police brutality.

Hong Kong flag variant, with black background

Hong Kong flag variant, without the stars that represent the PRC

Hong Kong flag variant, with wilted petals

Hong Kong flag variant, with detailed wilted petal version

Hong Kong flag variant, partially without petals

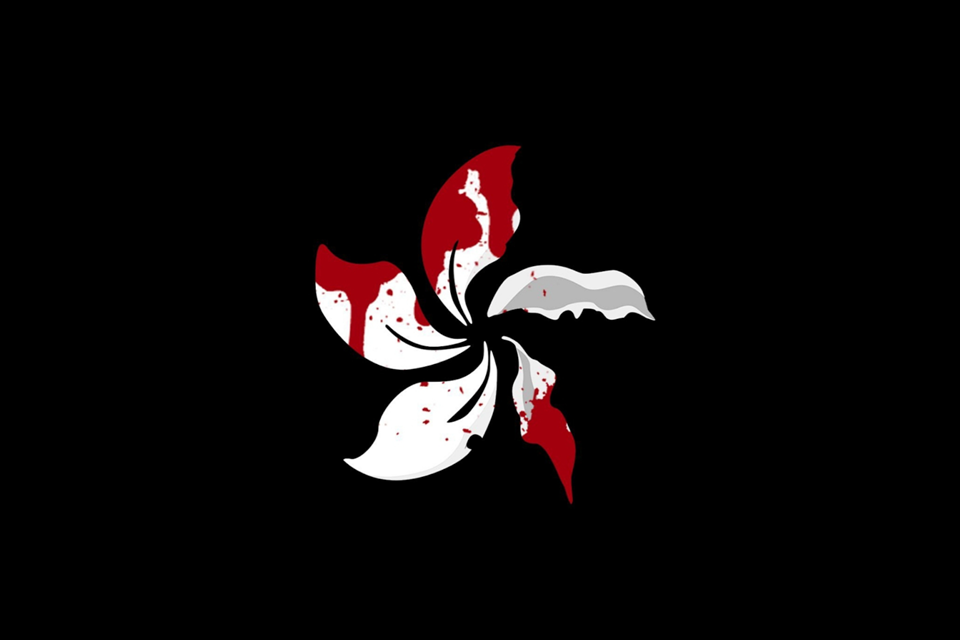
Hong Kong flag variant, with wilted bloodstained petals

== Usage ==
Protesters occupying the Legislative Council chamber, with a Black Bauhinia flag visible in the background

The flag was displayed during the storming and occupation of the Legislative Council chamber by protesters on 1 July 2019. The People's Republic of China flags outside the building and at Golden Bauhinia Square were lowered, and the bloodstained variants of the Black Bauhinia were raised in their place. The Hong Kong flags were also lowered to half-mast as a sign of mourning. Five days later on 6 July, the Black Bauhinia was raised at the Cenotaph.

== Legality ==
Hong Kong customs and police consider the flag to be a violation of the Regional Flag and Regional Emblem Ordinance and a potential trademark violation. Some lawyers, including the barrister Albert Luk, argue that the flag does not meet the specifications of the Ordinance and contravenes the People's Republic of China Flag Law. However, Luk was also of the opinion that the source of the flag cannot be reliably traced without sufficient evidence, and as such, legal action cannot be taken.

== Documentary ==
In 2020, the political documentary Black Bauhinia, directed by Malte Philipp Kaeding, was released. The film chronicles the evolution of the Hong Kong localist movement through the lives of two young activists, Edward Leung and Raymond Wong. It follows their reflections on political resistance against the Chinese government, as they confront decisions between imprisonment and exile under increasing authoritarian pressure. Set against the backdrop of escalating tensions, their personal journeys unfold as mass protests erupt in the city.

The documentary explores themes of identity, political resistance, exile, and the ideological divide between localism and broader democratic movements in post-Umbrella Movement Hong Kong. The documentary has been screened at various international film festivals and has several awards.

== Ukrainian Ministry of Defence video ==
The Chinese and Hong Kong governments criticised the Ukrainian Ministry of Defence for including the Black Bauhinia flag in a video it posted on Twitter on 18 December 2022. In the video, the Ukrainian government thanked the foreign volunteers in the international legion for fighting against invading Russian forces.

The video featured a collage of flags corresponding to the volunteers' nationalities, including the Black Bauhinia flag. (The variant with five stars was used.) The Chinese foreign ministry responded by asking Ukraine to refrain from showing support to "anti-China forces in Hong Kong". The collage also included the flag of Taiwan.

== See also ==
- Liberate Hong Kong, revolution of our times
- Straw Hat Pirates' Jolly Roger
- Milk Tea Alliance
