= Emblem of Hong Kong =

Regional Emblem of Hong Kong 香港特別行政區區徽
- Armiger: Hong Kong
- Adopted: 1 July 1997
- Shield: Gules, a Bauhinia blakeana argent

Emblem of Hong Kong
- Traditional Chinese: 香港特別行政區區徽
Transcriptions
Yue: Cantonese
- Yale Romanization: Hēung góng dahk biht hàhng jing kēui kēui fāi
- Jyutping: Hoeng^{1} gong^{2} dak^{6} bit^{6} hang^{4} zing^{3} keoi^{1} keoi^{1} fai^{1}

The Regional Emblem of the Hong Kong Special Administrative Region of the People's Republic of China came into use on 1 July 1997, after the handover of Hong Kong from the United Kingdom to the People's Republic of China.

It features the same design elements as the regional flag of Hong Kong in a circular setting. The outer white ring is shown with the caption of the official name of the territory in Traditional Chinese and the English short form, "Hong Kong".

== History ==
=== Colonial badge ===
Colonial badge (1843–1959)

The colonial badge was in use since 1843 in one version or another until it was replaced by the coat of arms granted in 1959. Throughout several revisions, the idea of the badge remained. It depicted three merchants and a pile of cargo on a wharf on the left in the foreground. In the background there was a square-rigged ship and a Chinese junk in the harbour with a flag of the Qing dynasty backed by conical hills. Above was the royal arms of the United Kingdom.

=== Colonial arms ===
Coat of arms of Hong Kong 香港盾徽

Versions
- Lesser coat of arms of Hong Kong
- Armiger: Elizabeth II in Right of Hong Kong
- Adopted: 21 January 1959
- Crest: A demi lion Or royally crowned proper holding between the paws a pearl also proper.
- Shield: Argent on water barry wavy in base proper two three-masted Chinese junks in full sail bows inwards also proper on a chief embattled Gules a Naval Crown Or.
- Supporters: On the dexter side a lion Or royally crowned proper and on the sinister side a Chinese Dragon Or.
- Motto: Hong Kong

Emblem of Hong Kong
- Traditional Chinese: 香港盾徽
Transcriptions
Yue: Cantonese
- Yale Romanization: Hēung góng téuhn fāi
- Jyutping: Hoeng^{1} gong^{2} teon^{5} fai^{1}

The arms had been in use in colonial Hong Kong since it was granted on 21 January 1959 and later adopted on the colonial flag in July of that year. The use of the arms by the Hong Kong Government ended in 1997, when it was replaced by the regional emblem. The arms featured two traditional Chinese junks facing each other, and on a red embattled chief a golden naval crown. The crest was a crowned lion holding a pearl, and the supporters were a crowned British lion and a Chinese dragon. The shield and supporters stood on a compartment, consisting of an island, with a scroll bearing the words 'Hong Kong'.

The two junks symbolise the importance of Eastern-type of trade on the sea surrounding the colony. The naval crown symbolises Hong Kong's links with the Navy and the Merchant Navy, and the crenulated line acknowledges the brief but valiant defence of Hong Kong against the Japanese during World War II.

In the crest, the pearl held by the lion indicates the small but precious nature of the Colony. It also recalls the romanticised phrase "Pearl of the Orient" referring to Hong Kong.

The lion and dragon supporters show the British and Chinese connections of Hong Kong. The island symbolises the beginning of the colony as an island and represents the maritime and hilly geography of Hong Kong.

The small lion standing on the crest alone had featured on the reverse of Hong Kong coinage before the introduction of the Bauhinia design in preparation for the handover in 1997.

The colonial arms has been adopted by a group called the Hong Kong Autonomy Movement (HKAM) as their flag for Hong Kong autonomy. The flag features the old coat of arms against a blue background, with the territory's Chinese name "香港" (in reverse form) added to the shield.

=== Display ===
During British rule, the coat of arms were displayed by Government House, the Legislative Council, most courts, and the Central Government Offices. The arms were also in use by aircraft of the Government Flying Service.

== Current emblem ==
The modern emblem came into use on 1 July 1997, after Hong Kong's transfer of sovereignty from the United Kingdom to the People's Republic of China.

=== Description ===
The Regional Emblem of the Hong Kong is round in shape. It bears a red circular edge, an outer ring marked with scripts, a red inner ring with a design of a swaying bauhinia with five star-shaped stamens. The swaying bauhinia design at the centre of the inner ring of the emblem is white in colour. It is formed by five petals, each with a red five-pointed star and a red style. The petals are evenly arranged around the central point of the emblem in a clockwise direction. The centre of the bauhinia lies on the central point of the emblem.

The outer ring marked with scripts lies between the red circular edge and the red inner ring. The words and characters, on a white background, are red in colour. Evenly arranged in the upper part of the outer ring are the traditional Chinese characters 中華人民共和國香港特別行政區 (People's Republic of China Hong Kong Special Administrative Region) in the standard format for the regional emblem. The bottom of each character points towards the centre of the regional emblem. The English words "HONG KONG" in the standard format for the regional emblem are evenly arranged farther down the outer ring.

=== Display and use ===
The regional emblems are displayed at the Central Government Offices. In addition, the regional emblem is displayed at major government offices and buildings, such as Government House, the Executive Council, the legislative council, the law courts of various levels, District Offices, all border control or check points in Hong Kong, the Hong Kong International Airport and the Hong Kong Economic and Trade Offices overseas.

The official car of the Chief Executive of Hong Kong also bears the emblem of Hong Kong. In addition, the emblem of Hong Kong is displayed on the cover page of important government documents, such as Consultation papers and Policy Address of Hong Kong.

== Gallery ==
Crest of the coat of arms of Hong Kong (1959–1997), featured on the reverse of Hong Kong coinage before the introduction of the Bauhinia design in preparation for the handover in 1993.

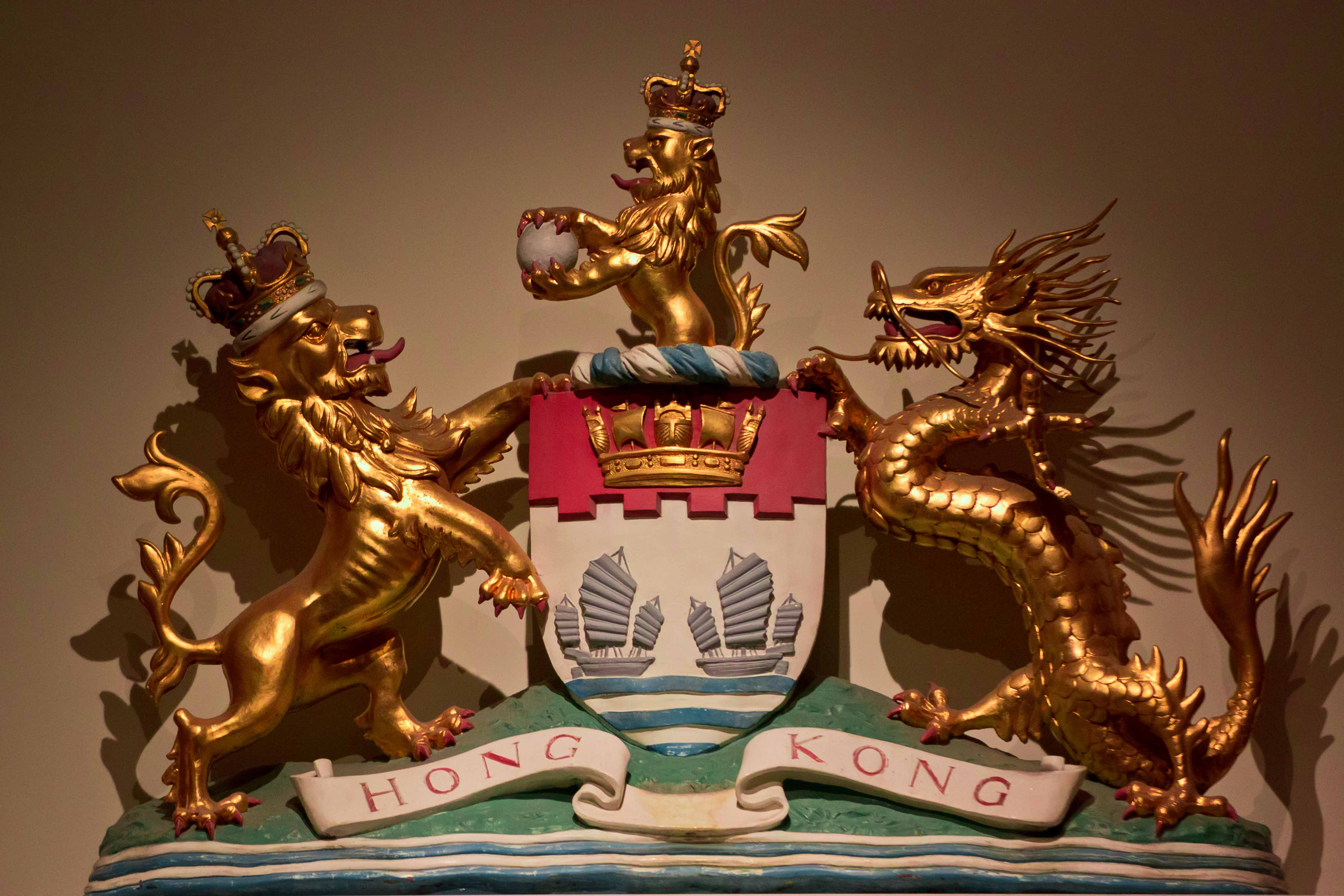
Sculpted version of the colonial arms (1959–1997)

Original design of the regional emblem, approved in 1990 by the National People Congress.

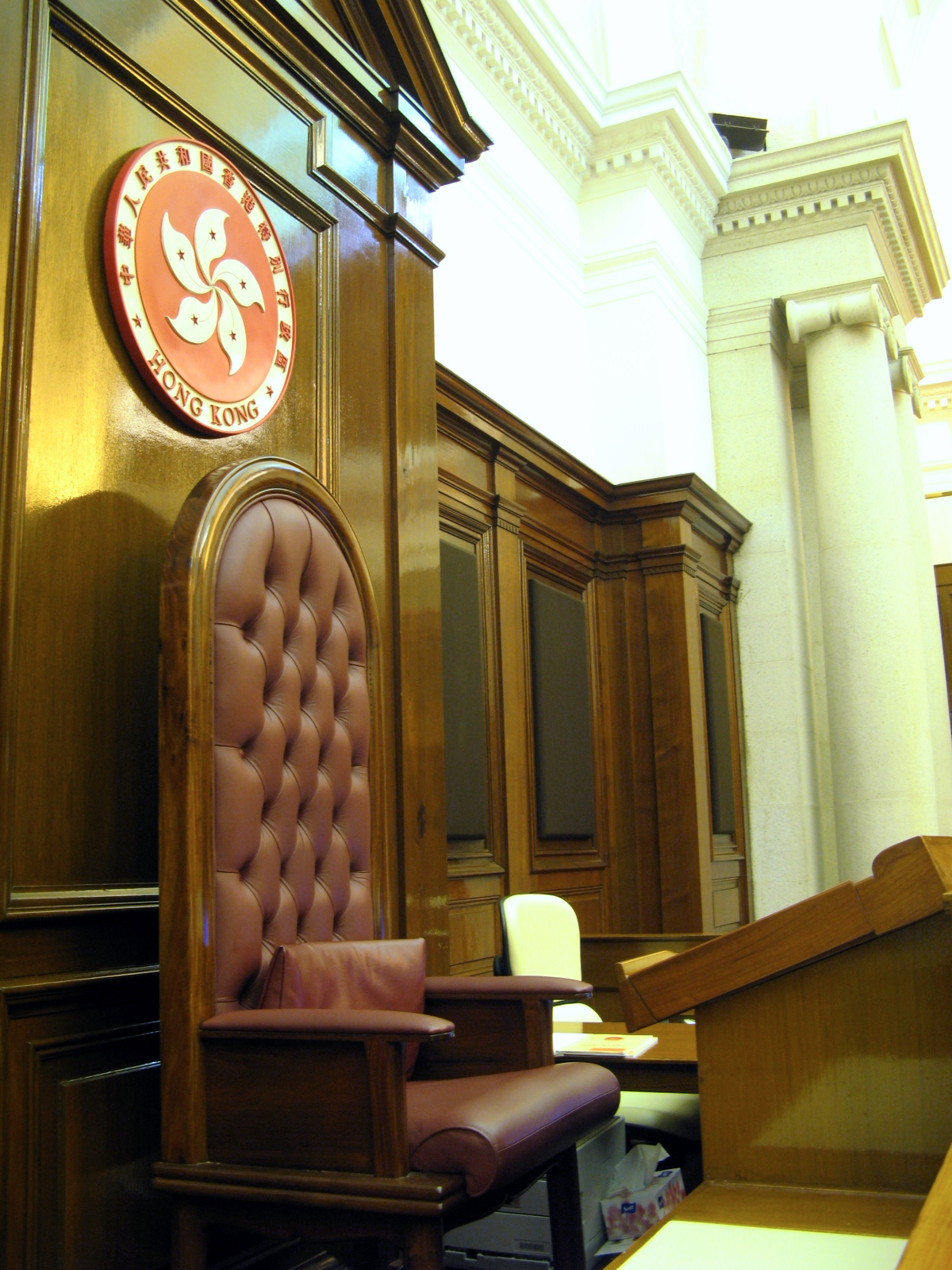
Current emblem (1997–present), shown behind the seat of the President of the Legislative Council.

== See also ==
- Brand Hong Kong
- Flag of Hong Kong
- Public Seal of Hong Kong
- Emblem of Macau
