= Hong Kong handover ceremony =

1997 ceremony

The flags of the United Kingdom and China, countries that were participants in the ceremony.

The handover ceremony of Hong Kong in 1997 officially marked the handover of Hong Kong from the United Kingdom of Great Britain and Northern Ireland to the People's Republic of China. It was an internationally televised event with the ceremony commencing on the night of 30 June 1997 and finishing on the morning of 1 July 1997. The ceremony was held at the new wing of the Hong Kong Convention and Exhibition Centre (HKCEC) in Wan Chai, Hong Kong Island.

== Stage design ==
The big red stage and chairs and podia of the ceremony were designed by Donato Moreno, an American professional stage designer. The left podium was attached with the national emblem of China, while the right podium was attached with the main Coat of arms of the United Kingdom (An alternate version of this arms is used by Scotland). Both podia were located at stage centre in front of the chairs of the main representatives (5 for each country) and beside the flagpoles (2 for each country, taller ones for the sovereign state and the shorter ones for the territorial flag of Hong Kong, correspond to the sovereign state it is under at the time during the ceremony).

== Representatives ==
For the People's Republic of China

- Jiang Zemin, General Secretary of the Chinese Communist Party and President of China
- Li Peng, Premier of the State Council
- Qian Qichen, Minister of Foreign Affairs and 3rd Vice Premier of the State Council
- General Zhang Wannian, Vice Chairman of the Central Military Commission
- Tung Chee-hwa, Chief Executive of Hong Kong

For the United Kingdom of Great Britain and Northern Ireland

- The Prince of Wales (representing Queen Elizabeth II)
- Tony Blair, Prime Minister and First Lord of the Treasury
- Robin Cook, Secretary of State for Foreign and Commonwealth Affairs
- Chris Patten, Governor of Hong Kong
- General Sir Charles Guthrie, Chief of the Defence Staff

Other guests:

- (Australia) Alexander Downer, Australian Foreign Minister
- Yukihiko Ikeda, Foreign Minister of Japan
- Winston Peters, Deputy Prime Minister of New Zealand
- Madeleine Albright, Secretary of State of the United States of America

and representatives from more than 40 other countries and dozens of international organisations.

== Order of events ==
=== Monday, 30 June 1997 ===
Flag of Hong Kong (British Crown colony and British Dependent Territory)

- (15:00 HKT/08:00 GMT) – Beijing Police cleared more than 60,000 people off Tiananmen Square for the final preparations of the all-night official celebration gala to mark the handover of Hong Kong to the People's Republic of China.
- (16:30 HKT/09:30 GMT) – Governor Chris Patten departed from Government House for HMY Britannia after the flag lowering ceremony of the Governor's flag. The bugle call "Last Post" and Patten's favourite pipe tune "Highland Cathedral" was played during the ceremony.
- (17:30 HKT/10:30 GMT) – Chinese leader Jiang Zemin and Chinese Premier Li Peng arrived in Hong Kong by Air China Boeing 747 from Shenzhen.
- (18:15 HKT/11:15 GMT) – Sunset farewell ceremony directed by David Zolkwer. featuring East Tamar Garrison parade on Hong Kong waterfronts. Chris Patten began his final speech as a governor of Hong Kong with "Today is a day of celebration, not sorrow". The bugle call "Sunset" was played for the final time to mark the end of official duties of the British Forces Overseas Hong Kong. "Auld Lang Syne" and Rod Stewart's "Rhythm of My Heart" was also performed during the ceremony.
- (18:30 HKT/11:30 GMT) – Chinese Foreign Minister Qian Qichen met with British Foreign Secretary Robin Cook.
- (20:45 HKT/13:45 GMT) – British Prime Minister Tony Blair meets for summit talks with Chinese leader Jiang Zemin.
- (21:00 HKT/14:00 GMT) – About 500 People's Liberation Army vehicles crossed the border from China to Hong Kong. Pro-democracy advocates protest at the Legislative Council in response to impending Chinese rule.
- (21:30 HKT/14:30 GMT) – Cocktail reception for 4,000 guests at Hong Kong Convention and Exhibition Centre.
- (22:00 HKT/15:00 GMT) – Beijing celebrations including live performances and fireworks were expected to run for 7 hours. The theme of Beijing Blesses you Hong Kong was under preparation.
- (23:45 HKT/16:45 GMT) – Handover Ceremony officially begins. The Prince of Wales reads a farewell speech on behalf of Queen Elizabeth II.
- (23:59:00–23:59:48 HKT/16:59:00–16:59:48 GMT) – Moments before midnight the Flag of the United Kingdom and the flag of British Hong Kong were slowly lowered to the British national anthem "God Save the Queen", symbolising the end of British colonial rule in Hong Kong. A 12-second hiatus occurred between the British and the Chinese anthems due to a timing misunderstanding.

=== Tuesday, 1 July 1997 ===
Flag of Hong Kong (Special Administrative Region)

- (00:00:00 HKT/CST) – Sovereignty of Hong Kong is officially transferred from the United Kingdom to the People's Republic of China. The Flag of the People's Republic of China and the new Hong Kong regional flag were simultaneously raised to the Chinese national anthem "March of the Volunteers", to officially mark the beginning of the Chinese rule in Hong Kong. Chinese leader Jiang Zemin gave a speech expressing his optimism for the implementation of "one country, two systems". Grand celebrations begin in the mainland with fireworks displays over Tiananmen Square.
- (00:15 HKT/CST) – Charles, Prince of Wales and Governor Chris Patten with his family, bid the citizens of Hong Kong farewell at the Tamar site. They boarded HMY Britannia and sailed to Manila in the Philippines for a short state visit before heading back to the United Kingdom. They were escorted by HMS Chatham. Prime Minister Tony Blair and other British officials flew out by a British Airways Boeing 777-200ER from Kai Tak Airport to London's Heathrow Airport.
- (01:30 HKT/CST) – A swearing-in ceremony was held at the HKCEC for various HKSAR officials including Chief Executive Tung Chee-hwa, Chief Secretary for Administration Anson Chan, Financial Secretary Donald Tsang and Secretary for Justice Elsie Leung.
- (02:45 HKT/CST) – The provisional legislature held its first meeting after the handover to adopt handover-related laws.
- (06:00 HKT/CST) – 4,000 People's Liberation Army troops from the Hong Kong Garrison arrive by land, air and sea.
- (10:00 HKT/CST) – The new Hong Kong government hosted a celebration for 4,600 guests. Newly appointed Chief Executive's Tung Chee-hwa makes his inaugural speech.
- (16:00 HKT/CST) – Chinese Premier Li Peng makes a speech at a reception in the Great Hall of the People in Beijing.
- (18:00 HKT/CST) – Festival Performance by Hong Kong mainland and international celebrities at the Hong Kong Coliseum.
- (19:00 HKT/CST) – Grand convention and art spectacle begins at the Workers' Stadium in Beijing.
- (20:00 HKT/CST) – The 1997 Hong Kong Spectacular across Victoria Harbour from Causeway Bay to Central, Hong Kong fireworks display begins.

== Reactions ==
In 2005, the British Mail on Sunday revealed Prince Charles's memorandum, of which "Clarence House said only 11 copies were made, circulated to close friends", where he referred to the transfer as the "Great Chinese Takeaway" and the Chinese officials as "appalling old waxworks". In another reported extract, Prince Charles described the ceremony as an "awful Soviet-style" performance and dismissed the speech by Chinese leader Jiang Zemin as "propaganda", complete with loud cheering "by the bussed-in party faithful at the suitable moment in the text." He also ridiculed the People's Liberation Army's goose-steps in the ceremony and claimed his trip on HMY Britannia out of Hong Kong was closely watched by Chinese warships.

The 12-second silence between the British and Chinese anthems has been adapted into the 2019 film My People, My Country.

The sunset farewell ceremony is portrayed in the fifth season of Netflix's historical-drama series The Crown (2022), in the season's final episode "Decommissioned".
