= Tao Ho =

Hong Kong architect (1936–2019)

- Undated photo of Ho
- Born: 13 July 1936; Shanghai, China
- Died: 29 March 2019 (aged 82); Wan Chai, Hong Kong
- Education: Harvard University (MArch, 1964)
- Occupation: Architect
- Known for: Designing the Bauhinia emblem on the flag of Hong Kong

Chinese name
- Chinese: 何弢
Transcriptions
Standard Mandarin
- Hanyu Pinyin: Hé Tāo
Yue: Cantonese
- Yale Romanization: Hòh Tōu
- Jyutping: Ho^{4} Tou^{1}

Tao Ho (17 July 1936 – 29 March 2019) was a Hong Kong architect best known for designing the Bauhinia emblem on the flag of Hong Kong.

== Background ==
Born in Shanghai in 1936 to Ping Yin Ho and Chin Hwa, Ho grew up with elder brother Chien and younger sister Diana. He graduated from Pui Ching Middle School and went on to receive a BA in art history with a minor in music and theology at Williams College in Massachusetts. Then, he studied for his MArch at Harvard's Graduate School of Design under the tutelage of Josep Lluís Sert, Sigfried Giedion, and Walter Gropius, the latter of whom hired Ho upon graduation as his personal assistant at The Architects Collaborative.

In 1968, four years after Ho returned to Hong Kong, he founded TaoHo Design Architects. Early projects include the Hong Kong International School and the Hong Kong Arts Centre, whose designs heralded the arrival of the Bauhaus to Hong Kong. Within his broad portfolio of works are the Hong Kong Pavilion at the 1986 World Expo in Vancouver, the renovation of Hong Kong's Governor House for Lord Chris Patten, the award-winning Wing Kwong Pentecostal Church, the first panda pavilion at Ocean Park and the revitalization of the Western Market in Sheung Wan. Tao also designed Hong Kong SAR's Bauhinia emblem, its flag and the ceremonial pen used at the handover signing ceremony in 1997.

An advocate of heritage conservation and cultural development, Ho conceived of an arts district for the city that is now the West Kowloon Cultural District. He enjoyed sharing his views on “TaoHo on Music” (樂論滔滔在何弢) for RTHK in the 1980s. In the 1990s, he was one of the four regular hosts of “Free As The Wind” (講東講西), discussing his views on cultural and social issues.

He served as president of the Hong Kong Institute of Architects from 1994 to 1998. As president, he criticised the proposed controversial design for the new Hong Kong Central Library. This was controversial because the HKIA code of conduct stated that members should not criticise other members' work unless they inform that party in advance. Ho responded that absent criticism, architects may suffer from "narcissism".

== Designs ==
Ho designed the Hong Kong Arts Centre in 1977. A hanging piece created by Ho, entitled "Synergy of Dynamic Energy," is installed in the West Hall of the Hong Kong International Airport passenger terminal.

Ho designed the Bauhinia emblem on the flag of Hong Kong.

== Awards ==
In February 1997, Ho was awarded the Crystal Award by the World Economic Forum in Davos, Switzerland, honoring him as a leading international artist and architect and for his contribution to bridging the cultures of the East and the West.

== Personal life ==
Ho was debilitated by a stroke in April 2002 while on a business trip in Wuhan, China.

Ho died from pneumonia on 29 March 2019 at age 82, three days after being admitted to Ruttonjee Hospital.

== Projects ==
- Hong Kong Arts Centre, Hong Kong, 1977
- Office and ticket branch interior, Japan Air Lines Office, Central, Hong Kong, 1980
- Pacific Centre, Central, 1990
- China Construction Bank Headquarters, Beijing, 1997
- Everbright Centre. Shanghai, 1999
- Wing Kwong Pentecostal Holiness Church. Lok Fu, Hong Kong, 2000

== Gallery ==
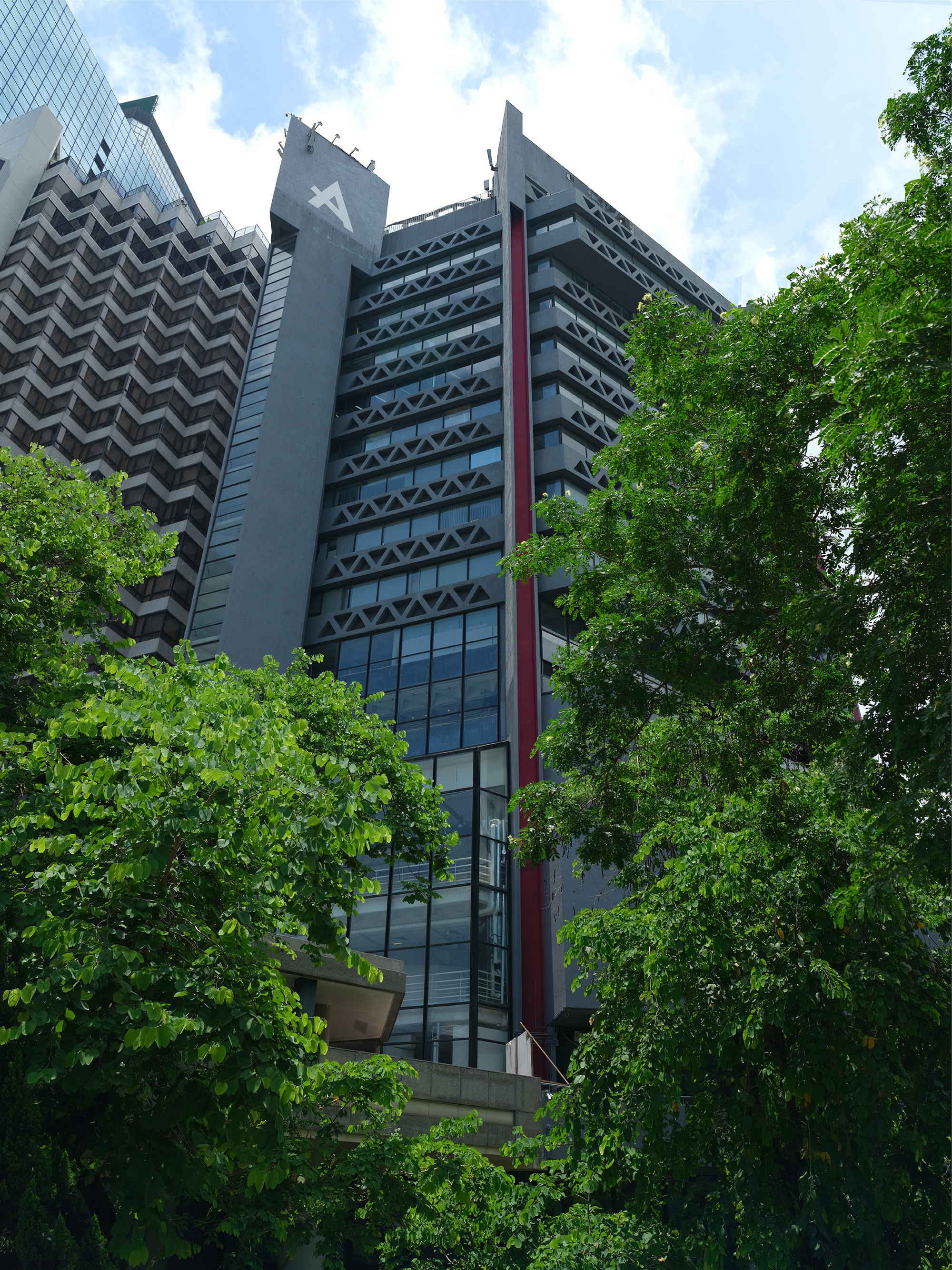
Hong Kong Arts Centre

Flag of Hong Kong SAR

Emblem of Hong Kong SAR
