= Flag of Hong Kong =

Hong Kong Special Administrative Region of the People's Republic of China
- Use: Civil and state flag, civil and state ensign
- Proportion: 2:3
- Adopted: Approved on 4 April 1990 by the National People's Congress; first flown on 1 July 1997; 29 years ago
- Design: A stylised, white, five-petal Bauhinia flower in the centre of a red field
- Designed by: Tao Ho

Regional flag of the Hong Kong Special Administrative Region
- Traditional Chinese: 香港特別行政區區旗
- Simplified Chinese: 香港特别行政区区旗
Transcriptions
Standard Mandarin
- Hanyu Pinyin: Xiānggǎng Tèbié Xíngzhèngqū Qūqí
Yue: Cantonese
- Yale Romanization: Jūngwàh Yàhnmàhn Guhngwòhgwok Hēunggóng Dahkbiht Hàhngjing Kēui Kēuikèih
- Jyutping: Zung^{1}waa^{4} Jan^{4}man^{4} Gung^{6}wo^{4}gwok^{3} Hoeng^{1}gong^{2} Dak^{6}bit^{6} Hang^{4}zing^{3} Keoi^{1} Keoi^{1}kei^{4}

The Regional Flag of the Hong Kong Special Administrative Region of the People's Republic of China depicts a white stylised five-petal Hong Kong orchid tree (Bauhinia × blakeana) flower in the centre of a Chinese red field. The design of the flag is enshrined in Hong Kong Basic Law, the territory's constitutional document, and regulations regarding its use, prohibition of use, desecration, and manufacture are stated in the Regional Flag and Regional Emblem Ordinance.

The original design of the flag of Hong Kong was unveiled on 4 April 1990 at the Third Session of the Seventh National People's Congress. The current design was approved on 10 August 1996 at the Fourth Plenum of the Preparatory Committee of the Hong Kong Special Administrative Region. The use of the flag is regulated by laws passed by the 58th executive meeting of the State Council held in Beijing. The flag was officially adopted and hoisted on 1 July 1997, during the handover ceremony marking the handover from the United Kingdom back to China.

A variant of the flag known as the Black Bauhinia has been used by anti-Chinese government protesters in Hong Kong, particularly during the 2019–2020 Hong Kong protests. In contrast of the protests, pro-government supporters often display the Chinese and Hong Kong flags.

== Current design ==
=== Symbolism ===
Original design of the regional flag of Hong Kong revealed in 1990 by the National People Congress

The design of the flag comes with cultural, political, and regional meanings. The colour itself is significant; red is a festive colour for the Chinese people, used to convey a sense of celebration and nationalism. Moreover, the red colour is identical to that used in the national flag of the People's Republic of China, chosen to signify the link re-established between post-colonial Hong Kong and mainland China. The position of red and white on the flag symbolises the "one country, two systems" political principle applied to the region. The stylised rendering of the Bauhinia × blakeana flower, a flower discovered in Hong Kong, is meant to serve as a harmonising symbol for this dichotomy. The five stars of the Chinese national flag are replicated on the petals of the flower. The Chinese name of Bauhinia × blakeana is most commonly rendered as yángzǐjīng (洋紫荊), but is often shortened to zǐjīng (紫荊/紫荆) in official uses since yáng (洋) means "foreign" in Chinese, notwithstanding that the shortened name refers to another genus, Cercis. A sculpture of the plant has been erected in Golden Bauhinia Square in Hong Kong.

Before the adoption of the flag, Ji Pengfei, the Chairman of the Hong Kong Basic Law Drafting Committee explained the significance of the flag's design to the National People's Congress:

The regional flag carries a design of five bauhinia petals, each with a star in the middle, on a red background. The red flag represents the motherland and the bauhinia represents Hong Kong. The design implies that Hong Kong is an inalienable part of China and prospers in the embrace of the motherland. The five stars on the flower symbolise the fact that all Hong Kong compatriots love their motherland, while the red and white colours embody the principle of "one country, two systems".

=== Construction ===
National Standard of the regional flag

The Hong Kong government has specified sizes, colours, and manufacturing parameters in which the flag is to be made. The ratio of its length to breadth is 3:2. In its centre is a five-petal stylised rendering of a white Bauhinia × blakeana flower. If a circle was to circumscribe the flower, it would have a diameter 0.6 times the entire height of the flag. The petals are uniformly spread around the centre point of the flag, radiating outward and turning in a clockwise direction. Each of the flower's petals bears a five-pointed red star with a red trace, suggestive of a flower stamen. The heading that is used to allow a flag to be slid or raised onto a pole is white.

A slightly different geometrical description of the flag is specified in the mandatory National Standard "GB 16689-2004: Regional flag of Hong Kong special administrative region". (Note: The offset angle of the top petal is 14° as opposed to 13°48'.)

Construction sheet for the Hong Kong flag according to the Regional Flag and Regional Emblem Ordinance (The angle is 14° in GB 16689-2004)

=== Size specifications ===
This table lists all the official sizes for the flag. Sizes deviating from this list are considered non-standard. If a flag is not of official size, it must be a scaled-down or scaled-up version of one of the official sizes.

Size	Length and width (cm)
1	288 × 192
2	240 × 160
3	192 × 128
4	144 × 96
5	96 × 64
Car flag	30 × 20
Flag for signing ceremonies	21 × 14
Desktop flag	15 × 10

=== Colour specifications ===
The Regional Flag and Regional Emblem Ordinance stipulates that "The regional flag is in red, the chrominance value of which is identical with that of the national flag of the People's Republic of China," and that the emblem is white.

=== Manufacture regulations ===
The Regional Flag and Regional Emblem Ordinance stipulates that the Hong Kong flag must be manufactured according to specifications laid out in the ordinance. If flags are not produced in design according to the ordinance, the Secretary for Justice may petition the District Court for an injunction to prohibit the person or company from manufacturing the flags. If the District Court agrees that the flags are not in compliance, it may issue an injunction and order that the flags and the materials that were used to make the flags to be seized by the government.

== Protocol ==
The Hong Kong flag is flown daily from the chief executive's official residence (Government House), at the Hong Kong International Airport, and at all border crossings and points of entry into Hong Kong. At major government offices and buildings, such as the Office of the Chief Executive, the Executive Council, the Court of Final Appeal, the High Court, the Legislative Council, and the Hong Kong Economic and Trade Offices overseas, the flag is displayed during days when these offices are working. Other government offices and buildings, such as hospitals, schools, departmental headquarters, sports grounds, and cultural venues, should fly the flag on occasions such as the National Day of the People's Republic of China (1 October), the Hong Kong Special Administrative Region Establishment Day (1 July), and New Year's Day. The flag should be raised at 8:00 a.m. and lowered at 6:00 p.m. The raising and lowering of the flag should be done slowly; it must reach the peak of the flagstaff when raised, and it may not touch the ground when lowered. The flag may not be raised in severe weather conditions. A Hong Kong flag that is either damaged, defaced, faded or substandard must not be displayed or used.

=== Display ===
Whenever the Chinese national flag is flown together with the Hong Kong regional flag, the national flag must be flown at the centre, above the regional flag, or otherwise in a more prominent position than that of the regional flag. The regional flag must be smaller in size than the national flag, and it must be displayed to the left of the national flag. When the flags are displayed inside a building, the left and right sides of a person looking at the flags, and with his or her back toward the wall, are used as reference points for the left and right sides of a flag. When the flags are displayed outside a building, the left and right sides of a person standing in front of the building and looking towards the front entrance are used as reference points for the left and right sides of a flag. The national flag should be raised before the regional flag is raised, and it should be lowered after the regional flag is lowered.

Protocol examples. Note how the national flag is bigger than the regional flag in both examples.

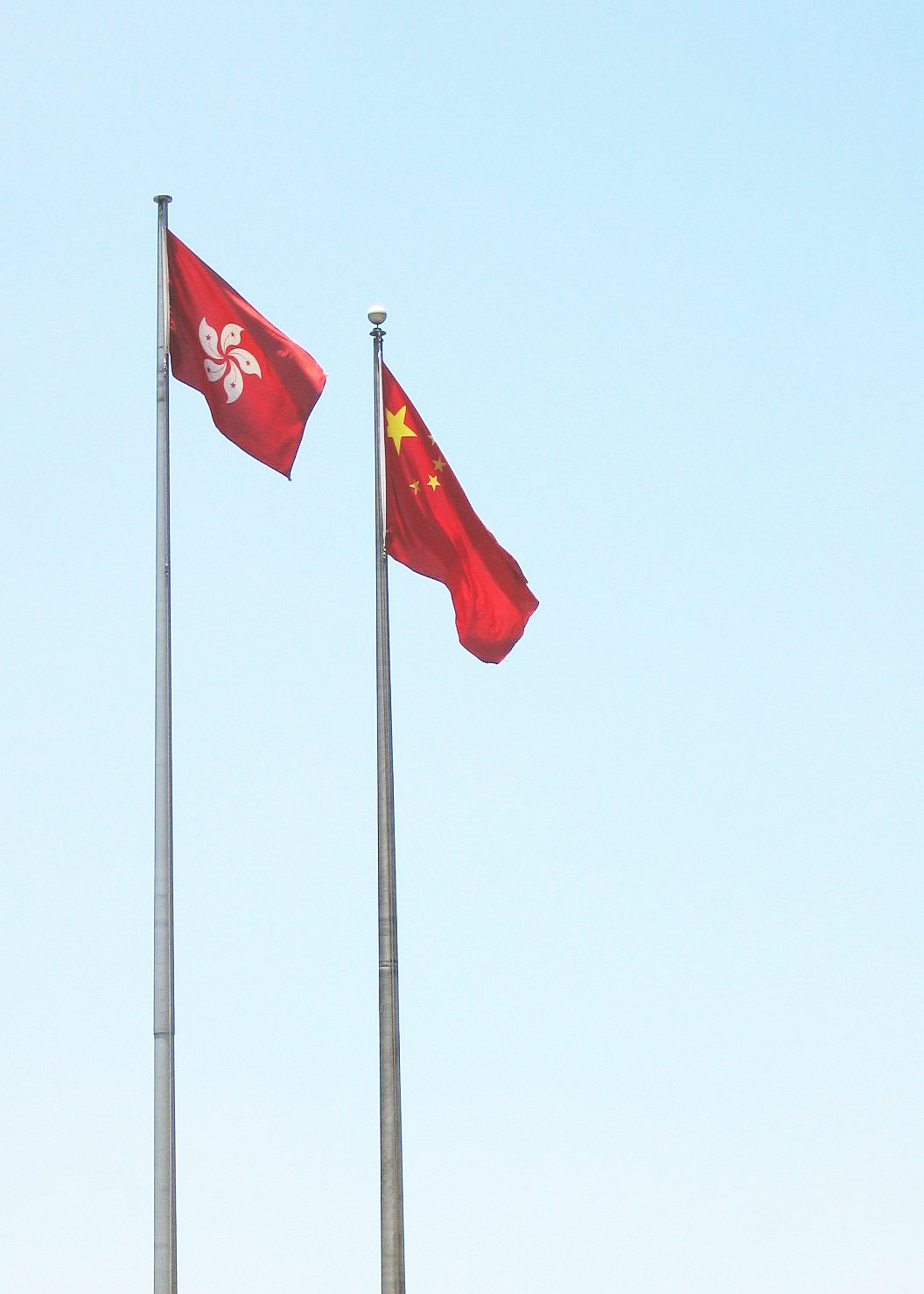
The flag of Hong Kong flying beside the flag of China

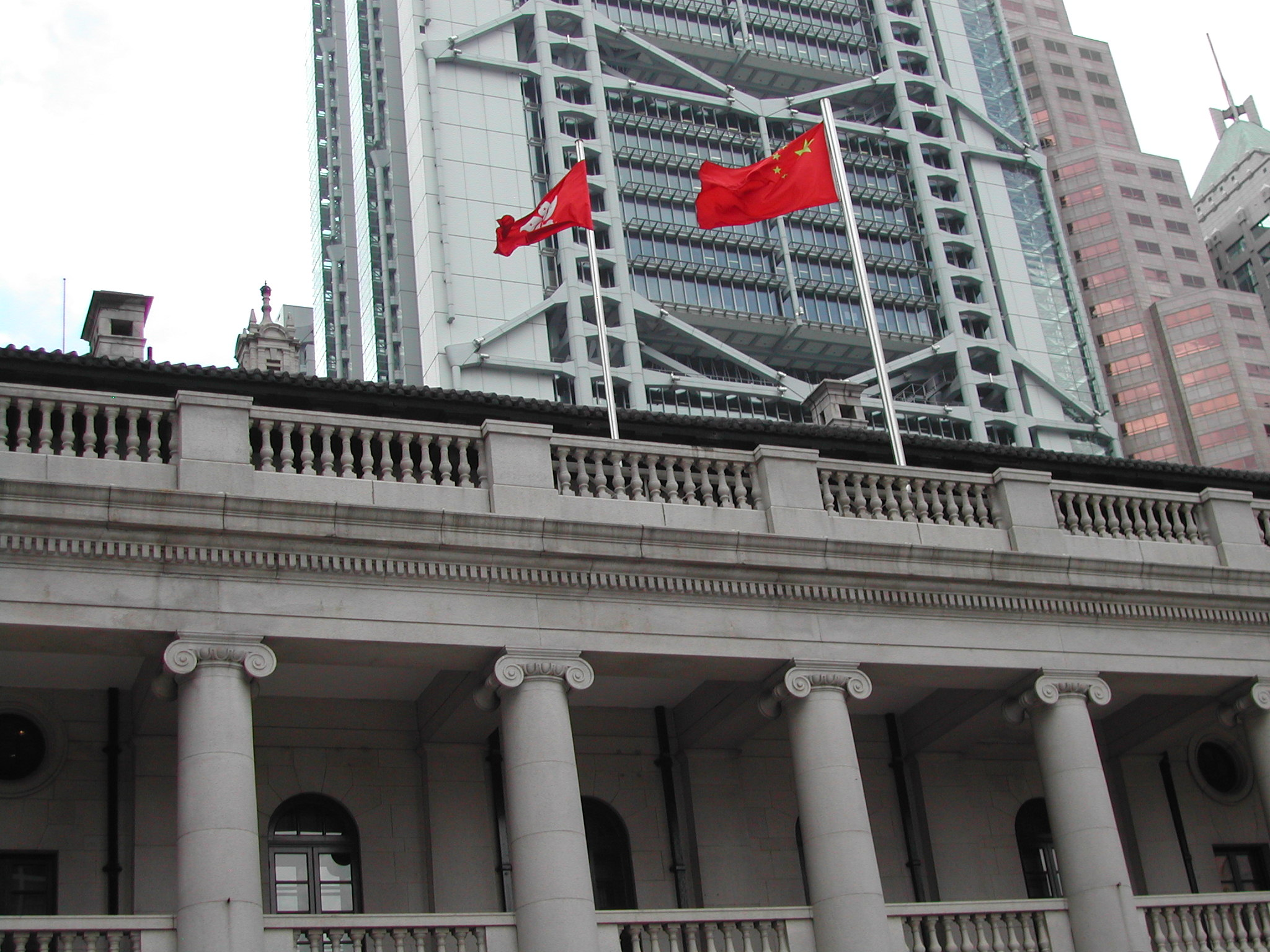
The Hong Kong flag and the Chinese flag flown side by side at the patio of the Court of Final Appeal

==== Half-mast ====
An illustration of the Hong Kong flag at half-mast

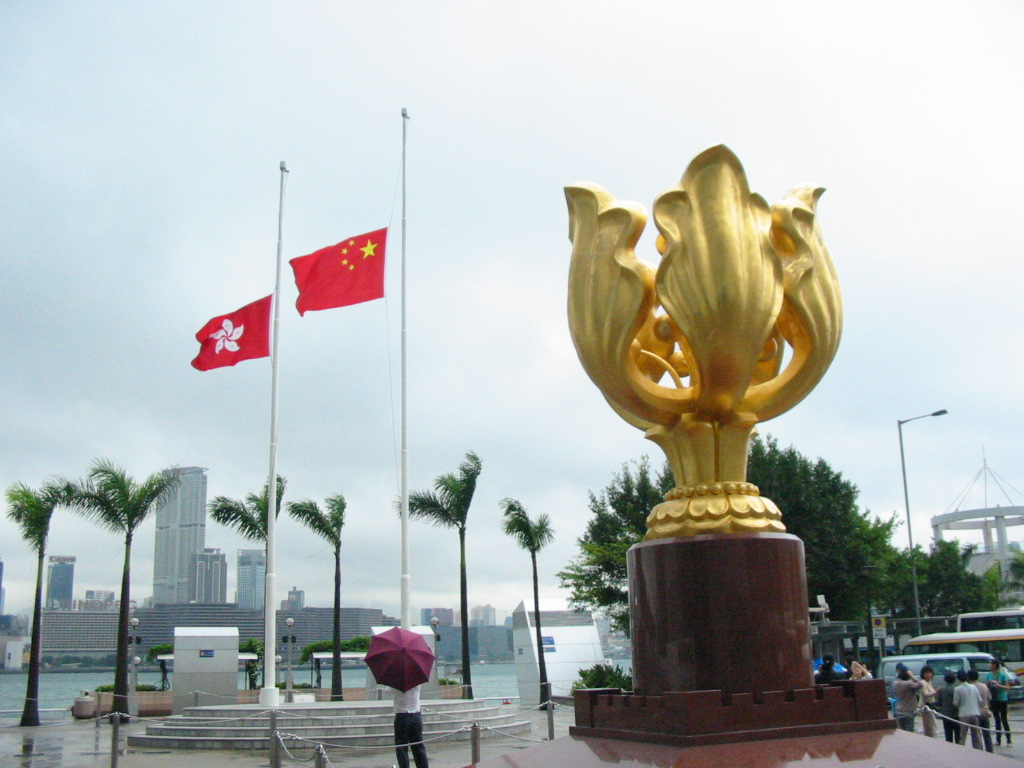
The Hong Kong and Chinese flags at half-mast to mourn victims killed in the 2008 Sichuan earthquake

The Hong Kong flag must be lowered to half-mast as a token of mourning when any of the following people die:

- President of the People's Republic of China
- Chairman of the Standing Committee of the National People's Congress
- Premier of the State Council
- Chairman of the Central Military Commission
- Chairman of the National Committee of the Chinese People's Political Consultative Conference
- Persons who have made outstanding contributions to the People's Republic of China as the Central People's Government advises the Chief Executive.
- Persons who have made outstanding contributions to world peace or the cause of human progress as the Central People's Government advises the Chief Executive.
- Persons whom the Chief Executive considers to have made outstanding contributions to the Hong Kong Special Administrative Region or for whom they consider it appropriate to fly the flag at half-mast.

The flag may also be flown at half-mast when the Central People's Government advises the Chief Executive to do so, or when the Chief Executive considers it appropriate to do so, on occurrences of unfortunate events causing especially serious casualties, or when serious natural calamities have caused heavy casualties. When raising a flag to be flown at half-mast, it should first be raised to the top of the pole and then lowered to a point where the distance between the top of the flag and the top of the pole is one third of the length of the pole. When lowering the flag from half-mast, it should first be raised to the peak of the pole before it is lowered.

=== Prohibition of use and desecration ===
The Regional Flag and Regional Emblem Ordinance states what manner of use of the Hong Kong flag is prohibited and that desecration of the flag is prohibited. It also states that it is a punishable offence for a person to use the flag in a prohibited manner or to desecrate the flag. According to the ordinance, a flag may not be used in advertisements or trademarks, and that "publicly and wilfully burning, mutilating, scrawling on, defiling or trampling" the flag is considered flag desecration. Similarly, the National Flag and National Emblem Ordinance extends the same prohibition toward the Chinese flag. The ordinances also allow for the Chief Executive to make stipulations regarding the use of the flag. In stipulations made in 1997, the Chief Executive further specified that the use of the flag in "any trade, calling or profession, or the logo, seal or badge of any non-governmental organisation" is also prohibited unless prior permission was obtained.

==== Incidents ====
The first conviction of flag desecration occurred in 1999. Protesters Ng Kung-siu and Lee Kin-yun wrote the word "shame" on both the Chinese flag and the Hong Kong flag. They were convicted of violating the National Flag and National Emblem Ordinance and the Regional Flag and Regional Emblem Ordinance. The Court of Appeal overturned the verdict, ruling that the ordinances constituted unnecessary restrictions on freedom of expression and violated both the Basic Law and the International Covenant on Civil and Political Rights. Upon further appeal, however, the Court of Final Appeal maintained the original guilty verdict, holding that this restriction on the freedom of expression was justifiable in that the protection of the flags played a role in national unity and territorial integrity and constituted a restriction on the mode of expressing one's message but did not interfere with one's freedom to express the same message in other ways.

Leung Kwok-hung, a former member of the Legislative Council and a political activist in Hong Kong, was penalised in February 2001, before he became a member of the Legislative Council, for defiling the flag. He was convicted of three counts of desecrating the flag—for two incidents on 1 July 2000 during the third anniversary of Hong Kong's handover to China and for one incident on 9 July of the same year during a protest against elections to choose the Election Committee, the electoral college which chooses the Chief Executive of Hong Kong. Leung was placed on a good-behaviour bond for 12 months in the sum of HK$3,000.

== Previous flags of Hong Kong ==
=== Pre-colonial period ===
==== Qing dynasty (1862–1895) ====
Before the secession of Hong Kong to the United Kingdom following the First Opium War and the Treaty of Nanking, Hong Kong fell under the jurisdiction of the Chinese government and flew the flag and ensign of the Chinese government of the time. Before the establishment of the crown colony of Hong Kong, the ruling dynasty in China was the Qing dynasty. Despite being established in 1644, the Qing Empire had no official flags until 1862. Up until 1898, when the Second Convention of Peking was signed between the Qing Court and the government of the United Kingdom, the New Territories was still Qing land. The flag itself features the "Azure Dragon" on a plain yellow field with the red flaming pearl of the three-legged crow in the upper left corner.

Qing dynasty flag, 1862–1889

Qing dynasty flag, 1889–1912

=== Colonial flags ===
The flag of British Hong Kong from 1870 to 1997 was a Blue Ensign with the coat of arms of Hong Kong on a white disk. In Hong Kong, it is known as the Hong Kong flag (Chinese: 香港旗), British Hong Kong flag (英屬香港旗; 英属香港旗) or the Dragon and Lion flag (龍獅旗; 龙狮旗). Following a grant from the College of Arms in 1959, it was adopted as the flag of British Hong Kong.

==== First colonial flag (1870–1876) ====
In 1870, a "white crown over HK" badge for the Blue Ensign flag was proposed by the Colonial Secretary. The design was updated in 1873 and the letters "HK" were removed.

==== Second colonial flag (1876–1959) ====
In 1876, a "local scene" badge (Chinese: 阿群帶路圖, lit. 'Ar Kwan leads the way badge') was adopted to the Blue Ensign flag with the Admiralty's approval. The "local scene" depicted traders in the foreground and both European-style and Chinese-style trading ships in the background.

During the Pacific War, part of World War II, the Empire of Japan captured Hong Kong in 1941 and occupied it until 1945. The Japanese military government used the flag of Japan in its official works in Hong Kong.

The design of the "local scene" badge was revised in 1955.

==== Third colonial flag (1959–1997) ====
A coat of arms for Hong Kong was granted on 21 January 1959 by the College of Arms in London. The Hong Kong flag was subsequently revised to feature the coat of arms in the Blue Ensign flag, and Prince Philip, Duke of Edinburgh, officially presented it to Robin Black, the then governor of Hong Kong. This design was used officially from 1959 until Hong Kong's handover in 1997. Since then, the 1959–1997 colonial flag has been used by anti–Chinese government protestors and supporters of the Hong Kong independence movement.

Flag used in 1870–1873

Flag used in 1876–1955

Flag used in 1955–1959

Flag used in 1959–1997

== Proposals before the handover ==
Before Hong Kong's handover, between 20 May 1987 and 31 March 1988, a contest was held amongst Hong Kong residents to help choose a flag for post-colonial Hong Kong, with 7,147 design submissions, in which 4,489 submissions were about flag designs. Architect Tao Ho was chosen as one of the panel judges to pick Hong Kong's new flag. He recalled that some of the designs had been rather funny and with political twists: "One had a hammer and sickle on one side and a dollar sign on the other." Some designs were rejected because they contained copyrighted materials, for example, the emblem of Urban Council, Hong Kong Arts Festival and Hong Kong Tourism Board. Six designs were chosen as finalists by the judges, but they were all later rejected by the Chinese government, which asked Ho and two others to submit new proposals.

Looking for inspiration, Ho wandered into a garden and picked up a Bauhinia × blakeana flower. He observed the symmetry of the five petals, and how their winding pattern conveyed to him a dynamic feeling. This led him to incorporate the flower into the flag to represent Hong Kong. The design was adopted on 4 April 1990 at the Third Session of the Seventh National People's Congress. The current design was approved on 10 August 1996 at the Fourth Plenum of the Preparatory Committee of the Hong Kong Special Administrative Region, and the flag was first officially hoisted seconds after midnight on 1 July 1997 in the handover ceremony marking the handover. It was hoisted together with the national Chinese flag, while the Chinese national anthem, "March of the Volunteers", was played. The Union Flag and the colonial Hong Kong flag were lowered seconds before midnight.

Selection of proposals during the 1987–1988 contest

=== Black Bauhinia variant ===
Black Bauhinia flag

The Black Bauhinia flag is a variant of the flag of Hong Kong with a black background and (in most versions) a modified bauhinia flower. The flag first appeared amid the 2019–2020 Hong Kong protests as a symbol of protest against the Chinese government, in contrast to pro-government supporters displaying the Chinese and Hong Kong flags.

== See also ==
- Emblem of Hong Kong
- Flag of Macau
- List of British flags
- List of Chinese flags
- List of Hong Kong flags
