= Flag of Hong Kong (1959–1997) =

British Hong Kong
- Hong Kong flag; Dragon and Lion flag
- Use: Civil and state flag, state ensign
- Proportion: 1:2
- Adopted: 29 July 1959 (earlier versions in 1871, 1876 and 1955)
- Relinquished: 30 June 1997
- Design: A Blue Ensign with the coat of arms of Hong Kong on a white disk
- Designed by: Geoffrey Cadzow Hamilton
- Hong Kong Red Ensign (unofficial)
- Use: Civil ensign
- Proportion: 1:2
- Adopted: 29 July 1959 (it has been widely used since the late 1980s)
- Relinquished: 30 June 1997
- Design: A Red Ensign with the coat of arms of Hong Kong on a white disk
- Flag of the governor of Hong Kong
- Use: Other
- Proportion: 1:2
- Adopted: 29 July 1959 (earlier versions in 1910 and 1955)
- Relinquished: 30 June 1997
- Design: A Union Flag defaced with the coat of arms.

The flag of Hong Kong from 1959 to 1997 was a Blue Ensign with the coat of arms of Hong Kong on a white disk. In Hong Kong, it is known as the Hong Kong flag (香港旗), British Hong Kong flag (英屬香港旗) or the Dragon and Lion flag (龍獅旗). In 1959, following a grant from the College of Arms and with the consent of Queen Elizabeth II, it was adopted as the flag of British Hong Kong. While the flag lost its official status following the transfer of sovereignty over Hong Kong on 1 July 1997, it resurfaced in the 2010s as a symbol of protest against Chinese government interference and support for Hong Kong autonomy. Rather than advocating for a return to British colonial rule, the flag serves as a visual demand for the autonomy guaranteed under the Sino-British Joint Declaration.

== History ==
Prior to Hong Kong's transfer of sovereignty, the flag of Hong Kong was a colonial Blue Ensign flag. The flag of colonial Hong Kong underwent several changes from then until 1997.

=== Use of Union Flag (1843–1871) ===
In 1843, a seal representing Hong Kong was instituted. The design was based on a local waterfront scene; three local merchants with their commercial goods are shown on the foreground, a square-rigged ship and a junk occupy the middle ground, while the background consists of conical hills and clouds. In 1868, a Hong Kong flag was produced, a Blue Ensign flag with a badge based on this "local scene", but the design was rejected by Hong Kong Governor Richard Graves MacDonnell.

=== First colonial flag (1871–1876) ===
On 3 July 1869, a new design for the Hong Kong flag was commissioned at a cost of £3 (equivalent to £309 in 2025), which featured a "gentleman in an evening coat who is purchasing tea on the beach at Kowloon". After a brief discussion in the executive council, it was determined that the new design was very problematic and it was not adopted.

In 1870, a "white crown over HK" badge for the Blue Ensign flag was proposed by the Colonial Secretary. The letters "HK" were omitted and the crown became full-colour three years later. It is unclear exactly what the badge looked like during that period of time, but it was unlikely to be the "local scene". It should have been a crown of some sort, which may, or may not, have had the letters "HK" below it. In 1876, the "local scene" badge (Chinese: 阿群帶路圖 Picture of "Ar Kwan" Guiding the British soldier) was re-adopted to the Blue Ensign flag with the Admiralty's approval.

=== Second colonial flag (1876–1955) ===
During a government meeting, held in 1911, it was suggested that the name of the colony appear on the flag in both Latin and Chinese scripts. However, this was dismissed as it would "look absurd" to both Chinese and Europeans. The flag which was eventually adopted featured the Blue Ensign together with a "local scene" of traders in the foreground and both European-style and Chinese-style trading ships in the background.

=== Japanese occupation period (1941–1945) ===
During the Second World War, Hong Kong was seized and occupied by the Empire of Japan from 1941 to 1945. During the occupation, the Japanese military government used the flag of Japan in its official works in Hong Kong.

=== Third colonial flag (1955–1959) ===
The flag was similar in design to that previously used. It featured a British Blue Ensign with a local waterfront scene.

=== Fourth colonial flag (1959–1997) ===
A coat of arms for Hong Kong was granted on 21 January 1959 by the College of Arms in London. The Hong Kong flag was revised in the same year to feature the coat of arms in the Blue Ensign flag. This design was used officially from 1959 until Hong Kong's transfer of sovereignty in 1997. Since then, the colonial flag has been appropriated by protestors, such as on the annual 1 July marches for universal suffrage, as a "symbol of antagonism towards the mainland", along with a blue flag featuring the coat of arms, used by those advocating independence. The flag features a British Blue Ensign with the coat of arms of Hong Kong (1959–1997).

Flag used from 1843 to 1871

Flag used from 1871 to 1876

Flag used from 1876 to 1941 and 1945 to 1955

Flag used from 1941 to 1945

Flag used from 1955 to 1959

Flag used from 1959 to 1997

Unofficial Red Ensign used from 1959 to 1997, it has been widely used since the late 1980s.

== Flags used by government departments ==
=== Flags of the governor of Hong Kong ===
Flag of the governor of Hong Kong, 1910–1955

Flag of the governor of Hong Kong, 1955–1959

Flag of the governor of Hong Kong, 1959–1997

=== Council flags ===
==== Hong Kong Regional Council ====
The flag of the Regional Council represented the governmental body which oversaw matters related to the outlying areas of the territory during the colonial period. The flag itself featured a stylised dark green R at a 45-degree angle on white background.

Flag of the Regional Council

==== Hong Kong Urban Council ====
The flag of the Urban Council represented the governmental body which was responsible for matters pertaining to the urban areas of the territory during the colonial period. The flag itself features a simplified white Bauhinia blakeana on a magenta background.

Flag of the Urban Council

== Creation and usage ==
Before the Second World War, Hong Kong had no official flag and used a series of blue ensigns with different flag badges. Following the war, the Governor of Hong Kong Robert Black decided to gain an official grant of arms to use on Hong Kong's flag. Designed in 1958 by Geoffrey Cadzow Hamilton, managing officer of the civil service, the flag was approved by the Executive Council of Hong Kong, and then by the College of Arms with minor amendments. The arms on the flag were designed with Chinese junks, a naval crown, and a lion and dragon as supporters, with a crowned lion crest on the helm holding a pearl; this was a reference to Hong Kong's nickname as the "Pearl of the Orient". Queen Elizabeth II granted a Royal Warrant for the coat of arms, which was presented to Governor Black by Prince Philip, Duke of Edinburgh. The Queen's Counsellors of State later gave permission on her behalf for the arms to be used on a blue ensign as the colony's flag.

Ships registered in Hong Kong flew the Hong Kong blue ensign and were able to use the British Red Ensign as an identifier. The flag was used to represent Hong Kong in sports, including at the Olympic Games, although the British national anthem, "God Save the Queen", was used for gold medalists. The flag had no specific legal protections; there were no laws prohibiting desecration of the flag during British rule.

Following the planned transfer of sovereignty over Hong Kong, plans were drawn up in the 1990s for a new flag to replace the Blue Ensign. Following a public competition, a red flag with a bauhinia was chosen as the new flag of Hong Kong. This new flag gained formal legal status replacing the Blue Ensign at the handover on 1 July 1997.

== Post-handover ==
Current flag of Hong Kong

Derivative flag used by the Hong Kong Autonomy Movement

Following the Hong Kong handover ceremony, when the Union Jack and the Hong Kong blue ensign were lowered to symbolise the end of British rule in Hong Kong, the blue ensign lost its official status and was replaced by the current flag of Hong Kong. In the 2010s, the former flag of Hong Kong was used by protesters to represent the cultural differences between Hong Kong and mainland China; the flag was also used to protest against Chinese interference in Hong Kong, as well as perceived delays in implementing universal suffrage (promised by the Sino-British Joint Declaration). The first high-profile use of the old flag in protests came in 2011 during pro-democracy protests. Protesters often stated that they did not use the blue ensign to endorse Hong Kong independence or the return of Hong Kong to British control, but rather because they felt that Hong Kong had greater freedom under British rule. The protesters also said that they used the flag to express the contrasting values of China and Hong Kong. Advocates of the Hong Kong Independence Movement and the Hong Kong Autonomy Movement use a derivative of the blue ensign, without the British Union Jack and with the Chinese characters for Hong Kong (香港) in the centre of the arms rather than the standard English "Hong Kong". The right to display the old flag was protected under the Hong Kong Bill of Rights Ordinance and the Hong Kong Basic Law as an expression of free speech. Despite this, when the old flag began appearing in protests, pro-Beijing newspapers called for it to be banned. The pro-Beijing camp views the flag as a symbol of colonialism and a reminder of China's losses during the era of New Imperialism.

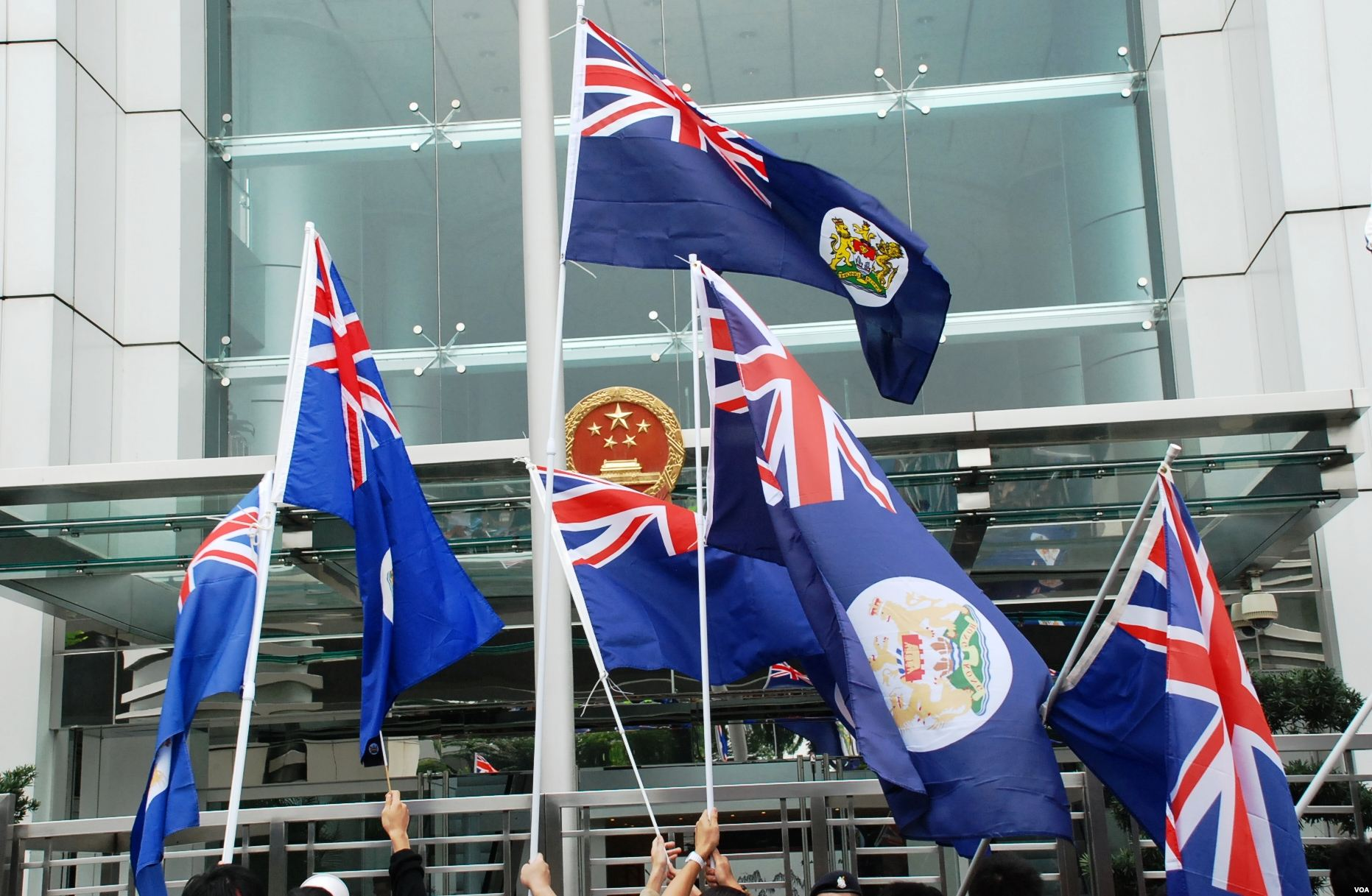
Protestors in 2012 using the colonial flags

The then Chief Executive of Hong Kong, C.Y. Leung, requested that people not use the blue ensign as a symbol of protest against government, stating: "People unhappy with the government don't need to wave the British flag to express discontent". China's Politburo Standing Committee member, Yu Zhengsheng, stated that "The Chinese people will not accept some Hongkongers waving the colonial flag" to protest against mainlanders going to Hong Kong to give birth. Critics also stated that the usage of the blue ensign was based on a selective view of British rule in Hong Kong, instead referencing early segregation and the imposition of martial law during the 1967 Hong Kong riots.

In early 2013, pro-democracy protestors calling for the resignation of Chief Executive Leung Chun Ying flew the old colonial flag. The Chinese authorities expressed their disapproval of the flag's use and Leung requested that the protesters stop flying the flag.

Despite being a popular protest flag, the leaders of the Umbrella Movement requested that participants of the movement not use the flag, as they intended to protest without intentionally provoking Chinese authorities or the Hong Kong Police Force. The flag has also been used outside of Hong Kong; in the United Kingdom, the blue ensign has been used as a symbol of protest to pressure the government of the United Kingdom to ensure the Sino-British Joint Declaration is fulfilled.

During the 2019–20 Hong Kong protests, protesters broke into the Legislative Council Complex and draped the British Hong Kong flag over the desk of the President of the Legislative Council of Hong Kong at the head of the chamber.

In the wake of the protests, and in the context of the passing of the Hong Kong national security law in 2020, the flag's use may be interpreted as promoting separatism and foreign influence and result in investigation. However, this is not always the case. After the death of Elizabeth II, a tribute outside the British consulate in Hong Kong used the colonial flag without formal punishment. The flag has also continued to be displayed by some businesses and individuals without issue.

== See also ==
- Historical flags of the British Empire and the overseas territories
