= Public Seal of Hong Kong =

- Traditional Chinese: 香港公印
Transcriptions
Yue: Cantonese
- Yale Romanization: Hēung góng gūng yan
- Jyutping: Hoeng1 gong2 gung1 jan3

The Public Seal of Hong Kong, formally known as Public Seal of the Hong Kong Special Administrative Region is the seal for certifying government documents and legislations of Hong Kong. It is held by the Chief Executive.

Prior to the transfer of sovereignty to China in 1997, it was known as the Public Seal of the Colony of Hong Kong, used to give authority to official documents and granting Royal Assent in Hong Kong. The Governor was the keeper of the seal.

== History ==
The Governor of the Crown Colony of Hong Kong had possessed and used a public seal from the foundation of the colony in 1843. Article VI of the letters patent issued to the Governor stated: "The Governor shall keep and use the Public Seal of the Colony for sealing all things whatsoever that shall pass the said Public Seal."

== Description of the colonial seal ==
=== 1939–1948 Public seal ===
Design: Originally created by Mr. B. Wyon, Her Majesty's Medallist in Chief, in 1841, the seal is engraved as follows. In the centre an oval medallion in which is depicted Hong Kong harbour with, in the foreground, a wharf with three people and five bales of merchandise on it; in the middleground, a Chinese junk under sail and a three-masted European-style sailing ship with bare yardarms; and in the background, mountains comprising the Peak District of Hong Kong. The medallion is encircled by a scroll surmounted with the Royal Arms and supporters and bearing the words 'Hong Kong' in the lower portion. Around the lower half of the medallion is a second scroll with the words 'King Defender of the Faith Emperor of India'. Encircling the whole are the words 'George VI by the Grace of God of Great Britain Ireland and the British Dominions beyond the Seas'. On the side the seal bears the hallmark of the Royal Mint.

Holders: When this seal was introduced the Governor was Sir Geoffry Alexander Stafford Northcote who held the post from 28 October 1937 until 10 September 1941. He was followed by Sir Mark Aitchison Young whose tenure was interrupted by the occupation of Hong Kong by Japan on 25 December 1941. Sir Mark resumed his governorship following the defeat of Japan in August 1945. He was succeeded in turn by Sir Alexander Grantham on 25 July 1947 who was governor when the public seal was replaced.

=== 1948–1952 Public seal ===
Design: Following Indian independence the previous year, a Royal Proclamation issued in 1948 gave notice that the words 'Emperor of India' were to be omitted from all instruments bearing the Royal Style and Title. In October 1948 the seal was withdrawn from use and replaced by another of a similar design but with the Royal Style and Title amended.

Holder: Sir Alexander Grantham

=== 1952–1997 Public seal ===
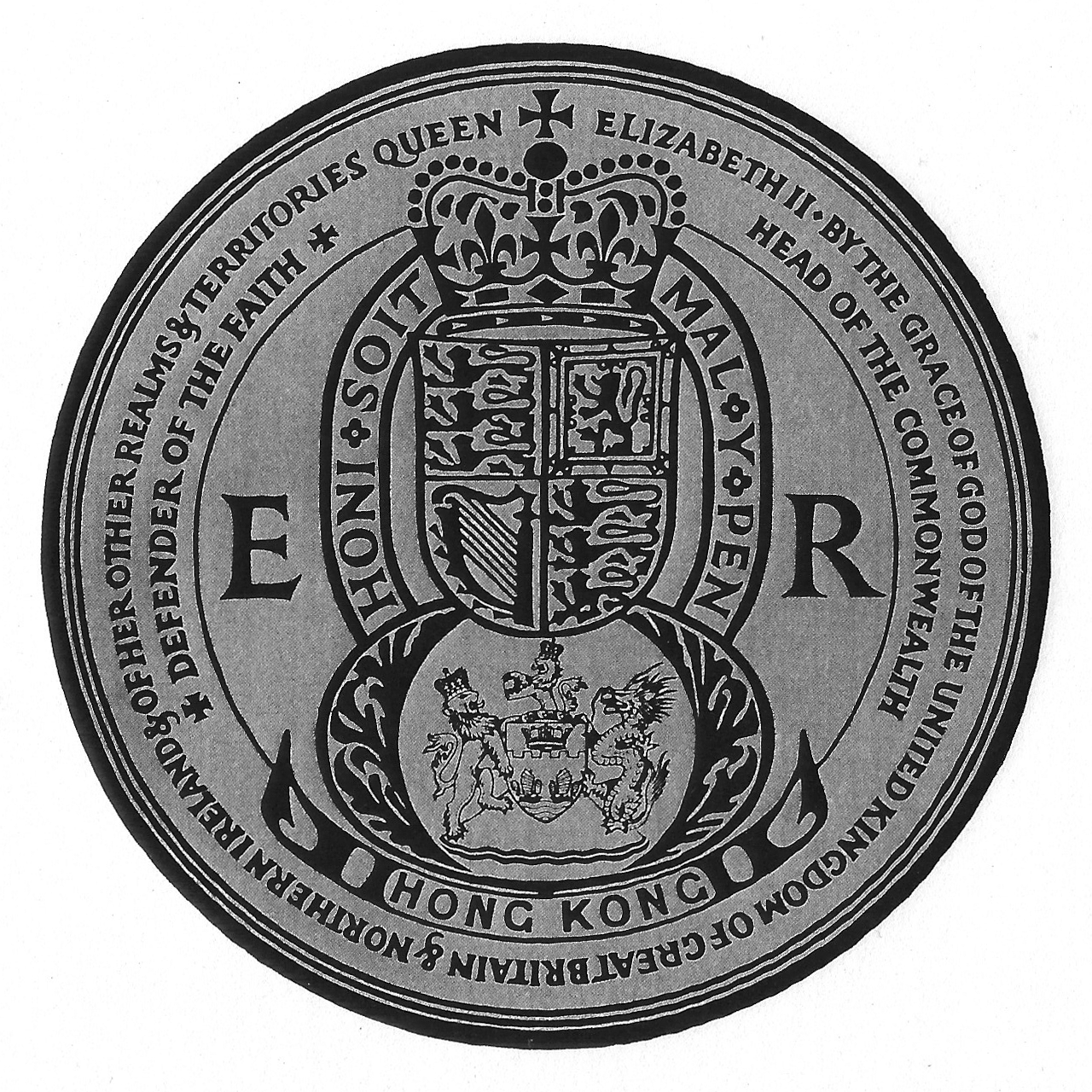
Seal from 1952 - 1997

Design: Queen Elizabeth II succeeded King George VI as the Queen of the United Kingdom. The Public Seal was revised to the current Coat of Arms of the United Kingdom with the Royal Style and Title amended.

Holders: Sir Alexander Grantham, Sir Robert Brown Black, Sir David Clive Crosbie Trench, Sir Murray MacLehose, Sir Edward Youde, Sir David Wilson and The Rt. Hon. Chris Patten

At the midnight hour of 1 July 1997 when British sovereignty over Hong Kong ended, a junior Executive Council official removed the Public Seal and formally defaced it with a ragged cross, using a chisel.

Under the Public Records (Access) Rules, the public can request to see government documents where contents were made available to the public and older than 30 years old. Currently, one of the metal seals used between 1939–1948 is viewable at the Government Records Service, located at the Hong Kong Public Records Building.
