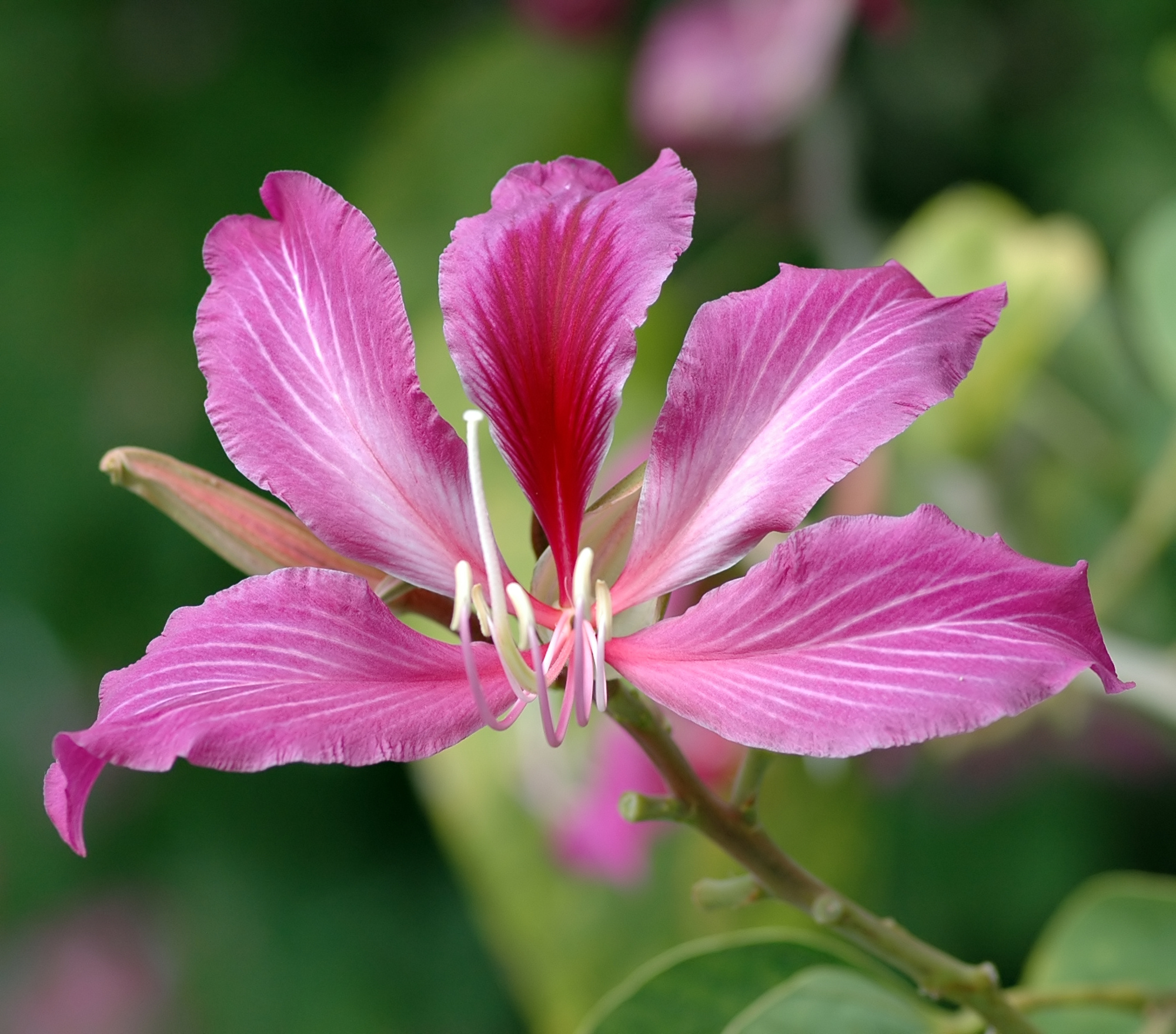
- Flower

Scientific classification
- Kingdom: Plantae
- Clade: Tracheophytes
- Clade: Angiosperms
- Clade: Eudicots
- Clade: Rosids
- Order: Fabales
- Family: Fabaceae
- Genus: Bauhinia
- Species: B. × blakeana

Binomial name
- Bauhinia × blakeana Dunn

= Bauhinia × blakeana =

Species of legume

Bauhinia × blakeana (/baʊˈhɪniə bleɪkiˈɑːnə/), commonly called the Hong Kong orchid tree, is a hybrid leguminous tree of the genus Bauhinia. It has large thick leaves and striking purplish red flowers. The fragrant, orchid-like flowers are usually 10 to 15 centimetres (3.9 to 5.9 in) across, and bloom from early November to the end of March. Although now cultivated in many areas, it originated in Hong Kong in 1880 and apparently all of the cultivated trees derive from one cultivated at the Hong Kong Botanical Gardens and widely planted in Hong Kong starting in 1914. It is referred to as bauhinia in non-scientific literature though this is the name of the genus. It is sometimes called the Hong Kong orchid (Chinese: 香港蘭; Cantonese Yale: Hēunggóng làahn). In Hong Kong, it is most commonly referred to by its Chinese name of 洋紫荊 (yèuhng jígīng).

The Bauhinia double-lobed leaf is similar in shape to a heart or a butterfly, or a camel's footprint - hence the common name camel's foot. A typical leaf is 7 to 10 centimetres (2.8 to 3.9 in) long and 10 to 13 centimetres (3.9 to 5.1 in) wide, with a deep cleft dividing the apex. In Hong Kong the leaf is known as the "clever leaf" (聰明葉; chūngmìhng yihp), and is regarded as a symbol of wisdom. Some people use the leaves to make bookmarks in the hope that they will bring them good luck in their studies.

It is sterile, which means it does not generally produce seeds or fruits, and is a hybrid between Bauhinia variegata and Bauhinia purpurea. The 2008 research was able to identify the female parent as Bauhinia purpurea, but it could not differentiate the male parent from Bauhinia variegata var. variegata or Bauhinia variegata var. candida. This is not unexpected, as Bauhinia variegata var. candida is a white-flowered form of Bauhinia variegata var. variegata, and not a separate species or sub-species. The 2005 research suggested Bauhinia × blakeana is genetically closer to Bauhinia variegata, while the 2008 research indicated it is closer to Bauhinia purpurea instead. In 2025 the Bauhinia Genome Project definitively determined through a complete telomere-to-telomere reference assembly that Bauhinia purpurea is the maternal parent, and Bauhinia variegata the parental strain. Also supporting the hypothesis that Bauhinia × blakeana more likely originated from a rare single, recent hybridization event rather than recurrent gene flow.

Propagation is by grafting. As it is only known in cultivation, it can also be named as a cultivar: Bauhinia 'Blakeana'. Hong Kong orchid trees are usually sterile, yet here, too, there are exceptions. One tree has been found in Hong Kong that produces seeds, perhaps indicating that evolution or mutation has occurred, or that even though Bauhinia × blakeana is perhaps sterile when self-pollinated (the scientific study in 2005 established the low fertility of Bauhinia × blakeana's pollen when compared with its parental species Bauhinia purpurea or Bauhinia variegata), however, it may perhaps be able to produce seeds when pollinated instead by its parental species Bauhinia purpurea or Bauhinia variegata or other related Bauhinia species. More scientific research will need to be carried out, e.g., artificial controlled cross-pollination experiments to confirm the ability of Bauhinia × blakeana in backcross or outcross to produce (fertile) seeds.

Lawrence Ramsden of the University of Hong Kong's Department of Botany is conducting the search to find out if there are any more individuals that can produce seeds – if so, they could benefit propagation of the tree for horticulture. Two previous instances of seeds found from Bauhinia × blakeana specimens failed to germinate. Development of seed pods (but no seeds) from B. × blakeana have been observed on three trees in Tai Po and Kowloon in Hong Kong. These three B. × blakeana trees with numerous seed pods were grown alongside B. purpurea, B. variegata (white flowered form) and B. variegata. At the time (March in Hong Kong), both B. blakeana and B. purpurea were flowering, therefore, the pollens for development of B. blakeana seed pods may have been contributed from B. purpurea.

== History ==
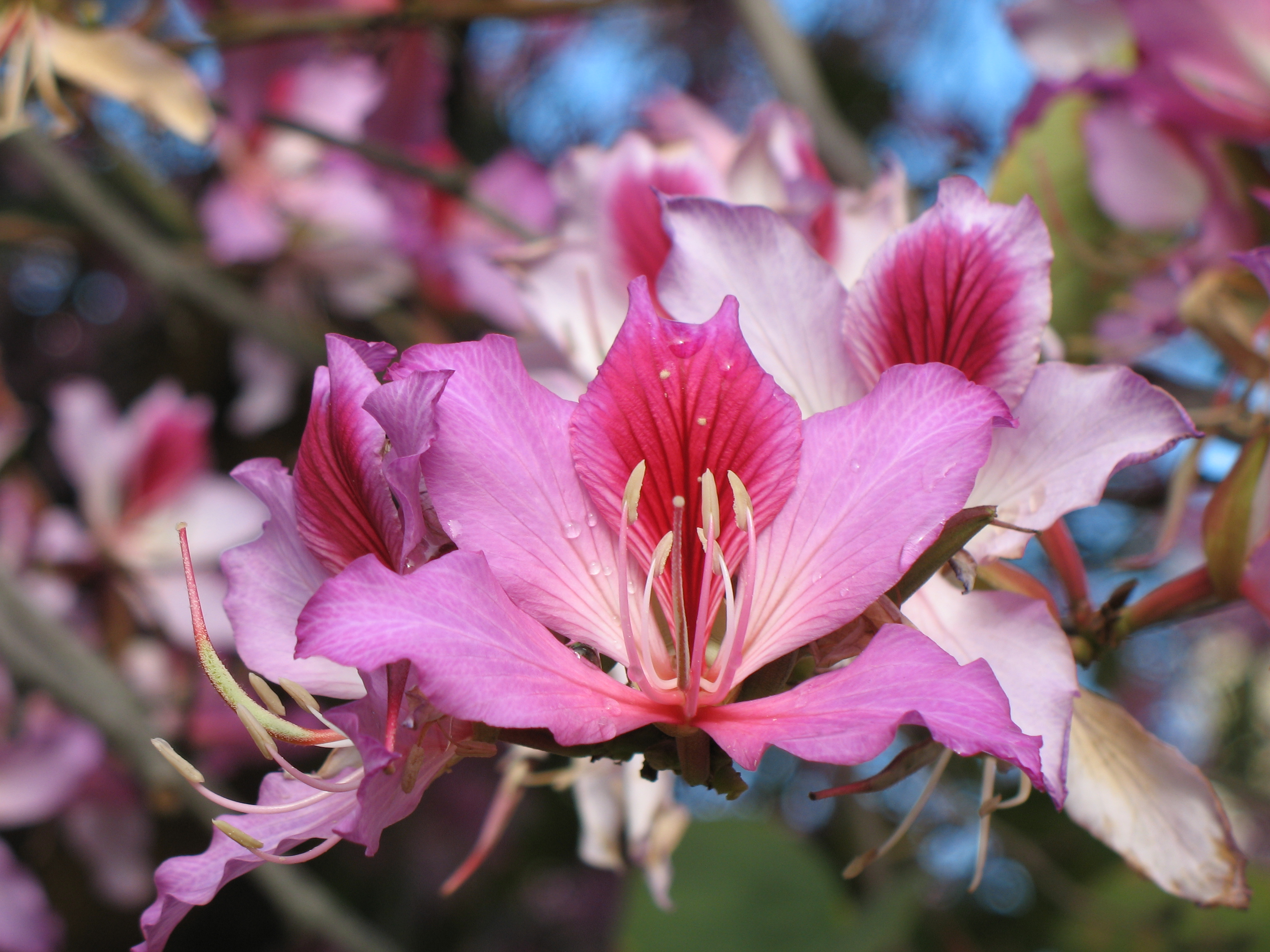
Flower

This tree was discovered in around 1880 by a French Catholic Missionary of the Paris Foreign Missions (MEP), near the ruins of a house above the shore-line of western Hong Kong island near Pok Fu Lam and propagated to the formal botanical gardens in Victoria/Central.

The first thorough scientific description of the tree was made by Stephen Troyte Dunn, Superintendent of the Botanical and Forestry Department, who assigned it to the genus Bauhinia in his paper of 1908. Dunn named the tree for "Sir Henry and Lady Blake", the former being Sir Henry Blake, British Governor of Hong Kong, from 1898 to 1903. Sir Henry and Lady Blake were thus thanked for their promotion of the Hong Kong Botanic Gardens.

Dunn's description was based on the trees in the Hong Kong Botanical Gardens, which had been grown from cuttings taken from trees cultivated in the French Mission at Pokfulam, on the west coast of Hong Kong Island, which in turn were derived from a tree (or trees) found nearby. As far as is known, all the French Mission cuttings were taken from a single tree, so all Hong Kong orchid trees today would be clones of the original tree. Dr Lawrence Ramsden of the University of Hong Kong’s Department of Botany estimates that this clonal origin would mean that B. × blakeana could be susceptible to decimation by epidemics, though it has so far avoided major diseases.

In order to avoid the susceptibility of B. × blakeana to diseases due to the lack of genetic diversity from the current clones of a single B. × blakeana tree back in 1880s, efforts should be made to re-hybridise the parental species of B. × blakeana, ie, crossing B. purpurea and B. variegata to generate new hybrid specimens of B. × blakeana instead to add new genetic materials to the current stock of B. × blakeana.

To solve the mystery of Hong Kong Bauhinia's parentage a community crowdfunded Bauhinia Genome project was launched in 2015, finally completing the genome and determing the maternal and parenal species in 2025.

== Usage as an emblem ==
Bauhinia × blakeana was adopted as the floral emblem of Hong Kong by the Urban Council in 1965.

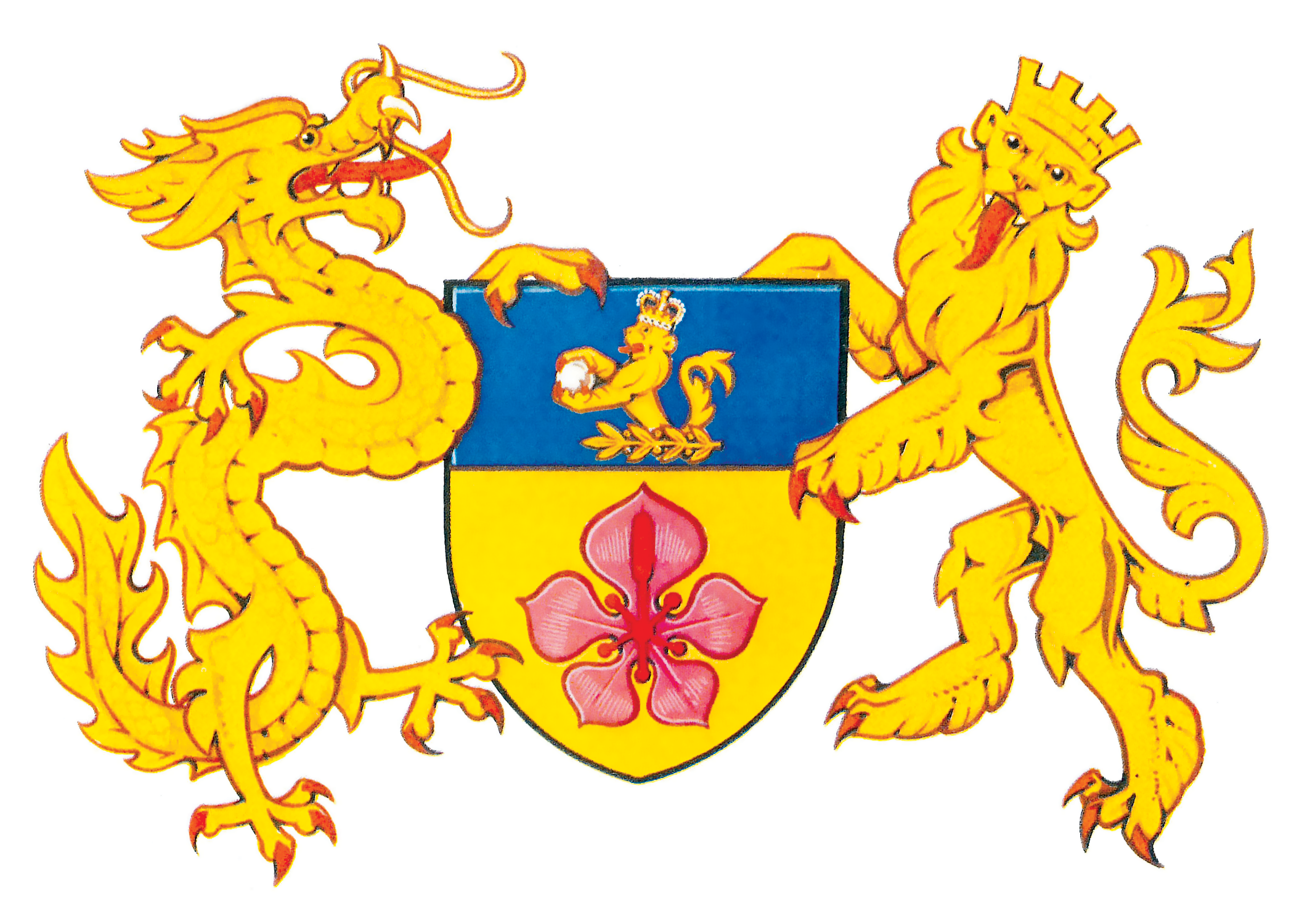
Historical Urban Council of Hong Kong armorial bearings, granted by the College of Arms in 1979. The council was abolished on 31 December 1999.

The flag of Hong Kong Special Administrative Region of the People's Republic of China in 1997.

Since 1997 the flower appears on Hong Kong's coat of arms, its flag and its coins; its Chinese name has also been frequently shortened as 洋紫荊/洋紫荆. A statue of the plant has been erected in Golden Bauhinia Square in Hong Kong. Although the flowers are bright pinkish purple in colour, they are depicted in white on the Flag of Hong Kong. Hong Kong Airlines uses BAUHINIA as its callsign.

The endemic plant of Hong Kong was introduced to Taiwan in 1967. In 1984 it was chosen to be the city flower of Chiayi City, in southwestern Taiwan.

Bauhinia × blakeana
- Traditional Chinese: 洋紫荊
- Simplified Chinese: 洋紫荆
Transcriptions
Standard Mandarin
- Hanyu Pinyin: yáng zǐjīng
Yue: Cantonese
- Yale Romanization: yèuhng jígīng
- Jyutping: joeng4 zi2 ging1
- IPA: [jœŋ˩ tsi˧˥ kɪŋ˥]

== Gallery ==
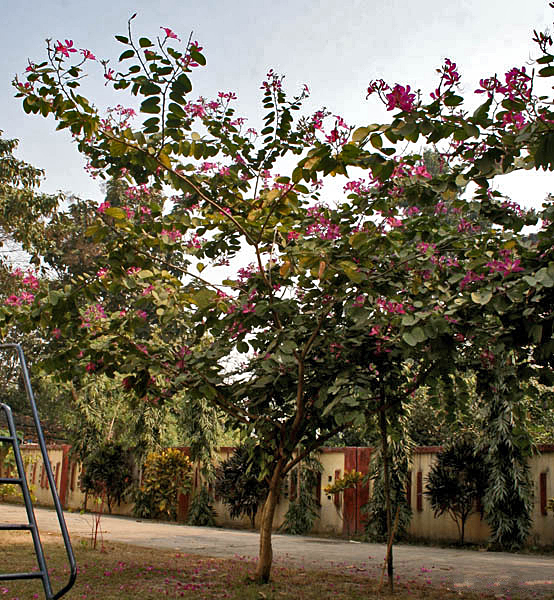
Tree in Kolkata, West Bengal, India.

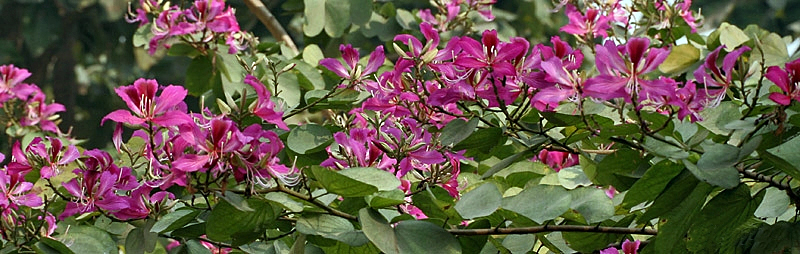
Flowers in Kolkata

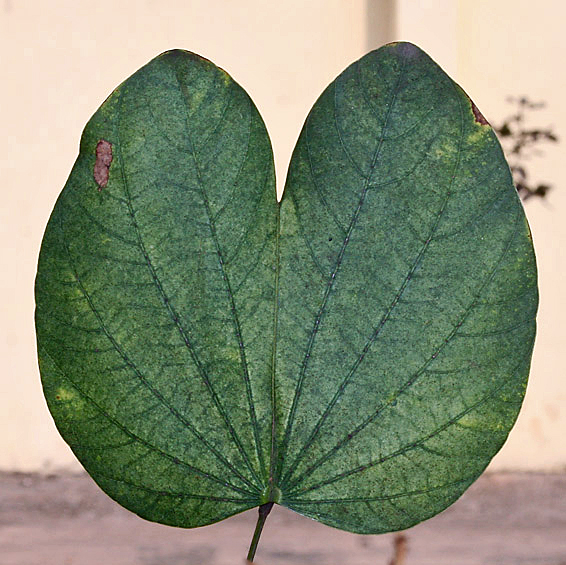
Leaf in Kolkata

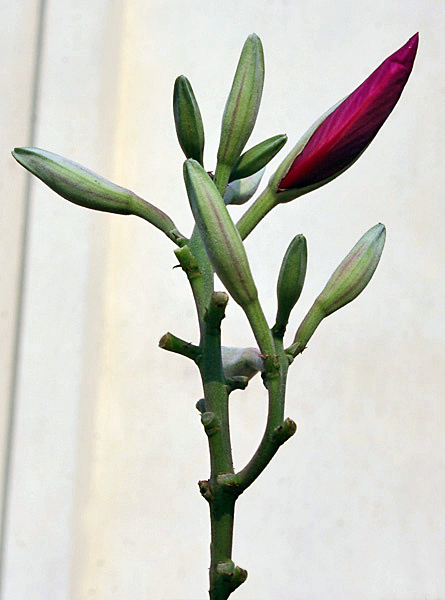
Flower buds in Kolkata

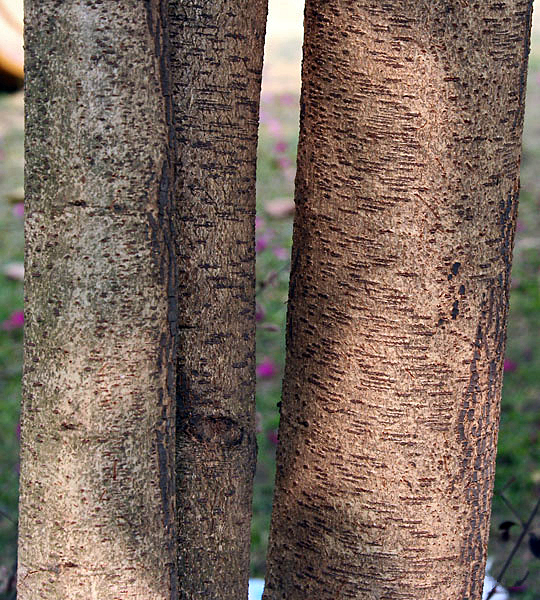
Bark in Kolkata

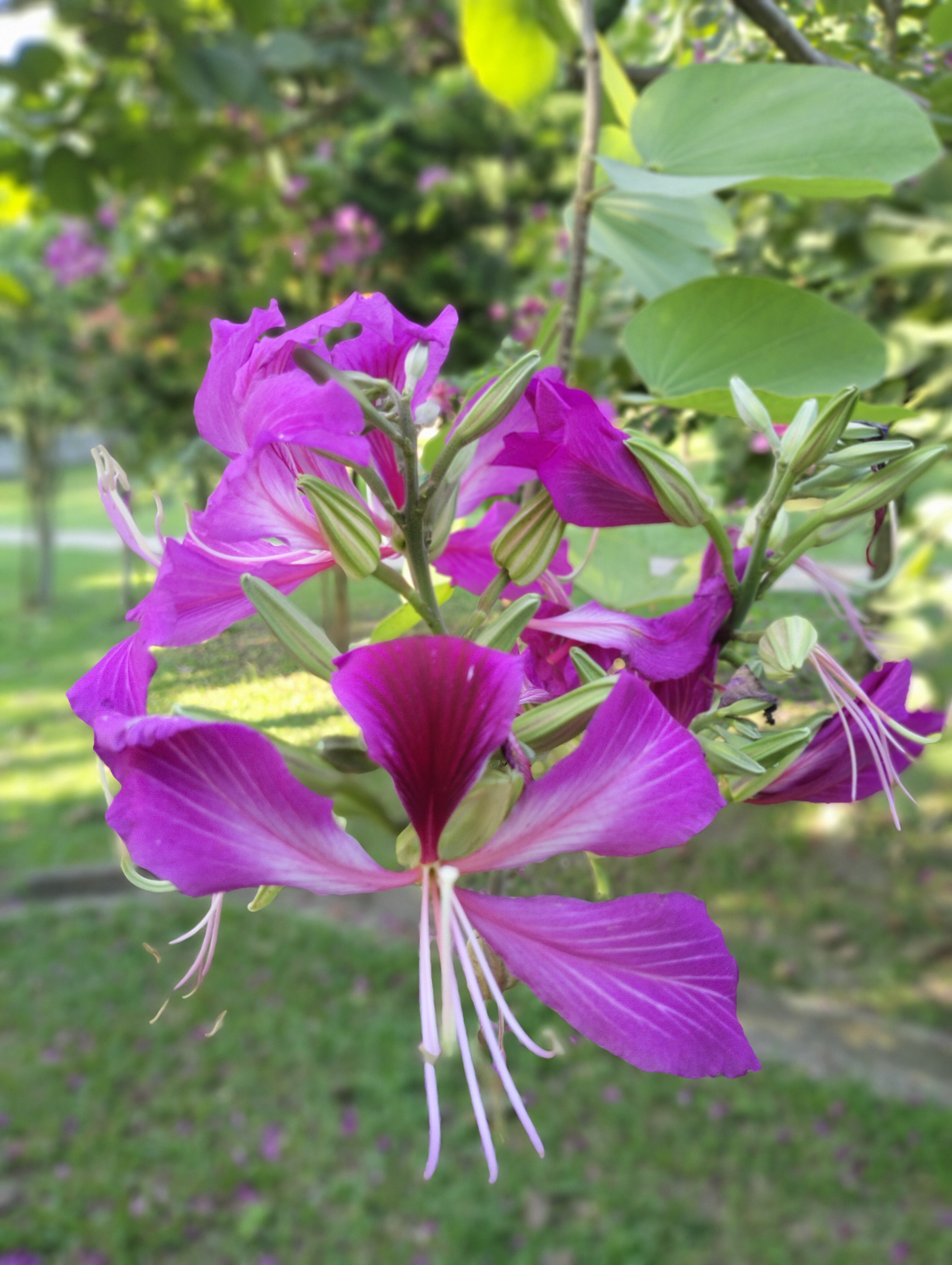
flower in Ajmiriganj, Sylhet, Bangladesh
