= List of Macanese flags =

This is a list of flags of Macau.

== Official flag ==
Flag	Duration	Use	Description
	1999–present	Flag of Macau	A lotus flower above a stylized bridge and water in white, beneath an arc of five gold, five-pointed stars on a green field.
	1999–present	Flag of Macau (vertical)	

=== Prefecture ===
Flag	Duration	Use	Description
	1975–1999	Old flag of Municipality of Macau	A blue field charged with the coat of arms of the Municipality of Macau. This was the flag used at sporting events and the 1999 China handover.
	1975–1999	Old flag of Municipality of Ilhas	An orange field charged with the coat of arms of the Municipality of Ilhas.
	1999–2001	Old flag of Municipality of Macau	A navy blue field charged with the coat of arms of the Municipality of Macau.
	1999–2001	Old flag of Municipality of Ilhas	A green field charged with the coat of arms of the Municipality of Ilhas.

== Historical flags ==
Flag	Duration	Use	Description
	1557–1707	Flag of Portugal, used in colonial era Macau	The Portuguese flag was used in colonial-era Macau, as there was no territorial flag.
	1707–1816	Flag of Portugal, used in colonial era Macau	The Portuguese flag was used in colonial-era Macau, as there was no territorial flag.
	1816–1830	Flag of Portugal, used in colonial era Macau	The Portuguese flag was used in colonial-era Macau, as there was no territorial flag.
	1830–1911	Flag of Portugal, used in colonial era Macau	The Portuguese flag was used in colonial-era Macau, as there was no territorial flag.
	1911–1999	Flag of Portugal, used in colonial era Macau	The Portuguese flag was used in colonial-era Macau, as there was no territorial flag.
	1951–1976	Flag of the Portuguese colonial Government of Macau	A light blue field charged with the official coat of arms of the Portuguese colony of Macau. During the Portuguese administration this flag also represented the territory of Macau in the international institutions, although it was not the official flag of the Portuguese colony.
	1975–1999	Flag of the Portuguese colonial Government of Macau	A light blue field charged with the official coat of arms of the Portuguese colony of Macau. During the Portuguese administration this flag also represented the territory of Macau in the international institutions, although it was not the official flag of the Portuguese colony.
	1975–1999	Variant flag of Portuguese colonial era of Macau	Semi-official variant without a mural crown representing the Kingdom of the Algarve castles in the coat of arms. This flag was found at the University of Macau in a photo of International University Sports Federation event and it was used in the parade of nations. Although this flag was never used officially, some sports media used it instead of the Portuguese Flag to represent the colony.

== Governor of Macau ==
Flag	Date	Use	Description
	1975–1999	Flag of the governor of Macau	

== Proposed flags ==
Flag	Duration	Use	Description
	1932	Colonial flag proposal	
	1965	Colonial flag proposal	
	1993	Proposal 1	Similar to the current flag of Macau, but the lotus is stylised differently and is found in a disc, with the stars inside the flower.
	1993	Proposal 2	A vertical red-white-red triband; the middle band has a depiction of St. Paul's Cathedral in Macau.
	1993	Proposal 3	A horizontal red-white-red triband; the wide middle band has a stylised "M" standing for Macau and a large star above four smaller stars representative of China.
	1993	Proposal 4	A vertical bicolour of green and red, resembling the flag of Portugal, with a stylised lotus flower in the lower half.
	1993	Proposal 5	A symbol with a red, a blue, and a green circle arranged in a pyramid with a yellow star inside the red circle over a horizontal bicolour of white and yellow.
	1993	Proposal 6	A white flag. The upper half has a red and blue stylised "M" with a large five-pointed star containing a red lotus blossom. The lower half has two blue horizontal bands.
	1993	Proposal 7	Similar to the current flag of Macau, but the flag colour is red, and the emblem excludes the bridge and water underneath the lotus on the current flag.
	1993	Proposal 8	A stylized yellow lotus flower with an arch of yellow stars on a red flag.
	1993	Proposal 9	A stylized white lotus flower with an arch of yellow stars on a red flag.
	1993	Proposal 10	A depiction of the Guia Fortress Lighthouse, the oldest in Asia, under a golden star; a white halo ring forms around the lighthouse, and two light cones divide the red upper half and the blue lower half.
	1993	Proposal 11	A vertical bicolour of green and red, resembling the flag of Portugal, with a white gull in the upper half and a white depiction of the Governor Nobre de Carvalho Bridge in the lower half.
	1993	Proposal 12	A stylized white lotus flower on a red flag with an arch of yellow stars above the flower.
	1993	Proposal 13	Green, with a red triangle, its base at the hoist and apex on the fly edge (i.e., a pile throughout), filled with the stars from the flag of China.
	1993	Proposal 14	A stylised lotus flower, with a red-outlined star within the top petal.
	1993	Proposal 15	Another depiction of the Gov. Nobre de Carvalho Bridge on a red flag, with the five yellow stars running parallel to the upper surface of the bridge.
