= Provincial-level divisions of China =

First level administrative divisions of China

Provincial-level divisions 省级行政区 Shěngjí Xíngzhèngqū
- Provinces; Autonomous regions; Municipalities; Special administrative regions
- Category: Unitary state
- Location: China
- Number: 34 (Note: Including the disputed Taiwan Province.)
- Subdivisions: Sub-provincial city, prefectures

Province-level administrative divisions
- Simplified Chinese: 省级行政区
- Traditional Chinese: 省級行政區
Transcriptions
Standard Mandarin
- Hanyu Pinyin: Shěngjí xíngzhèngqū

The People's Republic of China is officially divided into 34 provincial-level administrative divisions, the first level of administrative division in the country. There are four types of divisions at the provincial level:

- Provinces (23)
- Autonomous regions (5)
- Direct-administered municipalities (4)
- Special administrative regions (SARs, 2)

Provincial-level division can be traced back to the Yuan dynasty. The political status of Taiwan Province, as well as small portions of other provinces, are disputed.

== Government ==
The legislative branch at the provincial level is the People's Congress, modeled on the National People's Congress. Provincial People's Congresses have had legislative powers since 1979, and pass laws on a wide variety of issues. The executive branch is the Provincial People's Government, led by a governor in the provinces, a mayor in provincial-level cities, a chairman in the autonomous regions. The head of the government is assisted by a number of subordinate officials such as Vice-Governors. The head of the People's Government is appointed by the State Council. (Note: Subordinate provincial officials are appointed by province-level committees.) That said, the People's Governments are responsible to both the State Council and the regional People's Congress, and implement the decisions of both bodies. They also pass the State Council's instructions down to the lower levels of the administration. Province-level governments have the power to set budgets and raise revenue, although they are subject to the State Council's approval. They can pursue development projects without seeking central government approval.

The Xinjiang Production and Construction Corps is commonly considered an entity parallel to the provincial-level local governments in official Chinese sources.

=== Provincial-level party structure ===
As with the central government, provincial-level divisions are governed by parallel party and state structures. Each province-level branch of the Chinese Communist Party (CCP) holds a Party Congress every five years. The congress will elect a Party Committee, which in turn elects a Standing Committee. The Standing Committee includes a party secretary, who is the leader of the CCP in that provincial-level division. The Standing Committee usually includes the top members of the People's Government as well.

=== Provincial People's Government buildings ===
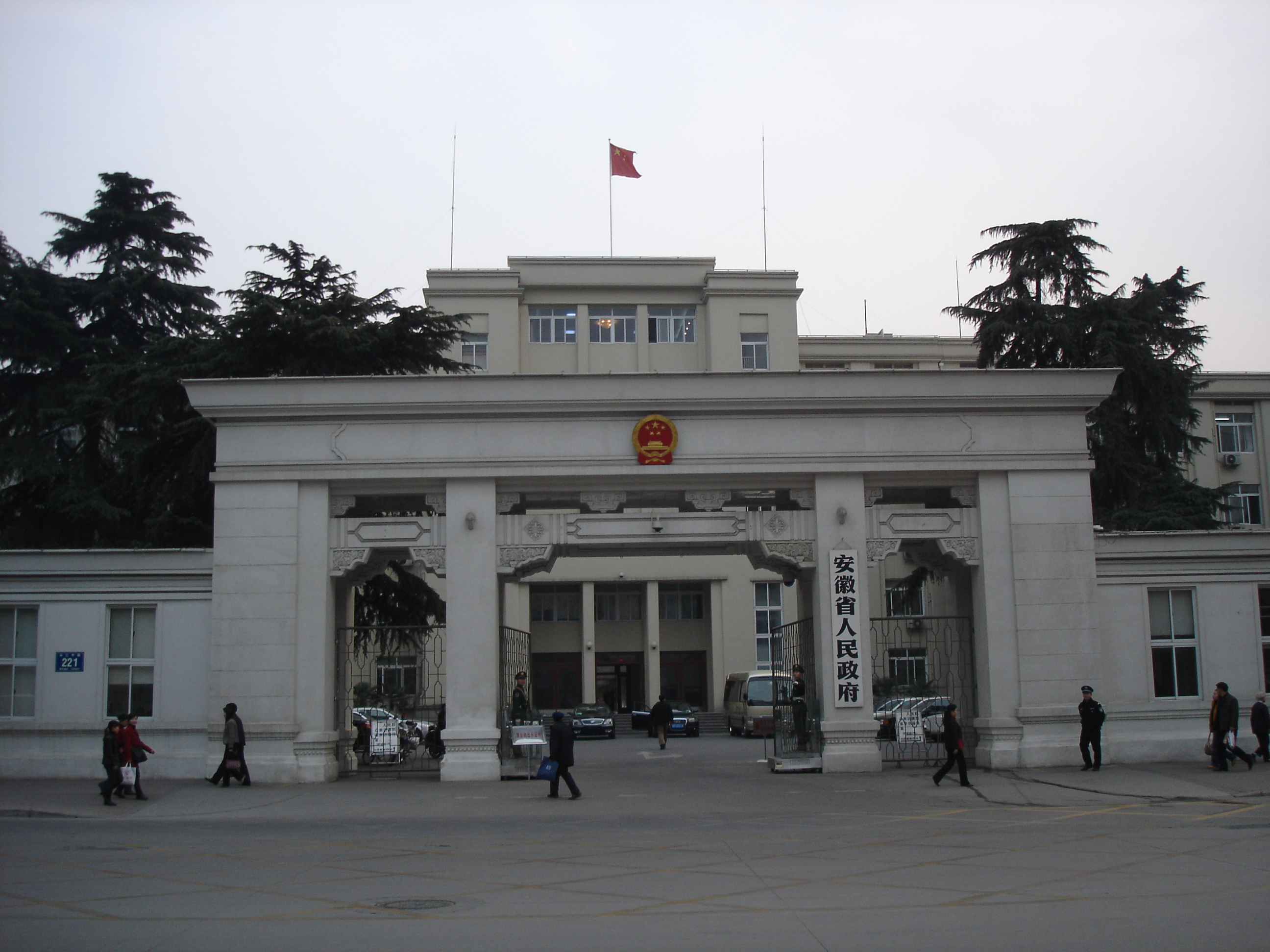
Anhui Provincial People's Government building

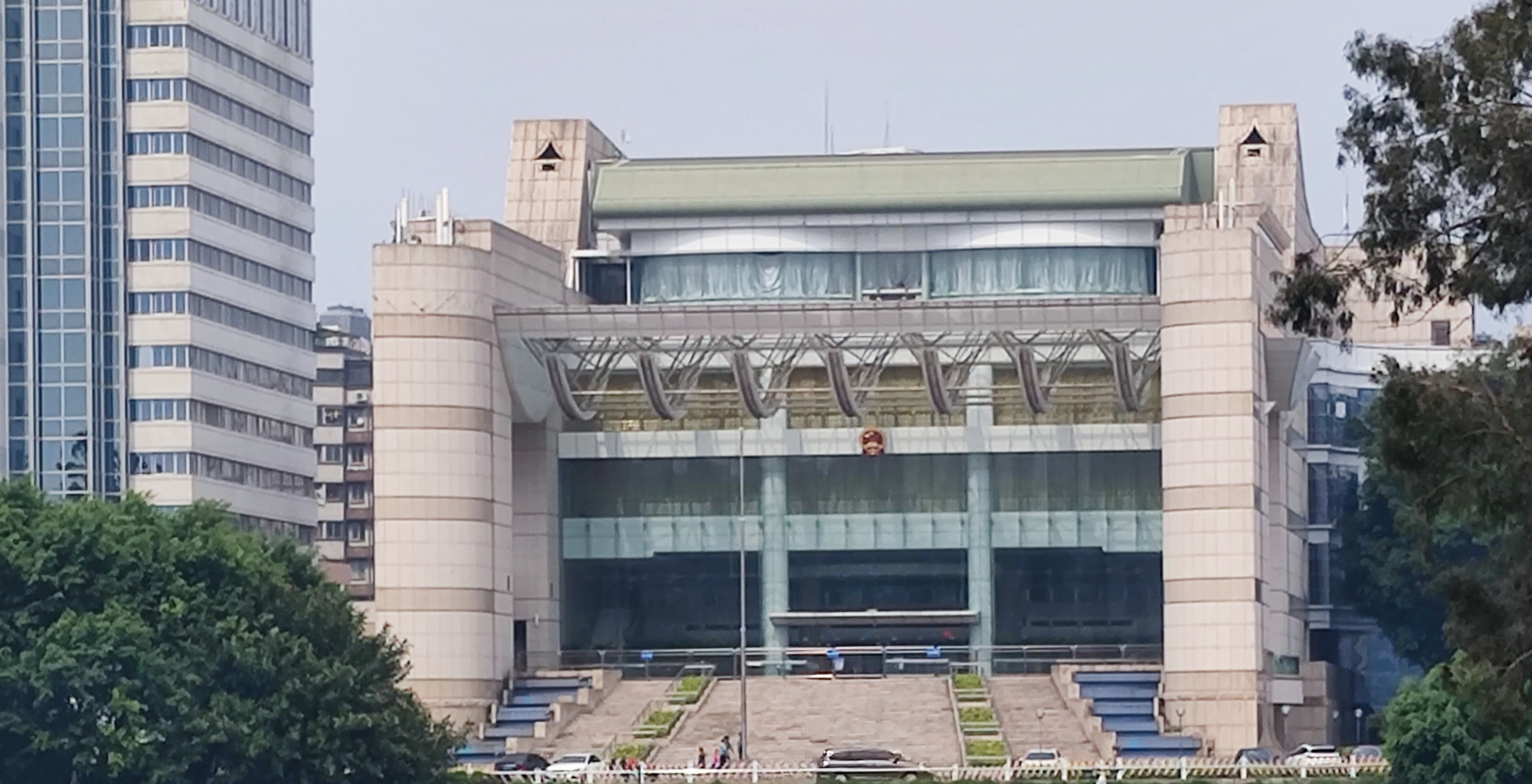
Fujian Provincial People's Government building

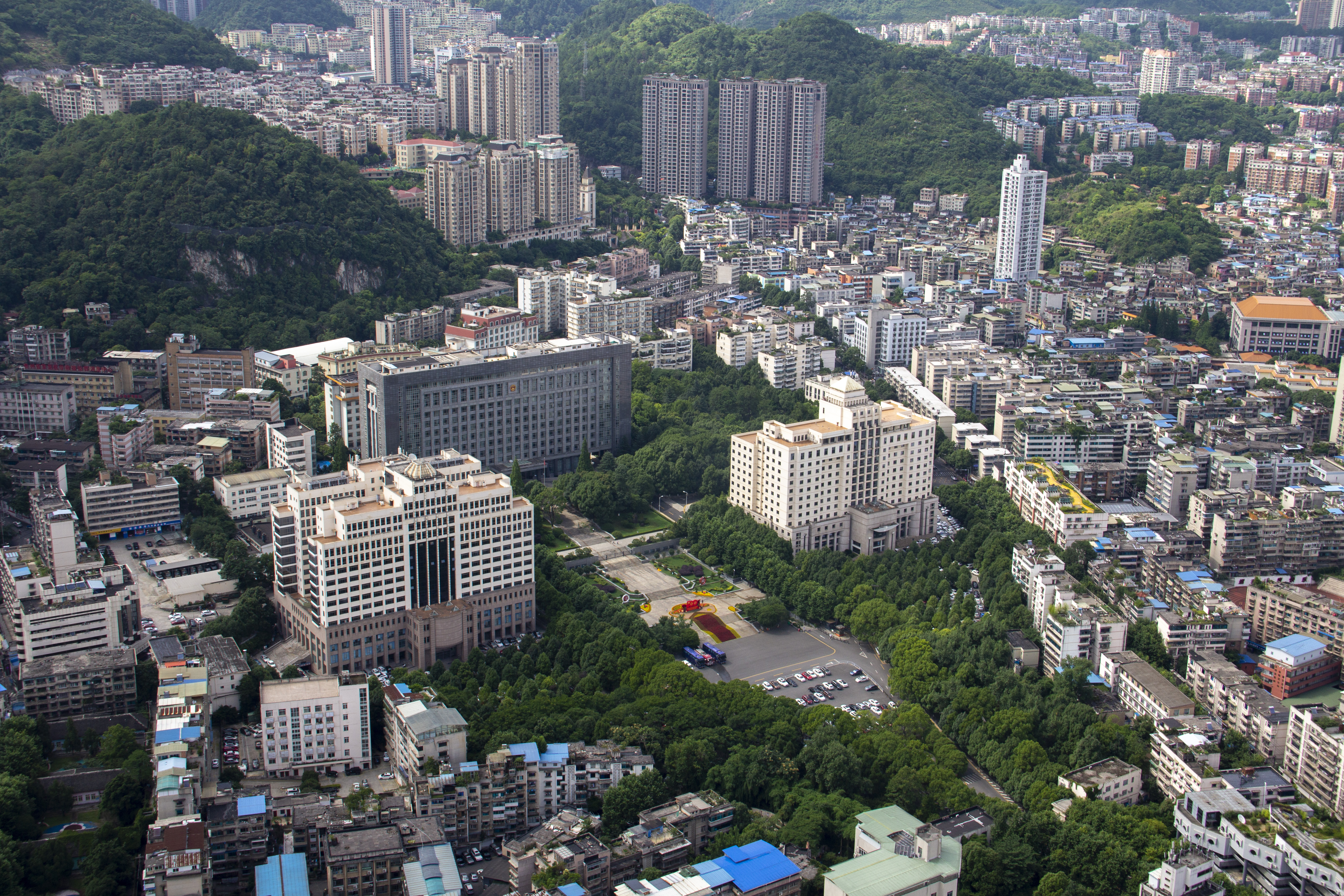
Guizhou Provincial People's Government building

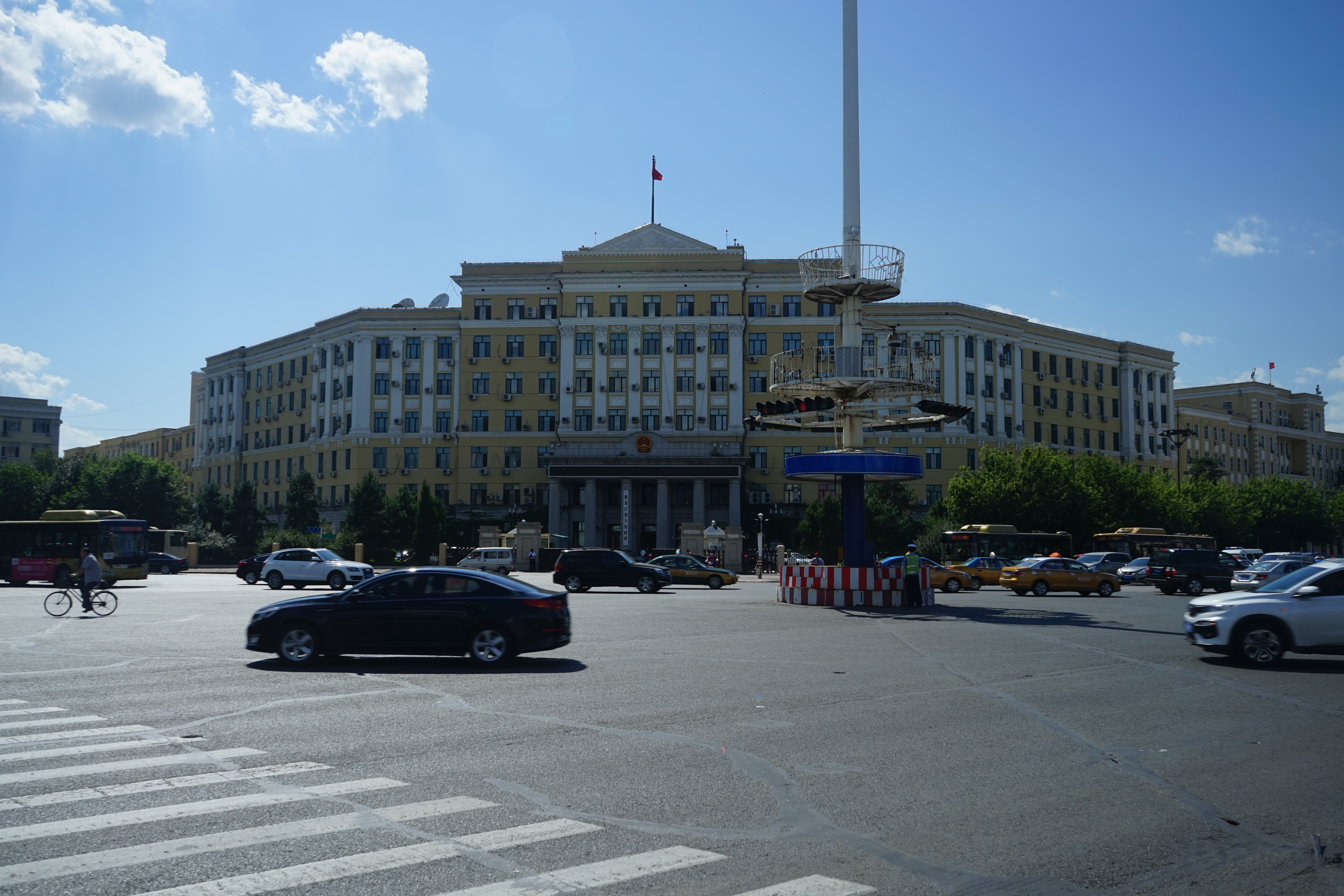
Heilongjiang Provincial People's Government building

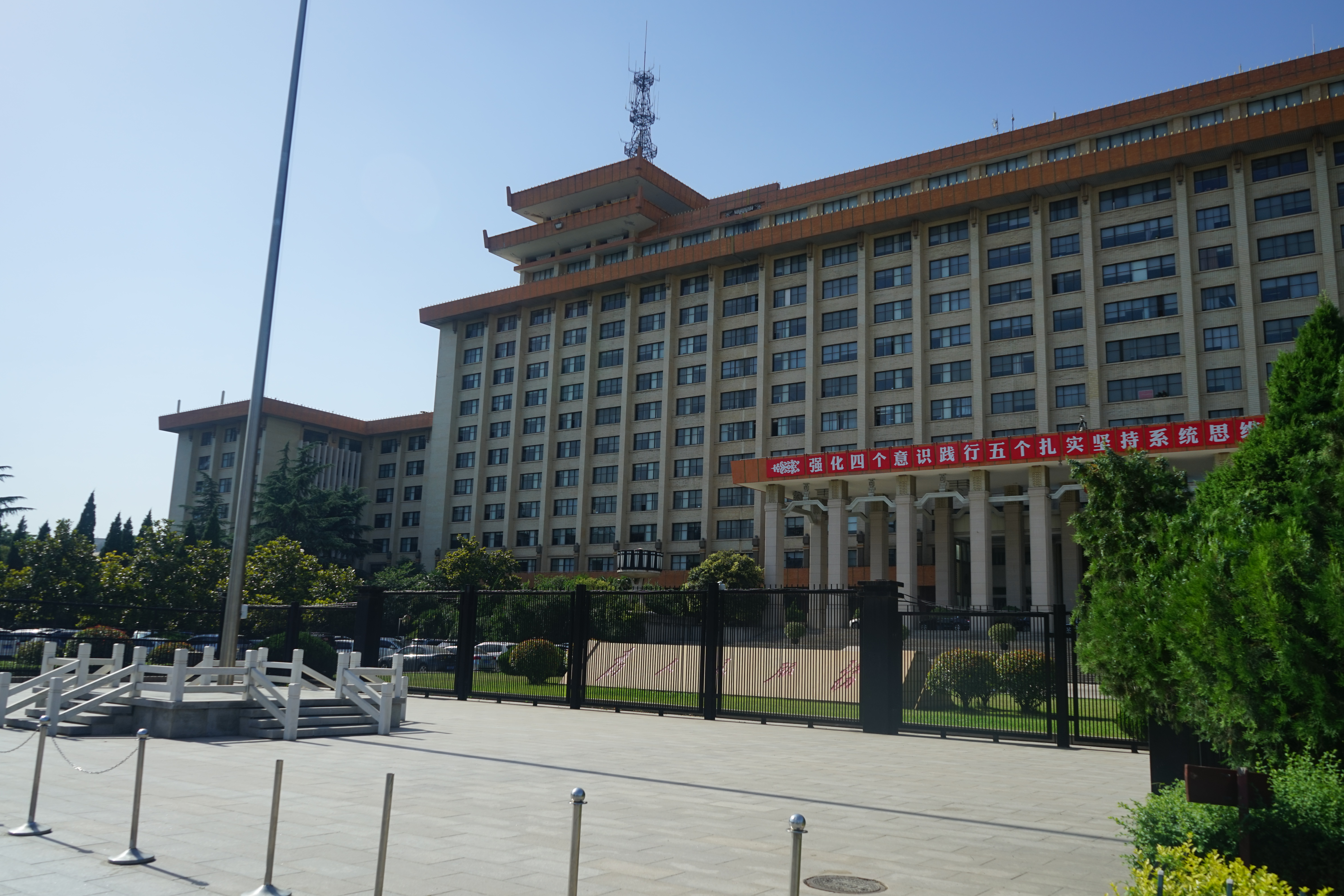
Shaanxi Provincial People's Government building

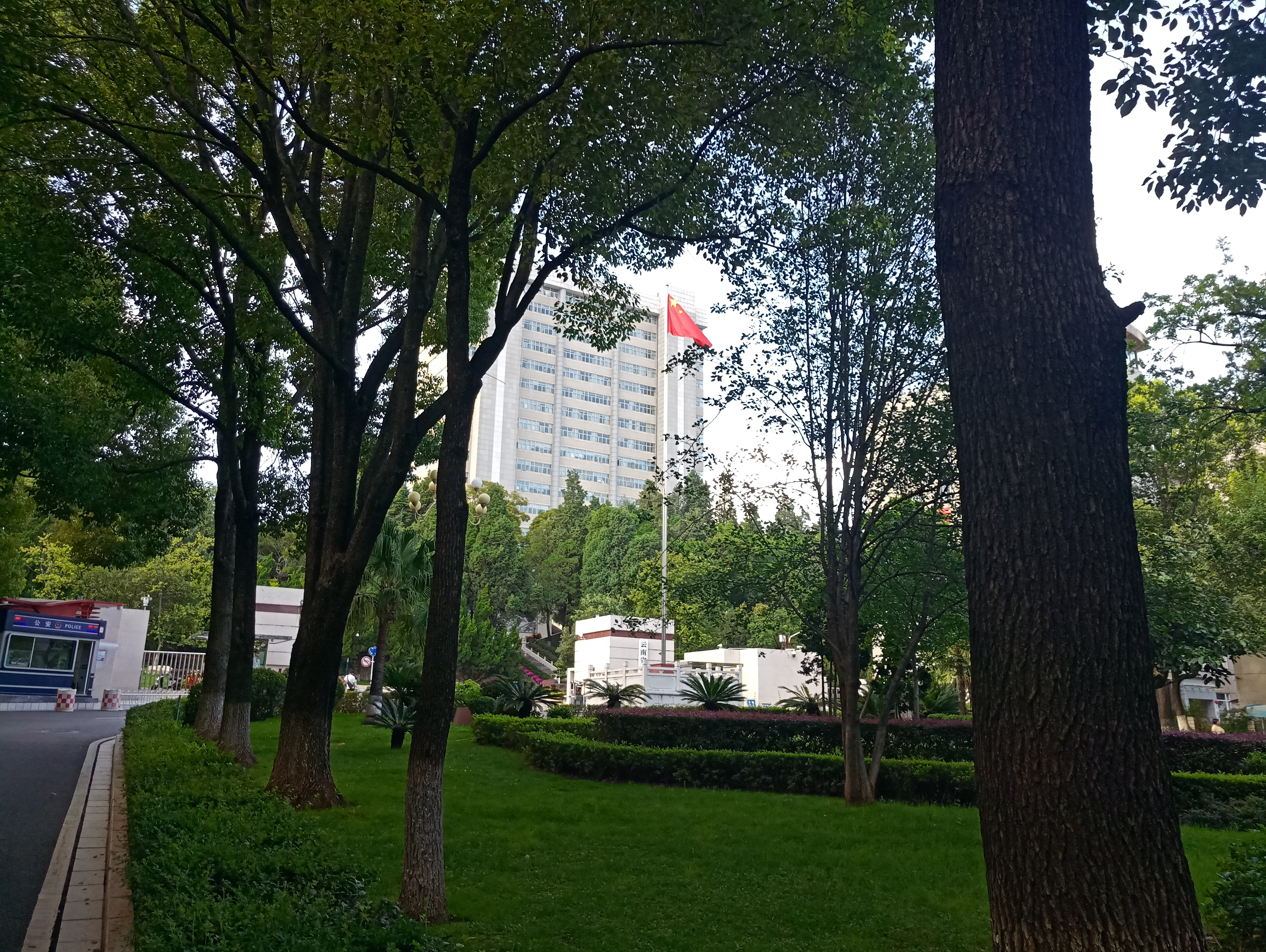
Yunnan Provincial People's Government building

== History ==
The first provincial-level divisions were created in the Yuan dynasty, and have remained one of the most stable forms of Chinese government since then. They were created to help the Imperial court manage local county governments, which were too numerous and far-flung to be managed directly. The number of provinces grew steadily during subsequent dynasties, reaching 28 by the time of the Republic of China. Under the Nationalist Government, large cities began to be classified separately from other administrative units. Starting in 1930, some of these "special cities" became "direct jurisdiction cities" under the central government, the predecessor of province-level cities. During the Warlord Era, provinces became largely or completely autonomous and exercised significant national influence. Province-level units proliferated and under the early People's Republic there were over 50.

In the mid-1950s, the People's Republic (PRC) made several major reforms to province-level administration. Despite closely modelling other aspects of the PRC on the Soviet Union, the CCP's experience with territorial disintegration during the Warlord Era led them to reject the Soviet federal structure. Instead, the total number of provinces was significantly reduced and the unitary state structure was retained. Most direct jurisdiction cities were abolished, although a few became province-level cities. Limited autonomy was granted to ethnic minorities in five new "Autonomous Regions" (see below). People's Congresses were set up to run province-level governments. During the Cultural Revolution, these Congresses each elected a revolutionary committee to exercise both executive and legislative power when they were not in session. Provincial-level divisions had limited independent authority before the period of reform and opening up, due to the centrally planned nature of the economy. Their main role was to implement the decisions made by the central government regarding production goals, raising and spending of revenue, and resource allocation. However, in contrast with the Soviet system, there was some degree of regional autonomy. Many provincial governments ran smaller manufacturing firms independently of the central government. Since 1979, the central government has granted increased decision-making authority to provincial level governments. In turn, they have devolved the power to make local regulations to cities and other local governments.

== List of provincial-level divisions ==
GB/T 2260-2007	ISO	Province	Chinese Hanyu Pinyin	Capital	Population (Note: as of 2020)	Density (Note: per km^{2})	Area (Note: km^{2})	Abbreviation (Note: Abbreviation in the parentheses is informal)
AH	CN-AH	Anhui	安徽省; Ānhuī Shěng	Hefei	61,027,171	436.29	139,879	皖 Wǎn
BJ	CN-BJ	Beijing Municipality	北京市; Běijīng Shì	Tongzhou	21,893,095	1,334.05	16,411	京 Jīng
CQ	CN-CQ	Chongqing Municipality	重庆市; Chóngqìng Shì	Yuzhong	32,054,159	388.99	82,403	渝 Yú
FJ	CN-FJ	Fujian (Note: Most of the Fujian Province is administered by the People's Republic of China (PRC) while the Republic of China includes Kinmen County (Quemoy) and Lienchiang County (Matsu) formerly under its own streamlined Fujian Province.)	福建省; Fújiàn Shěng	Fuzhou	41,540,086	335.66	123,756	闽 Mǐn
GD	CN-GD	Guangdong (Note: Most of the Guangdong Province is administered by the People's Republic of China (PRC) while the Republic of China on Taiwan includes Pratas Island (also named Tungsha Island or Dongsha Island) as part of the Cijin District, Kaohsiung since 1996.)	广东省; Guǎngdōng Shěng	Guangzhou	126,012,510	700.02	180,013	粤 Yuè
GS	CN-GS	Gansu	甘肃省; Gānsù Shěng	Lanzhou	25,019,831	54.70	457,382	甘(陇); Gān (Lǒng)
GX	CN-GX	Guangxi	广西壮族自治区; Guǎngxī Zhuàngzú Zìzhìqū	Nanning	50,126,804	210.78	237,818	桂 Guì
GZ	CN-GZ	Guizhou	贵州省; Guìzhōu Shěng	Guiyang	38,562,148	218.93	176,140	贵(黔); Guì (Qián)
HA (HEN)	CN-HA	Henan	河南省; Hénán Shěng	Zhengzhou	99,365,519	600.52	165,467	豫 Yù
HB (HUB)	CN-HB	Hubei	湖北省; Húběi Shěng	Wuhan	57,752,557	310.87	185,776	鄂 È
HE (HEB)	CN-HE	Hebei	河北省; Héběi Shěng	Shijiazhuang	74,610,235	393.08	189,809	冀 Jì
HI	CN-HI	Hainan (Note: Most of the Hainan Province is administered by the People's Republic of China (PRC) while the Republic of China on Taiwan includes Taiping Island (Itu Aba) as part of Cijin District, Kaohsiung.)	海南省; Hǎinán Shěng	Haikou	10,081,232	294.27	34,259	琼 Qióng
HK	CN-HK (Note: Has separate ISO 3166-2 code: HK)	Hong Kong Special Administrative Region	香港特别行政区; Xiānggǎng Tèbié Xíngzhèngqū	N/A (Note: There is no official "capital" of Hong Kong, although the Central Government Complex is located in the Central and Western District, and foreign literature denoted Victoria as the capital of Hong Kong during British rule.)	7,061,200	6,396.01	1,108	港 Gǎng
HL	CN-HL	Heilongjiang	黑龙江省; Hēilóngjiāng Shěng	Harbin	31,850,088	67.37	472,766	黑 Hēi
HN (HUN)	CN-HN	Hunan	湖南省; Húnán Shěng	Changsha	66,444,864	313.65	211,842	湘 Xiāng
JL	CN-JL	Jilin	吉林省; Jílín Shěng	Changchun	24,073,453	126.51	190,282	吉 Jí
JS	CN-JS	Jiangsu	江苏省; Jiāngsū Shěng	Nanjing	84,748,016	847.91	99,949	苏 Sū
JX	CN-JX	Jiangxi	江西省; Jiāngxī Shěng	Nanchang	45,188,635	270.69	166,939	赣 Gàn
LN	CN-LN	Liaoning	辽宁省; Liáoníng Shěng	Shenyang	42,591,407	289.59	147,076	辽 Liáo
MO	CN-MO (Note: Has separate ISO 3166-2 code: MO)	Macau Special Administrative Region	澳门特别行政区; Àomén Tèbié Xíngzhèngqū	N/A (Note: There is no official capital of Macau, although the Macau Government Headquarters is located in São Lourenço Parish. During Portuguese rule, the Municipality of Macau was the capital of the Portuguese colony. After the Handover of Macau, the two municipalities (Municipality of Macau and Municipality of Ilhas) were subsequently abolished.)	552,300	19,044.82	29	澳 Ào
NM	CN-NM	Inner Mongolia	内蒙古自治区; Nèi Měnggǔ Zìzhìqū	Hohhot	24,049,155	20.05	1,199,372	蒙(绥); Měng (Suí)
NX	CN-NX	Ningxia	宁夏回族自治区; Níngxià Huízú Zìzhìqū	Yinchuan	7,202,654	108.47	66,400	宁 Níng
QH	CN-QH	Qinghai	青海省; Qīnghǎi Shěng	Xining	5,923,957	8.58	720,000	青 Qīng
SC	CN-SC	Sichuan	四川省; Sìchuān Shěng	Chengdu	83,674,866	174.93	484,056	川(蜀); Chuān (Shǔ)
SD	CN-SD	Shandong	山东省; Shāndōng Shěng	Jinan	101,527,453	643.78	157,704	鲁 Lǔ
SH	CN-SH	Shanghai Municipality	上海市; Shànghǎi Shì	Huangpu	24,870,895	3,922.24	6,341	沪(申); Hù (Shēn)
SN (SAA)	CN-SN	Shaanxi	陕西省; Shǎnxī Shěng	Xi'an	39,528,999	192.24	205,624	陕(秦); Shǎn (Qín)
SX (SAX)	CN-SX	Shanxi	山西省; Shānxī Shěng	Taiyuan	34,915,616	222.80	156,713	晋 Jìn
TJ	CN-TJ	Tianjin Municipality	天津市; Tiānjīn Shì	Hexi	13,866,009	1,194.32	11,610	津 Jīn
TW	CN-TW (Note: Has separate ISO 3166-2 code: TW)	Taiwan Province (Note: The People's Republic of China considers Taiwan to be its 23rd province, but Taiwan is currently administrated by the Republic of China. Since 1949, the ROC controls the island of Taiwan and Penghu. For Kinmen and Matsu, see note on Fujian Province. See also Political status of Taiwan.)	台湾省; Táiwān Shěng	Taipei	23,162,123	650.97	36,161	台(臺); Tái
XJ	CN-XJ	Xinjiang	新疆维吾尔自治区; Xīnjiāng Wéiwú'ěr Zìzhìqū	Ürümqi	25,852,345	15.72	1,644,707	新 Xīn
XZ	CN-XZ	Tibet	西藏自治区; Xīzàng Zìzhìqū	Lhasa	3,648,100	3.03	1,204,776	藏 Zàng
YN	CN-YN	Yunnan	云南省; Yúnnán Shěng	Kunming	47,209,277	123.20	383,195	云(滇); Yún (Diān)
ZJ	CN-ZJ	Zhejiang	浙江省; Zhèjiāng Shěng	Hangzhou	64,567,588	615.67	104,873	浙 Zhè

== See also ==
- List of Chinese provincial-level divisions by population
- List of Chinese provincial-level divisions by GDP
- List of current Chinese provincial leaders
- Tiao-kuai – Quasi-federal administration in China.

== Bibliography ==
- Guo, Rongxing (2017). How the Chinese Economy Works (4th Revised ed.). Palgrave Macmillan.
- Goodman, David S.G. (2015). Handbook of the Politics of China. Northampton, Massachusetts: Edward Elgar Publishing Limited.
- Zhang, Li; LeGates, Richard; Zhao, Min (2016). Understanding China's Urbanization: The Great Demographic, Spatial, Economic, and Social Transformation. Northampton, Massachusetts: Edward Elgar Publishing Limited.
- Saich, Tony (2015). Governance and Politics of China (Fourth ed.). New York: Palgrave Macmillan.
- Chung, Jae Ho; Lam, Chiu (2010). China's Local Administration: Traditions and Changes in the Sub-National Hierarchy. New York: Routledge.
- Fitzgerald, John (2002). Rethinking China's Provinces. New York: Routledge.
