= Macau at the 2025 World Aquatics Championships =

- Flag of Macau
- World Aquatics code: MAC
- National federation: Associação de Natação de Macau
- Website: macaunatacao.org.mo

in Singapore
- Competitors: 11 in 3 sports
- Medals: Gold 0 Silver 0 Bronze 0 Total 0

World Aquatics Championships appearances
- 1991; 1994; 1998; 2001; 2003; 2005; 2007; 2009; 2011; 2013; 2015; 2017; 2019; 2022; 2023; 2024; 2025

Macau competed at the 2025 World Aquatics Championships in Singapore from July 11 to August 3, 2025.

== Competitors ==
The following is the list of competitors in the Championships.

Sport	Men	Women	Total
Artistic swimming	0	3	3
Diving	1	3	4
Swimming	2	2	4
Total	3	8	11

== Artistic swimming ==
Women

Athlete	Event	Preliminaries		Final	
Athlete	Event	Points	Rank	Points	Rank
Shao Anlan	Solo free routine	140.6200	25	Did not advance	
Lam Cheng Tong; Leong Hoi Cheng	Duet technical routine	172.9959	37	Did not advance	
Leong Hoi Cheng; Shao Anlan	Duet free routine	155.2513	32	Did not advance	

== Diving ==
Women

Athlete	Event	Preliminaries		Semifinals		Final	
Athlete	Event	Points	Rank	Points	Rank	Points	Rank
Wong Cho Yi; Leong Ian I	3 m synchro springboard	117.27	23	Did not advance			

Mixed

Athlete	Event	Final	
Athlete	Event	Points	Rank
He Heung Wing; Zhao Hang U	3 m synchro springboard	184.62	18
He Heung Wing; Wong Cho Yi; Zhao Hang U	Team event	196.65	21

== Swimming ==
Macau entered 4 swimmers.

Men

Athlete	Event	Heat		Semi-final		Final	
Athlete	Event	Time	Rank	Time	Rank	Time	Rank
Chao Man Hou	50 m breaststroke	28.23	48	Did not advance			
Chao Man Hou	100 m breaststroke	1:02.64	46	Did not advance			
Lam Chi Chong	50 m butterfly	25.59	66	Did not advance			
Lam Chi Chong	100 m butterfly	57.50	63	Did not advance			

Women

Athlete	Event	Heat		Semi-final		Final	
Athlete	Event	Time	Rank	Time	Rank	Time	Rank
Cheang Weng Chi	50 m butterfly	29.42	61	Did not advance			
Cheang Weng Chi	100 m butterfly	1:05.42	50	Did not advance			
Chen Pui Lam	50 m breaststroke	32.27	37	Did not advance			
Chen Pui Lam	100 m breaststroke	1:11.51	45	Did not advance			

Mixed

Athlete	Event	Heat		Final	
Athlete	Event	Time	Rank	Time	Rank
Chao Man Hou; Lam Chi Chong; Cheang Weng Chi; Chen Pui Lam	4 × 100 m freestyle relay	3:47.41	26	Did not advance	
Chao Man Hou; Lam Chi Chong; Cheang Weng Chi; Chen Pui Lam	4 × 100 m medley relay	4:10.28	28	Did not advance	
