= Macau at the 2013 World Aquatics Championships =

- Flag of Macau
- World Aquatics code: MAC
- National federation: Associação de Natação de Macau

in Barcelona, Spain
- Medals: Gold 0 Silver 0 Bronze 0 Total 0

World Aquatics Championships appearances
- 1991; 1994; 1998; 2001; 2003; 2005; 2007; 2009; 2011; 2013; 2015; 2017; 2019; 2022; 2023; 2024; 2025

Macau is competing at the 2013 World Aquatics Championships in Barcelona, Spain between 19 July and 4 August 2013.

== Diving ==
Macau qualified five quota places for the following diving events.

Men

Athlete	Event	Preliminaries		Final	
Athlete	Event	Points	Rank	Points	Rank
Leong Kam Cheong; Ng Wai Hou	3 m synchronized springboard	299.70	18	did not advance	

Women

Athlete	Event	Preliminaries		Semifinals		Final	
Athlete	Event	Points	Rank	Points	Rank	Points	Rank
Lei Sio I	1 m springboard	209.10	32	—N/a		did not advance	
Lo I Teng	1 m springboard	155.40	39	—N/a		did not advance	
Lei Sio I	3 m springboard	195.90	38	did not advance			
Choi Sut Ian; Lo I Teng	3 m synchronized springboard	234.30	17	—N/a		did not advance	

== Swimming ==
Macanese swimmers achieved qualifying standards in the following events (up to a maximum of 2 swimmers in each event at the A-standard entry time, and 1 at the B-standard):

Men

Athlete	Event	Heat		Semifinal		Final	
Athlete	Event	Time	Rank	Time	Rank	Time	Rank
Lei Cheok Fong	50 m freestyle	24.55	63	did not advance			
Lei Cheok Fong	100 m freestyle	54.93	67	did not advance			
Ngou Pok Man	50 m backstroke	27.18	34	did not advance			
Ngou Pok Man	100 m backstroke	58.26	37	did not advance			

Women

Athlete	Event	Heat		Semifinal		Final	
Athlete	Event	Time	Rank	Time	Rank	Time	Rank
Kuan Weng I	50 m backstroke	31.64	44	did not advance			
Kuan Weng I	100 m backstroke	1:09.70	=44	did not advance			
Lei On Kei	50 m freestyle	26.33	40	did not advance			
Lei On Kei	50 m breaststroke	33.37	49	did not advance			

== Synchronized swimming ==
Macau has qualified twelve synchronized swimmers.

Athlete	Event	Preliminaries		Final	
Athlete	Event	Points	Rank	Points	Rank
Au Ieong Sin Ieng	Solo free routine	67.480	30	did not advance	
Au Ieong Sin Ieng	Solo technical routine	67.200	31	did not advance	
Au Ieong Sin Ieng; Lo Wai Lam	Duet free routine	65.410	34	did not advance	
Au Ieong Sin Ieng; Chang Si Wai; Cheong Ka Ieng; Gou Cheng I Kou Chin; Lau Hio Cheng*; Leong Wa Hei*; Lo Wai Lam; Lo Wai Si; Wong I Teng	Team technical routine	66.790	16	did not advance	
Au Ieong Sin Ieng; Chang Si Wai; Cheong Ka Ieng; Gou Cheng I Ho Sin; Kou Chin; Lao Teng Wai*; Lau Hio Cheng*; Leong Wa Hei; Lo Wai Lam; Lo Wai Si; Wong I Teng	Free routine combination	69.950	16	did not advance	
