= Macau at the 2015 World Aquatics Championships =

- Flag of Macau
- World Aquatics code: MAC
- National federation: Associação de Natação de Macau

in Kazan, Russia
- Competitors: 14 in 2 sports
- Medals: Gold 0 Silver 0 Bronze 0 Total 0

World Aquatics Championships appearances
- 1991; 1994; 1998; 2001; 2003; 2005; 2007; 2009; 2011; 2013; 2015; 2017; 2019; 2022; 2023; 2024; 2025

Macau competed at the 2015 World Aquatics Championships in Kazan, Russia from 24 July to 9 August 2015.

== Swimming ==
Macau swimmers have achieved qualifying standards in the following events (up to a maximum of 2 swimmers in each event at the A-standard entry time, and 1 at the B-standard):

Men

Athlete	Event	Heat		Semifinal		Final	
Athlete	Event	Time	Rank	Time	Rank	Time	Rank
Chan Man Hou	50 m breaststroke	28.99	47	did not advance			
Chan Man Hou	100 m breaststroke	1:03.46	49	did not advance			
Ngou Pok Man	50 m backstroke	27.20	=50	did not advance			
Ngou Pok Man	100 m backstroke	59.12	54	did not advance			

Women

Athlete	Event	Heat		Semifinal		Final	
Athlete	Event	Time	Rank	Time	Rank	Time	Rank
Lei On Kei	50 m breaststroke	33.94	49	did not advance			
Lei On Kei	100 m breaststroke	1:15.17	52	did not advance			
Long Chi Wai	50 m freestyle	28.02	=72	did not advance			
Long Chi Wai	100 m freestyle	1:02.01	78	did not advance			

Mixed

Athlete	Event	Heat		Final	
Athlete	Event	Time	Rank	Time	Rank
Chan Man Hou; Long Chi Wai; Ngou Pok Man; Lei On Kei	4 × 100 m freestyle relay	3:48.80	23	did not advance	
Ngou Pok Man; Lei On Kei; Chan Man Hou; Long Chi Wai	4 × 100 m medley relay	4:16.02	21	did not advance	

== Synchronized swimming ==
Macau fielded a full squad of ten synchronized swimmers to compete in each of the following events.

Athlete	Event	Preliminaries		Final	
Athlete	Event	Points	Rank	Points	Rank
Au Ieong Sin Ieng; Chang Si Wai; Gou Cheng I Kou Chin; Lei Cheok Ian; Leong Mei Hun; Li Ni*; Lo Wai Si; Wong I Teng	Team technical routine	67.9021	22	did not advance	
Au Ieong Sin Ieng; Chang Si Wai; Gou Cheng I Kou Chin; Lao Teng Wai*; Lei Cheok Ian; Leong Mei Hun; Li Ni*; Lo Wai Si; Wong I Teng	Team free routine	70.0000	20	did not advance	
Au Ieong Sin Ieng; Chang Si Wai; Gou Cheng I Kou Chin; Lao Teng Wai; Lei Cheok Ian; Leong Mei Hun; Li Ni; Lo Wai Si; Wong I Teng	Free routine combination	71.1667	16	did not advance	
