= Macau at the 2019 World Aquatics Championships =

- Flag of Macau
- World Aquatics code: MAC
- National federation: Associação de Natação de Macau

in Gwangju, South Korea
- Medals: Gold 0 Silver 0 Bronze 0 Total 0

World Aquatics Championships appearances
- 1991; 1994; 1998; 2001; 2003; 2005; 2007; 2009; 2011; 2013; 2015; 2017; 2019; 2022; 2023; 2024; 2025

Macau competed at the 2019 World Aquatics Championships in Gwangju, South Korea from 12 to 28 July.

== Artistic swimming ==
Macau entered six artistic swimmers.

Women

Athlete	Event	Preliminaries		Final	
Athlete	Event	Points	Rank	Points	Rank
Chau Cheng Han	Solo technical routine	62.3529	28	did not advance	
Zheng Zexuan	Solo free routine	66.8000	32	did not advance	
Chan Chi Ian; Chan Ka Hei	Duet technical routine	60.7235	45	did not advance	
Chio Un Tong; Chio Weng Tong	Duet free routine	63.3333	45	did not advance	

== Diving ==
Macau entered four divers.

Women

Athlete	Event	Preliminaries		Semifinals		Final	
Athlete	Event	Points	Rank	Points	Rank	Points	Rank
Choi Sut Kuan	1 m springboard	157.65	39	—N/a		did not advance	
Lei Meng Hin	3 m springboard	94.00	51	did not advance			
Choi Sut Kuan; Leong Sut Chan	3 m synchronized springboard	174.21	22	—N/a		did not advance	
Leong Sut In; Leong Sut Chan	10 m synchronized platform	192.39	14	—N/a		did not advance	

== Swimming ==
Macau entered four swimmers.

Men

Athlete	Event	Heat		Semifinal		Final	
Athlete	Event	Time	Rank	Time	Rank	Time	Rank
Chao Man Hou	50 m breaststroke	28.07	36	did not advance			
Chao Man Hou	100 m breaststroke	1:02.14	41	did not advance			
Lin Sizhuang	200 m freestyle	1:57.37	61	did not advance			
Lin Sizhuang	200 m individual medley	2:10.87	46	did not advance			

Women

Athlete	Event	Heat		Semifinal		Final	
Athlete	Event	Time	Rank	Time	Rank	Time	Rank
Cheang Weng Lam	50 m backstroke	33.01	37	did not advance			
Cheang Weng Lam	200 m breaststroke	2:46.10	31	did not advance			
Lei On Kei	50 m freestyle	26.34	40	did not advance			
Lei On Kei	100 m breaststroke	1:14.11	41	did not advance			
