= Macau at the 2023 World Aquatics Championships =

- Flag of Macau
- World Aquatics code: MAC
- National federation: Associação de Natação de Macau
- Website: macaunatacao.org.mo

in Fukuoka, Japan
- Competitors: 17 in 3 sports
- Medals: Gold 0 Silver 0 Bronze 0 Total 0

World Aquatics Championships appearances
- 1991; 1994; 1998; 2001; 2003; 2005; 2007; 2009; 2011; 2013; 2015; 2017; 2019; 2022; 2023; 2024; 2025

Macau competed at the 2023 World Aquatics Championships in Fukuoka, Japan from 14 to 30 July.

== Artistic swimming ==
Macau entered 9 artistic swimmers.

Women

Athlete	Event	Preliminaries		Final	
Athlete	Event	Points	Rank	Points	Rank
Ao Weng I Chau Cheng Han	Duet technical routine	152.1800	37	Did not advance	
Ao Weng I Chau Cheng Han	Duet free routine	94.0439	36	Did not advance	

Mixed

Athlete	Event	Preliminaries		Final	
Athlete	Event	Points	Rank	Points	Rank
Ao Weng I Au Ieong Sin Ieng; Chan Ka Hei; Chau Cheng Han; Chio Un Tong; Gabriel Zhou Constanca Sofia; Lo Wai Lam; Zheng Zexuan	Team technical routine	161.7933	21	Did not advance	
Ao Weng I Au Ieong Sin Ieng; Chan Ka Hei; Chau Cheng Han; Chio Un Tong; Gabriel Zhou Constanca Sofia; Lo Wai Lam; Zheng Zexuan	Team free routine	128.5917	19	Did not advance	

== Diving ==
Macau entered 5 divers.

Men

Athlete	Event	Preliminaries		Final	
Athlete	Event	Points	Rank	Points	Rank
He Heung Wing; Zhang Hoi	3 m synchronized springboard	200.04	27	Did not advance	
He Heung Wing; Zhang Hoi	10 m synchronized platform	215.79	18	Did not advance	

Women

Athlete	Event	Preliminaries		Final	
Athlete	Event	Points	Rank	Points	Rank
Choi Sut Kuan; Zhao Hang U	3 m synchronized springboard	181.95	18	Did not advance	
Lo Ka Wai; Zhao Hang U	10 m synchronized platform	183.87	12 Q	160.38	12

Mixed

Athlete	Event	Final	
Athlete	Event	Points	Rank
Choi Sut Kuan; He Heung Wing	3 m synchronized springboard	184.02	16
Lo Ka Wai; Zhang Hoi	10 m synchronized platform	186.15	14
Choi Sut Kuan; He Heung Wing; Lo Ka Wai; Zhang Hoi	Team event	225.75	14

== Swimming ==
Macau entered 4 swimmers.

Men

Athlete	Event	Heat		Semifinal		Final	
Athlete	Event	Time	Rank	Time	Rank	Time	Rank
Chao Man Hou	50 metre breaststroke	27.84	27	Did not advance			
Chao Man Hou	100 metre breaststroke	1:02.19	38	Did not advance			
Lin Sizhuang	200 metre freestyle	1:55.87	55	Did not advance			
Lin Sizhuang	200 metre individual medley	2:10.10	43	Did not advance			

Women

Athlete	Event	Heat		Semifinal		Final	
Athlete	Event	Time	Rank	Time	Rank	Time	Rank
Cheang Weng Lam	50 metre backstroke	32.48	52	Did not advance			
Cheang Weng Lam	100 metre backstroke	1:08.60	54	Did not advance			
Chen Pui Lam	50 metre breaststroke	32.31 NR	37	Did not advance			
Chen Pui Lam	100 metre breaststroke	1:11.11	41	Did not advance			
