= Municipal Council of Macau =

Local government structure in Macau during Portuguese rule

Coordinates: 22.1933°N 113.5394°E

Municipal Council of Macau (Portuguese: Leal Senado, lit. Loyal Senate), was the local government structure in Macau (similar to city councils) during Portuguese rule. The title Leal Senado was bestowed on Macau's government in 1810 by Portugal's prince regent João, who later became King John VI of Portugal. This was a reward for Macau's loyalty to Portugal during the Philippine Dynasty, which ruled between 1580 and 1640.

Following the 1999 handover of Macau to the People's Republic of China, the council was superseded by a Provisional Municipal Council, and finally replaced by the Municipal Affairs Bureau. Like its predecessor bodies, the present Bureau meets at the Leal Senado Building.

== Parish ==
The Council representation was based on parishes:

Nossa Senhora de Fátima 花地瑪堂區
Santo António 聖安多尼堂區 or 花王堂區
São Lázaro 望德堂區
Sé 大堂區
São Lourenço 風順堂區 or 聖老愣佐堂區
Nossa Senhora do Carmo 嘉模堂區 coterminous with the island of Taipa
Coloane 聖方濟各堂區 coterminous with the island of Coloane

== Functions ==
- urban affairs
- roads
- public transport
- fire control - Corpo de Bombeiros de Macau
- markets

== See also ==
- Legislative Council of Macau
- Executive Council of Macau
- Secretariat for Transport and Public Works (Macau)
