= Time Capsule (Macau) =

Time capsule located in Macau

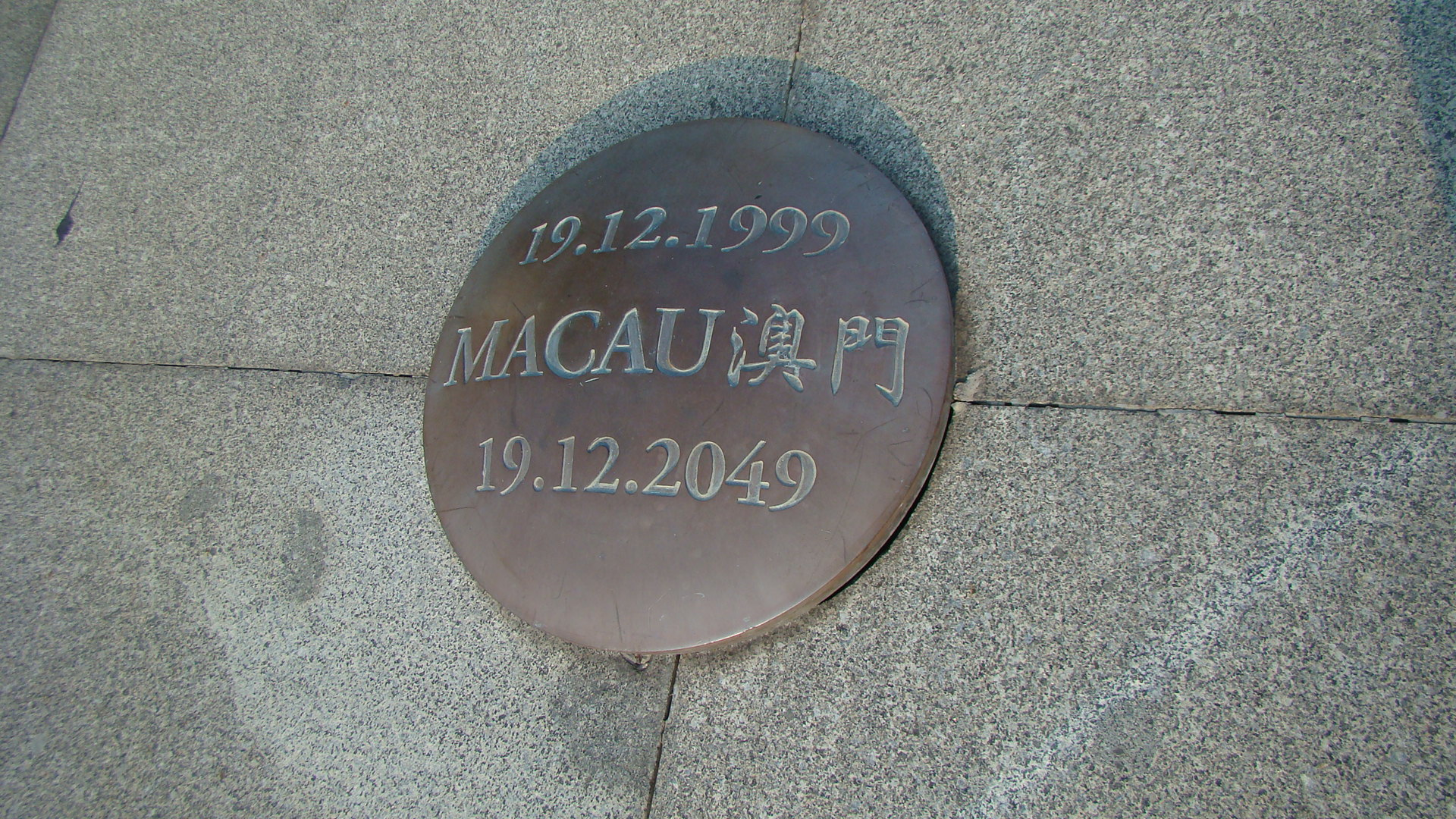
The Time Capsule for the transfer of sovereignty over Macau

Time Capsule (Portuguese: Cápsula do Tempo, Chinese: 時間囊) is a time capsule that symbolizes the Portuguese government's witnessing and acknowledgement of China's promise to maintain Macau's level of autonomy for fifty years after the transfer of sovereignty. The Time Capsule was closed and covered on 18 December 1999 and it is scheduled to be opened in 2049. Currently, the Time Capsule is located in the Praça do Centro Cultural de Macau, which was the venue for the transference of sovereignty ceremony.

== Design ==
The metallic Time Capsule, designed by Donato Moreno, is a drum-type container measuring approximately 60 centimetres (24 in) in diameter by 90 centimetres (35 in) in height. Its cover carries the inscription "19.12.1999 MACAU 澳門 19.12.2049", representing the last date on which Portugal controlled Macau (19 December 1999), the city's name in Portuguese and Chinese and the date on which the time capsule is to be opened (19 December 2049).

== History ==
President of the Portuguese Republic Jorge Sampaio with the Governor of Macau Vasco Joaquim Rocha Vieira hosted the ceremony to seal the Time Capsule in front of Pavilhão da Cerimónia de Transferênciade Poderes, the venue of the ceremony for the transfer of sovereignty over Macau at noon on 18 December 1999 (the transfer itself occurred on the 20th). At around 13:00, Sampaio and Vieira put the relevant documents with the transfer of sovereignty over Macau into the time capsule one by one. The capsule was then lowered by steel chains into the well to a depth of around 2 to 3 metres (6 ft 7 in to 9 ft 10 in) deep, buried and capped. The capsule was ceremonially sealed by Sampaio who gave a speech just before midnight on the day of the transfer.

The time capsule is expected to be opened on 19 December 2049 – 50 years from its burial, symbolizing the Central People's Government of the People's Republic of China's promise of maintaining "one country, two systems", and guaranteeing a high level of autonomy of Macau ruled by their residents for 50 years after the transfer of sovereignty to People's Republic of China, as witnessed by the Portuguese Government.

== Contents ==
The Time Capsule contains the Joint Declaration of the Government of the People's Republic of China and the Government of the Portuguese Republic on the question of Macao, Basic Law of the Macao Special Administrative Region. Moreover, documents, newspaper clippings and official press releases that related to the transfer of sovereignty during the transition period were also put into the capsule.
