= Macau at the 2024 World Aquatics Championships =

- Flag of Macau
- FINA code: MAC
- National federation: Associação de Natação de Macau
- Website: macaunatacao.org.mo

in Doha, Qatar
- Competitors: 17 in 3 sports
- Medals: Gold 0 Silver 0 Bronze 0 Total 0

World Aquatics Championships appearances
- 1991; 1994; 1998; 2001; 2003; 2005; 2007; 2009; 2011; 2013; 2015; 2017; 2019; 2022; 2023; 2024

Macau competed at the 2024 World Aquatics Championships in Doha, Qatar from 2 to 18 February.

== Competitors ==
The following is the list of competitors in the Championships.

Sport	Men	Women	Total
Artistic swimming	0	8	8
Diving	2	3	5
Swimming	2	2	4
Total	4	13	17

== Artistic swimming ==
Women

Athlete	Event	Preliminaries		Final	
Athlete	Event	Points	Rank	Points	Rank
Shao Anlan	Solo free routine	119.2521	27	Did not advance	
Ao Weng I Chau Cheng Han	Duet technical routine	178.8834	32	Did not advance	
Gabriel Zhou; Lam Cheng Tong	Duet free routine	105.5105	35	Did not advance	

Mixed

Athlete	Event	Preliminaries		Final	
Athlete	Event	Points	Rank	Points	Rank
Ao Weng I Chan Ka Hei; Chau Cheng Han; Chio Weng Tong; Gabriel Zhou; Lam Cheng Tong; Leong Hoi Cheng; Shao Anlan	Team acrobatic routine	158.0933	18	Did not advance	

== Diving ==
Men

Athlete	Event	Preliminaries		Semifinals		Final	
Athlete	Event	Points	Rank	Points	Rank	Points	Rank
He Heung Wing; Zhang Hoi	3 m synchro springboard	—				202.53	27
He Heung Wing; Zhang Hoi	10 m synchro platform	—				202.20	22

Women

Athlete	Event	Preliminaries		Semifinals		Final	
Athlete	Event	Points	Rank	Points	Rank	Points	Rank
Wong Cho Yi; Zhao Hang U	3 m synchro springboard	—				147.78	18
Lo Ka Wai; Zhao Hang U	10 m synchro platform	—				155.88	16

Mixed

Athlete	Event	Final	
Athlete	Event	Points	Rank
He Heung Wing; Zhao Hang U	3 m synchro springboard	166.17	17
Zhang Hoi; Lo Ka Wai	10 m synchro platform	180.03	9
Zhao Hang U Zhang Hoi; He Heung Wing; Lo Ka Wai	Team event	212.70	12

== Swimming ==
Macau entered 4 swimmers.

Men

Athlete	Event	Heat		Semifinal		Final	
Athlete	Event	Time	Rank	Time	Rank	Time	Rank
Chao Man Hou	50 metre breaststroke	28.13	23	Did not advance			
Chao Man Hou	100 metre breaststroke	1:03.40	45	Did not advance			
Lam Chi Chong	50 metre butterfly	25.74	45	Did not advance			
Lam Chi Chong	100 metre butterfly	57.39	52	Did not advance			

Women

Athlete	Event	Heat		Semifinal		Final	
Athlete	Event	Time	Rank	Time	Rank	Time	Rank
Cheang Weng Chi	50 metre butterfly	29.03	39	Did not advance			
Cheang Weng Chi	100 metre butterfly	1:05.11	37	Did not advance			
Chen Pui Lam	50 metre breaststroke	31.56 NR	21	Did not advance			
Chen Pui Lam	100 metre breaststroke	1:12.08	37	Did not advance			
