= Macau at the 2017 World Aquatics Championships =

- Flag of Macau
- FINA code: MAC
- National federation: Associação de Natação de Macau

in Budapest, Hungary
- Competitors: 20 in 3 sports
- Medals: Gold 0 Silver 0 Bronze 0 Total 0

World Aquatics Championships appearances
- 1991; 1994; 1998; 2001; 2003; 2005; 2007; 2009; 2011; 2013; 2015; 2017; 2019; 2022; 2023; 2024

Macau is scheduled to compete at the 2017 World Aquatics Championships in Budapest, Hungary from 14 July to 30 July.

== Diving ==
Macau has entered 4 divers (two male and two female).

| Athlete | Event | Preliminaries | | Final | |
| Athlete | Event | Points | Rank | Points | Rank |
|---|---|---|---|---|---|
| Lei Wai Ching; Leong Kam Cheong | Men's 3 m synchronized springboard | 274.17 | 21 | did not advance | |
| Choi Sut Kuan; Choi Sut Ian | Women's 3 m synchronized springboard | 241.92 | 16 | did not advance | |

== Swimming ==
Macau has received a Universality invitation from FINA to send a maximum of four swimmers (two men and two women) to the World Championships.

| Athlete | Event | Heat | | Semifinal | | Final | |
| Athlete | Event | Time | Rank | Time | Rank | Time | Rank |
|---|---|---|---|---|---|---|---|
| Chao Man Hou | Men's 100 m breaststroke | 1:02.49 | 43 | did not advance | | | |
| Chao Man Hou | Men's 200 m breaststroke | 2:15.41 | 28 | did not advance | | | |
| Lin Sizhuang | Men's 200 m freestyle | 1:55.12 | 61 | did not advance | | | |
| Lin Sizhuang | Men's 400 m freestyle | 4:08.73 | 49 | — | | did not advance | |
| Lei On Kei | Women's 50 m freestyle | 27.37 | 50 | did not advance | | | |
| Lei On Kei | Women's 100 m breaststroke | 1:14.11 | 38 | did not advance | | | |
| Tan Chi Yan | Women's 100 m freestyle | 59.38 | 55 | did not advance | | | |
| Tan Chi Yan | Women's 200 m freestyle | 2:11.61 | 44 | did not advance | | | |
| Chao Man Hou; Lei On Kei; Lin Sizhuang; Tan Chi Yan | Mixed 4 × 100 m freestyle relay | 3:43.49 | 16 | — | | did not advance | |

== Synchronized swimming ==
Macau's synchronized swimming team consisted of 12 athletes (12 female).

Women

| Athlete | Event | Preliminaries | | Final | |
| Athlete | Event | Points | Rank | Points | Rank |
|---|---|---|---|---|---|
| Au Ieong Sin Ieng; Chang Si Wai (R); Chau Cheng Hau; Choi Nok Lam (R); Kou Chin; Lei Cheok Ian; Lei Cheuk Sze; Leong Mei Hun; Li Ni; Lo Wai Lam | Team technical routine | 67.0935 | 23 | did not advance | |
| Au Ieong Sin Ieng; Chau Cheng Hau; Choi Nok Lam (R); Kou Chin; Lei Cheok Ian; Lei Cheuk Sze; Leong Mei Hun; Li Ni; Lo Wai Lam; Tong Ka Man (R) | Team free routine | 70.7333 | 23 | did not advance | |
| Au Ieong Sin Ieng; Chan Chi Ian (R); Chang Si Wai (R); Chau Cheng Hau; Choi Nok Lam; Kou Chin; Lei Cheok Ian; Lei Cheuk Sze; Leong Mei Hun; Li Ni; Lo Wai Lam; Tong Ka Man | Free routine combination | 71.0000 | 16 | did not advance | |

Legend: (R) = Reserve Athlete
