= Kırklareli University =

Public university in Kırklareli, Turkey

Coordinates: 41°43′51″N 27°13′24″E

- Established: 2007
- Rector: Prof. Dr. Mustafa Aykaç
- Students: 10000
- Location: Kırklareli, Turkey
- Website: www.klu.edu.tr

Kırklareli University is a public state university located in Kırklareli, Kırklareli Province, Turkey. It is one of the 17 new universities established under Law No. 5662, approved by then President Ahmet Necdet Sezer on 29 May 2007. The university is a member of the Balkan Universities Network.

In 2008, the university held a competition to design a new logo. The winning logo's core elements were exactly the same as those of the Emblem of the Macao Special Administrative Region, which was first published in 1992 and legally adopted in 1993 through a congressional resolution by the 8th National People's Congress of China. This plagiarism issue had been reported and criticized by the Macau media. The logo was submitted by Abdullah K., who insisted it was an original creation despite being almost identical to the Emblem of the Macau SAR. Kırklareli University decided not to pay the logo submitter the award money of 4,000 Turkish Lira (US$241.71) due to plagiarism concerns surrounding the winning logo, even though it was adopted as the official school logo in practice.

== See also ==
- List of universities in Turkey
- List of colleges and universities
- List of colleges and universities by country
