= Emblem of Macau =

Regional Emblem of Macau 澳門特別行政區區徽
- Armiger: Government of Macau
- Adopted: 1999

Regional Emblem of the Macao Special Administrative Region
- Traditional Chinese: 澳門特別行政區區徽
- Simplified Chinese: 澳门特别行政区区徽
Transcriptions
Standard Mandarin
- Hanyu Pinyin: Àomén Tèbiéxíngzhèngqū Qūhuī
Yue: Cantonese
- Yale Romanization: Oumún Dahkbiht Hàhngjingkēui Kēuifāi

The Regional Emblem of the Macao Special Administrative Region of the People's Republic of China came into use on 20 December 1999, when the sovereignty of Macau was handed over from the Portuguese Republic to the People's Republic of China. The emblem is now referred to officially as the "Regional Emblem" (區徽).

== Description ==
The regional emblem features the same design elements as the regional flag of Macau in a circular setting. The outer white ring is shown with the caption of the official name of the territory in traditional Chinese: 中華人民共和國澳門特別行政區 (Macao Special Administrative Region of the People's Republic of China) and the Portuguese short form: "Macau". In 2009, Kırklareli University in Turkey adopted an emblem similar to the Emblem of Macau. Though they were alerted to it, the University persisted in using it on the grounds there was no copyright registered in Turkey. In 2021, the Legislative Assembly of Macau passed new regulations stating where the Emblem of Macau was to be displayed. In 2026, it was noticed that a number of official government notice boards were printed with an AI altered version of the emblem, which violated the government's own emblem regulations.

== History ==
The coat of arms used by Portugal followed traditional European styles:

The first coat of arms used in Macau was used until the end of the 19th century. It features the arms of Portugal surrounded by the saying Cidade do nome de Deus, não há outra mais Leal (Portuguese for "City of the Name of God, there is none more Loyal").

In 1935, most Portuguese colonies were given coats of arms that followed a standard design pattern. It was published in the Diário do Govêrno and published in the Official Bulletin of Macau. For Macau, a dragon was used for the part of the shield featuring a design unique to each colony.

The last coat of arms of colonial Macau, used until 1999, shown here in its most simple form, was used in banknotes, coins, stamps, official documents and appears also in the façade of the "Banco Nacional Ultramarino" in Lisbon.

First coat of arms

Second coat of arms

Simple coat of arms (1935–1999)

Coat of arms (1935–1951)

Coat of arms (1951–1976)

Coat of arms (1976–1999)

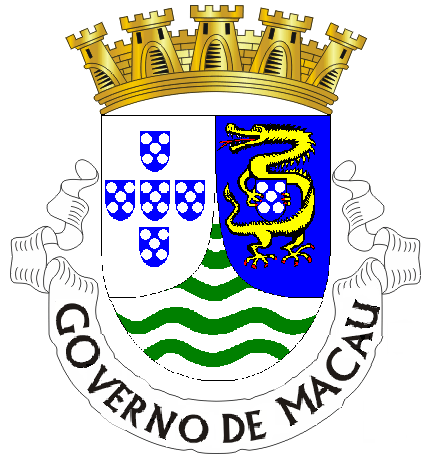
Simplified coat of arms (1976–1999)

== See also ==
- Flag of Macau
- Emblem of Hong Kong
