= Handover of Macau =

1999 handover of Macau from Portugal to China

- Part of the decolonisation of Asia
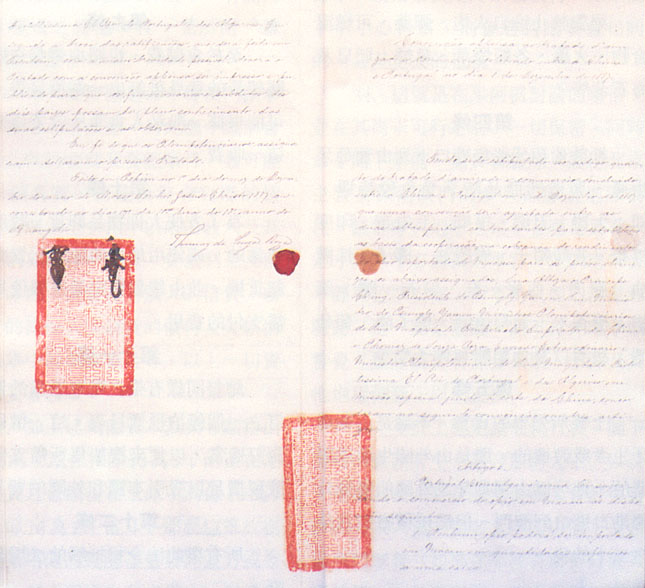
- Sino-Portuguese Lisbon Agreement, which was signed in 1887
- Native name: 澳門回歸 (Chinese); Transferência de Macau (Portuguese)
- Date: 20 December 1999; 26 years ago
- Time: 00:00 (MST, UTC+08:00)
- Location: Macau
- Also known as: Transfer of Sovereignty over Macau
- Participants: China; Jiang Zemin; Zhu Rongji; Edmund Ho; Portugal; Jorge Sampaio; António Guterres; Vasco Joaquim Rocha Vieira

Handover of Macau

Chinese name
- Traditional Chinese: 澳門回歸
- Simplified Chinese: 澳门回归
Transcriptions
Standard Mandarin
- Hanyu Pinyin: Àomén Huíguī
Yue: Cantonese
- Jyutping: ou3 mun4*2 wui4 gwai1

Portuguese name
- Portuguese: Transferência de Macau

The handover of Macau from the Portuguese Republic to the People's Republic of China (PRC) officially occurred at midnight on 20 December 1999. This event ended 442 years of Portuguese rule in the former settlement, which began in 1557.

Macau was settled by Portuguese merchants that year during the Ming dynasty era and was subsequently under various degrees of Portuguese rule until 1999. Portugal's involvement in the region was formally recognised by the Qing dynasty in 1749. The Portuguese governor João Maria Ferreira do Amaral, emboldened by British actions in the First Opium War and the Treaty of Nanking, attempted to annex the territory by expelling Qing authorities in 1846, but was assassinated in 1849. After the Second Opium War, the Portuguese government, along with a British representative, signed the 1887 Sino-Portuguese Treaty of Peking that gave Portugal perpetual colonial rights to Macau on the condition that Portugal would cooperate in efforts to end the smuggling of opium.

After the Proclamation of the People's Republic of China in 1949 and the transfer of China's seat from the Republic of China (ROC) to the PRC at the United Nations (UN) in 1971, then Chinese foreign Minister Huang Hua appealed to the UN Special Committee on Decolonization to remove Macau and Hong Kong from its list of colonies, preferring to engage in direct bilateral negotiations in getting the territories returned rather than the independence of the territories as was implied by its inclusion on the list.

On 25 April 1974, a group of left-wing Portuguese officers organised a coup d'état in Lisbon, overthrowing the right-wing Estado Novo regime that had controlled Portugal for 48 years. The new government began to transition Portugal into a liberal democracy that was committed to decolonization. The new government carried out such policies, and initially proposed Macau's handover to China at once. However, the Chinese government rejected proposals for an early handover, believing that it would impact relations with Hong Kong.

Nevertheless, on 31 December 1975, the Portuguese government had already withdrawn its remaining troops from Macau. In 1976, both Portugal and the PRC recognised Macau as a "Chinese territory under Portuguese supervision". On 8 February 1979, the Portuguese government decided to break off diplomatic relations with the Republic of China (ROC, Taiwan), and established diplomatic relations with the PRC the next day. The colony remained under de jure Portuguese rule until 20 December 1999, when its handover to China took place and became the Macau Special Administrative Region (SAR) of the PRC. The handover marked the end of almost six centuries of the Portuguese Empire since 1415.

== Negotiations ==
On 20 May 1986, the People's Republic of China, along with Portugal, officially announced that talks on Macanese affairs would take place in Beijing on 30 June 1986. The Portuguese delegation arrived in Beijing in June, and was welcomed by the Chinese delegation led by Zhou Nan.

The talks consisted of four sessions, all held in Beijing:

- The first conference: 30 June – 1 July 1986
- The second conference: 9–10 September 1986
- The third conference: 21–22 October 1986
- The fourth conference: 18–23 March 1987

During the negotiations, Portuguese representatives again offered to return Macau in 1987, but Chinese representatives rejected that year (as well rejecting previous requests in 1967, 1975, and 1977). China requested 1997, the same year as Hong Kong, but Portugal refused. 2004 was suggested by Portugal, as well as 2007 as that year would mark the 450th anniversary of Portugal renting Macau. However, China insisted for a year before 2000 as the Sino-British Joint Liaison Group in Hong Kong would be dissolved in 2000 as envisioned in 1986 (the Joint Liaison Group would ultimately be dissolved in 1999). Eventually, the year 1999 was agreed upon.

On 13 April 1987, the Sino-Portuguese Joint Declaration by the governments of the People's Republic of China and the Portuguese Republic was formally signed by the Prime Ministers of both governments in Beijing.

== Transition period (1987–1999) ==
The twelve years between the signing of the "Sino-Portuguese Declaration" on 13 April 1987 and the handover on 20 December 1999 were known as "the transition".

On 15 January 1988, the Chinese Foreign Affairs Department announced the Chinese members of the groups that would begin the talk on the issues of Macau during the transition. On 13 April, the "Draft of the Basic Law of the Macau Special Administrative Region Committee" was established during the seventh National People's Congress, and on 25 October, the committee convened the first conference, in which they passed the general outline of the draft and the steps, and decided to organise the "Draft of the Basic Law of Macau Special Administrative Region Information Committee". On 31 March 1993, the National People's Congress passed the resolution on the Basic Law of Macau, which marked the beginning of the latter part of the transition.

== Handover events ==
The last issue of the Official Bulletin of Portuguese Macau, with farewell messages from the president, speaker, prime minister, and Governor of Macau

The first issue of the government gazette of Macau under Chinese rule, issued on the following day

The official handover was held at midnight on that day at the Macao Cultural Centre Garden purpose-built Temporary Pavilion. It was designed by Vicente Bravo Ferreira and constructed with a cost of MOP$60 million, measuring 20 metres (66 ft) high and covering an area of 6,000 square metres (65,000 sq ft). The ceremony began in the evening and ended at dawn of 20 December. At the same time, an all-night official celebration gala was held at Beijing's Tiananmen Square to mark this occasion.

=== Stage design ===
Like the stage and chairs and podia of the Hong Kong handover ceremony two years before, the big green stage and chairs and podia in the pavilion were designed by renowned American professional stage designer, Donato Moreno. The left podium was attached with the national emblem of China, while the right podium was attached with the lesser Coat of arms of Portugal (without the laurel, like the one on the Portuguese national flag). Both podia were located at stage centre in front of the chairs of the main representatives (5 for each country) and beside the flagpoles (2 for each country, taller ones for the sovereign state and the shorter ones for the territorial flag of Macau, correspond to the sovereign state it is under at the time during the ceremony). Unlike Hong Kong, Macau did not have a colonial flag, so the flag of the Municipality of Macau was used to represent Portuguese Macau at the ceremony. This flag was also used to represent Macau at international sporting events prior to the handover.

=== Representatives ===
Representatives at the handover ceremony included:

For the People's Republic of China

- Jiang Zemin, General Secretary of the Chinese Communist Party and President of China
- Zhu Rongji, Premier of China
- Qian Qichen, 3rd Vice Premier of China
- Tang Jiaxuan, Minister of Foreign Affairs
- Edmund Ho, Chief Executive of Macau

(Portugal) For the Portuguese Republic

- Jorge Sampaio, President of Portugal
- António Guterres, Prime Minister of Portugal
- Jaime Gama, Minister of State and Minister of Foreign Affairs
- Narana Coissoró, Vice President of the Assembly of the Republic
- Vasco Joaquim Rocha Vieira, Governor of Macau

Other representatives at the ceremony included:

- Martti Ahtisaari, President of Finland
- (Republic of Ireland) David Andrews, Minister for Foreign Affairs of Ireland
- (United Nations) Xanana Gusmão, East Timor Resistance Leader
- (European Union) Chris Patten, European Commissioner for External Relations (also former Governor of Hong Kong)

and representatives from more than 50 other countries and dozens of international organisations.

=== Sunday, 19 December 1999 ===
Flag of the Municipality of Macau as seen during the handover ceremony.

Flag of the newly established Macau Special Administrative Region.

- (12:05 Macau Time/4:05 Lisbon Time) – President Jiang Zemin and Premier Zhu Rongji arrived in Macau by Air China Boeing 747 from Beijing.
- (16:30 Macau Time/8:30 Lisbon Time) – Governor Vasco Joaquim Rocha Vieira departed from his residence at Santa Sancha Palace for his office at Praia Grande Palace.
- (17:00 Macau Time/9:00 Lisbon Time) – Lowering of the national flag of Portugal at Praia Grande Palace, during which the Governor receives the flag.
- (18:00 Macau Time/10:00 Lisbon Time) – The cultural event began with dragon and lion dances. These were followed by a slideshow of historical events and features of Macau, which included a mixture of the religions and races of the East and the West, and the unique society of native Portuguese born in Macau. In the final performance, 442 children who represented the 442 years of Portuguese history in Macau were presented along with several international stars to perform the song "Praise for Peace".
- (19:50 Macau Time/11:50 Lisbon Time) – A cocktail reception was held, but due to strong winds, the waterfront firework display could not be held as planned.
- (21:00 Macau Time/13:00 Lisbon Time) – Official pre-ceremony banquet.
- (23:45 Macau Time/15:45 Lisbon Time) – Handover Ceremony officially begins. Portuguese President Jorge Sampaio reads the farewell speech, vowing solidarity with Macau.
- (23:58:30–23:59:40 Macau Time/15:58:30–15:59:40 Lisbon Time) – The Flag of Portugal and the Flag of the Municipality of Macau were slowly lowered to the Portuguese national anthem A Portuguesa, symbolising the end of Portuguese colonial rule in Macau.

=== Monday, 20 December 1999 ===
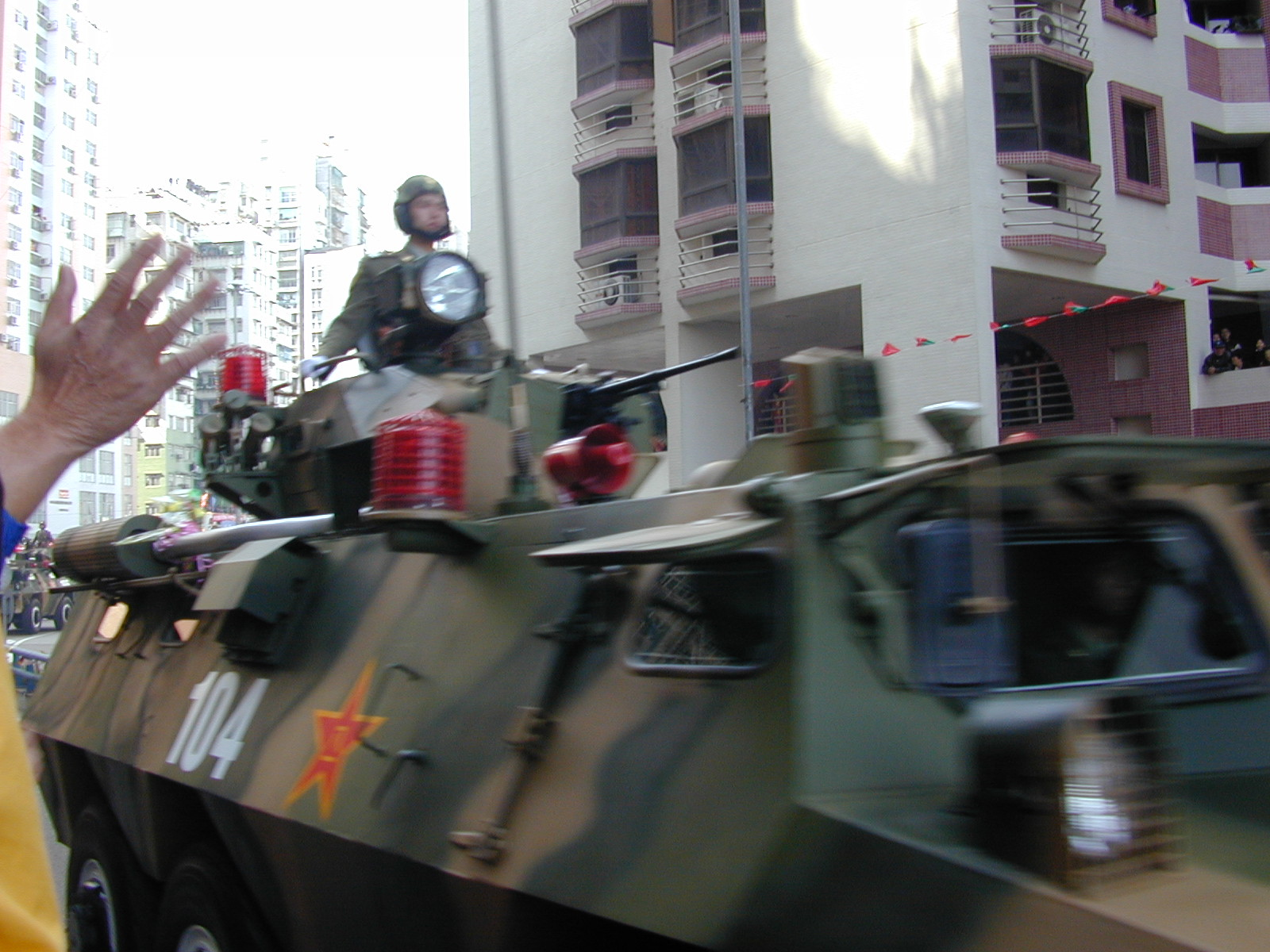
People's Liberation Army troops entering Macau midday on 20 December 1999.

- (00:00:00 Macau Time (same as Beijing Time)) – Sovereignty of Macau is officially transferred from Portuguese Republic to the People's Republic of China. The Flag of the People's Republic of China and the Macau regional flag were simultaneously raised to the Chinese national anthem "March of the Volunteers", to officially mark the beginning of the Chinese rule in Macau. Chinese leader Jiang Zemin gave a speech expressing his optimism for the "one country, two systems" implementation as the answer for Taiwan's eventual reunification. Grand celebrations begin in the mainland with fireworks displays over Tiananmen Square.
- (00:15 Macau/Beijing Time) – President Jorge Sampaio, Prime Minister Antonio Guterres and other Portuguese officials flew out by an Air Macau Airbus A320 from Macau International Airport to Bangkok's Don Mueang International Airport. President Sampaio was scheduled to start his two-day visit to Thailand before heading to East Timor. But due to pneumonia, he shortened his stay in the Thai capital, postponed his East Timor trip and went back to Lisbon, Portugal the next day.
- (01:30 Macau/Beijing Time) – A swearing-in ceremony was held at the Macao Cultural Centre for various MSAR officials including Chief Executive Edmund Ho, Secretary for Administration and Justice Florinda Chan and Secretary for Economy and Finance Francis Tam.
- (10:00 Macau/Beijing Time) – The new Macau government hosted a celebration for 3,000 guests. Newly appointed Chief Executive Edmund Ho makes his inaugural speech.
- (12:00 Macau/Beijing Time) – People's Liberation Army troops from the Macau Garrison arrive by land.
- (13:00 Macau/Beijing Time) – Parade of various Macau-based organisations and institutions.

== Aftermath ==
After the handover of Macau to China, the Macau Special Administrative Region, the Legislative Assembly and the Judiciary were all put into practice accordingly under the regulation of the Basic Law.

The introduction of the Individual Visit Scheme policy made it easier for mainland Chinese residents to travel back and forth. In 2005 alone, there were more than 10 million tourists from mainland China, which made up 60% of the total number of tourists in Macau. The income from the gambling houses in Macau reached almost US$5.6 billion. On 15 July 2005, the Historic Centre of Macau was listed as a World Cultural Heritage site. The increasing development of tourism became a major factor in the rapid development of the economy of Macau.

For Portugal, the handover of Macau to China marked the end of the Portuguese Empire and its decolonisation process and also the end of European imperialism in China and Asia.

== Before and after handover ==
Unchanged after 20 December 1999	Changed after 20 December 1999
1. Portuguese remains an official language. Public signs are bilingual in Portuguese and Traditional Chinese, although signs may also include English. However, many schools teach in Cantonese in parallel with Mandarin and Portuguese.; 2. The legal system remains separate from that of mainland China, broadly based on the Portuguese civil system, with some Portuguese judges continuing to serve.; 3. Macau retained the pataca as its currency, which remained the responsibility of the Monetary Authority of Macau, and pegged to the Hong Kong dollar. However, the Bank of China began issuing banknotes in 1995.; 4. The border with the mainland, while now known as the boundary, continues to be patrolled as before, with separate immigration and customs controls.; 5. Citizens of Macau are still required to apply for a Mainland Travel Permit, in order to visit mainland China.; 6. Citizens of mainland China do not have the right of abode in Macau, except if they were born in Macau (before or after the establishment of the SAR). Instead, they have to apply for a permit to visit or settle in Macau from the PRC government.; 7. Macau continues to operate as a separate customs territory from mainland China.; 8. Macau remains an individual member of various international organisations, such as APEC and WTO.; 9. Macau continues to negotiate and maintain its own aviation bilateral treaties with foreign countries and territories. These include flights to Taiwan.; 10. Macau remains an individual member of sporting organizations such as FIFA. However, the Sports and Olympic Committee of Macau, China, while a member of the Olympic Council of Asia, is not a member of the International Olympic Committee.; 11. Macau citizens continue to have easier access to many countries, including those in Europe and North America, with Macau SAR passport holders having visa-free access to 117 other countries and territories.; 12. Foreign nationals, including Portuguese citizens, are allowed to hold high-level positions in the administration, except the office of Chief Executive; those who will apply for Chief Executive position will have to be naturalized as Chinese. This was in contrast to Hong Kong, where such positions were restricted to citizens of the SAR.; 13. Members of the existing Legislative Assembly, who had been elected in 1996, remained in office until 2001, although those who had been appointed by the Governor were replaced by those appointed by the incoming Chief Executive.; 14. Foreign nationals, including Portuguese citizens, are still allowed to stand for directly elected seats in the Legislative Assembly. This is in contrast to Hong Kong, where foreign nationals can only stand for indirectly elected seats in the Legislative Council.; 15. Macau continues to have more political freedoms than mainland China, with the holding of demonstrations and annual memorials to commemorate the Tiananmen Square protests of 1989 in Senado Square. However, pro-democracy politicians and academics from Hong Kong were refused entry.; 16. Macau continues to have more freedom of the press than mainland China despite the growing influence of Beijing and Hong Kong journalists being refused entry.; 17. Macau continues to have its own civic groups participating in the political system. These are separate from the Communist-led United Front on the mainland.; 18. Macau also continues to have more religious freedoms, with the Roman Catholic Diocese of Macau remaining under the jurisdiction of the Holy See, instead of the Chinese Patriotic Catholic Association on the mainland. However, the Falun Gong spiritual practice has faced restrictions.; 19. Macau continues to drive on the left unlike mainland China, all of which has driven on the right since 1946, or Portugal and most other Portuguese colonies, which switched to the right in 1928. Vehicle registration plates continued to follow the old Portuguese format, with white characters on a black plate. This had been discontinued in Portugal in 1992.; 20. Macau-registered vehicles can travel to and from mainland China, but require special cross-border plates, similar to those of Guangdong.; 21. Macau retains a separate international dialling code (853) and telephone numbering plan from that of the mainland. Calls between Macau and the mainland still require international dialling.; 22. Macau retains different technical standards from mainland China, such as British-style electrical plugs. However, Macau would later adopt the digital TV standard devised in mainland China, instead of DVB-T, replacing PAL-I for TV transmissions.; 23. Macau retains a separate ISO 3166 code, MO. It also retains a top-level domain, .mo. However, the Chinese code CN-92 was also used.; 24. Macau retains its own separate postal services, with Correios de Macau operating separately from China Post. Macau was not made part of the Chinese postcode system, nor did it introduce a postcode system of its own.; 25. Portuguese-influenced place names remain unchanged, although their unrelated Chinese equivalents are already in use; for example, Avenida Almeida Ribeiro is known as San Ma Lou or "new road".; 26. Portuguese monuments remain, although the statue of former Governor João Maria Ferreira do Amaral was taken down in 1992. The statue is now located at the Bairro da Encarnação, Lisbon, Portugal, where it was placed in December 1999.; 27. The former Portuguese military drill, marching and words of command in Portuguese remain in service among disciplinary forces, in contrast to Hong Kong where Chinese foot drills were adopted in 2022.; 28. The floor on the ground level continues to be officially referred to by the Portuguese abbreviation R/C (rés-do-chão).; 29. Macau retained its own flag carrier airline Air Macau.	1. The Chief Executive of Macau became the head of government, elected by a selection committee with 300 members, who mainly are elected from among professional sectors and business leaders in Macau. The Governor was appointed by Portugal.; 2. The former Governor's Palace is now known as the Government Headquarters.; 3. The Court of Final Appeal became the highest court of appeal in Macau. This replaced the Superior Court of Justice, established in April 1993. Appeals to the Court of Appeal of the Judiciary District of Lisbon ceased in 1999.; 4. All public offices now fly the flags of the PRC and the Macau SAR. The Flag of Portugal now flies only outside the Portuguese Consulate-General and other Portuguese premises.; 5. The People's Liberation Army established a garrison in Macau, the first military presence there since the Portuguese military garrison had been withdrawn following the Carnation Revolution in 1974.; 6. The Central People's Government is now formally represented in Macau by a Liaison Office. This has been established in 1987 as a branch of Xinhua News Agency, when Macau was under Portuguese administration. Before 1987, it was informally represented by the Nanguang trading company.; 7. The Macau SAR Government is now formally represented in Beijing by the Office of the Government of the Macau Special Administrative Region.; 8. Elsewhere, the Macau SAR Government is now represented by Macau Economic and Trade Offices in Lisbon (Portugal), Brussels (European Union), Geneva (World Trade Organization) and Taipei (Taiwan).; 9. The Ministry of Foreign Affairs of the People's Republic of China is represented in Macau by a Commissioner.; 10. The Municipalities of Macau and the Ilhas, which had been retained provisionally following the handover, were abolished and replaced by the Civic and Municipal Affairs Bureau with effect from 1 January 2002.; 11. Portugal was now represented in Macau by the Portuguese Consulate-General, also accredited to Hong Kong. This had responsibility for matters relating to Portuguese nationals. However, residents of Macau born after 3 October 1981 were no longer entitled to Portuguese nationality.; 12. The Taipei Trade and Tourism Office, the de facto mission of Taiwan, was renamed the Taipei Trade and Cultural Office, and was allowed to issue visas in 2002. It was later renamed the Taipei Economic and Cultural Office in Macau in 2011.; 13. The words "República Portuguesa" no longer appear on postage stamps, which now display the words "Macau, China". The Portuguese coat of arms had already been removed from Macanese pataca banknotes and coins issued since 1988.; 14. The Macau Police badge now displays the Macau SAR emblem.; 15. The Portuguese honours system was replaced by a local system, with the Grand Medal of Lotus Flower as the highest award.; 16. Public holidays changed, with Macau SAR Establishment Day being introduced and Portuguese-inspired occasions, such as Republic Day and Freedom Day, being abolished. PRC National Day had been made a public holiday in 1981.; 17. Macau's aircraft registration prefix changed from Portugal's CS to B, as used by mainland China, Taiwan and Hong Kong.; 18. The Portuguese national anthem A Portuguesa, is no longer played after closedown on television stations. The Chinese national anthem, March of the Volunteers, is now played instead.; 19. A giant golden statue of a lotus, erected in a public space outside the Macau Forum named Lotus Square, was presented by the State Council of the People's Republic of China to commemorate the return of Macau to Chinese sovereignty.; 20. The University of Macau was relocated to a new campus on Hengqin Island in 2009. This was under the jurisdiction of the Macau SAR government, which had leased a plot of land for MOP$1.2 billion until 2049.

== See also ==
- Handover of Hong Kong
- One country, two systems
- Handover Gifts Museum of Macao
- Time Capsule (Macau)
