= Municipalities and parishes of Macau =

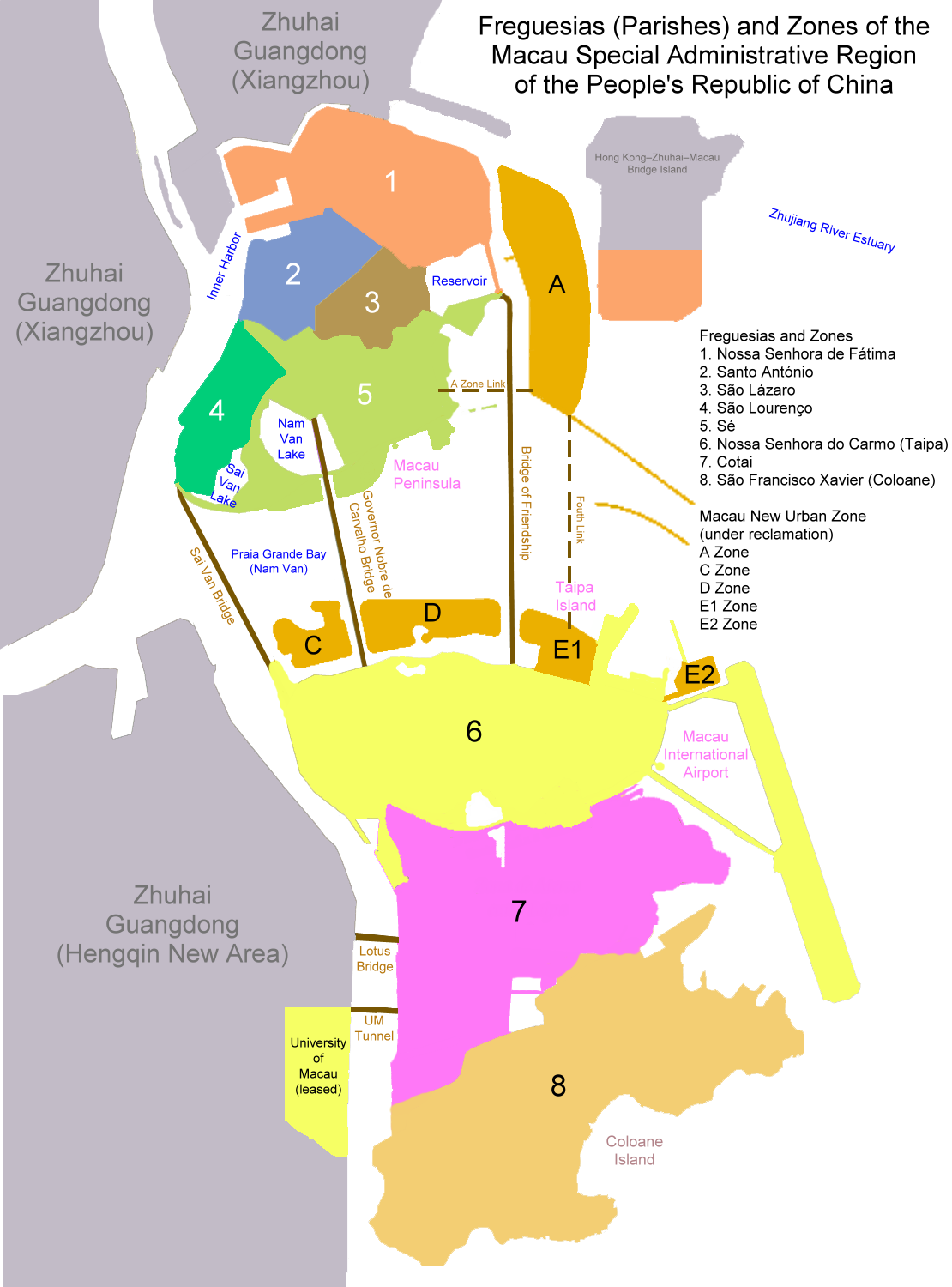
Civil parishes of Macau (in English)

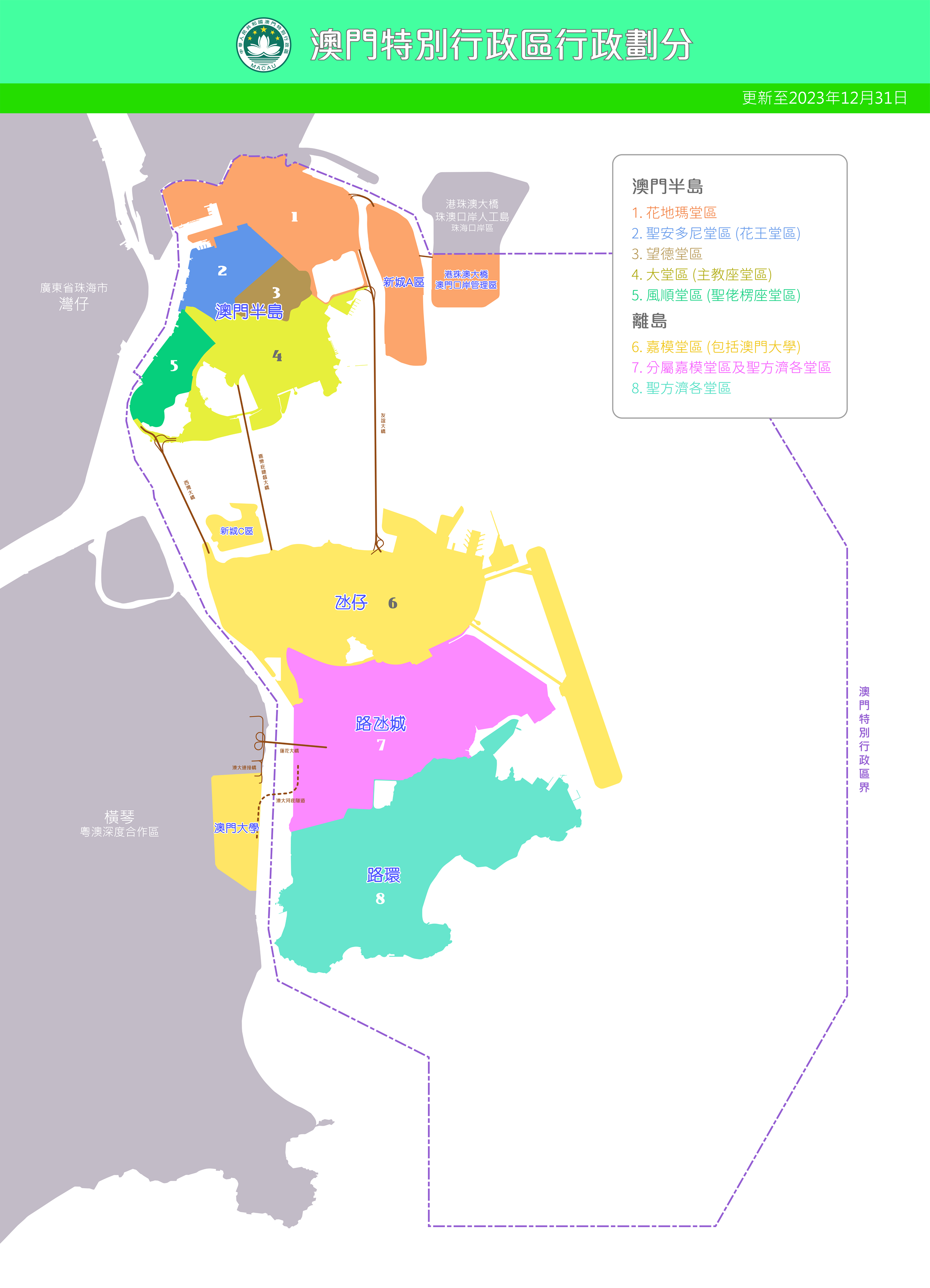
Civil parishes of Macau (in Chinese)

By the end of Portuguese rule, Macau was administratively divided into two municipalities: Macau and Ilhas, and seven civil parishes (freguesias). Parishes were administrative subdivisions of the municipalities.

After the 1999 transfer of sovereignty over Macau from Portugal to China, municipalities were formally abolished on 31 December 2001 by Law No. 17/2001. Since the abolition of the municipalities, parishes are still officially recognized divisions but for symbolic reasons only, while some of the municipal services are now handled by the Municipal Affairs Bureau.

== Parishes ==
Prior to the dissolution of the municipalities in 2001, the first five parishes listed in the table below fell under the Municipality of Macau while the remaining two fell under the Municipality of Ilhas, totalling to seven parishes. The parishes of Nossa Senhora do Carmo and São Francisco Xavier are coterminous with the natural borders of the islands of Taipa and Coloane, respectively.

Parish / Area	Chinese	Area (km^{2})
Parish
Nossa Senhora de Fátima	花地瑪堂區	3.2
Santo António	花王堂區	1.1
São Lázaro	望德堂區	0.6
Sé	大堂區	3.4
São Lourenço	風順堂區	1.0
Nossa Senhora do Carmo (Taipa)	嘉模堂區	7.9
São Francisco Xavier (Coloane)	聖方濟各堂區	7.6
Other area
Cotai	路氹	6.1
Novos Aterros Urbanos de Macau Zone A	新城A區	1.4
Zona de Administração de Macau na Ilha Fronteiriça Artificial da Ponte Hong Kong–Zhuhai–Macau (the southern part of the reclaimed island at the western end of the Hong Kong–Zhuhai–Macau Bridge)	港珠澳大橋珠澳口岸	0.7
Novos Aterros Urbanos de Macau Zone C	新城C區	0.3
Universidade de Macau (Ilha de Montanha (Hengqin) campus)	澳門大學 (橫琴校區)	1.0
Total land area		34.3
Territorial waters		85
Total Macau SAR		119.3

=== Former municipalities ===
Each municipality was run by a municipal chamber (câmara municipal), with a supervising municipal assembly (assembleia municipal).

Municipality of Macau; Concelho de Macau 澳門市	Coterminous with the Macau Peninsula. Its seat was also known as Cidade do (Santo) Nome de Deus de Macau (= City of the (Holy) Name of God of Macau, full motto: Cidade do (Santo) Nome de Deus de Macau, Não Há Outra Mais Leal, lit. City of the (Holy) Name of God of Macau, None Is More Loyal)
Municipality of Ilhas; Concelho das Ilhas 海島市	Coterminous with the islands of Taipa and Coloane.

== See also ==
- Geography of Macau
