= Municipality of Macau =

Municipality of the Macau SAR

Coordinates: 22°11′36″N 113°32′22″E

Municipality of Macau Concelho de Macau
- Prefecture
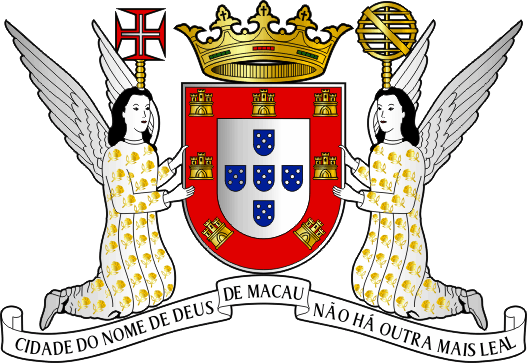
- Flag Coat of arms

- Macau Peninsula

Chinese name
- Traditional Chinese: 澳門市
- Simplified Chinese: 澳门市
- Cantonese Yale: ou mùhn síh
- Jyutping: Ou3 Mun4 Si5
Transcriptions
Standard Mandarin
- Hanyu Pinyin: Àoménshì
Yue: Cantonese
- Yale Romanization: ou mùhn síh
- Jyutping: Ou3 Mun4 Si5

The Municipality of Macau (Portuguese: Concelho de Macau) was one of the two municipalities (concelhos) of Macau, along with the Municipality of Ilhas.

Its organs, the Municipal Council of Macau (Câmara Municipal de Macau) and the Municipal Assembly of Macau (Assembleia Municipal de Macau), had been abolished. The law provided for their dissolution (dissolução) became effective on 31 December 2001. The law also provided for the "extinction" (extinção) of the provisional municipalities (municípios provisórios) but had not mentioned anything about the concelhos.

== History ==
In 1513, Portuguese explorer Jorge Álvares arrived in the Pearl River Delta, in the Shenzhen area, which he called Tamão. A Portuguese settlement was started there. By 1535 traders were allowed to anchor their ships in the harbour. In 1887, the Sino-Portuguese Treaty of Peking was signed, allowing "the perpetual occupation and government of Macau by Portugal".

According to National Geographic, "Macau may never have existed if not for Tamão" where the Portuguese learned "how China, the Pearl River Delta, and the South China Sea worked". The settlement and Jorge Álvares "kickstarted a chain of events that ultimately spawned Macau". A large stone sculpture of Álvares stands in downtown Macau.

== Former municipal organs ==
Following the handover of Macau to China on 20 December 1999, the municipal organs were renamed as Provisional Municipal Council of Macau (Câmara Municipal de Macau Provisória) and the Provisional Municipal Assembly of Macau (Assembleia Municipal de Macau Provisória).

The institutions were abolished on 31 December 2001 and replaced by the Civic and Municipal Affairs Bureau the following day.

== Divisions of departments ==
Despite the extinção of the municípios provisórios and the dissolution of the municipal councils and assemblies in 2001, certain government departments have maintained divisions for the area of the concelho, e.g., the Departamento Policial de Macau (DPM, lit. 'Police Department of Macau'; which exists alongside the Departamento Policial das Ilhas).

== Freguesias ==
Freguesia / Parish	2013 Area (km^{2})	2013 Population	Density (/km^{2})
Nossa Senhora de Fátima (花地瑪)	3.2	237,500	74,218
Santo António (花王 / 聖安多尼)	1.1	129,800	118,000
São Lázaro (望德)	0.6	33,100	55,166
Sé (大)	3.4	52,200	15,352
São Lourenço (風順 / 聖老愣佐)	1.0	51,700	51,700

== Demographics ==
The population of the Macau Peninsula has been increasing rapidly for decades, particularly since the transfer of sovereignty to the People's Republic of China. With 45,675 inhabitants/km^{2}, Macau has one of the highest population densities of any urban area.

Population
1981	238,413
1991	342,548
1996	390,928
2001	388,647
2006	433,730
2011	469,009
2016	520,166
2017	520,700

== See also ==
- Municipality of Ilhas
