= Municipal Affairs Bureau =

Administrative body of Macau

- Instituto para os Assuntos Municipais 市政署
- Logo of the Municipal Affairs Bureau

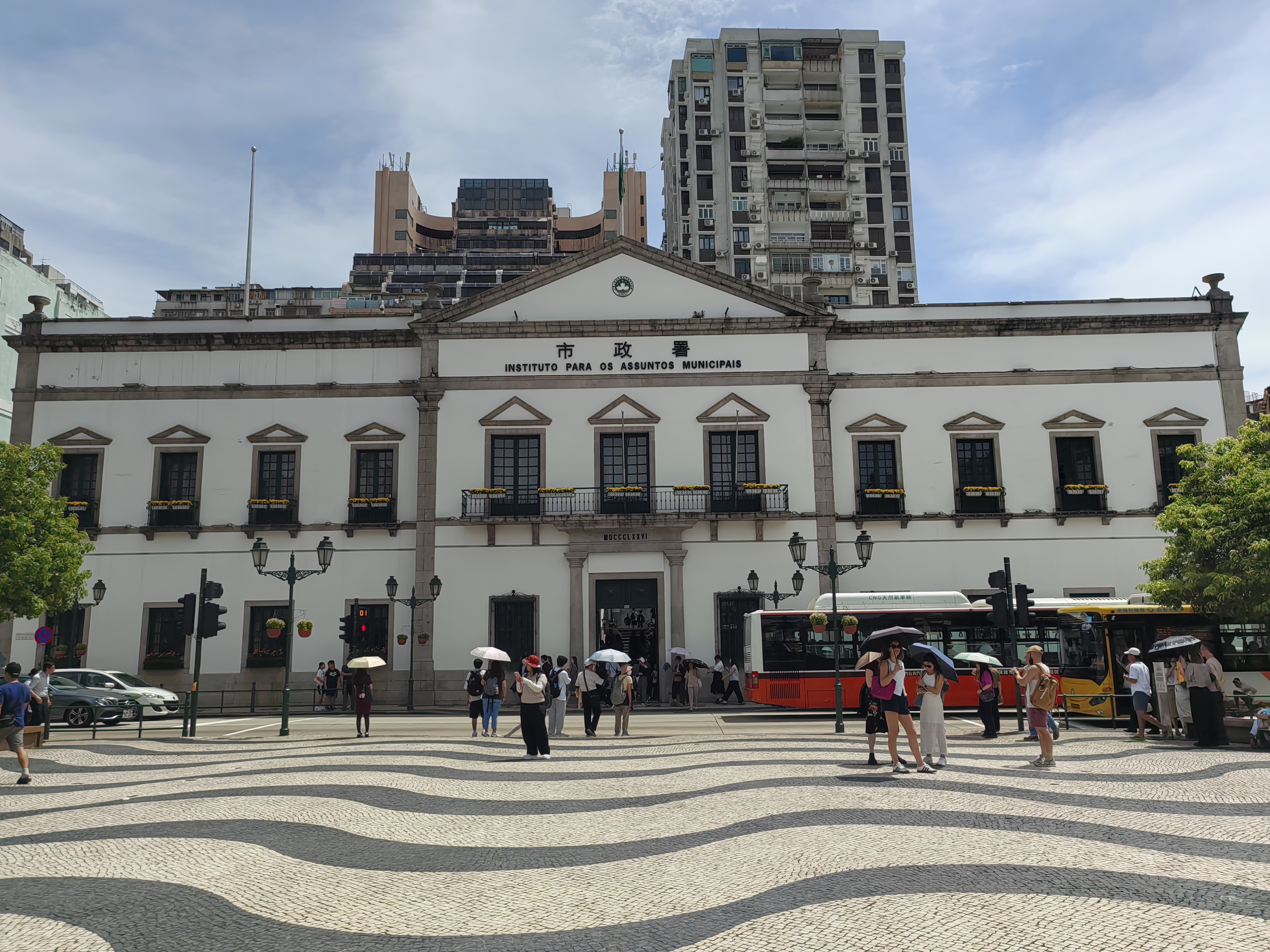

Agency overview
- Formed: 1 January 2019
- Preceding agency: Civic and Municipal Affairs Bureau
- Jurisdiction: Government of Macau
- Headquarters: Avenida Almeida Ribeiro, n.º 163, Macau
- Website: IAM.gov.mo

Municipal Affairs Bureau

Chinese name
- Chinese: 市政署
Transcriptions
Yue: Cantonese
- Jyutping: si5 zing3 cyu5

Portuguese name
- Portuguese: Instituto para os Assuntos Municipais

The Municipal Affairs Bureau (Chinese: 市政署; Portuguese: Instituto para os Assuntos Municipais) (IAM) of Macau is an administrative body without political powers responsible for providing certain civic services for the special administrative region and is the successor to the Civic and Municipal Affairs Bureau (民政總署, Instituto para os Assuntos Cívicos e Municipais, IACM) which was abolished in 2019. The latter was formed to handle the functions of the former municipalities of Macau and their councils and assemblies that were abolished on 1 January 2002, slightly more than two years after Macau became a special administrative region (SAR) of the People's Republic of China. The body is under the Secretariat for Administration and Justice of the Macau government.

== History ==
Following the transfer of sovereignty over Macau from Portugal to China in 1999, the Portuguese administrative divisions of municipalities and parishes (Note: In Portuguese: concelhos and freguesias) in Macau were kept provisionally in place: the provisional municipal council of Macau, the provisional municipal council of Ilhas, and the provisional municipal assemblies of each municipality.

On 31 December 2001, all the provisional organs were dissolved and the new Civic and Municipal Affairs Bureau took on the roles of the provisional municipal councils, starting from 1 January 2002, under the Secretariat for Administration and Justice of the Macau government.

The IACM was given a logo based on the Chinese Han character 民, for "civilian".

In 2018, the Macau legislative assembly passed Law No. 9/2018 which abolished the IACM and created the Municipal Affairs Bureau in its place. All the functions of the former were transferred to the new bureau and a new 25-member municipal affairs advisory council was established. This came into effect on 1 January 2019.

== See also ==
- Leal Senado Building
- Municipalities and parishes of Macau
