= Municipality of Ilhas =

Municipality of the Macau SAR

Coordinates: 22°9′35″N 113°33′34″E

Municipality of Ilhas Concelho das Ilhas
- Prefecture
- Flag Coat of arms

- Taipa and Coloane
- Dissolved: 31 December 2001

Municipality of Ilhas
- Traditional Chinese: 海島市
- Simplified Chinese: 海岛市
- Cantonese Yale: hói dóu síh
- Jyutping: Hoi2 Dou2 Si5
Transcriptions
Standard Mandarin
- Hanyu Pinyin: Hǎidǎoshì
Yue: Cantonese
- Yale Romanization: hói dóu síh
- Jyutping: Hoi2 Dou2 Si5

The Municipality of Ilhas (Portuguese: Concelho das Ilhas, lit. 'Municipality of the Islands') was one of the two municipalities (concelhos) of Macau, along with the Municipality of Macau.

Its organs, the Municipal Council of Ilhas (Câmara Municipal das Ilhas) and the Municipal Assembly of Ilhas (Assembleia Municipal das Ilhas), had been abolished. The law provided for their dissolution (dissolução) became effective on 31 December 2001. The law also provided for the "extinction" (extinção) of the provisional municipalities (municípios provisórios) but had not mentioned anything about the concelhos.

== Former municipal organs ==
Following the handover of Macau to China on 20 December 1999, they were renamed as Provisional Municipal Council of Ilhas (Câmara Municipal das Ilhas Provisória) and the Provisional Municipal Assembly of Ilhas (Assembleia Municipal das Ilhas Provisória).

The institutions were abolished on 31 December 2001 and replaced by the Civic and Municipal Affairs Bureau the following day.

== Divisions of departments ==
Despite the extinção of the municípios provisórios and the dissolution of the municipal councils and assemblies in 2001, certain government departments have maintained divisions for "das Ilhas" (the Islands), e.g., the Departamento Policial das Ilhas (DPI, lit. 'Police Department of the Islands'; which exists alongside the Departamento Policial de Macau).

Below is a non-exhaustive list of government organisations for das Ilhas:

- Centro de Serviços da RAEM das Ilhas
- O Complexo de Cuidados de Saúde das Ilhas
- Posto de Urgência das Ilhas
- Cartório Notarial das Ilhas
- Centro de Tratamento de Achados e Perdidos das Ilhas
- Centro de Prestação de Serviços ao Público das Ilhas

== Organisations ==
Organisations based in das Ilhas:

- Associação de Auxílio Mútuo das Ilhas
- Federação Industrial e Comercial das Ilhas de Macau
- Associação dos Habitantes das Ilhas Kuan Iek de Macau

== Freguesias ==
Freguesia (Parish) and Zone	2013 Area (km^{2})	2013 Area (mi^{2})	2013 Population	Density (/km^{2})	Density (/mi^{2})
Freguesia de Nossa Senhora do Carmo 嘉模堂區	7.6	2.9	92,200	12,131	31,793
Freguesia de São Francisco Xavier 聖方濟各堂區	7.6	2.9	9,300	1,224	3,207

== See also ==
- Municipality of Macau
