= Flag of Macau =

Macao Special Administrative Region of the People's Republic of China
- Lotus Flag
- Use: Civil and state flag, civil and state ensign
- Proportion: 2:3
- Adopted: Approved on 31 March 1993 by National People's Congress, first used on 20 December 1999; 26 years ago
- Design: Emerald green field with a lotus flower above the stylised Governor Nobre de Carvalho Bridge and water in white, beneath an arc of five golden five-pointed stars, where the large star is in the center flanked by four smaller stars, two on each side of the large star.
- Designed by: Zhang Lei and Xiao Hong

Regional flag of the Macao Special Administrative Region

Chinese name
- Traditional Chinese: 澳門特別行政區區旗
- Simplified Chinese: 澳门特别行政区区旗
Transcriptions
Standard Mandarin
- Hanyu Pinyin: Àomén Tèbié Xíngzhèngqū Qūqí
Yue: Cantonese
- Yale Romanization: Oumún Dahkbiht Hàhngjing Kēui Kēuikèih
- Jyutping: Ou3mun2 Dak6bit6 Hang4zing3 Keoi1 Keoi1kei4

Portuguese name
- Portuguese: Bandeira regional da Região Administrativa Especial de Macau

The Regional Flag of the Macao Special Administrative Region of the People's Republic of China (Note: Chinese: 中華人民共和國澳門特別行政區區旗; Portuguese: Bandeira regional da Região Administrativa Especial de Macau) is emerald green with a lotus flower above the stylized Governador Nobre de Carvalho Bridge and water in white, beneath a circular arc of five golden five-pointed stars: one large star in the center of the arc with two smaller stars on each side of the large star, each with a point angled directly outward from the center of the common circle on which they lie.

The lotus was chosen as the floral emblem of Macau. The Governor Nobre de Carvalho Bridge is a bridge linking the Macau Peninsula and the island of Taipa. The bridge is one of the most recognisable landmarks for the territory. The water beneath the lotus and the bridge symbolise Macau's position as a port and its role played in the territory. The five five-pointed stars echo the design of the flag of China, symbolizing the relationship Macau has with its sovereign state.

Macao began to use the flag design before its handover to China on December 20th, 1999. The flag was designed by professor of arts and crafts at Henan University, Xiao Hong.

According to the Basic Law of Macau, the Macau Regional Flag is a green flag with five stars, a lotus flower, a bridge and sea water. This law also adopted "Apart from displaying the Flag of the People's Republic of China, the Macao Special Administrative Region may also use a regional flag".

== 1993 proposals ==
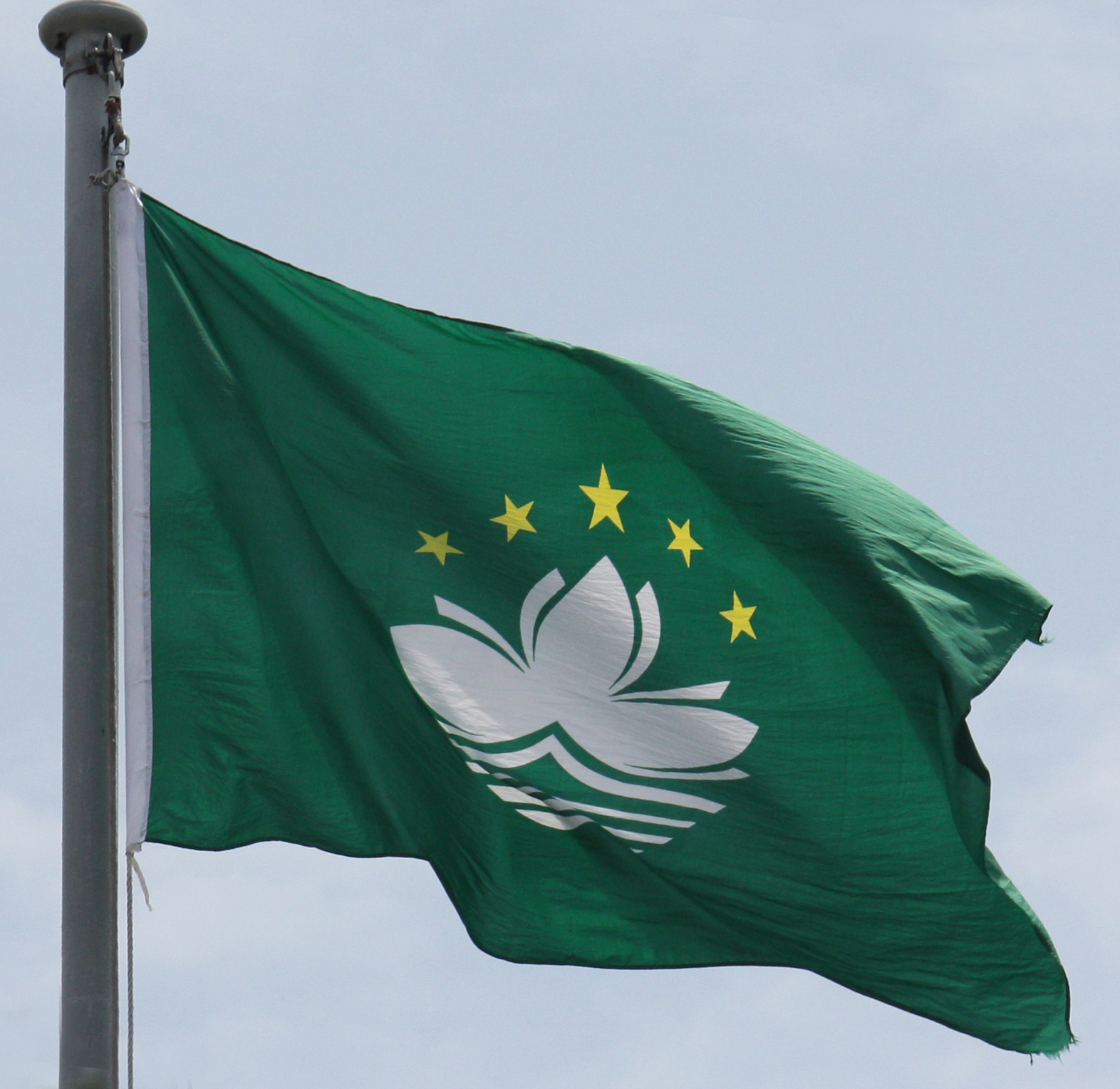
The chosen flag of Macau.

In 1993, several proposed designs were put forward.

- Similar to the current flag of Macau, but the lotus is stylized differently and is found in a disc, with the stars inside the flower;
- A tricolour of red-white-red; the middle band has a depiction of St. Paul's Cathedral in Macau;
- A triband with a stylised "M" standing for Macau; a large star above four smaller stars representative of China;
- A vertical bicolour of green and red, resembling the Flag of Portugal, with a stylised lotus flower in the lower fly;
- A symbol with a red, a blue, and a green circle arranged in a pyramid with a yellow star inside the red circle over a horizontal bicolour of white and yellow;
- A red and blue stylised "M" with a large five-pointed star, with a red lotus blossom within the centre of the star, on the upper fly of a white flag with two blue horizontal bands;
- Similar to the current flag of Macau, but the flag colour is red, and the emblem excludes the bridge and water underneath the lotus on the current flag;
- A stylised lotus flower with an arch of yellow stars on a red flag;
- A stylised lotus flower with an arch of yellow stars above the flower on a red flag;
- A depiction of the Guia Fortress Lighthouse, the oldest in Asia, under a golden star; a white halo ring forms around the lighthouse, and two light cones divide the upper fly (red in colour) and lower fly (blue in colour);
- A vertical bicolour of green and red, resembling the Flag of Portugal, with a white gull in the upper fly and a white depiction of the Gov. Nobre de Carvalho Bridge in the lower fly;
- A stylised lotus flower on a red flag with an arch of yellow stars above the flower;
- A red triangle with base on hoist and apex on the fly edge, filled with the stars from the flag of China;
- A stylised lotus flower, with a red-outlined star within the top petal;
- Another depiction of the Gov. Nobre de Carvalho Bridge in the lower fly on a red flag, with the five yellow stars running parallel to the outline of the bridge;

== Design ==
=== Colors ===
Colors scheme	Emerald Green	White	Yellow
CMYK	95-0-17-54	0-0-0-0	0-13-88-0
HEX	#067662	#FFFFFF	#FFDF1E
RGB	6-118-98	255-255-255	255-223-30

== Portuguese rule ==
Prior to the handover to China in 1999, Macau officially used only the Portuguese flag, in contrast to British Hong Kong which used a defaced Blue Ensign as its flag, alongside the Union Jack. In 1967, there were proposals to give each overseas province its own flag, consisting of the Portuguese flag with the local coat of arms, but none was ever adopted.

The Government of Macau adopted a flag with the colony's coat of arms on a light blue field. Meanwhile, the Municipal Council of Macau had a flag with a Portuguese-style coat of arms and two angels as heraldic supporters, which was used at the 1999 handover ceremony as well as the 1990, 1994 and 1998 Asian Games.

== Historical flags ==
Flag	Duration	Use	Description
	1557–1578	Flag of Portugal (1521–1578) used in colonial-era Portuguese Macau.	The Portuguese flag was used in colonial-era Macau, as there was no territorial flag.
	1578–1640	Flag of Portugal (1495–1578) used in colonial-era Portuguese Macau.	The Portuguese flag was used in colonial-era Macau, as there was no territorial flag.
	1640–1667	Flag of Portugal (1640–1667) used in colonial-era Portuguese Macau.	The Portuguese flag was used in colonial-era Macau, as there was no territorial flag.
	1667–1707	Flag of Portugal (1667–1707) used in colonial-era Portuguese Macau.	The Portuguese flag was used in colonial-era Macau, as there was no territorial flag.
	1707–1816	Flag of Portugal (1707–1750) used in colonial-era Portuguese Macau.	The Portuguese flag was used in colonial-era Macau, as there was no territorial flag.
	1816–1830	Flag of Portugal (1816–1830) used in colonial-era Portuguese Macau.	The Portuguese flag was used in colonial-era Macau, as there was no territorial flag.
	1830–1910	Flag of Portugal (1830–1910) used in colonial-era Portuguese Macau.	The Portuguese flag was used in colonial-era Macau, as there was no territorial flag.
	1911–1999	Flag of Portugal (1911–1999) used in colonial-era Portuguese Macau.	The Portuguese flag was used in colonial-era Macau, as there was no territorial flag.
	1975–1999	Flag of the Municipality of Macau, one of two local municipal governments.	A light blue field charged with the coat of arms of the Municipality of Macau. This was the flag used at sport events and at the 1999 handover ceremony.
	1975–1999	Flag of the Municipality of Macau, one of two local municipal governments.	White Variant.
	1975–1999	Flag of the Municipality of Ilhas, one of two local municipal governments.	An orange field charged with the coat of arms of the Municipality of Ilhas.
	1975–1999	Flag of Portuguese colonial Government of Macau.	A light blue field charged with the official coat of arms of the Portuguese colony of Macau. During the Portuguese administration this flag also represented the territory of Macau in the international forums, although it was not the official flag of the Portuguese colony.
	1975–1999	Semi Official Variant flag of Portuguese Macau.	Semi Official variant without a mural crown representing the Kingdom of the Algarve castles in the coat of arms and replacing "Government of Macau" with simply "Macau". This flag was found at the University of Macau in a photo of International University Sports Federation event and it was used in man. Although never used officially, this flag was used in another sporting events to represent the colony.

== Gallery ==
Flag of the Portuguese Governor of Macau

Proposed flag for Portuguese Macau (1932)

Proposed flag for Portuguese Macau (1965)

Construction sheet

== See also ==
- Emblem of Macau
- List of Chinese flags
- Flag of Hong Kong
- Flag of the People's Republic of China
- National anthem of the People's Republic of China
